= 2013 British GT Championship =

Sports car racing season

Seasons
- ← 2012 2014 →

The 2013 Avon Tyres British GT season was the 21st season of the British GT Championship. The season began on 30 March at Oulton Park and finished on 6 October at Donington Park, after ten rounds held over seven meetings. Beechdean Motorsport team principal Andrew Howard won the GT3 category in an Aston Martin V12 Vantage GT3, Optimum Motorsport's Ryan Ratcliffe and Rick Parfitt Jr. won the GT4 championship, driving a Ginetta G50 while Paul Bailey and Andy Schulz took the GTC title in a Ferrari 458 Challenge, driving for Horsepower Racing.

== Entry list ==
The SRO released the entry list on 7 March at the season launch, containing 27 GT3 and 6 GT4 full season entries.

2013 Entry List
Team	No.	Drivers	Class	Chassis	Engine	Rounds
(United Kingdom) Beechdean Motorsport	007	(United Kingdom) Jonathan Adam	GT3	Aston Martin V12 Vantage GT3	Aston Martin 6.0L V12	All
(United Kingdom) Beechdean Motorsport	007	(United Kingdom) Andrew Howard	GT3	Aston Martin V12 Vantage GT3	Aston Martin 6.0L V12	All
Omantel Oman Air Motorbase	1	(United Kingdom) Michael Caine	GT3	Porsche 997 GT3-R	Porsche 4.0L Flat-6	All
Omantel Oman Air Motorbase	1	(Oman) Ahmad Al Harthy	GT3	Porsche 997 GT3-R	Porsche 4.0L Flat-6	All
(United Kingdom) Predator CCTV-AMR	2	(United Kingdom) Adam Wilcox	GT3	Aston Martin V12 Vantage GT3	Aston Martin 6.0L V12	10
(United Kingdom) Predator CCTV-AMR	2	(United Kingdom) Phil Burton	GT3	Aston Martin V12 Vantage GT3	Aston Martin 6.0L V12	10
(United Kingdom) Rosso Verde	3	(United Kingdom) Hector Lester	GT3	Ferrari 458 Italia GT3	Ferrari 4.5L V8	1–2, 4
(United Kingdom) Rosso Verde	3	(Denmark) Allan Simonsen	GT3	Ferrari 458 Italia GT3	Ferrari 4.5L V8	1–2, 4
(United Kingdom) MTECH	4	(United Kingdom) Adam Wilcox	GT3	Ferrari 458 Italia GT3	Ferrari 4.5L V8	4
(United Kingdom) MTECH	4	(United Kingdom) Phil Burton	GT3	Ferrari 458 Italia GT3	Ferrari 4.5L V8	4
(United Kingdom) MTECH	21	(Republic of Ireland) Matt Griffin	GT3	Ferrari 458 Italia GT3	Ferrari 4.5L V8	1–2
(United Kingdom) MTECH	21	(United Kingdom) Duncan Cameron	GT3	Ferrari 458 Italia GT3	Ferrari 4.5L V8	1–2
(United Kingdom) MTECH	41	(United Kingdom) Julien Draper	GT3	Ferrari 458 Italia GT3	Ferrari 4.5L V8	1–2
(United Kingdom) MTECH	41	(United Kingdom) Derek Johnston	GT3	Ferrari 458 Italia GT3	Ferrari 4.5L V8	1–7
(United Kingdom) MTECH	41	(United Kingdom) Jake Rattenbury	GT3	Ferrari 458 Italia GT3	Ferrari 4.5L V8	3–7
(United Kingdom) MTECH	42	(United Kingdom) Derek Johnston	GT3	Ginetta G55 GT3	Ginetta 4.3L V8	8–10
(United Kingdom) MTECH	42	(United Kingdom) Luke Hines	GT3	Ginetta G55 GT3	Ginetta 4.3L V8	8–10
(Belgium) Team WRT	5	(United Kingdom) Warren Hughes	GT3	Audi R8 LMS Ultra	Audi 5.2L V10	7–9
(Belgium) Team WRT	5	(Netherlands) Rembert Berg	GT3	Audi R8 LMS Ultra	Audi 5.2L V10	7–9
(United Kingdom) PGF-Kinfaun AMR	6	(United Kingdom) John Gaw	GT3	Aston Martin V12 Vantage GT3	Aston Martin 6.0L V12	All
(United Kingdom) PGF-Kinfaun AMR	6	(United Kingdom) Phil Dryburgh	GT3	Aston Martin V12 Vantage GT3	Aston Martin 6.0L V12	All
(United Kingdom) 888Optimum	8	(United Kingdom) Joe Osborne	GT3	BMW Z4 GT3	BMW 4.4L V8	All
(United Kingdom) 888Optimum	8	(United Kingdom) Lee Mowle	GT3	BMW Z4 GT3	BMW 4.4L V8	All
(United Kingdom) 888Optimum	888	(United Kingdom) Daniel Brown	GT3	BMW Z4 GT3	BMW 4.4L V8	All
(United Kingdom) 888Optimum	888	(United Kingdom) Steve Tandy	GT3	BMW Z4 GT3	BMW 4.4L V8	All
(Australia) Von Ryan Racing	9	(France) Grégoire Demoustier	GT3	McLaren MP4-12C GT3	McLaren 3.8L Turbo V8	3–7, 10
(Australia) Von Ryan Racing	9	(United Kingdom) Duncan Tappy	GT3	McLaren MP4-12C GT3	McLaren 3.8L Turbo V8	3–7, 10
(United Kingdom) M-Sport Racing	10	(United Kingdom) Warren Hughes	Inv; GT3	Audi R8 LMS Ultra	Audi 5.2L V10	1–6
(United Kingdom) M-Sport Racing	10	(Netherlands) Rembert Berg	Inv; GT3	Audi R8 LMS Ultra	Audi 5.2L V10	1–6
(United Kingdom) PE Group Blendini Motorsport	11	(United Kingdom) Dominic Evans	GT3	Audi R8 LMS	Audi 5.2L V10	1–4, 7, 10
(United Kingdom) PE Group Blendini Motorsport	11	(United Kingdom) Tom Roche	GT3	Audi R8 LMS	Audi 5.2L V10	1–4, 7, 10
(United Kingdom) Balfe Motorsport	12	(United Kingdom) Shaun Balfe	GT3	Ferrari 458 Italia GT3	Ferrari 4.5L V8	3
(United Kingdom) Balfe Motorsport	12	(Brazil) Tommy Erdos	GT3	Ferrari 458 Italia GT3	Ferrari 4.5L V8	3
(Italy) AF Corse	13	(United Kingdom) Aaron Scott	GT3	Ferrari 458 Italia GT3	Ferrari 4.5L V8	All
(Italy) AF Corse	13	(United Kingdom) John Dhillon	GT3	Ferrari 458 Italia GT3	Ferrari 4.5L V8	All
(Italy) AF Corse	28	(Australia) Steve Wyatt	GT3	Ferrari 458 Italia GT3	Ferrari 4.5L V8	4
(Italy) AF Corse	28	(Italy) Michele Rugolo	GT3	Ferrari 458 Italia GT3	Ferrari 4.5L V8	4
(Italy) AF Corse	29	(Republic of Ireland) Matt Griffin	GT3	Ferrari 458 Italia GT3	Ferrari 4.5L V8	4, 7
(Italy) AF Corse	29	(United Kingdom) Duncan Cameron	GT3	Ferrari 458 Italia GT3	Ferrari 4.5L V8	4, 7
(United Kingdom) Fortec Motorsports	14	(United Kingdom) Jason Minshaw	GT3	Mercedes-Benz SLS AMG GT3	Mercedes-AMG 6.2L V8	All
(United Kingdom) Fortec Motorsports	14	(United Kingdom) James Walker	GT3	Mercedes-Benz SLS AMG GT3	Mercedes-AMG 6.2L V8	1–2
(United Kingdom) Fortec Motorsports	14	(United Kingdom) Benji Hetherington	GT3	Mercedes-Benz SLS AMG GT3	Mercedes-AMG 6.2L V8	3–10
(United Kingdom) Fortec Motorsports	15	(United Kingdom) Ollie Hancock	GT3	Mercedes-Benz SLS AMG GT3	Mercedes-AMG 6.2L V8	1–2
(United Kingdom) Fortec Motorsports	15	(United Kingdom) Benji Hetherington	GT3	Mercedes-Benz SLS AMG GT3	Mercedes-AMG 6.2L V8	1–2
(United Kingdom) Fortec Motorsports	15	(Paraguay) Danny Candia	GT3	Mercedes-Benz SLS AMG GT3	Mercedes-AMG 6.2L V8	3
(United Kingdom) Fortec Motorsports	15	(United Kingdom) Oliver Webb	GT3	Mercedes-Benz SLS AMG GT3	Mercedes-AMG 6.2L V8	3
(United Kingdom) Fortec Motorsports	15	(Luxembourg) Steve Jans	GT3	Mercedes-Benz SLS AMG GT3	Mercedes-AMG 6.2L V8	4
(United Kingdom) Fortec Motorsports	15	(Netherlands) Klaas Hummel	GT3	Mercedes-Benz SLS AMG GT3	Mercedes-AMG 6.2L V8	4
(United Kingdom) Team LNT	16	(United Kingdom) Mike Simpson	GT3	Ginetta G55 GT3	Ginetta 4.3L V8	All
(United Kingdom) Team LNT	16	(United Kingdom) Richard Sykes	GT3	Ginetta G55 GT3	Ginetta 4.3L V8	1–6
(United Kingdom) Team LNT	16	(United Kingdom) Rob Smith	GT3	Ginetta G55 GT3	Ginetta 4.3L V8	7–10
(United Kingdom) Stark Racing	17	(United Kingdom) Ian Stinton	GT3	Ginetta G55 GT3	Ginetta 4.3L V8	4
(United Kingdom) Stark Racing	17	(United Kingdom) Nathan Freke	GT3	Ginetta G55 GT3	Ginetta 4.3L V8	4
(United Kingdom) FF Corse	18	(United Kingdom) Rob Barff	GT3	Ferrari 458 Italia GT3	Ferrari 4.5L V8	All
(United Kingdom) FF Corse	18	(United Kingdom) Gary Eastwood	GT3	Ferrari 458 Italia GT3	Ferrari 4.5L V8	All
(United Kingdom) FF Corse	19	(Belgium) Jacques Duyver	GTC	Ferrari 458 Challenge	Ferrari 4.5L V8	4, 7
(United Kingdom) FF Corse	19	(United Kingdom) Charlie Hollings	GTC	Ferrari 458 Challenge	Ferrari 4.5L V8	4, 7
(United Kingdom) FF Corse	20	(United Kingdom) Paul McNeilly	GT3B	Ferrari F430 GT3	Ferrari 4.3L V8	4
(United Kingdom) FF Corse	20	(United Kingdom) Jamie Stanley	GT3B	Ferrari F430 GT3	Ferrari 4.3L V8	4
(United Kingdom) FF Corse	26	(Belgium) Jacques Duyver	GT3	Ferrari 458 Italia GT3	Ferrari 4.5L V8	10
(United Kingdom) FF Corse	26	(United Kingdom) Charlie Hollings	GT3	Ferrari 458 Italia GT3	Ferrari 4.5L V8	10
(United Kingdom) Preci-Spark Engineering	22	(United Kingdom) David Jones	GT3	McLaren MP4-12C GT3	McLaren 3.8L Turbo V8	1–7
(United Kingdom) Preci-Spark Engineering	22	(United Kingdom) Godfrey Jones	GT3	McLaren MP4-12C GT3	McLaren 3.8L Turbo V8	1–7
(United Kingdom) Preci-Spark Engineering	22	(United Kingdom) David Jones	GT3	Mercedes-Benz SLS AMG GT3	Mercedes-AMG 6.2L V8	10
(United Kingdom) Preci-Spark Engineering	22	(United Kingdom) Godfrey Jones	GT3	Mercedes-Benz SLS AMG GT3	Mercedes-AMG 6.2L V8	10
(United States) United Autosports	23	(United States) Zak Brown	GT3	McLaren MP4-12C GT3	McLaren 3.8L Turbo V8	1–7
(United States) United Autosports	23	(United Kingdom) Glynn Geddie	GT3	McLaren MP4-12C GT3	McLaren 3.8L Turbo V8	1–2
(United States) United Autosports	23	(Portugal) Álvaro Parente	GT3	McLaren MP4-12C GT3	McLaren 3.8L Turbo V8	3–7
(United States) United Autosports	24	(United Kingdom) Mark Blundell	GT3	McLaren MP4-12C GT3	McLaren 3.8L Turbo V8	1–4
(United States) United Autosports	24	(United Kingdom) Roger Wills	GT3	McLaren MP4-12C GT3	McLaren 3.8L Turbo V8	1–2
(United States) United Autosports	24	(United Kingdom) Jody Firth	GT3	McLaren MP4-12C GT3	McLaren 3.8L Turbo V8	3–7
(United States) United Autosports	24	(United Kingdom) Glynn Geddie	GT3	McLaren MP4-12C GT3	McLaren 3.8L Turbo V8	5–7
(United States) United Autosports	25	(United Kingdom) Matt Bell	GT3	Audi R8 LMS Ultra	Audi 5.2L V10	All
(United States) United Autosports	25	(United States) Mark Patterson	GT3	Audi R8 LMS Ultra	Audi 5.2L V10	All
(Germany) Vita4One Team Italy	27	(Italy) Matteo Bobbi	GT3	Ferrari 458 Italia GT3	Ferrari 4.5L V8	1–4
(Germany) Vita4One Team Italy	27	(United Kingdom) Jay Palmer	GT3	Ferrari 458 Italia GT3	Ferrari 4.5L V8	1–4
(United Kingdom) Trackspeed	31	(United Kingdom) Nick Tandy	GT3	Porsche 997 GT3-R	Porsche 4.0L Flat-6	All
(United Kingdom) Trackspeed	31	(United Kingdom) David Ashburn	GT3	Porsche 997 GT3-R	Porsche 4.0L Flat-6	All
(United Kingdom) Trackspeed	32	(United Kingdom) Richard Westbrook	GT3	Porsche 997 GT3-R	Porsche 4.0L Flat-6	1–4, 10
(United Kingdom) Trackspeed	32	(United Kingdom) Gregor Fisken	GT3	Porsche 997 GT3-R	Porsche 4.0L Flat-6	All
(United Kingdom) Trackspeed	32	(United Kingdom) Stephen Jelley	GT3	Porsche 997 GT3-R	Porsche 4.0L Flat-6	5–9
(United Kingdom) Trackspeed	33	(United Kingdom) Phil Keen	GT3	Porsche 997 GT3-R	Porsche 4.0L Flat-6	All
(United Kingdom) Trackspeed	33	(United Kingdom) Jon Minshaw	GT3	Porsche 997 GT3-R	Porsche 4.0L Flat-6	All
(United Kingdom) IDL Racing with CWS	40	(United Kingdom) Tom Sharp	GT3	Ginetta G55 GT3	Ginetta 4.3L V8	All
(United Kingdom) IDL Racing with CWS	40	(United Kingdom) Colin White	GT3	Ginetta G55 GT3	Ginetta 4.3L V8	All
(United Kingdom) Century Motorsport	43	(United Kingdom) Declan Jones	GT4	Ginetta G50 GT4	Ford Cyclone 3.5L V6	All
(United Kingdom) Century Motorsport	43	(United Kingdom) Zoë Wenham	GT4	Ginetta G50 GT4	Ford Cyclone 3.5L V6	1–7
(United Kingdom) Century Motorsport	43	(United Kingdom) Nathan Freke	GT4	Ginetta G50 GT4	Ford Cyclone 3.5L V6	8–10
(United Kingdom) Optimum Motorsport	44	(United Kingdom) Ryan Ratcliffe	GT4	Ginetta G50 GT4	Ford Cyclone 3.5L V6	All
(United Kingdom) Optimum Motorsport	44	(United Kingdom) Rick Parfitt Jr.	GT4	Ginetta G50 GT4	Ford Cyclone 3.5L V6	All
(United Kingdom) Blendini/Triple-R	45	(United Kingdom) Rory Bryant	GT4	Ginetta G50 GT4	Ford Cyclone 3.5L V6	4, 7–10
(United Kingdom) Blendini/Triple-R	45	(United Kingdom) Anthony Rodgers	GT4	Ginetta G50 GT4	Ford Cyclone 3.5L V6	4, 7
(United Kingdom) Blendini/Triple-R	45	(United Kingdom) David Barker	GT4	Ginetta G50 GT4	Ford Cyclone 3.5L V6	8–9
(United Kingdom) Blendini/Triple-R	45	(United Kingdom) Zoë Wenham	GT4	Ginetta G50 GT4	Ford Cyclone 3.5L V6	10
(United Kingdom) Twisted Team Parker	46	(United Kingdom) Bradley Ellis	GT4	Ginetta G50 GT4	Ford Cyclone 3.5L V6	10
(United Kingdom) Twisted Team Parker	46	(United Kingdom) Adrian Barwick	GT4	Ginetta G50 GT4	Ford Cyclone 3.5L V6	10
(Belgium) Prospeed Competition	48	(United States) Charles Putman	GT3	Porsche 997 GT3-R	Porsche 4.0L Flat-6	4
(Belgium) Prospeed Competition	48	(United States) Charles Espenlaub	GT3	Porsche 997 GT3-R	Porsche 4.0L Flat-6	4
(United Kingdom) Redgate/Lifetime Racing	50	(Czech Republic) Matt Smith	GT4	Ginetta G50 GT4	Ford Cyclone 3.5L V6	All
(United Kingdom) Redgate/Lifetime Racing	50	(United Kingdom) Dan Eagling	GT4	Ginetta G50 GT4	Ford Cyclone 3.5L V6	All
(United Kingdom) Complete Racing AMR	53	(United Kingdom) Tom Wilson	GT4	Aston Martin V8 Vantage GT4	Aston Martin 4.7L V8	1–7, 10
(United Kingdom) Complete Racing AMR	53	(United Kingdom) Steve Chaplin	GT4	Aston Martin V8 Vantage GT4	Aston Martin 4.7L V8	1–7, 10
(United Kingdom) Aston Martin Racing	54	(New Zealand) Richie Stanaway	GT4	Aston Martin V8 Vantage GT4	Aston Martin 4.7L V8	10
(United Kingdom) Aston Martin Racing	54	(United Kingdom) Harry Whale	GT4	Aston Martin V8 Vantage GT4	Aston Martin 4.7L V8	10
(United Kingdom) Horsepower Racing	61	(United Kingdom) Paul Bailey	GTC	Ferrari 458 Challenge	Ferrari 4.5L V8	8–10
(United Kingdom) Horsepower Racing	61	(United Kingdom) Andy Schulz	GTC	Ferrari 458 Challenge	Ferrari 4.5L V8	8–10
(United Kingdom) APO Sport	69	(United Kingdom) Alex Osborne	GT4	Ginetta G50 GT4	Ford Cyclone 3.5L V6	All
(United Kingdom) APO Sport	69	(United Kingdom) James May	GT4	Ginetta G50 GT4	Ford Cyclone 3.5L V6	All
(United Kingdom) Ecurie Ecosse with Barwell Motorsport	78	(United Kingdom) Piers Johnson	GT3	BMW Z4 GT3	BMW 4.4L V8	All
(United Kingdom) Ecurie Ecosse with Barwell Motorsport	78	(United Kingdom) Ron Johnson	GT3	BMW Z4 GT3	BMW 4.4L V8	All
(United Kingdom) Ecurie Ecosse (United Kingdom) Ecurie Ecosse powered by Black Bull	79	(United Kingdom) Oliver Bryant	GT3	BMW Z4 GT3	BMW 4.4L V8	All
(United Kingdom) Ecurie Ecosse (United Kingdom) Ecurie Ecosse powered by Black Bull	79	(United Kingdom) Marco Attard	GT3	BMW Z4 GT3	BMW 4.4L V8	All
(United Kingdom) Barwell Motorsport	80	(United Kingdom) Mark Poole	GT3	Aston Martin V12 Vantage GT3	Aston Martin 6.0L V12	1–7, 10
(United Kingdom) Barwell Motorsport	80	(United Kingdom) Richard Abra	GT3	Aston Martin V12 Vantage GT3	Aston Martin 6.0L V12	1–7, 10
(United Kingdom) JRM Racing	230	(United Kingdom) Jody Fannin	GT3	Nissan GT-R Nismo GT3	Nissan VR38DETT 3.8L Turbo V6	1–2
(United Kingdom) JRM Racing	320	(United Kingdom) Mark Cole	GT3	Nissan GT-R Nismo GT3	Nissan VR38DETT 3.8L Turbo V6	1–2
(Netherlands) Ekris Motorsport	401	(Netherlands) Ricardo van der Ende	GT4	BMW M3 GT4	BMW 4.0L V8	4
(Netherlands) Ekris Motorsport	401	(Netherlands) Bernhard van Oranje	GT4	BMW M3 GT4	BMW 4.0L V8	4
(Netherlands) Ekris Motorsport	408	(Netherlands) Ricardo van der Ende	GT4	BMW M3 GT4	BMW 4.0L V8	8–9 (Note: Competing in the Dutch GT Championship. Ineligible for British GT4 points.)
(Netherlands) Ekris Motorsport	408	(Netherlands) Pieter-Christiaan van Oranje	GT4	BMW M3 GT4	BMW 4.0L V8	8–9
(Netherlands) Ekris Motorsport	411	(Netherlands) Jan Joris Verheul	GT4	BMW M3 GT4	BMW 4.0L V8	4
(Netherlands) Ekris Motorsport	411	(Netherlands) Pieter-Christiaan van Oranje	GT4	BMW M3 GT4	BMW 4.0L V8	4
(Portugal) Veloso Motorsport	402	(Portugal) Mauro Dias Marques	GT4	Aston Martin V8 Vantage GT4	Aston Martin 4.7L V8	4
(Portugal) Veloso Motorsport	402	(Portugal) Fábio Mota	GT4	Aston Martin V8 Vantage GT4	Aston Martin 4.7L V8	4
(United Kingdom) Motorground	403	(United Kingdom) Henry Taylor	GT4	Ginetta G50 GT4	Ford Cyclone 3.5L V6	4
(United Kingdom) Motorground	403	(United Kingdom) Nigel Farmer	GT4	Ginetta G50 GT4	Ford Cyclone 3.5L V6	4
(Netherlands) V8Racing8V (Netherlands) Las Moras Racing Team	405	(Netherlands) Rick Abresch	GT4	Chevrolet Camaro SS GT4	Chevrolet 6.2L V8	4
(Netherlands) V8Racing8V (Netherlands) Las Moras Racing Team	405	(Netherlands) Nicky Pastorelli	GT4	Chevrolet Camaro SS GT4	Chevrolet 6.2L V8	4
(Netherlands) V8Racing8V (Netherlands) Las Moras Racing Team	406	(Netherlands) Luc Braams	GT4	Chevrolet Camaro SS GT4	Chevrolet 6.2L V8	4
(Netherlands) V8Racing8V (Netherlands) Las Moras Racing Team	406	(Netherlands) Duncan Huisman	GT4	Chevrolet Camaro SS GT4	Chevrolet 6.2L V8	4
(Netherlands) V8Racing8V (Netherlands) Las Moras Racing Team	409	(Netherlands) Luc Braams	GT4	Chevrolet Camaro SS GT4	Chevrolet 6.2L V8	8–9
(Netherlands) V8Racing8V (Netherlands) Las Moras Racing Team	409	(Netherlands) Duncan Huisman	GT4	Chevrolet Camaro SS GT4	Chevrolet 6.2L V8	8–9
(Netherlands) V8Racing8V (Netherlands) Las Moras Racing Team	412	(Netherlands) Bertus Sanders	GT4	Chevrolet Camaro SS GT4	Chevrolet 6.2L V8	8–9
(Netherlands) V8Racing8V (Netherlands) Las Moras Racing Team	412	(Netherlands) Frank Wilschut	GT4	Chevrolet Camaro SS GT4	Chevrolet 6.2L V8	8–9
(Netherlands) HDI Gerling-Formido Racing	406	(Netherlands) Kelvin Snoeks	GT4	Corvette C6 GT4	Chevrolet 6.2L V8	8–9
(Netherlands) HDI Gerling-Formido Racing	406	(Netherlands) Marcel Nooren	GT4	Corvette C6 GT4	Chevrolet 6.2L V8	8–9
(Germany) PROsport Performance	408	(Germany) Jörg Viebahn	GT4	Porsche 997 GT4	Porsche 3.6L Flat-6	4
(Germany) PROsport Performance	408	(United Kingdom) Adam Christodoulou	GT4	Porsche 997 GT4	Porsche 3.6L Flat-6	4
(Netherlands) Cor Euser Racing	409	(Netherlands) Cor Euser	GT4	Lotus Evora GT4	Toyota 4.0L V6	4
(Netherlands) Cor Euser Racing	409	(Netherlands) Rob Severs	GT4	Lotus Evora GT4	Toyota 4.0L V6	4
(Netherlands) Nissan GT Academy by Equipe Verschuur	423	(Netherlands) Sandor van Es	GT4	Nissan 370Z GT4	Nissan 3.8L V6	8–9
(Netherlands) Nissan GT Academy by Equipe Verschuur	423	(Netherlands) Dennis van de Laar	GT4	Nissan 370Z GT4	Nissan 3.8L V6	8–9

Icon	Class
GT3	GT3 Class
GT3B	GT3B Class
GT4	GT4 Class
GTC	Cup Class
Inv	Invitation Class

== Race calendar and results ==
The 2013 calendar was announced on 13 September 2012. A revised calendar was released on 6 December 2012, with Zandvoort replacing the Nürburgring. All races except Dutch round at Zandvoort, were held in the United Kingdom.

Round	Circuit	Date	Length	Pole position	GT3 winner	GT4 winner
1	Oulton Park	1 April	60 mins	No. 15 Fortec Motorsports	No. 33 Trackspeed	No. 43 Century Motorsport
1	Oulton Park	1 April	60 mins	(United Kingdom) Ollie Hancock (United Kingdom) Benji Hetherington	(United Kingdom) Phil Keen (United Kingdom) Jon Minshaw	(United Kingdom) Declan Jones (United Kingdom) Zoë Wenham
2	Oulton Park	1 April	60 mins	No. 3 Rosso Verde	No. 31 Trackspeed	No. 43 Century Motorsport
2	Oulton Park	1 April	60 mins	(United Kingdom) Hector Lester (Denmark) Allan Simonsen	(United Kingdom) Nick Tandy (United Kingdom) David Ashburn	(United Kingdom) Declan Jones (United Kingdom) Zoë Wenham
3	Rockingham	6 May	120 mins	No. 31 Trackspeed	No. 32 Trackspeed	No. 53 Complete Racing AMR
3	Rockingham	6 May	120 mins	(United Kingdom) Nick Tandy (United Kingdom) David Ashburn	(United Kingdom) Richard Westbrook (United Kingdom) Gregor Fisken	(United Kingdom) Tom Wilson (United Kingdom) Steve Chaplin
4	Silverstone Arena	26 May	180 mins	No. 79 Ecurie Ecosse	No. 79 Ecurie Ecosse	No. 408 PROsport Performance
4	Silverstone Arena	26 May	180 mins	(United Kingdom) Oliver Bryant (United Kingdom) Marco Attard	(United Kingdom) Oliver Bryant (United Kingdom) Marco Attard	(Germany) Jörg Viebahn (United Kingdom) Adam Christodoulou
5	Snetterton	16 June	60 mins	No. 10 M-Sport Racing	No. 1 Oman Air Motorbase	No. 44 Optimum Motorsport
5	Snetterton	16 June	60 mins	(United Kingdom) Warren Hughes (Netherlands) Rembert Berg	(United Kingdom) Michael Caine (Oman) Ahmad Al Harthy	(United Kingdom) Ryan Ratcliffe (United Kingdom) Rick Parfitt Jr.
6	Snetterton	16 June	60 mins	No. 32 Trackspeed	No. 31 Trackspeed	No. 44 Optimum Motorsport
6	Snetterton	16 June	60 mins	(United Kingdom) Stephen Jelley (United Kingdom) Gregor Fisken	(United Kingdom) Nick Tandy (United Kingdom) David Ashburn	(United Kingdom) Ryan Ratcliffe (United Kingdom) Rick Parfitt Jr.
7	Brands Hatch GP	11 August	120 mins	No. 888 888Optimum	No. 007 Beechdean Motorsport	No. 44 Optimum Motorsport
7	Brands Hatch GP	11 August	120 mins	(United Kingdom) Daniel Brown (United Kingdom) Steve Tandy	(United Kingdom) Jonathan Adam (United Kingdom) Andrew Howard	(United Kingdom) Ryan Ratcliffe (United Kingdom) Rick Parfitt Jr.
8	Zandvoort	7 September	60 mins	No. 1 Oman Air Motorbase	No. 1 Oman Air Motorbase	No. 50 Redgate/Lifetime Racing
8	Zandvoort	7 September	60 mins	(United Kingdom) Michael Caine (Oman) Ahmad Al Harthy	(United Kingdom) Michael Caine (Oman) Ahmad Al Harthy	(Czech Republic) Matt Smith (United Kingdom) Dan Eagling
9	Zandvoort	8 September	60 mins	No. 31 Trackspeed	No. 31 Trackspeed	No. 45 Blendini/Triple-R
9	Zandvoort	8 September	60 mins	(United Kingdom) Nick Tandy (United Kingdom) David Ashburn	(United Kingdom) Nick Tandy (United Kingdom) David Ashburn	(United Kingdom) Rory Bryant (United Kingdom) David Barker
10	Donington Park	6 October	120 mins	No. 8 888Optimum	No. 25 United Autosports	No. 43 Century Motorsport
10	Donington Park	6 October	120 mins	(United Kingdom) Joe Osborne (United Kingdom) Lee Mowle	(United Kingdom) Matt Bell (United States) Mark Patterson	(United Kingdom) Declan Jones (United Kingdom) Nathan Freke

== Championship standings ==
- Points are awarded as follows:

Length	1	2	3	4	5	6	7	8	9	10
60 mins	25	18	15	12	10	8	6	4	2	1
60+ mins	37.5	27	22.5	18	15	12	9	6	3	1.5
Half points are awarded if a class had less than 3 cars

=== GT3/GTC ===
Pos	Driver	OUL		ROC	SIL	SNE		BRH	ZAN		DON	Pts
GT3 Class
1	(United Kingdom) Andrew Howard	Ret	22†	7	2	4	5	1	11	4	4	125.5
2	(United Kingdom) Matt Bell	9	2	3	17	5	3	6	7	10	1	124
2	(United States) Mark Patterson	9	2	3	17	5	3	6	7	10	1	124
3	(United Kingdom) Oliver Bryant	6	3	DSQ	1	Ret	7	3	5	6	5	122
3	(United Kingdom) Marco Attard	6	3	DSQ	1	Ret	7	3	5	6	5	122
4	(United Kingdom) Jonathan Adam	Ret	22†	7	2	4	5	1	11	4	4	119.5
5	(United Kingdom) Michael Caine	4	9	6	8	1	8	7	1	9	12	97
5	(Oman) Ahmad Al Harthy	4	9	6	8	1	8	7	1	9	12	97
6	(United Kingdom) Nick Tandy	2	1	Ret	Ret	23†	1	DSQ	Ret	1	Ret	93
7	(United Kingdom) Daniel Brown	20†	5	Ret	3	14	2	4	2	Ret	Ret	86.5
7	(United Kingdom) Steve Tandy	20†	5	Ret	3	14	2	4	2	Ret	Ret	86.5
8	(United Kingdom) Rob Barff	11	7	5	12	9	15	Ret	3	2	2	83
8	(United Kingdom) Gary Eastwood	11	7	5	12	9	15	Ret	3	2	2	83
9	(United Kingdom) David Ashburn	2	1	Ret	Ret	23†	1	DSQ	Ret	1	Ret	81
10	(United Kingdom) Benji Hetherington	3	23†	4	13	6	6	5	15	12	13	64
11	(United Kingdom) Richard Westbrook	DSQ	12	1	Ret						3	60
11	(United Kingdom) Gregor Fisken	DSQ	12	1	Ret	Ret	24†	Ret	14	11	3	60
12	(United Kingdom) Jason Minshaw	Ret	6	4	13	6	6	5	15	12	13	57
13	(United Kingdom) Duncan Tappy			9	32	3	11	2			7	54
13	(France) Grégoire Demoustier			9	32	3	11	2			7	54
14	(United Kingdom) Phil Keen	1	DSQ	21†	Ret	7	Ret	13	6	3	9	48
14	(United Kingdom) Jon Minshaw	1	DSQ	21†	Ret	7	Ret	13	6	3	9	48
15	(United Kingdom) Warren Hughes	17	14	2	11	2	10	14	9	Ret		48
15	(Netherlands) Rembert Berg	17	14	2	11	2	10	14	9	Ret		48
16	(United Kingdom) Aaron Scott	7	13	14	7	15	9	8	Ret	5	6	45
16	(United Kingdom) John Dhillon	7	13	14	7	15	9	8	Ret	5	6	45
17	(United Kingdom) Hector Lester	5	4		10	DNS	DNS					23.5
17	(Denmark) Allan Simonsen	5	4		10	DNS	DNS					23.5
18	(United Kingdom) Lee Mowle	14	19†	11	Ret	16	4	10	8	7	26†	23.5
18	(United Kingdom) Joe Osborne	14	19†	11	Ret	16	4	10	8	7	26†	23.5
19	(Republic of Ireland) Matt Griffin	8	Ret		4			21†				22
19	(United Kingdom) Duncan Cameron	8	Ret		4			21†				22
20	(United Kingdom) John Gaw	10	Ret	13	16	12	12	9	4	8	Ret	20
20	(United Kingdom) Phil Dryburgh	10	Ret	13	16	12	12	9	4	8	Ret	20
21	(United Kingdom) Ollie Hancock	3	23†									15
22	(United Kingdom) Richard Abra			22†	5	Ret	Ret	20†			11	15
22	(United Kingdom) Mark Poole			22†	5	Ret	Ret	20†			11	15
23	(Italy) Michele Rugolo				6							12
23	(Australia) Steve Wyatt				6							12
24	(United Kingdom) James Walker	Ret	6									8
25	(United Kingdom) Tom Sharp	15	24†	15	15	11	Ret	12†	Ret	13	8	6
25	(United Kingdom) Colin White	15	24†	15	15	11	Ret	12†	Ret	13	8	6
26	(United Kingdom) Jake Rattenbury			8	Ret	24†	Ret	Ret				6
26	(United Kingdom) Derek Johnston	Ret	26†	8	Ret	24†	Ret	Ret	12	16	Ret	6
27	(United Kingdom) Glynn Geddie	24†	10			8	14	Ret				5
28	(United Kingdom) David Jones	13	8	12	DNS	13	13	Ret			Ret	4
28	(United Kingdom) Godfrey Jones	13	8	12	DNS	13	13	Ret			Ret	4
29	(United Kingdom) Jody Firth			DSQ	DSQ	8	14	Ret				4
30	(United States) Charles Putman				9							3
30	(United States) Charles Espenlaub				9							3
31	(United States) Zak Brown	24†	10	Ret	19	10	18	Ret				2
32	(Brazil) Thomas Erdos			10								1.5
32	(United Kingdom) Shaun Balfe			10								1.5
33	(United Kingdom) Charlie Hollings										10	1.5
33	(Belgium) Jacques Duyver										10	1.5
34	(United Kingdom) Piers Johnson	16	17	16	Ret	17	17	11	10	21	14	1
34	(United Kingdom) Ron Johnson	16	17	16	Ret	17	17	11	10	21	14	1
35	(Portugal) Álvaro Parente			Ret	19	10	18	Ret				1
	(United Kingdom) Jody Fannin	12	11									0
	(United Kingdom) Stephen Jelley					Ret	24†	Ret	14	11		0
	(United Kingdom) Luke Hines								12	16	Ret	0
	(United Kingdom) Mike Simpson	Ret	DNS	Ret	Ret	Ret	16	Ret	13	14	Ret	0
	(United Kingdom) Rob Smith							Ret	13	14	Ret	0
	(Netherlands) Klaas Hummel				14							0
	(Luxembourg) Steve Jans				14							0
	(United Kingdom) Phil Burton				18						15	0
	(United Kingdom) Adam Wilcox				18						15	0
	(Italy) Matteo Bobbi	23†	15	Ret	27†							0
	(United Kingdom) Jay Palmer	23†	15	Ret	27†							0
	(United Kingdom) Dominic Evans	18	18	17	20†			Ret			16	0
	(United Kingdom) Tom Roche	18	18	17	20†			Ret			16	0
	(United Kingdom) Richard Sykes	Ret	DNS	Ret	Ret	Ret	16					0
	(United Kingdom) Mark Cole	Ret	16									0
	(United Kingdom) Paul McNeilly				22							0
	(United Kingdom) Jamie Stanley				22							0
	(United Kingdom) Julien Draper	Ret	26†									0
	(Paraguay) Danny Candia			Ret								0
	(United Kingdom) Oliver Webb			Ret								0
	(United Kingdom) Nathan Freke				Ret							0
	(United Kingdom) Ian Stinton				Ret							0
	(United Kingdom) Mark Blundell	DNS	DNS	DSQ	DSQ							0
	(New Zealand) Roger Wills	DNS	DNS									0
GTC Class
1	(United Kingdom) Paul Bailey								18	15	17	43.75
1	(United Kingdom) Andy Schulz								18	15	17	43.75
2	(United Kingdom) Charlie Hollings				21			19				37.5
2	(Belgium) Jacques Duyver				21			19				37.5
Pos	Driver	OUL		ROC	SIL	SNE		BRH	ZAN		DON	Pts

Colour	Result
Gold	Winner
Silver	Second place
Bronze	Third place
Green	Points classification
Blue	Non-points classification
Blue	Non-classified finish (NC)
Purple	Retired, not classified (Ret)
Red	Did not qualify (DNQ)
Red	Did not pre-qualify (DNPQ)
Black	Disqualified (DSQ)
White	Did not start (DNS)
White	Withdrew (WD)
White	Race cancelled (C)
Blank	Did not practice (DNP)
Blank	Did not arrive (DNA)
Blank	Excluded (EX)

=== GT4 ===
Pos	Driver	OUL		ROC	SIL	SNE		BRH	ZAN		DON	Pts
1	(United Kingdom) Ryan Ratcliffe	21	21	Ret	25	18	19	15	Ret	DNS	20	173
1	(United Kingdom) Rick Parfitt Jr.	21	21	Ret	25	18	19	15	Ret	DNS	20	173
2	(United Kingdom) Declan Jones	19	20	19	34	20	23	22	24	DSQ	18	171
3	(United Kingdom) Dan Eagling	DNS	DNS	20	30	21	21	17	22	23	21	146.5
3	(Czech Republic) Matt Smith	DNS	DNS	20	30	21	21	17	22	23	21	146.5
4	(United Kingdom) Alex Osborne	22	25†	Ret	28	22	20	16	23	Ret	23	133
4	(United Kingdom) James May	22	25†	Ret	28	22	20	16	23	Ret	23	133
5	(United Kingdom) Zoë Wenham	19	20	19	34	20	23	22			24†	130.5
6	(United Kingdom) Tom Wilson	Ret	Ret	18	29	19	22	18			22	115.5
6	(United Kingdom) Steve Chaplin	Ret	Ret	18	29	19	22	18			22	115.5
7	(United Kingdom) Nathan Freke								24	DSQ	18	52.5
8	(United Kingdom) Rory Bryant				35†			Ret	25†	22	24†	49
9	(United Kingdom) Adam Christodoulou				23							37.5
9	(Germany) Jörg Viebahn				23							37.5
10	(United Kingdom) David Barker								25†	22		37
11	(Netherlands) Ricardo van der Ende				24				17	Ret		27
11	(Netherlands) Bernhard van Oranje				24							27
12	(Netherlands) Cor Euser				26							18
12	(Netherlands) Rob Severs				26							18
13	(United Kingdom) Henry Taylor				31							6
13	(United Kingdom) Nigel Farmer				31							6
14	(Netherlands) Duncan Huisman				33†				16	17		3
14	(Netherlands) Luc Braams				33†				16	17		3
	(Netherlands) Pieter-Christiaan van Oranje				Ret				17	Ret		0
	(United Kingdom) Anthony Rodgers				35†			Ret				0
	(Portugal) Mauro Dias Marques				Ret							0
	(Portugal) Fábio Mota				Ret							0
	(Netherlands) Jan Joris Verheul				Ret							0
	(Netherlands) Rick Abresch				DNS							0
	(Netherlands) Nicky Pastorelli				DNS							0
Guest drivers ineligible for points
	(Netherlands) Marcel Nooren								20	18		0
	(Netherlands) Kelvin Snoeks								20	18		0
	(Netherlands) Bertus Sanders								19	19		0
	(Netherlands) Frank Wilschut								19	19		0
	(New Zealand) Richie Stanaway										19	0
	(United Kingdom) Harry Whale										19	0
	(Netherlands) Dennis van de Laar								21	20		0
	(Netherlands) Sandor van Es								21	20		0
	(United Kingdom) Adrian Barwick										25	0
	(United Kingdom) Bradley Ellis										25	0
Pos	Driver	OUL		ROC	SIL	SNE		BRH	ZAN		DON	Pts

Colour	Result
Gold	Winner
Silver	Second place
Bronze	Third place
Green	Points classification
Blue	Non-points classification
Blue	Non-classified finish (NC)
Purple	Retired, not classified (Ret)
Red	Did not qualify (DNQ)
Red	Did not pre-qualify (DNPQ)
Black	Disqualified (DSQ)
White	Did not start (DNS)
White	Withdrew (WD)
White	Race cancelled (C)
Blank	Did not practice (DNP)
Blank	Did not arrive (DNA)
Blank	Excluded (EX)
