= 2021 6 Hours of Abu Dhabi =

Endurance automotive competition

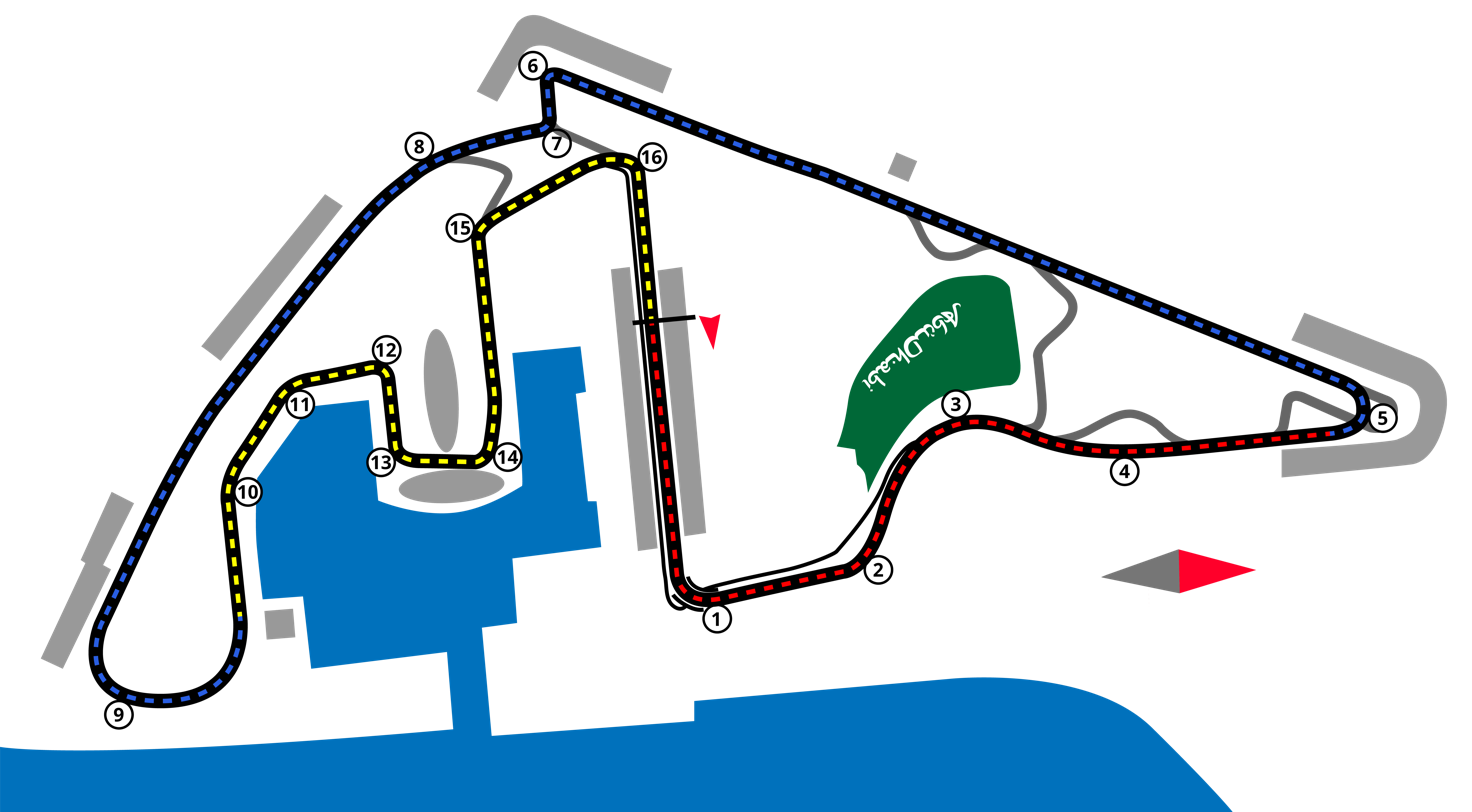
Yas Marina Circuit, Abu Dubai

The 2021 6 Hours of Abu Dhabi (formally known as the Hankook 6 Hours Abu Dhabi), was the inaugural running of the 6 Hours of Abu Dhabi, an endurance race that took place at the Yas Marina Circuit on 23 January 2021. The race was a non-championship round, as part of the 24H Series.

The race was won by Antares Au, Chris Froggatt and Ian Loggie in the #88 Car Collection Motorsport Audi R8 LMS Evo.

== Schedule ==
| Date | Time (local: GST) | Event | Duration |
|---|---|---|---|
| Friday, 22 January | 16:45 - 17:45 | Free Practice | 60 minutes |
| Saturday, 23 January | 8:30 - 9:00 | Qualifying | 30 Minutes |
| Saturday, 23 January | 12:00 - 18:00 | Race | 6 Hours |

== Teams and Drivers ==
The entry list consisted of 14 cars; 4 were entered in GT, 1 was entered in 991, and 9 were entered in TG.

| No. | Team | Car | Driver 1 | Driver 2 | Driver 3 |
GT (4 entries)
| 72 | (United Kingdom) Inception Racing by Optimum | McLaren 720S GT3 | (United States) Brendan Iribe | (United Kingdom) Ollie Millroy | |
| 88 | (Germany) Car Collection Motorsport | Audi R8 LMS Evo | (Hong Kong) Antares Au | (United Kingdom) Chris Froggatt | (United Kingdom) Ian Loggie |
| 99 | (Germany) Attempto Racing | Audi R8 LMS Evo | (Germany) Alex Aka | (United Kingdom) Finlay Hutchison | (Germany) Markus Winkelhock |
| 710 | (Germany) Leipert Motorsport | Lamborghini Huracán Super Trofeo Evo | (United States) Gerhard Watzinger | (United States) Gregg Gorski | (Germany) Fidel Leib |
991 (1 entry)
| 924 | (Germany) PROFILDOORS by Huber Racing | Porsche 991 GT3 II Cup | (Luxembourg) Gabriele Rindone | (Germany) Matthias Hoffsümmer | (Germany) Manuel Lauck |
TG (9 entries)
| 101 | (Netherlands) Red Camel-Jordans.nl | Cupra TCR DSG | (Netherlands) Ivo Breukers | (Netherlands) Rik Breukers | (United States) Max Hanratty |
| 133 | (Hungary) Zengő Motorsport | Cupra TCR DSG | (Hungary) Csaba Tóth | (Hungary) Zoltán Zengő | |
| 138 | (United Kingdom) Simpson Motorsport | Audi RS3 LMS DSG | (United Kingdom) Sacha Kakad | (United Kingdom) Ricky Coomber | (Republic of Ireland) Jonathan Mullan |
| 208 | (Belgium) PK Carsport | BMW M2 CS Racing | (Belgium) Bert Longin | (Belgium) Peter Guelinckx | (Belgium) Stienes Longin |
| 215 | (Denmark) Sally Racing | Cupra DSG | (Denmark) Morten Eriksen | (Denmark) Bjarne Haa | (Denmark) Jesper Sally |
| 218 | (Denmark) Sally Racing | Cupra DSG | (Denmark) Peter Obel | (Denmark) Mikkel Obel | (Denmark) Martin Sally Pedersen |
| 278 | (United Kingdom) CWS Engineering | Ginetta G55 Supercup | (United Kingdom) Colin White | (United States) Jean-Francois Brunot | |
| 280 | (United Kingdom) CWS Engineering | Ginetta G55 Supercup | (Germany) Michael Tischner | (United Kingdom) Simon Orange | (United Kingdom) Colin White |
| 438 | (Canada) ST Racing | BMW M4 GT4 | (Canada) Samantha Tan | (United States) Jon Miller | |

== Results ==
=== Qualifying ===
Pole positions in each class are denoted in bold.

| Pos. | Class | No. | Team | Car | Time |
|---|---|---|---|---|---|
| 1 | **GT** | **72** | **(United Kingdom) Inception Racing by Optimum** | **McLaren 720S GT3** | **2:09.008** |
| 2 | GT | 99 | (Germany) Attempto Racing | Audi R8 LMS Evo | 2:09.145 |
| 3 | GT | 88 | (Germany) Car Collection Motorsport | Audi R8 LMS Evo | 2:09.939 |
| 4 | GT | 710 | (Germany) Leipert Motorsport | Lamborghini Huracán Super Trofeo Evo | 2:11.039 |
| 5 | **991** | **924** | **(Germany) PROFILDOORS by Huber Racing** | **Porsche 991 GT3 II Cup** | **2:13.770** |
| 6 | **TG** | **438** | **(Canada) ST Racing** | **BMW M4 GT4** | **2:23.473** |
| 7 | TG | 278 | (United Kingdom) CWS Engineering | Ginetta G55 Supercup | 2:23.514 |
| 8 | TG | 280 | (United Kingdom) CWS Engineering | Ginetta G55 Supercup | 2:23.797 |
| 9 | TG | 101 | (Netherlands) Red Camel-Jordans.nl | Cupra TCR DSG | 2:24.309 |
| 10 | TG | 208 | (Belgium) PK Carsport | BMW M2 CS Racing | 2:24.462 |
| 11 | TG | 138 | (United Kingdom) Simpson Motorsport | Audi RS3 LMS DSG | 2:26.583 |
| 12 | TG | 133 | (Hungary) Zengő Motorsport | Cupra TCR DSG | 2:28.640 |
| 13 | TG | 218 | (Denmark) Sally Racing | Cupra DSG | 2:30.119 |
| 14 | TG | 215 | (Denmark) Sally Racing | Cupra DSG | 2:32.809 |

=== Race ===
Class winners are denoted in bold.

| Pos | Class | No. | Team | Drivers | Chassis | Time/Reason | Laps |
| Pos | Class | No. | Team | Drivers | Engine | Time/Reason | Laps |
|---|---|---|---|---|---|---|---|
| 1 | **GT** | **88** | **(Germany) Car Collection Motorsport** | **(Hong Kong) Antares Au** **(United Kingdom) Chris Froggatt** **(United Kingdom) Ian Loggie** | **Audi R8 LMS Evo** | **6:00:22.936** | **140** |
| 1 | **GT** | **88** | **(Germany) Car Collection Motorsport** | **(Hong Kong) Antares Au** **(United Kingdom) Chris Froggatt** **(United Kingdom) Ian Loggie** | **Audi DAR 5.2 L V10** | **6:00:22.936** | **140** |
| 2 | GT | 710 | (Germany) Leipert Motorsport | (United States) Gerhard Watzinger (United States) Gregg Gorski (Germany) Fidel Leib | Lamborghini Huracán Super Trofeo Evo | +3 Laps | 137 |
| 2 | GT | 710 | (Germany) Leipert Motorsport | (United States) Gerhard Watzinger (United States) Gregg Gorski (Germany) Fidel Leib | Lamborghini DGF 5.2 L V10 | +3 Laps | 137 |
| 3 | **991** | **924** | **(Germany) PROFILDOORS by Huber Racing** | **(Luxembourg) Gabriele Rindone** **(Germany) Matthias Hoffsümmer** **(Germany) Manuel Lauck** | **Porsche 991 GT3 II Cup** | **+3 Laps** | **137** |
| 3 | **991** | **924** | **(Germany) PROFILDOORS by Huber Racing** | **(Luxembourg) Gabriele Rindone** **(Germany) Matthias Hoffsümmer** **(Germany) Manuel Lauck** | **Porsche 4.0 L Flat-6** | **+3 Laps** | **137** |
| 4 | **TG** | **438** | **(Canada) ST Racing** | **(Canada) Samantha Tan** **(United States) Jon Miller** | **BMW M4 GT4** | **+10 Laps** | **130** |
| 4 | **TG** | **438** | **(Canada) ST Racing** | **(Canada) Samantha Tan** **(United States) Jon Miller** | **BMW N55 3.0 L Twin-Turbo I6** | **+10 Laps** | **130** |
| 5 | TG | 218 | (Denmark) Sally Racing | (Denmark) Peter Obel (Denmark) Mikkel Obel (Denmark) Martin Sally Pedersen | Cupra DSG | +14 Laps | 126 |
| 5 | TG | 218 | (Denmark) Sally Racing | (Denmark) Peter Obel (Denmark) Mikkel Obel (Denmark) Martin Sally Pedersen | Volkswagen EA888 2.0 L I4 | +14 Laps | 126 |
| 6 | TG | 208 | (Belgium) PK Carsport | (Belgium) Bert Longin (Belgium) Peter Guelinckx (Belgium) Stienes Longin | BMW M2 CS Racing | +15 Laps | 125 |
| 6 | TG | 208 | (Belgium) PK Carsport | (Belgium) Bert Longin (Belgium) Peter Guelinckx (Belgium) Stienes Longin | BMW N55 3.0 L Twin-Turbo I6 | +15 Laps | 125 |
| 7 | TG | 278 | (United Kingdom) CWS Engineering | (United Kingdom) Colin White (United States) Jean-Francois Brunot | Ginetta G55 Supercup | +17 Laps | 123 |
| 7 | TG | 278 | (United Kingdom) CWS Engineering | (United Kingdom) Colin White (United States) Jean-Francois Brunot | Ford Cyclone 3.7 L V6 | +17 Laps | 123 |
| 8 | TG | 215 | (Denmark) Sally Racing | (Denmark) Morten Eriksen (Denmark) Bjarne Haa (Denmark) Jesper Sally | Cupra DSG | +17 Laps | 123 |
| 8 | TG | 215 | (Denmark) Sally Racing | (Denmark) Morten Eriksen (Denmark) Bjarne Haa (Denmark) Jesper Sally | Volkswagen EA888 2.0 L I4 | +17 Laps | 123 |
| 9 | TG | 101 | (Netherlands) Red Camel-Jordans.nl | (Netherlands) Ivo Breukers (Netherlands) Rik Breukers (United States) Max Hanratty | Cupra TCR DSG | +24 Laps | 116 |
| 9 | TG | 101 | (Netherlands) Red Camel-Jordans.nl | (Netherlands) Ivo Breukers (Netherlands) Rik Breukers (United States) Max Hanratty | Volkswagen EA888 2.0 L I4 | +24 Laps | 116 |
| 10 | TG | 280 | (United Kingdom) CWS Engineering | (Germany) Michael Tischner (United Kingdom) Simon Orange (United Kingdom) Colin White | Ginetta G55 Supercup | +25 Laps | 115 |
| 10 | TG | 280 | (United Kingdom) CWS Engineering | (Germany) Michael Tischner (United Kingdom) Simon Orange (United Kingdom) Colin White | Ford Cyclone 3.7 L V6 | +25 Laps | 115 |
| 11 | TG | 133 | (Hungary) Zengő Motorsport | (Hungary) Csaba Tóth (Hungary) Zoltán Zengő | Cupra TCR DSG | +27 Laps | 113 |
| 11 | TG | 133 | (Hungary) Zengő Motorsport | (Hungary) Csaba Tóth (Hungary) Zoltán Zengő | Volkswagen EA888 2.0 L I4 | +27 Laps | 113 |
| 12 | GT | 72 | (United Kingdom) Inception Racing by Optimum | (United States) Brendan Iribe (United Kingdom) Ollie Millroy | McLaren 720S GT3 | +56 Laps | 84 |
| 12 | GT | 72 | (United Kingdom) Inception Racing by Optimum | (United States) Brendan Iribe (United Kingdom) Ollie Millroy | McLaren M840T 4.0 L Turbo V8 | +56 Laps | 84 |
| 13 | TG | 138 | (United Kingdom) Simpson Motorsport | (United Kingdom) Sacha Kakad (United Kingdom) Ricky Coomber (Republic of Ireland) Jonathan Mullan | Audi RS3 LMS DSG | +58 Laps | 82 |
| 13 | TG | 138 | (United Kingdom) Simpson Motorsport | (United Kingdom) Sacha Kakad (United Kingdom) Ricky Coomber (Republic of Ireland) Jonathan Mullan | Volkswagen EA888 2.0 L I4 | +58 Laps | 82 |
| 14 | GT | 99 | (Germany) Attempto Racing | (Germany) Alex Aka (United Kingdom) Finlay Hutchison (Germany) Markus Winkelhock | Audi R8 LMS Evo | +74 Laps | 66 |
| 14 | GT | 99 | (Germany) Attempto Racing | (Germany) Alex Aka (United Kingdom) Finlay Hutchison (Germany) Markus Winkelhock | Audi DAR 5.2 L V10 | +74 Laps | 66 |
