= 2012 British GT Championship =

Sports car racing season

Seasons
- ← 2011 2013 →

The 2012 Avon Tyres British GT season was the 20th season of the British GT Championship. The season began on 9 April at Oulton Park and finished on 30 September at Donington Park, after ten rounds held over seven meetings. Motorbase Performance drivers Michael Caine and Daniele Perfetti won the GT3 category in a Porsche 997 GT3-R, Team WFR's Jody Fanin and Warren Hughes won the GT4 championship driving a Ginetta G50, while Ryan Hooker and Gary Eastwood took the GTC title in a Ferrari 458 Challenge driving for FF Corse.

== Class structure ==
For the 2012 season, British GT contained four key classes. The GT3 class allows FIA homologated GT3 cars, such as the Ferrari 458 Italia, Mercedes-Benz SLS AMG GT3 or new Aston Martin V12 Vantage GT3. The GT3B class caters for older, GT3 spec cars which do not conform to the latest FIA homologations, such as the Dodge Viper Competition Coupe or Ferrari F430.

The GT4 class is a merger of Supersport-spec cars and GT4 homologated cars, such as the Lotus Evora or Ginetta G50. The GTC class caters for cars currently used in the Porsche Supercup and Ferrari Challenge series, based on the Porsche 997 and Ferrari F430 road cars.

== Entry list ==
2012 Entry List
| Team | No. | Drivers | Class | Chassis | Engine | Rounds |
|---|---|---|---|---|---|---|
| (United Kingdom) Beechdean Motorsport | 007 | (United Kingdom) Jonathan Adam | GT3 | Aston Martin V12 Vantage GT3 | Aston Martin 6.0L V12 | All |
| (United Kingdom) Beechdean Motorsport | 007 | (United Kingdom) Andrew Howard | GT3 | Aston Martin V12 Vantage GT3 | Aston Martin 6.0L V12 | All |
| (United Kingdom) Apex Motorsport | 1 | (United Kingdom) Glynn Geddie | GT3 | McLaren MP4-12C GT3 | McLaren M838T 3.8L Turbo V8 | 9 |
| (United Kingdom) Apex Motorsport | 1 | (United Kingdom) Jim Geddie | GT3 | McLaren MP4-12C GT3 | McLaren M838T 3.8L Turbo V8 | 9 |
| (Denmark) Rosso Verde | 3 | (United Kingdom) Hector Lester | GT3 | Ferrari 458 Italia GT3 | Ferrari 4.5L V8 | 1–6, 10 |
| (Denmark) Rosso Verde | 3 | (Denmark) Allan Simonsen | GT3 | Ferrari 458 Italia GT3 | Ferrari 4.5L V8 | 1–6, 10 |
| (United Kingdom) Speedworks Motorsport | 4 | (United Kingdom) Piers Johnson | GT3 | Corvette Z06.R GT3 | Chevrolet LS7 7.0L V8 | All |
| (United Kingdom) Speedworks Motorsport | 4 | (United Kingdom) Ron Johnson | GT3 | Corvette Z06.R GT3 | Chevrolet LS7 7.0L V8 | All |
| (United Kingdom) Scuderia Vittoria | 5 | (United Kingdom) Aaron Scott | GT3 | Ferrari 458 Italia GT3 | Ferrari 4.5L V8 | All |
| (United Kingdom) Scuderia Vittoria | 5 | (United Kingdom) John Dhillon | GT3 | Ferrari 458 Italia GT3 | Ferrari 4.5L V8 | All |
| (United Kingdom) JMH Automotive | 9 | (United Kingdom) Benji Hetherington | GT3 | Nissan GT-R Nismo GT3 | Nissan VR38DETT 3.8L Turbo V6 | 1–6 |
| (United Kingdom) JMH Automotive | 9 | (United Kingdom) Freddie Hetherington | GT3 | Nissan GT-R Nismo GT3 | Nissan VR38DETT 3.8L Turbo V6 | 1–6 |
| (United Kingdom) JMH Automotive | 12 | (United Kingdom) Adam Wilcox | GT3 | Ferrari 430 Scuderia GT3 | Ferrari 4.5L V8 | 7–9 |
| (United Kingdom) JMH Automotive | 12 | (United Kingdom) Phil Burton | GT3 | Ferrari 430 Scuderia GT3 | Ferrari 4.5L V8 | 7–9 |
| (United Kingdom) Predator CCTV Racing | 12 | (United Kingdom) Adam Wilcox | GT3 | Ferrari 430 Scuderia GT3 | Ferrari 4.5L V8 | 1–6 |
| (United Kingdom) Predator CCTV Racing | 12 | (United Kingdom) Phil Burton | GT3 | Ferrari 430 Scuderia GT3 | Ferrari 4.5L V8 | 1–6 |
| (United Kingdom) Motorbase Performance | 10 | (United Kingdom) Steve Parish | GT3 | Porsche 997 GT3-R | Porsche 4.0L Flat-6 | All |
| (United Kingdom) Motorbase Performance | 10 | (United Kingdom) Nick Tandy | GT3 | Porsche 997 GT3-R | Porsche 4.0L Flat-6 | 1–4 |
| (United Kingdom) Motorbase Performance | 10 | (United Kingdom) Stephen Jelley | GT3 | Porsche 997 GT3-R | Porsche 4.0L Flat-6 | 5–6, 10 |
| (United Kingdom) Motorbase Performance | 10 | (United Kingdom) Benji Hetherington | GT3 | Porsche 997 GT3-R | Porsche 4.0L Flat-6 | 7–9 |
| (United Kingdom) Motorbase Performance | 11 | (United Kingdom) Michael Caine | GT3 | Porsche 997 GT3-R | Porsche 4.0L Flat-6 | All |
| (United Kingdom) Motorbase Performance | 11 | (Switzerland) Daniele Perfetti | GT3 | Porsche 997 GT3-R | Porsche 4.0L Flat-6 | All |
| (United Kingdom) Stark Racing with Hepworth | 14 | (United Kingdom) Ian Stinton | GT3 | Ginetta G55 GT3 | Ginetta 4.3L V8 | 1–2, 5–10 |
| (United Kingdom) Stark Racing with Hepworth | 14 | (United Kingdom) Jake Rattenbury | GT3 | Ginetta G55 GT3 | Ginetta 4.3L V8 | 1–2, 5–10 |
| (United Kingdom) Team WFR | 15 | (United Kingdom) Jody Firth | GT3 | Ginetta G55 GT3 | Ginetta 4.3L V8 | 1–6, 9 |
| (United Kingdom) Team WFR | 15 | (United Kingdom) Riki Christodoulou | GT3 | Ginetta G55 GT3 | Ginetta 4.3L V8 | 1–6, 9 |
| (United Kingdom) Team WFR | 55 | (United Kingdom) Warren Hughes | GT4 | Ginetta G50 GT4 | Ford Cyclone 3.5L V6 | All |
| (United Kingdom) Team WFR | 55 | (United Kingdom) Jody Fannin | GT4 | Ginetta G50 GT4 | Ford Cyclone 3.5L V6 | All |
| (United Kingdom) Team LNT | 16 | (United Kingdom) Lawrence Tomlinson | GT3 | Ginetta G55 GT3 | Ginetta 4.3L V8 | 9–10 |
| (United Kingdom) Team LNT | 16 | (United Kingdom) Mike Simpson | GT3 | Ginetta G55 GT3 | Ginetta 4.3L V8 | 9–10 |
| (United Kingdom) Cyber Racing – AMR | 17 | (United Kingdom) John Gaw | GT3 | Aston Martin V12 Vantage GT3 | Aston Martin 6.0L V12 | 9–10 |
| (United Kingdom) Cyber Racing – AMR | 17 | (United Kingdom) Phil Dryburgh | GT3 | Aston Martin V12 Vantage GT3 | Aston Martin 6.0L V12 | 9–10 |
| (United Kingdom) Optimum Motorsport | 18 | (United Kingdom) George Murrells | GT3 | Ginetta G55 GT3 | Ginetta 4.3L V8 | 1–6, 9–10 |
| (United Kingdom) Optimum Motorsport | 18 | (United Kingdom) David McDonald | GT3 | Ginetta G55 GT3 | Ginetta 4.3L V8 | 1–2 |
| (United Kingdom) Optimum Motorsport | 18 | (United Kingdom) Luke Hines | GT3 | Ginetta G55 GT3 | Ginetta 4.3L V8 | 3–4, 6, 9 |
| (United Kingdom) Optimum Motorsport | 18 | (United Kingdom) Mike Simpson | GT3 | Ginetta G55 GT3 | Ginetta 4.3L V8 | 5 |
| (United Kingdom) Optimum Motorsport | 18 | (United Kingdom) John Hartshorne | GT3 | Ginetta G55 GT3 | Ginetta 4.3L V8 | 9–10 |
| (United Kingdom) Optimum Motorsport | 52 | (United Kingdom) Lee Mowle | GT4 | Ginetta G50 | Ford Cyclone 3.5L V6 | 3–4, 7–9 |
| (United Kingdom) Optimum Motorsport | 52 | (United Kingdom) Ryan Ratcliffe | GT4 | Ginetta G50 | Ford Cyclone 3.5L V6 | 3–4 |
| (United Kingdom) Optimum Motorsport | 52 | (United Kingdom) George Murrells | GT4 | Ginetta G50 | Ford Cyclone 3.5L V6 | 7–8 |
| (United Kingdom) Optimum Motorsport | 52 | (United Kingdom) Gary Simms | GT4 | Ginetta G50 | Ford Cyclone 3.5L V6 | 9 |
| (United Kingdom) MTECH Racing | 21 | (Republic of Ireland) Matt Griffin | GT3 | Ferrari 458 Italia GT3 | Ferrari 4.5L V8 | All |
| (United Kingdom) MTECH Racing | 21 | (United Kingdom) Duncan Cameron | GT3 | Ferrari 458 Italia GT3 | Ferrari 4.5L V8 | All |
| (United Kingdom) Team Preci-Spark | 22 | (United Kingdom) David Jones | GT3 | Mercedes-Benz SLS AMG GT3 | Mercedes-AMG 6.2L V8 | 1–6, 9–10 |
| (United Kingdom) Team Preci-Spark | 22 | (United Kingdom) Godfrey Jones | GT3 | Mercedes-Benz SLS AMG GT3 | Mercedes-AMG 6.2L V8 | 1–6, 9–10 |
| (United States) United Autosports | 23 | (United Kingdom) Matt Bell | GT3 | Audi R8 LMS; Audi R8 LMS Ultra | Audi 5.2L V10 | 1–6 |
| (United States) United Autosports | 23 | (United Kingdom) Charles Bateman | GT3 | Audi R8 LMS; Audi R8 LMS Ultra | Audi 5.2L V10 | 1–6 |
| (United States) United Autosports | 24 | (United Kingdom) Matt Bell | GT3 | McLaren MP4-12C GT3 | McLaren M838T 3.8L Turbo V8 | 7–10 |
| (United States) United Autosports | 24 | (United Kingdom) Charles Bateman | GT3 | McLaren MP4-12C GT3 | McLaren M838T 3.8L Turbo V8 | 7–10 |
| (United States) United Autosports | 27 | (Portugal) Álvaro Parente | GT3 | McLaren MP4-12C GT3 | McLaren M838T 3.8L Turbo V8 | 10 |
| (United States) United Autosports | 27 | (United States) Zak Brown | GT3 | McLaren MP4-12C GT3 | McLaren M838T 3.8L Turbo V8 | 10 |
| (Sweden) JB Motorsport | 25 | (Sweden) Jan Brunstedt | GT3 | Audi R8 LMS | Audi 5.2L V10 | 3–4 |
| (Sweden) JB Motorsport | 25 | (Sweden) Mikael Bender | GT3 | Audi R8 LMS | Audi 5.2L V10 | 3–4 |
| (United Kingdom) Wessex Vehicles | 26 | (United Kingdom) Bob Berridge | GT3 | Audi R8 LMS | Audi 5.2L V10 | 9 |
| (United Kingdom) Wessex Vehicles | 26 | (United Kingdom) Nigel Mustill | GT3 | Audi R8 LMS | Audi 5.2L V10 | 9 |
| (United Kingdom) Wessex Vehicles | 26 | (United Kingdom) Craig Dolby | GT3 | Audi R8 LMS | Audi 5.2L V10 | 9 |
| (United Kingdom) Trackspeed | 31 | (United Kingdom) David Ashburn | GT3 | Porsche 997 GT3-R | Porsche 4.0L Flat-6 | All |
| (United Kingdom) Trackspeed | 31 | (United Kingdom) Richard Westbrook | GT3 | Porsche 997 GT3-R | Porsche 4.0L Flat-6 | 1–4, 7–8 |
| (United Kingdom) Trackspeed | 31 | (United Kingdom) Phil Keen | GT3 | Porsche 997 GT3-R | Porsche 4.0L Flat-6 | 5, 9–10 |
| (United Kingdom) Trackspeed | 31 | (France) Nicolas Armindo | GT3 | Porsche 997 GT3-R | Porsche 4.0L Flat-6 | 6 |
| (United Kingdom) Trackspeed | 32 | (United Kingdom) Joe Osborne | GT3 | Porsche 997 GT3-R | Porsche 4.0L Flat-6 | All |
| (United Kingdom) Trackspeed | 32 | (United Kingdom) Steve Tandy | GT3 | Porsche 997 GT3-R | Porsche 4.0L Flat-6 | All |
| (United Kingdom) Trackspeed | 33 | (United Kingdom) Tim Harvey | GT3 | Porsche 997 GT3-R | Porsche 4.0L Flat-6 | All |
| (United Kingdom) Trackspeed | 33 | (United Kingdom) Jon Minshaw | GT3 | Porsche 997 GT3-R | Porsche 4.0L Flat-6 | All |
| (Germany) Rhino's Leipert Motorsport | 34 | (Germany) Marcel Leipert | GT3 | Lamborghini Gallardo LP600+ GT3 | Lamborghini 5.2 L V10 | 3–4, 9 |
| (Germany) Rhino's Leipert Motorsport | 34 | (United Kingdom) Marco Attard | GT3 | Lamborghini Gallardo LP600+ GT3 | Lamborghini 5.2 L V10 | 3–4, 7–9 |
| (Germany) Rhino's Leipert Motorsport | 34 | (Austria) Hari Proczyk | GT3 | Lamborghini Gallardo LP600+ GT3 | Lamborghini 5.2 L V10 | 7–8 |
| (United Kingdom) RJN Motorsport | 35 | (United Kingdom) Alex Buncombe | GT3 | Nissan GT-R GT3 | Nissan VR38DETT 3.8L Turbo V6 | All |
| (United Kingdom) RJN Motorsport | 35 | (United Kingdom) Jann Mardenborough | GT3 | Nissan GT-R GT3 | Nissan VR38DETT 3.8L Turbo V6 | All |
| (Germany) Reiter Engineering | 36 | (Netherlands) Peter Kox | GT3 | Lamborghini Gallardo LP600+ GT3 | Lamborghini 5.2 L V10 | 10 |
| (Germany) Reiter Engineering | 36 | (Netherlands) Nico Pronk | GT3 | Lamborghini Gallardo LP600+ GT3 | Lamborghini 5.2 L V10 | 10 |
| (United Kingdom) Century Motorsport | 42 | (United Kingdom) Zoë Wenham | GT4 | Ginetta G50 | Ford Cyclone 3.5L V6 | All |
| (United Kingdom) Century Motorsport | 42 | (United Kingdom) Mike Simpson | GT4 | Ginetta G50 | Ford Cyclone 3.5L V6 | 1–2 |
| (United Kingdom) Century Motorsport | 42 | (United Kingdom) Dominic Evans | GT4 | Ginetta G50 | Ford Cyclone 3.5L V6 | 3–10 |
| (United Kingdom) Barwell Motorsport | 45 | (United Kingdom) Ben de Zille Butler | GT4 | Ginetta G50 | Ford Cyclone 3.5L V6 | 6 |
| (United Kingdom) Barwell Motorsport | 45 | (United Kingdom) Peter Erceg | GT4 | Ginetta G50 | Ford Cyclone 3.5L V6 | 6 |
| (United Kingdom) Jota Group | 47 | (United Kingdom) Owen Mildenhall | GT4 | Mazda MX-5 GT | Mazda 2.0L I4 | 3–10 |
| (United Kingdom) Jota Group | 47 | (United Kingdom) Mark Ticehurst | GT4 | Mazda MX-5 GT | Mazda 2.0L I4 | 3–10 |
| (United Kingdom) Lotus Sport UK | 48 | (India) Sailesh Bolisetti | GT4 | Lotus Evora | Toyota 2GR-FE 4.0L V6 | 1–6 |
| (United Kingdom) Lotus Sport UK | 48 | (United Kingdom) Phil Glew | GT4 | Lotus Evora | Toyota 2GR-FE 4.0L V6 | 1–6 |
| (United Kingdom) Lotus Sport UK | 49 | (United Kingdom) Marco Attard | GT4 | Lotus Evora | Toyota 2GR-FE 4.0L V6 | 1–2, 5 |
| (United Kingdom) Lotus Sport UK | 49 | (United Kingdom) Alistair Mackinnon | GT4 | Lotus Evora | Toyota 2GR-FE 4.0L V6 | 1–2, 5 |
| (Sweden) Nova Race | 50 | (Italy) Marco Cassera | GT4 | Ginetta G50 | Ford Cyclone 3.5L V6 | 3–4 |
| (Sweden) Nova Race | 50 | (Italy) Piero Foglio | GT4 | Ginetta G50 | Ford Cyclone 3.5L V6 | 3–4 |
| (United Kingdom) Complete Racing | 53 | (United Kingdom) Steven Chaplin | GT4 | Aston Martin V8 Vantage GT4 | Aston Martin 4.7L V8 | 7–9 |
| (United Kingdom) Complete Racing | 53 | (United Kingdom) Phil Keen | GT4 | Aston Martin V8 Vantage GT4 | Aston Martin 4.7L V8 | 7–8 |
| (United Kingdom) Complete Racing | 53 | (United Kingdom) Mike Kurton | GT4 | Aston Martin V8 Vantage GT4 | Aston Martin 4.7L V8 | 9 |
| (France) Espace Bienvenue | 56 | (France) Andre Grammatico | GT4 | BMW M3 GT4 | BMW 4.0L V8 | 3–4 |
| (United Kingdom) FF Corse | 61 | (United Kingdom) Gary Eastwood | GTC | Ferrari 458 Challenge | Ferrari 4.5L V8 | 7–10 |
| (United Kingdom) FF Corse | 61 | (United Kingdom) Ryan Hooker | GTC | Ferrari 458 Challenge | Ferrari 4.5L V8 | 7–10 |
| (United Kingdom) FF Corse | 62 | (Austria) Gerard Grohmann | GT3 | Ferrari F430 GT3 | Ferrari 4.3L V8 | 9 |
| (United Kingdom) FF Corse | 62 | (Italy) Thomas Kemenater | GT3 | Ferrari F430 GT3 | Ferrari 4.3L V8 | 9 |
| (United Kingdom) APO Sport | 69 | (United Kingdom) James May | GT4 | Ginetta G50 | Ford Cyclone 3.5L V6 | 1–9 |
| (United Kingdom) APO Sport | 69 | (United Kingdom) Alex Osborne | GT4 | Ginetta G50 | Ford Cyclone 3.5L V6 | 1–9 |
| (United Kingdom) CWS 4x4 | 78 | (United Kingdom) Colin White | GTC | Ginetta G55 Cup | Ford Cyclone 3.7L V6 | 3–4 |
| (United Kingdom) CWS 4x4 | 78 | (United Kingdom) Jake Rattenbury | GTC | Ginetta G55 Cup | Ford Cyclone 3.7L V6 | 3–4 |
| (United Kingdom) Ecurie Ecosse | 79 | (United Kingdom) Oliver Bryant | GT3 | BMW Z4 GT3 | BMW 4.4L V8 | 1–6, 10 |
| (United Kingdom) Ecurie Ecosse | 79 | (United Kingdom) Alasdair McCaig | GT3 | BMW Z4 GT3 | BMW 4.4L V8 | All |
| (United Kingdom) Ecurie Ecosse | 79 | (United Kingdom) Ollie Millroy | GT3 | BMW Z4 GT3 | BMW 4.4L V8 | 7–8 |
| (United Kingdom) Ecurie Ecosse | 79 | (United Kingdom) Ollie Hancock | GT3 | BMW Z4 GT3 | BMW 4.4L V8 | 9 |
| (United Kingdom) Chevron Racing Cars | 97 | (United Kingdom) Ray Grimes | GTC | Chevron GR8 GT4 | Ford Cosworth YD 2.0L Turbo I4 | 1–2, 7–8, 10 |
| (United Kingdom) Chevron Racing Cars | 97 | (United Kingdom) David Witt | GTC | Chevron GR8 GT4 | Ford Cosworth YD 2.0L Turbo I4 | 1–2, 7–8, 10 |
| (United Kingdom) Chevron Racing Cars | 98 | (United Kingdom) Anthony Reid | Inv | Chevron GR8 GT3 GT4 | Ford Cosworth YD 2.0L Turbo I4 | 1–2, 5, 7–10 |
| (United Kingdom) Chevron Racing Cars | 98 | (United Kingdom) Jordan Witt | Inv | Chevron GR8 GT3 GT4 | Ford Cosworth YD 2.0L Turbo I4 | 1–2, 5, 7–10 |

| Icon | Class |
|---|---|
| GT3 | GT3 Class |
| GT3B | GT3B Class |
| GT4 | GT4 Class |
| GTC | Cup Class |
| Inv | Invitation Class |

== Race calendar and results ==
The 2012 calendar announced on 30 November 2011 included a support slot at the 24 Hours Nürburgring, with race formats later confirmed on 26 January 2012. All races except German round at Nürburgring, were held in the United Kingdom.

| Round | Circuit | Date | Length | Pole position | GT3 winner | GT4 winner |
|---|---|---|---|---|---|---|
| 1 | Oulton Park | 9 April | 60 mins | No. 23 United Autosports | No. 79 Ecurie Ecosse | No. 55 Team WFR |
| 1 | Oulton Park | 9 April | 60 mins | (United Kingdom) Charles Bateman (United Kingdom) Matt Bell | (United Kingdom) Oliver Bryant (United Kingdom) Alasdair McCaig | (United Kingdom) Jody Fannin (United Kingdom) Warren Hughes |
| 2 | Oulton Park | 9 April | 60 mins | No. 31 Trackspeed | No. 31 Trackspeed | No. 55 Team WFR |
| 2 | Oulton Park | 9 April | 60 mins | (United Kingdom) Richard Westbrook (United Kingdom) David Ashburn | (United Kingdom) Richard Westbrook (United Kingdom) David Ashburn | (United Kingdom) Jody Fannin (United Kingdom) Warren Hughes |
| 3 | Nürburgring | 18 May | 60 mins | No. 35 RJN Motorsport | No. 007 Beechdean Motorsport | No. 55 Team WFR |
| 3 | Nürburgring | 18 May | 60 mins | (United Kingdom) Jann Mardenborough (United Kingdom) Alex Buncombe | (United Kingdom) Andrew Howard (United Kingdom) Jonathan Adam | (United Kingdom) Jody Fannin (United Kingdom) Warren Hughes |
| 4 | Nürburgring | 19 May | 60 mins | No. 10 Motorbase Performance | No. 21 MTECH Racing | No. 48 Lotus Sport UK |
| 4 | Nürburgring | 19 May | 60 mins | (United Kingdom) Nick Tandy (United Kingdom) Steve Parish | (Republic of Ireland) Matt Griffin (United Kingdom) Duncan Cameron | (United Kingdom) Phil Glew (India) Sailesh Bolisetti |
| 5 | Rockingham | 10 June | 120 mins | No. 10 Motorbase Performance | No. 32 Trackspeed | No. 55 Team WFR |
| 5 | Rockingham | 10 June | 120 mins | (United Kingdom) Stephen Jelley (United Kingdom) Steve Parish | (United Kingdom) Joe Osborne (United Kingdom) Steve Tandy | (United Kingdom) Jody Fannin (United Kingdom) Warren Hughes |
| 6 | Brands Hatch GP | 24 June | 120 mins | No. 10 Motorbase Performance | No. 35 RJN Motorsport | No. 55 Team WFR |
| 6 | Brands Hatch GP | 24 June | 120 mins | (United Kingdom) Stephen Jelley (United Kingdom) Steve Parish | (United Kingdom) Jann Mardenborough (United Kingdom) Alex Buncombe | (United Kingdom) Jody Fannin (United Kingdom) Warren Hughes |
| 7 | Snetterton | 5 August | 60 mins | No. 31 Trackspeed | No. 24 United Autosports | No. 52 Optimum Motorsport |
| 7 | Snetterton | 5 August | 60 mins | (United Kingdom) Richard Westbrook (United Kingdom) David Ashburn | (United Kingdom) Charles Bateman (United Kingdom) Matt Bell | (United Kingdom) Lee Mowle (United Kingdom) George Murrells |
| 8 | Snetterton | 5 August | 60 mins | No. 33 Trackspeed | No. 32 Trackspeed | No. 55 Team WFR |
| 8 | Snetterton | 5 August | 60 mins | (United Kingdom) Tim Harvey (United Kingdom) Jon Minshaw | (United Kingdom) Joe Osborne (United Kingdom) Steve Tandy | (United Kingdom) Jody Fannin (United Kingdom) Warren Hughes |
| 9 | Silverstone Arena | 8–9 September | 180 mins | No. 21 MTECH Racing | No. 24 United Autosports | No. 55 Team WFR |
| 9 | Silverstone Arena | 8–9 September | 180 mins | (Republic of Ireland) Matt Griffin (United Kingdom) Duncan Cameron | (United Kingdom) Charles Bateman (United Kingdom) Matt Bell | (United Kingdom) Jody Fannin (United Kingdom) Warren Hughes |
| 10 | Donington Park | 29–30 September | 120 mins | No. 36 Reiter Engineering | No. 27 United Autosports | No. 55 Team WFR |
| 10 | Donington Park | 29–30 September | 120 mins | (Netherlands) Peter Kox (Netherlands) Nico Pronk | (Portugal) Álvaro Parente (United States) Zak Brown | (United Kingdom) Jody Fannin (United Kingdom) Warren Hughes |

== Championship standings ==
- Points were awarded as follows:

| Length | 1 | 2 | 3 | 4 | 5 | 6 | 7 | 8 | 9 | 10 |
|---|---|---|---|---|---|---|---|---|---|---|
| 60 mins | 25 | 18 | 15 | 12 | 10 | 8 | 6 | 4 | 2 | 1 |
| 60+ mins | 37.5 | 27 | 22.5 | 18 | 15 | 12 | 9 | 6 | 3 | 1.5 |
Half points were awarded if a class had less than 3 cars

=== GT3/GTC ===
| Pos | Driver | OUL | | NÜR | | ROC | BRH | SNE | | SIL | DON | Pts |
GT3 Class
| 1 | (United Kingdom) Michael Caine | 6 | 4 | 2 | 3 | 13 | Ret | 2 | 5 | 3 | 4 | 130.5 |
| 1 | (Switzerland) Daniele Perfetti | 6 | 4 | 2 | 3 | 13 | Ret | 2 | 5 | 3 | 4 | 130.5 |
| 2 | (United Kingdom) David Ashburn | 4 | 1 | 10 | 2 | 3 | 4 | 6 | Ret | Ret | 5 | 127 |
| 3 | (United Kingdom) Charles Bateman | 15† | 5 | 13† | 6 | 9 | 11 | 1 | Ret | 1 | 3 | 121 |
| 3 | (United Kingdom) Matt Bell | 15† | 5 | 13† | 6 | 9 | 11 | 1 | Ret | 1 | 3 | 121 |
| 4 | (United Kingdom) Duncan Cameron | 3 | 2 | 4 | 1 | 4 | Ret | 4 | 10 | 7 | 10 | 119 |
| 4 | (Republic of Ireland) Matt Griffin | 3 | 2 | 4 | 1 | 4 | Ret | 4 | 10 | 7 | 10 | 119 |
| 5 | (United Kingdom) Alasdair McCaig | 1 | 10 | 5 | 9 | 7 | 3 | 8 | 4 | 2 | 11 | 115.5 |
| 6 | (United Kingdom) Alex Buncombe | 5 | 11 | 3 | 5 | 5 | 1 | Ret | 3 | 8 | 16 | 108.5 |
| 6 | (United Kingdom) Jann Mardenborough | 5 | 11 | 3 | 5 | 5 | 1 | Ret | 3 | 8 | 16 | 108.5 |
| 7 | (United Kingdom) Joe Osborne | 13 | 8 | 9 | 14 | 1 | Ret | 5 | 1 | 9 | 8 | 93.5 |
| 7 | (United Kingdom) Steve Tandy | 13 | 8 | 9 | 14 | 1 | Ret | 5 | 1 | 9 | 8 | 93.5 |
| 8 | (United Kingdom) Jonathan Adam | 9 | 15 | 1 | 7 | Ret | 2 | 3 | Ret | 15 | Ret | 75 |
| 8 | (United Kingdom) Andrew Howard | 9 | 15 | 1 | 7 | Ret | 2 | 3 | Ret | 15 | Ret | 75 |
| 9 | (United Kingdom) Oliver Bryant | 1 | 10 | 5 | 9 | 7 | 3 | | | | 11 | 69.5 |
| 10 | (United Kingdom) Richard Westbrook | 4 | 1 | 10 | 2 | | | 6 | Ret | | | 64 |
| 11 | (United Kingdom) Tim Harvey | 10 | 3 | 8 | 12 | 6 | 9 | 7 | 2 | 11 | Ret | 59 |
| 11 | (United Kingdom) Jon Minshaw | 10 | 3 | 8 | 12 | 6 | 9 | 7 | 2 | 11 | Ret | 59 |
| 12 | (United Kingdom) Hector Lester | 2 | 12 | 11 | 8 | 2 | 7 | | | | 18† | 58 |
| 12 | (Denmark) Allan Simonsen | 2 | 12 | 11 | 8 | 2 | 7 | | | | 18† | 58 |
| 13 | (United Kingdom) David Jones | 7 | 9 | 6 | 10 | Ret | 10 | | | 6 | 6 | 48.5 |
| 13 | (United Kingdom) Godfrey Jones | 7 | 9 | 6 | 10 | Ret | 10 | | | 6 | 6 | 48.5 |
| 14 | (United Kingdom) Steve Parish | 11 | 6 | Ret | 4 | 8 | 8 | 13 | 18† | 16† | 7 | 47 |
| 15 | (United Kingdom) Phil Keen | | | | | 3 | | | | Ret | 5 | 45 |
| 16 | (United Kingdom) Mike Simpson | | | | | 10 | | | | 4 | 9 | 28.5 |
| 17 | (United Kingdom) Ollie Hancock | | | | | | | | | 2 | | 27 |
| 18 | (United Kingdom) Lawrence Tomlinson | | | | | | | | | 4 | 9 | 27 |
| 19 | (United Kingdom) Stephen Jelley | | | | | 8 | 8 | | | | 7 | 27 |
| 20 | (United Kingdom) John Dhillon | 12 | 14 | 12 | 16 | Ret | 6 | 10 | 6 | Ret | 15† | 21 |
| 20 | (United Kingdom) Aaron Scott | 12 | 14 | 12 | 16 | Ret | 6 | 10 | 6 | Ret | 15† | 21 |
| 21 | (United Kingdom) Nick Tandy | 11 | 6 | Ret | 4 | | | | | | | 20 |
| 22 | (France) Nicolas Armindo | | | | | | 4 | | | | | 18 |
| 23 | (United Kingdom) George Murrells | 16 | 18 | 22† | 13 | 10 | 5 | | | Ret | 12 | 18 |
| 24 | (United Kingdom) Ollie Millroy | | | | | | | 8 | 4 | | | 16 |
| 25 | (United Kingdom) Luke Hines | | | 22† | 13 | | 5 | | | Ret | | 15 |
| 26 | (United Kingdom) Glynn Geddie | | | | | | | | | 5 | | 15 |
| 26 | (United Kingdom) Jim Geddie | | | | | | | | | 5 | | 15 |
| 27 | (United Kingdom) Marco Attard | | | 7 | 11 | | | 9 | 16† | 10 | | 11.5 |
| 28 | (United Kingdom) Benji Hetherington | 8 | 7 | Ret | 15 | 11 | Ret | 13 | 18† | 16† | | 10 |
| 28 | (United Kingdom) Freddie Hetherington | 8 | 7 | Ret | 15 | 11 | Ret | | | | | 10 |
| 29 | (Germany) Marcel Leipert | | | 7 | 11 | | | | | 10 | | 7.5 |
| 30 | (United Kingdom) Piers Johnson | Ret | 17 | Ret | 17 | 15 | Ret | 12 | 8 | 13 | Ret | 6 |
| 30 | (United Kingdom) Ron Johnson | Ret | 17 | Ret | 17 | 15 | Ret | 12 | 8 | 13 | Ret | 6 |
| 31 | (Austria) Hari Prozcyk | | | | | | | 9 | 16† | | | 4 |
| 32 | (United Kingdom) John Hartshorne | | | | | | | | | Ret | 12 | 1.5 |
| 33 | (United Kingdom) Jake Rattenbury | 23 | Ret | | | 19† | Ret | 14 | 17 | DNS | Ret | 1 |
| 33 | (United Kingdom) Ian Stinton | 23 | Ret | | | 19† | Ret | 14 | 17 | DNS | Ret | 1 |
| | (United Kingdom) Phil Burton | 18 | 13 | Ret | Ret | 20† | 17 | 11 | Ret | Ret | | 0 |
| | (United Kingdom) Adam Wilcox | 18 | 13 | Ret | Ret | 20† | 17 | 11 | Ret | Ret | | 0 |
| | (United Kingdom) Jody Firth | 14 | 16 | 14† | Ret | 12 | 18 | | | 14 | | 0 |
| | (United Kingdom) Riki Christodoulou | 14 | 16 | 14† | Ret | 12 | 18 | | | 14 | | 0 |
| | (United Kingdom) Phil Dryburgh | | | | | | | | | 12 | | 0 |
| | (United Kingdom) John Gaw | | | | | | | | | 12 | | 0 |
| | (Sweden) Jan Brunstedt | | | 15 | 18 | | | | | | | 0 |
| | (Sweden) Mikael Bender | | | 15 | 18 | | | | | | | 0 |
| | (United Kingdom) Nigel Mustill | | | | | | | | | Ret | | 0 |
| | (United Kingdom) Bob Berridge | | | | | | | | | Ret | | 0 |
| | (United Kingdom) Craig Dolby | | | | | | | | | Ret | | 0 |
| | (Austria) Gerard Grohmann | | | | | | | | | Ret | | 0 |
| | (Italy) Thomas Kemenater | | | | | | | | | Ret | | 0 |
Guest drivers ineligible for points
| | (Portugal) Álvaro Parente | | | | | | | | | | 1 | 0 |
| | (United States) Zak Brown | | | | | | | | | | 1 | 0 |
| | (Netherlands) Peter Kox | | | | | | | | | | 2 | 0 |
| | (Netherlands) Nico Pronk | | | | | | | | | | 2 | 0 |
| | (United Kingdom) Anthony Reid | 24† | 21 | | | 14 | | 21† | 7 | 23† | 20† | 0 |
| | (United Kingdom) Jordan Witt | 24† | 21 | | | 14 | | 21† | 7 | 23† | 20† | 0 |
GTC Class
| 1 | (United Kingdom) Ryan Hooker | | | | | | | 15 | 9 | 17 | 13 | 62.5 |
| 1 | (United Kingdom) Gary Eastwood | | | | | | | 15 | 9 | 17 | 13 | 62.5 |
| 2 | (United Kingdom) David Witt | 22 | 23 | | | | | Ret | DNS | | 17 | 38.5 |
| 2 | (United Kingdom) Ray Grimes | 22 | 23 | | | | | Ret | DNS | | 17 | 38.5 |
| 3 | (United Kingdom) Colin White | | | 16 | 19 | | | | | | | 25 |
| 3 | (United Kingdom) Jake Rattenbury | | | 16 | 19 | | | | | | | 25 |
| Pos | Driver | OUL | | NÜR | | ROC | BRH | SNE | | SIL | DON | Pts |

| Colour | Result |
|---|---|
| Gold | Winner |
| Silver | Second place |
| Bronze | Third place |
| Green | Points classification |
| Blue | Non-points classification |
| Blue | Non-classified finish (NC) |
| Purple | Retired, not classified (Ret) |
| Red | Did not qualify (DNQ) |
| Red | Did not pre-qualify (DNPQ) |
| Black | Disqualified (DSQ) |
| White | Did not start (DNS) |
| White | Withdrew (WD) |
| White | Race cancelled (C) |
| Blank | Did not practice (DNP) |
| Blank | Did not arrive (DNA) |
| Blank | Excluded (EX) |

† — Drivers did not finish the race, but were classified as they completed over 90% of the race distance.

=== GT4 ===
| Pos | Driver | OUL | | NÜR | | ROC | BRH | SNE | | SIL | DON | Pts |
|---|---|---|---|---|---|---|---|---|---|---|---|---|
| 1 | (United Kingdom) Jody Fannin | 17 | 19 | 17 | Ret | 16 | 12 | 19 | 11 | 18 | 14 | 243.25 |
| 1 | (United Kingdom) Warren Hughes | 17 | 19 | 17 | Ret | 16 | 12 | 19 | 11 | 18 | 14 | 243.25 |
| 2 | (United Kingdom) Zoë Wenham | 21 | 22 | 19 | 21 | 18 | 16 | 17 | 14 | 21 | 19 | 159 |
| 3 | (United Kingdom) Dominic Evans | | | 19 | 21 | 18 | 16 | 17 | 14 | 21 | 19 | 132 |
| 4 | (United Kingdom) James May | DNS | DNS | 23 | NC | 17 | 13 | 20† | 15 | 20 | | 104.5 |
| 4 | (United Kingdom) Alex Osborne | DNS | DNS | 23 | NC | 17 | 13 | 20† | 15 | 20 | | 104.5 |
| 5 | (United Kingdom) Phil Glew | 19 | 20 | 21 | 20 | Ret | Ret | | | | | 71 |
| 5 | (India) Sailesh Bolisetti | 19 | 20 | 21 | 20 | Ret | Ret | | | | | 71 |
| 6 | (United Kingdom) Mark Ticehurst | | | 20 | 24 | Ret | 14 | Ret | 12 | Ret | Ret | 62.5 |
| 6 | (United Kingdom) Owen Mildenhall | | | 20 | 24 | Ret | 14 | Ret | 12 | Ret | Ret | 62.5 |
| 7 | (United Kingdom) Lee Mowle | | | Ret | 23 | | | 16 | 19 | 19 | | 60 |
| 8 | (United Kingdom) Steven Chaplin | | | | | | | 18 | 13 | 22 | | 45 |
| 9 | (United Kingdom) George Murrells | | | | | | | 16 | 19 | | | 33 |
| 10 | (Italy) Marco Cassera | | | 18 | 22 | | | | | | | 33 |
| 10 | (Italy) Piero Foglio | | | 18 | 22 | | | | | | | 33 |
| 11 | (United Kingdom) Phil Keen | | | | | | | 18 | 13 | | | 30 |
| 12 | (United Kingdom) Gary Simms | | | | | | | | | 19 | | 27 |
| 13 | (United Kingdom) Marco Attard | 20 | 24 | | | Ret | | | | | | 27 |
| 13 | (United Kingdom) Alistair Mackinnon | 20 | 24 | | | Ret | | | | | | 27 |
| 14 | (United Kingdom) Mike Simpson | 21 | 22 | | | | | | | | | 27 |
| 15 | (United Kingdom) Ben de Zille Butler | | | | | | 15 | | | | | 18 |
| 15 | (United Kingdom) Peter Erceg | | | | | | 15 | | | | | 18 |
| 16 | (United Kingdom) Mike Kurton | | | | | | | | | 22 | | 15 |
| Pos | Driver | OUL | | NÜR | | ROC | BRH | SNE | | SIL | DON | Pts |

| Colour | Result |
|---|---|
| Gold | Winner |
| Silver | Second place |
| Bronze | Third place |
| Green | Points classification |
| Blue | Non-points classification |
| Blue | Non-classified finish (NC) |
| Purple | Retired, not classified (Ret) |
| Red | Did not qualify (DNQ) |
| Red | Did not pre-qualify (DNPQ) |
| Black | Disqualified (DSQ) |
| White | Did not start (DNS) |
| White | Withdrew (WD) |
| White | Race cancelled (C) |
| Blank | Did not practice (DNP) |
| Blank | Did not arrive (DNA) |
| Blank | Excluded (EX) |
