= Dominic Evans =

British auto racing driver (born 1970)

- Nationality: British
- Born: Cardiff, Wales

British GT Championship career
- Debut season: 2012
- Current team: Blendini Motorsport
- Car number: 11
- Former teams: Century Motorsport
- Starts: 12
- Wins: 0
- Poles: 0
- Fastest laps: 0
- Best finish: 3rd (GT4 category) in 2012

Previous series
- 2011 2008: Welsh Sports & Saloon Championship; Britcar

Championship titles
- 2011: Welsh Sports & Saloon Championship

Dominic "Dom" Evans (born 22 April 1970) is a British auto racing driver. He competed in the British GT Championship, driving with Tom Roche as 2nd driver running the car

== Career ==
=== Early career ===
Born in Cardiff, Evans competed in the Britcar championship in 2008, driving for XL Race Parts in a Porsche 911 GT3 Cup. He was partnered by three different drivers in the three races he entered: Roberts at Silverstone, Steve Bell at the first Brands Hatch round (where he got his best result, 17th, in the second race), and Mark Coleing at the second Brands Hatch round. In 2011, Evans won the Welsh Sports & Saloon Championship.

=== British GT ===
Evans first appeared in the British GT Championship in 2012, driving alongside fellow debutant Zoë Wenham for Century Motorsport in a GT4-class Ginetta G50. Having missed the first round due to licensing issues (with his seat being filled by Ginetta's Mark Simpson), Evans made his debut at the second round of the season, held at the Nürburgring GP circuit. He and Wenham finished third in the first race, and second in race two, in what proved to be a successful debut event for Evans. The season would prove to be a successful one; although a victory eluded the pairing of Evans and Wenham, Wenham was still competing for the title with two races to go (with Evans competing for the runner-up spot, as he had missed the first two races.) Following that event, however, Evans had to settle for third place, the title being won by Team WFR and their driver pairing of Jody Fannin and Warren Hughes.

For 2013, Evans moved into the GT3 category, now driving for Blendini Motorsport, alongside team boss Tom Roche in an Audi R8 LMS. It would not prove to be a successful GT3 debut for him, as he and Roche were only able to finish 18th overall in both races. He competed in four more races during the season, but did not score any points.

== Personal life ==
Evans has a son, Josh, whom competes in the Mazda MX5 Championship.
