= Optimum Motorsport =

Racing team in Wakefield, West Yorkshire

(United Kingdom) Optimum Motorsport
- Founded: 2007
- Base: Wakefield, West Yorkshire
- Team principal(s): Shaun Goff; Bas Leinders
- Current series: Asian Le Mans Series; GT World Challenge Europe; Creventic 24H; British GT Championship International GT Open IMSA SportsCar Championship
- Noted drivers: Brendan Iribe, Ollie Millroy, Graham Johnson, Will Moore, Ryan Ratcliffe, Mike Robinson, Flick Haigh, Joe Osborne, Frank Stippler
- Drivers' Championships: 2013 British GT4 Class, Dubai 24H, Mugello 24H

Optimum Motorsport is a British sports car racing team based in Wakefield, West Yorkshire that primarily competes with Ginetta and McLaren GT cars. Optimum also race under the Inception Racing banner with Ferrari. Their record includes championship wins in 2013 British GT4, class wins at 2012 and 2015 Dubai 24H, 2017 24h Series class champions, and most recently several British GT, GT Open, and AsLMS podiums and championships.

== Overview ==
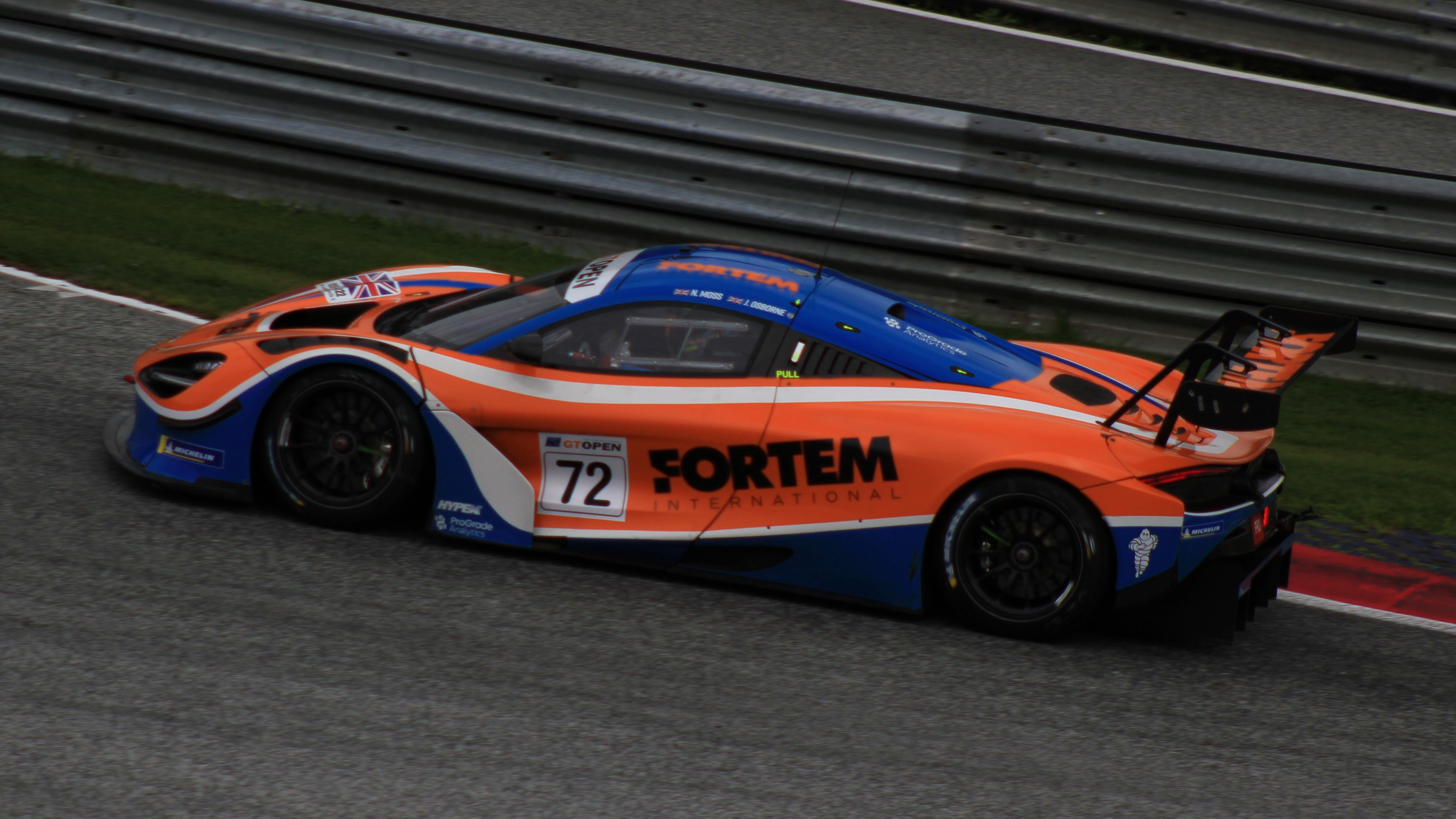
Optimum Motorsport McLaren 720S GT3 of Nick Moss and Joe Osborne at the Red Bull Ring

Optimum Motorsport is based in Wakefield, West Yorkshire, in the United Kingdom. In 2022, took part in:

- FIA World Endurance Championship in collaboration with Project 1
- IMSA Sportscar Championship (as Inception)
- Le Mans Cup making their debut in prototype racing with a Duqueine D-08
- Asian Le Mans Series (as both Optimum and Inception, one car apiece)
- International GT Open (as Inception Racing)
- British GT Championship in GT3 with McLaren customer cars (and historically, Optimum have additionally run Aston Martin in the GT4 class)

In previous years Optimum have additionally campaigned in the Creventic 24H endurance series.

== Racing record ==
=== British GT results ===
British GT results
Year	Car	Class	Drivers	Wins	Podiums	Points	D.C.	T.C.
2012	Ginetta G55	GT3	(United Kingdom) George Murrells (United Kingdom) David McDonald (United Kingdom) Luke Hines (United Kingdom) Mike Simpson (United Kingdom) John Hartshorne		3	28.5		
2012	Ginetta G50	GT4	(United Kingdom) Lee Mowle (United Kingdom) Ryan Ratcliffe (United Kingdom) George Murrells (United Kingdom) Gary Simms		1	60		
2013	Ginetta G50	GT4	(United Kingdom) Ryan Ratcliffe (United Kingdom) Rick Parfitt Jr.	3	7	173	1st	1st
2014	Ginetta G55	GT4	(United Kingdom) Matt Draper (New Zealand) Tania Mann (United Kingdom) Ryan Ratcliffe (United Kingdom) Jade Edwards		1	131	9th	8th
2015	Ginetta G55	GT4	(United Kingdom) Mike Robinson (United Kingdom) Graham Johnson	2	5	131	2nd	3rd
2015	Ginetta G55	GT4	(United Kingdom) Charlie Hollings (United Kingdom) Alistair Barclay					3rd
2016	Audi R8 LMS GT3	GT3	(United Kingdom) Ryan Ratcliffe (United Kingdom) Will Moore	2	2	97	1st	1st
2016	PMW Expo Ginetta G55	GT4	(United Kingdom) Mike Robinson (United Kingdom) Graham Johnson			36	9th	9th

2016 current season running

=== 24 Hours of Le Mans results ===
Year	Entrant	No.	Car	Drivers	Class	Laps	Pos.	Class Pos.
2021	(United Kingdom) Inception Racing	71	Ferrari 488 GTE Evo	(United Kingdom) Ben Barnicoat (United States) Brendan Iribe (United Kingdom) Ollie Millroy	LMGTE Am	327	41st	12th
2022	(Germany) Team Project 1	56	Porsche 911 RSR-19	(United Kingdom) Ben Barnicoat (United States) Brendan Iribe (United Kingdom) Ollie Millroy	LMGTE Am	241	DNF	DNF
2022	(United Kingdom) Inception Racing	59	Ferrari 488 GTE Evo	(France) Marvin Klein (France) Côme Ledogar (Sweden) Alexander West	LMGTE Am	190	DNF	DNF
2024	(United Kingdom) Inception Racing	70	McLaren 720S GT3 Evo	(United States) Brendan Iribe (United Kingdom) Ollie Millroy (Denmark) Frederik Schandorff	LMGT3	275	40th	13th
