= Zoë Wenham =

British auto racing driver (born 1994)

- Nationality: British
- Born: 7 May 1994 (age 32) Cheltenham, Gloucestershire, England

British GT Championship career
- Debut season: 2012
- Current team: Blendini/Triple-R
- Car number: 45
- Former teams: Century Motorsport
- Starts: 13
- Wins: 2
- Poles: 0
- Fastest laps: 0
- Best finish: 2nd (GT4 category) in 2012

Previous series
- 2010–2011 2008–2009: Volkswagen Racing Cup; SAXMAX

Awards
- 2013: BWRDC Elite GoldStar Award

Zoë Claire Wenham (born 7 May 1994) is a British auto racing driver.

Wenham started her career in karting, competing in various championships between 2004 and 2008, before she switched to car racing in 2008, entering the SAXMAX series. She competed in that series for two years, before moving into the Volkswagen Racing Cup, where she competed for another two years. She made her move into the British GT Championship in 2012, taking second in the GT4 category in her debut season, driving for Century Motorsport. Her performances in the series saw her win the BWRDC Elite GoldStar Award at the start of 2013.

== Racing career ==
=== Early career ===
Born in Cheltenham, Gloucestershire, Wenham first appeared in karting in 2004, competing in the 2CKC Cadet Championship, which she won at her first attempt. In 2005, she entered the BWRDC Kartsport Trophy, the Clay Pigeon Kart Club Championship Comer Cadet and the Hoddesdon Kart Club Championship Comer Cadet championships, finishing fourth, first and sixth respectively. For 2006 and 2007, she competed in the Clay Pigeon Kart Club Championship Minimax and the Hoddesdon Kart Club Championship Minimax championships once more, with her best result coming in the latter series in 2007, with a third place overall finish. For 2008, she entered the Ace & King of Clubs Meeting Rotax Junior, finishing 20th, and also made her car racing debut in the SAXMAX series, finishing 16th overall, having entered nine races. She returned to the series for 2009, this time driving for Ferguson Motorsports and finishing ninth, having competed in the whole season. For 2010, although she had two outings in the SAXMAX series, she moved to the Volkswagen Racing Cup, driving a Volkswagen Golf GTI entered by KPM Racing, where she finished 21st overall, becoming the series' youngest ever driver. She remained in the series in 2011, now driving for Slidesports in a similar car, and was able to finish eighth overall, with a single podium being her best result.

=== British GT ===
For 2012, Wenham signed for the Century Motorsport team to compete in the British GT Championship, partnering Dominic Evans in a GT4-class Ginetta G50. She finished in fourth in her first race, and on the podium in her second race, being partnered by Ginetta's Mike Simpson, as Evans had encountered licensing issues. The season would prove to be a successful one; although a victory eluded the pairing of Evans and Wenham, she was still competing for the title with two races to go (with Evans competing for the runner-up spot, having entered two less races). Following that event, however, Wenham had to settle for second place, the title being won by Team WFR (and their driver pairing of Jody Fannin and Warren Hughes), with Wenham stating that her debut season had "been absolutely amazing".

In 2013, following Wenham's reception of the BWRDC Elite GoldStar award, it was announced that she would remain in the series for Century Motorsport, but that she would now be partnered by Declan Jones, as the team looked to take the GT4 title. The first round of the season saw both drivers take their first ever victories, with Jones becoming one of the youngest ever winners in the series. Soon after the event, and following some controversial comments by former-Formula 1 driver Stirling Moss, The Guardian interviewed Wenham about Moss' comments, which she strongly refuted. The following round at Rockingham saw the duo of Jones and Wenham finishing second. This was followed by an unsuccessful round at Silverstone, suffering from mechanical maladies all weekend, and eventually finishing 34th overall. Snetterton saw her and Jones finish third in race one, and fifth in race two. At Brands Hatch, she finished the race, but finished 22nd and last overall. She was unable to compete in the Zandvoort round due to "extenuating circumstances", and switched to Blendini/Triple-R for the season finale, partnered Rory Bryant. She finished the season classified fifth in the GT4 driver's standings, with 130.5 points. In November, she was selected as the UK's only representative for the Volkswagen Scirocco R-Cup selection shootout. However, she was unsuccessful, and the scholarship was awarded to Lucile Cypriano.

== Personal life ==
Wenham is a former pupil of Prince Henry's High School in Evesham, Worcestershire, with her interests outside of motorsport including netball and swimming. Her brother, Guy, also competes for Century Motorsports, in the SAXMAX championship. She has stated that her idols are Sebastian Vettel and Jessica Ennis.
