= Jody Fannin =

British auto racing driver

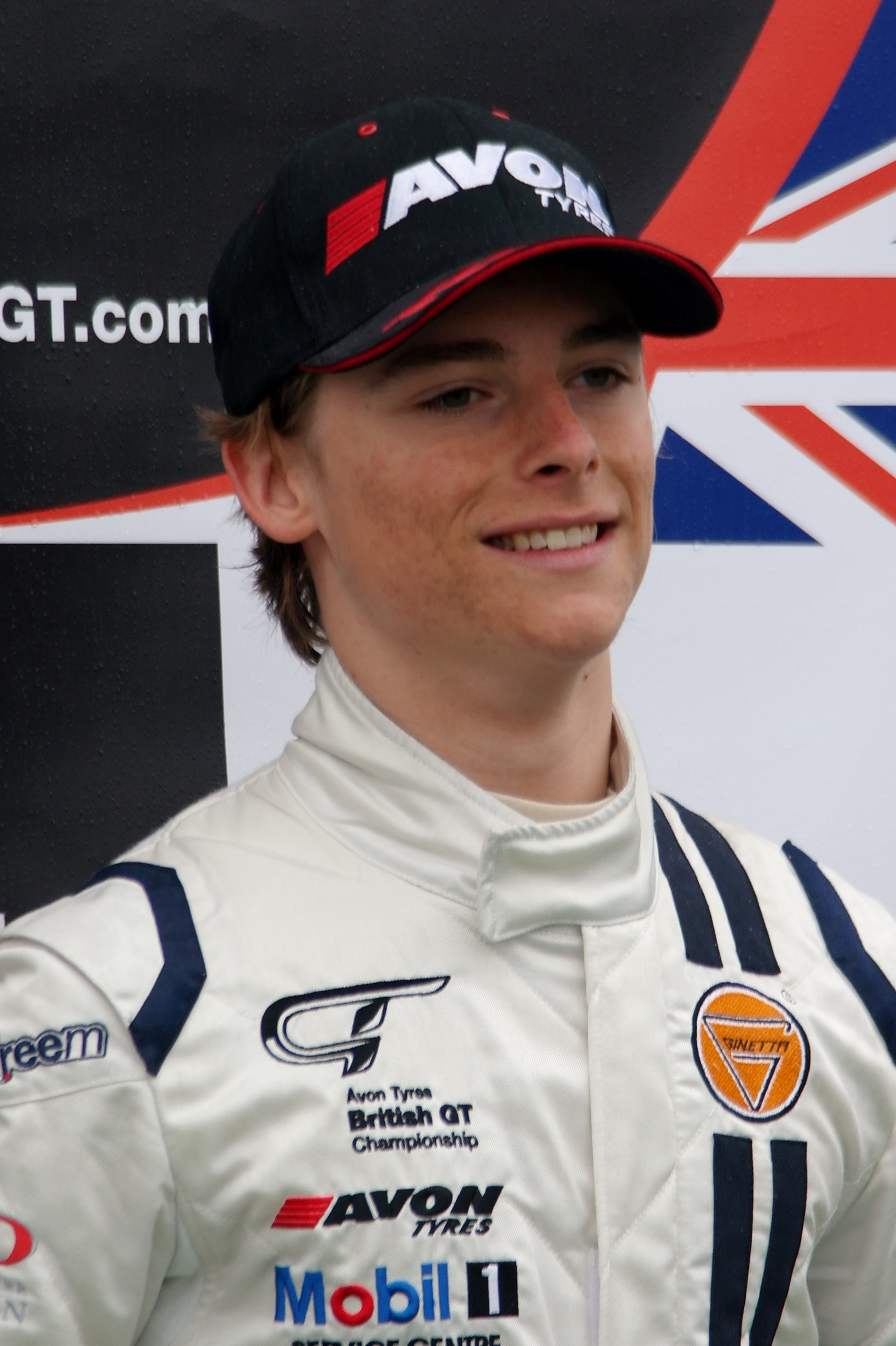
- Jody Fannin at the Oulton Park round of the 2012 British GT Championship season, on the podium.
- Nationality: British
- Born: Jody Luca Umtwaan Fannin; 4 September 1993 (age 33) Chertsey, Surrey, England

European Le Mans Series career
- Debut season: 2017
- Current team: JMW Motorsport
- Categorisation: FIA Silver (until 2019); FIA Gold (2020–)
- Car number: 66
- Starts: 13
- Wins: 1
- Podiums: 5
- Poles: 0
- Fastest laps: 0
- Best finish: 1st (LMGTE) in 2017

Previous series
- VLN; China GT; British GT; International GT Open; GT Tour; ADAC GT Masters; Blancpain Endurance Series; Britcar; Ginetta G50 Cup; Ginetta Junior Championship; MSA Kartmasters Grand Prix; Super One Minimax; BRDC Stars of Tomorrow; London Cup Rotax Mini Max; Midland Championships Minimax; Stars of Tomorrow National Championship

Championship titles
- 2017 2012 2009: European Le Mans Series – GTE; British GT – GT4; Midland Championships – Minimax

Awards
- BRDC Member; Aston Martin Racing Young Driver Academy; BRDC Rising Star; Finalist in the RSF (Racing Steps Foundation)/MSA Young Driver of the Year; Finalist in the Porsche Carrera Cup GB Scholarship; ESSN Media Young Sports Personality of the Year; MSA Academy Member

Jody Luca Umtwaan Fannin (born 4 September 1993) is a British auto racing driver. He competed in the European Le Mans Series in 2017, winning the LMGTE championship with Rob Smith driving for JMW Motorsport in a Ferrari 488 GTE. He was the 2012 British GT GT4 champion, along with Warren Hughes, driving for Team WFR in a Ginetta G50.

== Racing career ==
=== Early career ===
Born in Chertsey, Surrey, Fannin first appeared in karting in 2006, competing in the Bayford Kart Club Summer Sprint Championship Minimax, and finishing sixth, moving to the Stars of Tomorrow National Championship in 2007, to compete in the Rotax Mini Max class, finishing 32nd after competing in two rounds. 2008 would prove to be more successful: he won both Bayford Meadows Winter Championship and the Midland Championships Minimax, finished fifth in the London Cup Rotax Mini Max's Rotax Mini Max class, and finished tenth in the BRDC Stars of Tomorrow MiniMax championship. He also finished ninth in the Super One Minimax in 2009, in addition to a 19th-place finish in the Mini Max class of the MSA Kartmasters Grand Prix. For 2010, he moved into car racing, joining the Ginetta Junior Championship with TJ Motorsport, where he immediately proved his pace: he set fastest lap at round 1 at Thruxton, then went on to win the third round of the season at the Brands Hatch GP circuit, eventually finishing fourth overall, and was the top rookie in the series by a large margin. Following that successful debut season, he moved into the Ginetta G50 Cup, driving for Team PYRO, and finishing third overall.

=== 2012–2013 ===
For 2012, Fannin made the move to the British GT series, driving a GT4-class Ginetta G50, but now for Team WFR, partnering the much more experienced Warren Hughes. The partnership was successful right from the start, as the duo won the first two events of the season, both held at Oulton Park. Fannin and Hughes went into the penultimate round of the season, held at Silverstone, only needing a fourth-place finish to take the title, and his win in that race sealed the title, even though he had only completed six laps of the track prior to the event. Fannin and Hughes would finish on 243.5 points, 84.5 points ahead of Zoë Wenham in second place, having won eight of the ten races that season. Following his championship victory, he entered the final three rounds of the Dutch GT Championship, still driving for Team WFR in the G50, held at Circuit Zandvoort. It proved to be a successful venture, with a fourth-place finish in the first sprint race, fourteenth (and last) in the second sprint race after a mechanical failure, and a second place in the third, and final, race of the weekend. He also entered the final round of the Blancpain Endurance Series, held at the Spanish Circuito de Navarra, driving a Ferrari 458 Italia GT3 entered by Scuderia Vittoria. It would not be a successful debut, as the team, with Fannin partnered for the race by David McDonald and Danny Candia, failing to finish, and retiring after 35 laps.

In 2013, following his BRDC Rising Star award, Fannin made the step up to the GT3 class of the series, now driving for JRM Racing in their Nissan GT-R, signing in a last-minute deal to compete in the opening round of the season, driving solo, which incurred an additional 20-second pit stop penalty. He finished twelfth in race one, and eleventh in race two, both positions being outside of the points. In June, it was announced that he would race for JMB Racing in a Nissan GT-R GT3 at Paul Ricard and the Nürburgring in the Blancpain Endurance Series, driving alongside Nicolas Misslin and Nicolas Marroc. It would not prove to be a successful debut, however, as the trio retired after 22 laps, and were not classified. He returned to JRM Racing again for the 24 Hours of Spa, this time alongside Charles Bateman, Matt Bell and Humaid Al-Masaood, but brake issues dogged their race, and they were eventually forced to retire with a driveline problem, as the car stopped on track. Following this event, he competed in the Magny-Cours round of the GT Tour with Julien Briché, driving for JMB Racing. They retired from the first race, before finishing eleventh in the second. Fannin then partnered Steven Kane for JRM Racing in the Hockenheimring round of the ADAC GT Masters series, taking 18th in the first race, and 14th in the second. Fannin finished the season partnering Jean-Philippe Dayraut in the Paul Ricard round of the GT Tour, and, after narrowly missing out on pole, he was not classified in the first race after contact in the first corner, they took fourth in the second race. This result saw Fannin classified 23rd in the driver's championship.

=== 2014–2016 ===
In 2014, Fannin made a few one off appearances including a points finish in the Silverstone round of the Blancpain Endurance Series driving a Bentley Continental GT3 with James Appleby and Steve Tandy. He followed this up with a win and a second place in the Silverstone round of the International GT Open alongside Darren Turner in a TF Sport Aston Martin V12 Vantage GT3. After being selected for the Aston Martin Racing Young Driver Academy, he joined TF Sport for a full season of British GT in 2015 alongside Andrew Jarman in an Aston Martin V12 Vantage GT3. They achieved two podiums and a pole position, finishing seventh in the championship. Fannin joined Pete Littler for a part season of British GT in 2016, again in an Aston Martin V12 Vantage GT3 and rounded off the year with a podium alongside Francesco Sini in the Barcelona round of the International GT Open with Italian Aston Martin Racing team, Solaris Motorsport.

=== 2017 ===
Fannin was selected as a full member of the BRDC, and he joined JMW Racing for a full season of the European Le Mans Series, starting the season in the team's venerable Ferrari 458 Italia GTE, alongside Rob Smith and Rory Butcher. He achieved a win in the seven year old car's final appearance at Monza against the newer spec 2017 GTE cars, joined by Jonny Cocker who replaced Butcher for the round. The team would switch to a new Ferrari 488 GTE from the A1 Ring round. After a string of podiums, Fannin along with Rob Smith were crowned European Le Mans Series GTE Champions in a chaotic race at Portimao, in Portugal, where a second place was enough to secure the title.

=== 2018 - 2019 ===
In 2018, Fannin got his permit for racing on the Nurburgring Nordschleife. He debuted in the GT3 class at the end of 2018 in a Walkenhorst Motorsport BMW M6 GT3 with a Pro Am podium. 2019 started with a round of the Chinese GT Championship alongside Betty Chen in a Team AAI BMW M6 GT3, resulting in a seventh and fourth place at Sepang. He followed this up with a Pro Am GT3 (SP9) win in the opening round of the VLN series at the Nurburgring Nordschleife. After another round of the China GT Series at Ningbo, Fannin was promoted to the "Pro" Walkenhorst entry for the rest of the VLN series resulting in a successful season with four overall podiums alongside Christian Krognes and David Pittard.

=== 2020 - 2021 ===
During the COVID-19 pandemic of 2020, Fannin did a one off race at the Paul Ricard round of the European Le Mans series, resulting in a fourth place for JMW Motorsport in their Ferrari 488 GTE. He rejoined the team for the full European Le Mans Series in 2022 alongside Rodrigo Sales and Andrea Fontana which resulted in a sixth place finish in the GTE championship. 2021 also marked Fannin's long awaited debut in the 24 hours of Le Mans alongside Rodrigo Sales and Thomas Neubauer. After a strong test day where he put the car third in GTE Pro Am in a field of 23 on debut at the circuit, set up changes for qualifying didn't give the expected results and they would line up in 22nd for the race. With rain falling before the start of the race, and as start driver, Fannin would do his first wet laps of the Circuit de la Sarthe in race conditions. After a double stint, then getting back in the car for a night time double stint, the car was up to fifth from 22nd on the grid, when a team mate had a coming together with an LMP2 car at the Dunlop chicane, resulting in retirement just after 1am.

=== 2022 - 2023 ===
Fannin joined up with Racing One and their Ferrari 488 GT3 for a return to the Nordschleife and VLN. After a difficult 12 hour where the car was plagued with a brake issue, he returned to share the car with Christian Kohlhaas in the Pro-Am class where he finished on the podium after qualifying in sixth overall. He returned to debut Racing One's new Ferrari 296 GT3 after a pre season test programme at the beginning of 2023.

== Personal life ==
Fannin was named after Jody Scheckter, and has a South African father, and an English mother. His family moved to South Africa when he was one, moving back to the UK seven years later. Away from motorsport, he is a driver coach (ARDS instructor) and race engineer through his Number 27 Driver Development company.

== Racing record ==
=== Complete European Le Mans Series results ===
(key) (Races in bold indicate pole position; results in italics indicate fastest lap)

Year	Entrant	Class	Chassis	Engine	1	2	3	4	5	6	Rank	Points
2017	JMW Motorsport	LMGTE	Ferrari 458 Italia GT2	Ferrari 4.5 L V8	SIL; 5	MNZ; 1					1st	104
2017	JMW Motorsport	LMGTE	Ferrari 488 GTE	Ferrari F154CB 3.9 L Turbo V8			RBR; 2	LEC; 3	SPA; 2	ALG; 2	1st	104
2020	JMW Motorsport	LMGTE	Ferrari 488 GTE Evo	Ferrari F154CB 3.9 L Turbo V8	LEC; 4	SPA	LEC	MNZ	ALG		15th	12
2021	JMW Motorsport	LMGTE	Ferrari 488 GTE Evo	Ferrari F154CB 3.9 L Turbo V8	CAT; 7	RBR; 5	LEC; 6	MNZ; 4	SPA; 6	ALG; 6	8th	52

=== Complete 24 Hours of Le Mans results ===
Year	Team	Co-Drivers	Car	Class	Laps	Pos.	Class Pos.
2021	(United Kingdom) JMW Motorsport	(France) Thomas Neubauer (United States) Rodrigo Sales	Ferrari 488 GTE Evo	GTE; Am	117	DNF	DNF
