= Ginetta G55 =

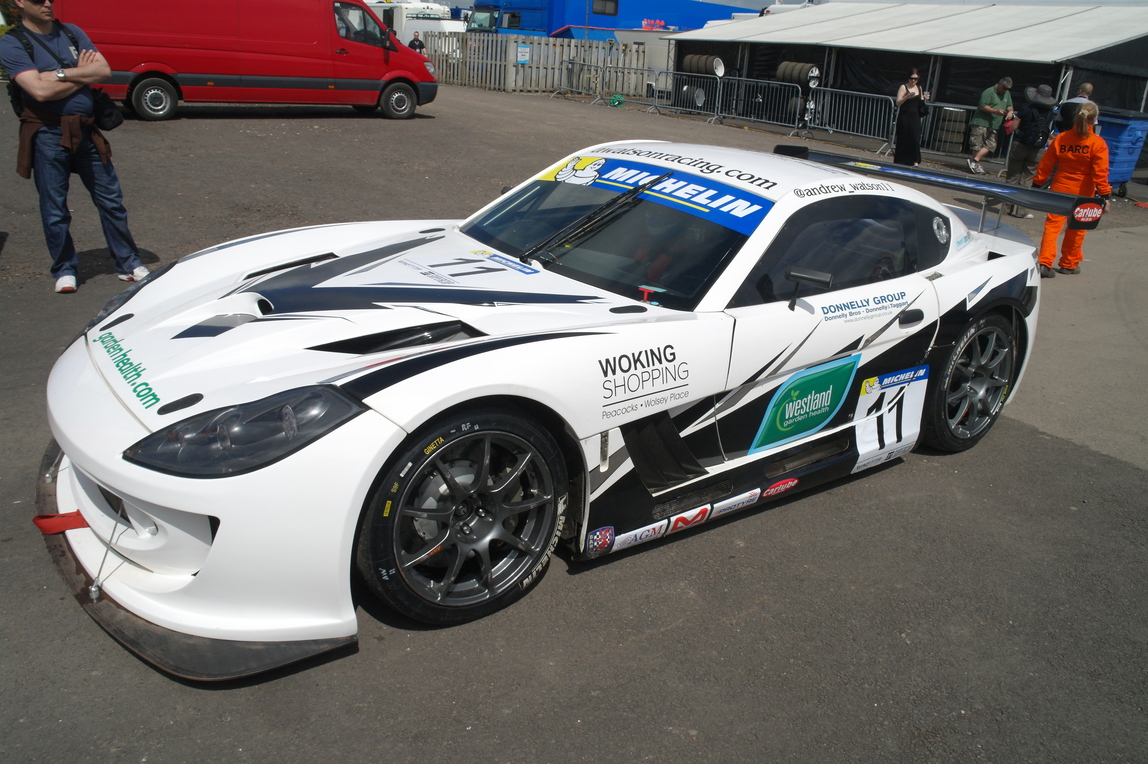
- Andrew Watson's Ginetta G55 at Thruxton in May 2013

Overview
- Manufacturer: Ginetta Cars
- Also called: Ginetta GT3
- Production: 2011 – present
- Assembly: Leeds, West Yorkshire, England

Body and chassis
- Class: Sports car
- Body style: 2-door coupé
- Layout: Front-engine, RWD

Powertrain
- Engine: Ford 3.7 litre V6 (Cup); Ginetta Racing 4.35 litre V8 (GT3)
- Transmission: Hewland 6-speed sequential manual

Dimensions
- Kerb weight: 950 kg (2,094 lb) (Cup); 1,100 kg (2,425 lb) (GT3)

Chronology
- Predecessor: Ginetta G50
- Successor: Ginetta G56

The Ginetta G55 is a specialist sports car, which has been built by Ginetta Cars since 2011. It is built to the FIA GT3 regulations, and the cars are raced in a one-make series; the Ginetta GT Supercup. In addition to this, they are also used in the GT3 class of competitions such as the British GT Championship. It was an evolutionary update of the Ginetta G50, which is a GT4-class car.

== Cup ==
Ginetta Cars announced in November 2010 that they were going to be building a new sports car, and named it as the G55. In February 2011, the car was released, as a more powerful evolution of the G50. The G55 featured a Ford-sourced 3.7 litre V6, producing 370 hp, in addition to a 6-speed sequential manual gearbox, built by Hewland. The new car did not replace the G50; instead, it supplemented it, and the Ginetta G50 Cup was rebranded as the Ginetta GT Supercup. The G55 was available for sale for £75,000, or as an upgrade from the G50 for £25,000. The car made its British GT debut in the Oulton Park rounds of the 2011 season, with four separate entries competing; the best result of the event came courtesy of Century Motorsport, whom took a ninth-place finish at the second race of the day. Century Motorsport were also responsible for the car's best finish of the season; a fourth place at Rockingham Motor Speedway, in the first race of the day. A GT3 test mule was run by Rollcentre Racing (using the Cup engine with some GT3-specification components) in the 2011 Britcar 24 Hours; however, the car failed to finish the race.

== GT3 ==
In 2012, Ginetta introduced a full GT3 version of the G55, which featured a Ginetta Racing-built 4.35 litre V8 engine in place of the Cup's 3.7 litre V6. Previously, they had used the Cup-spec car in GT3 races. Like the Cup car, it used a Hewland-sourced gearbox; however, it features wider wheels than the Cup car.

The G55 GT3 made its first appearance at a Donington Park test session. The GT3 car made its competitive debut at the Silverstone round of the Britcar GT series, with Optimum Motorsport entering it; they finished eighth overall, and third in Class 1. The car's first win came at the Donington Park round of the Britcar series; with Team LNT and Optimum Motorsport taking a G55 one-two. A G55 GT3 was used by United Autosports for the 2012 Britcar 24 Hours, with the team entering Richard Dean, Lawrence Tomlinson, Mike Simpson and Tom Kimber-Smith as their drivers. The team contested under the Team LNT banner, and finished 21st overall, and third in Class 1.

The G55 GT3 was announced as one of the official cars for Project CARS simulator in August 2012, alongside the G50 and the Ginetta G40 Junior.

Ginetta showcased both models of the G55 at the 2013 Autosport International Show. For the 2013 British GT season, IDL Racing announced they would be entering a G55 GT3 in the series (in conjunction with CWS), whilst two Works-run cars were also entered.

== GT4 ==
The Ginetta G55 is also running in the 2020 ADAC GT4 championship: with a naturally aspirated 3.7L engine, delivering 380 PS and weight of 1085 kg.

== G55 GTA ==
The Ginetta G55 GTA is being sold in North America as part of a campaign to interest people in American sports-car racing. This model is also suitable for people who want a track day car for weekend time trials and high-performance driving education events. The car is powered by a 270 bhp (201 kW), 3.7-litre V6 Ford engine with a dry sump and race clutch, driving the rear wheels via a paddle-shifted 6-speed Quaife helical gearbox with auto-blip. The G55 GTA weighs 2,400 pounds (1,100 kg) and has a top speed of 140 mph (225 km/h).
