= Ginetta G50 =

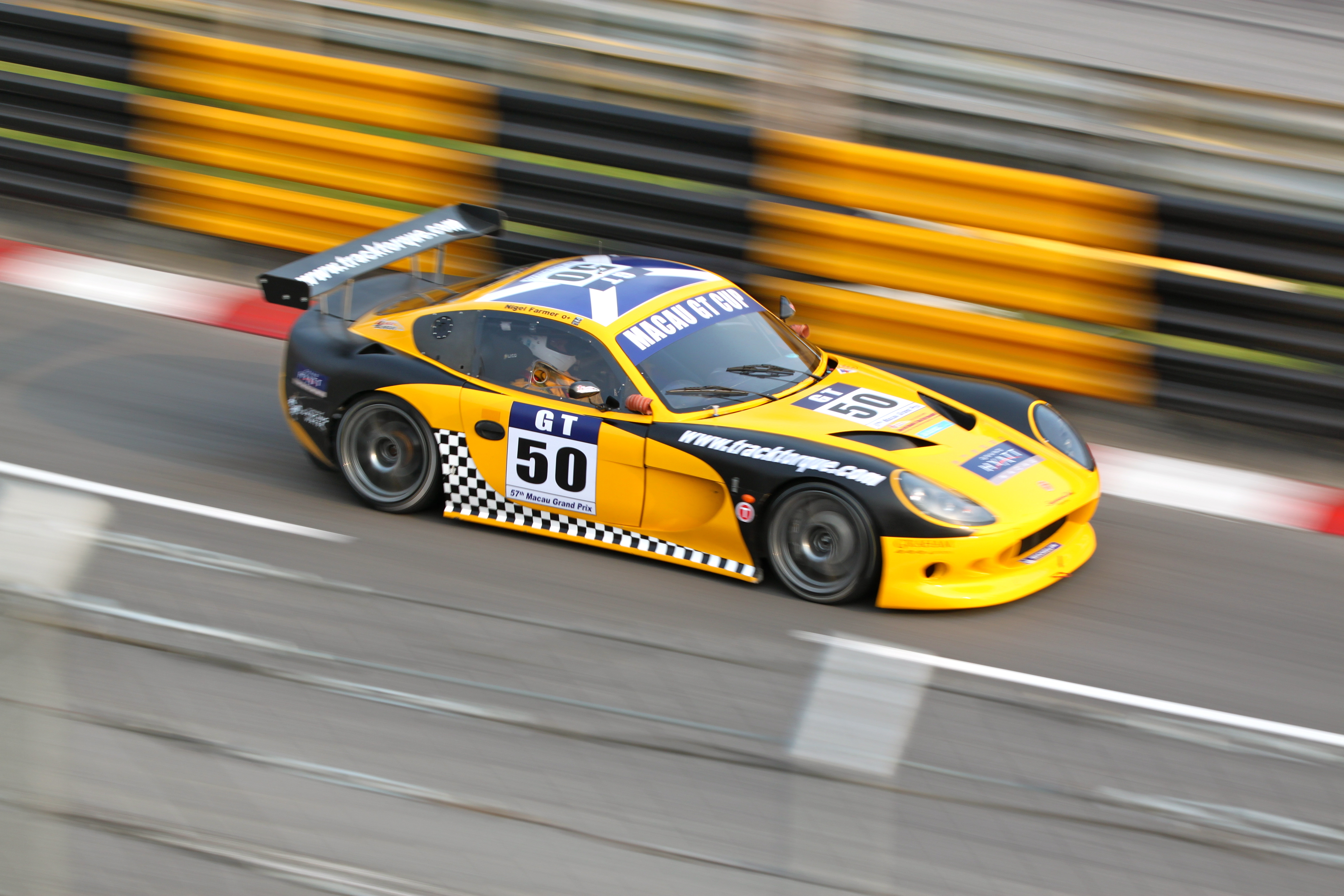
- Ginetta G50 GT4 competing at the 2010 Macau Grand Prix.

Overview
- Manufacturer: Ginetta Cars
- Production: 2008–2014
- Assembly: Leeds, West Yorkshire, England
- Designer: Lawrence Tomlinson

Body and chassis
- Class: Sports car (S)
- Body style: 2-door coupé
- Layout: Front-engine, rear wheel drive
- Related: Ginetta G50 EV; Ginetta G50Z

Powertrain
- Engine: G50: 3.5 L Ford Duratec V6; G50 GT4: 3.7 L Ford Duratec V6; G50Z: 3.4 L Zytek ZG348 V8
- Power output: G50: 300–340 hp (224–254 kW; 304–345 PS); G50 GT4: 355 hp (265 kW; 360 PS); G50Z: 490 hp (365 kW; 497 PS)
- Transmission: 6-speed Hewland sequential manual 6-speed Quaife E60G sequential manual

Dimensions
- Length: 4,104.6 mm (161.6 in)
- Width: 1,889.8 mm (74.4 in)
- Height: 1,132.8 mm (44.6 in)
- Kerb weight: 945 kg (2,083 lb); 1,100 kg (2,425 lb) (G50Z)

Chronology
- Predecessor: Ginetta G20 (Race and Road versions)
- Successor: Ginetta G55 (Race version); Ginetta G60/G40 (Road version)

The Ginetta G50 is a specialist GT4 class-developed racing car, designed by Ginetta Cars. A road version of the car was planned, but did not enter wide-scale production; instead, the smaller Ginetta G40 was launched.

== Development ==
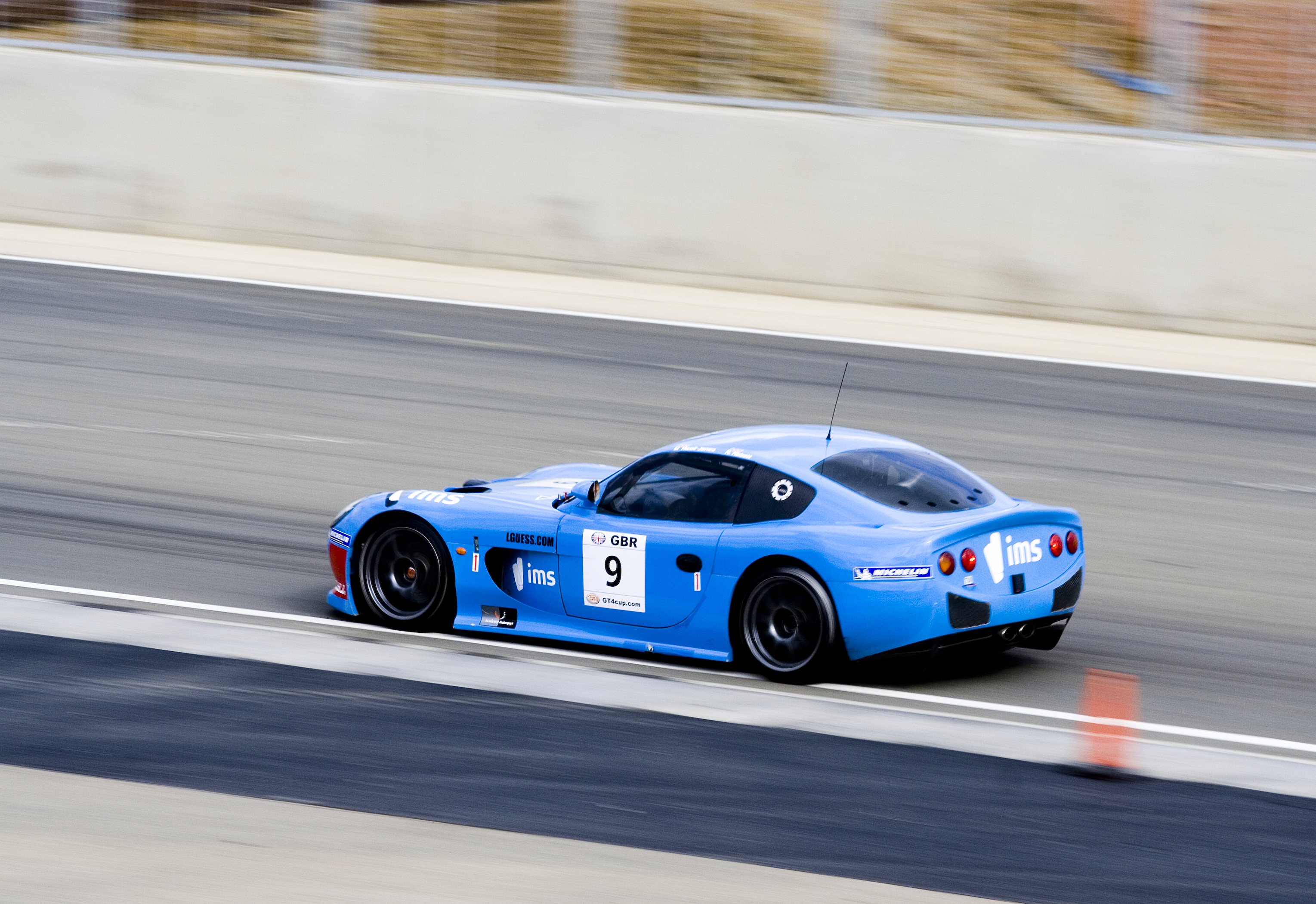
Ginetta G50

In late 2007, in what he later described as his Victor Kiam moment, Leeds-based businessman Lawrence Tomlinson bought Ginetta Cars from the group of enthusiasts, who themselves had bought it out of administration.

The G50 was developed to celebrate 50 year of production of Ginetta Cars. With base specifications penned by trained engineer Tomlinson, the car was developed in under six months.

== Racing ==
Launched in 2008, the G50 was awarded Autosport National Car of the Year in its first year. With its own Ginetta GT Supercup one-make series, the G50 has also been undefeated GT4 class championship winner record holder in the British GT Championship (5), and won the GT4 European Cup in 2009, beating Aston Martin, BMW and Porsche.

As a result, Ginetta Cars won "Small Business of the Year" from the Motorsport Industry Association in 2008, and in 2009 Tomlinson was nominated by the MIA for the "Outstanding Contribution to Motorsport" award.

== Road car ==
The first Ginetta G50 road-registered car was shown in April 2008, and then took part in the Silverstone Supercar Tour. It features the same base set-up as the race car, with a proposed development of a V8 model with 520 bhp (390 kW; 530 PS). Retail prices were estimated at starting from £45,000 ($72,549) for the V6, and £100,000 ($161,220) for the V8. Due to economic problems, however, Ginetta indefinitely shelved plans for general production of the G50, instead opting to produce the smaller, cheaper Ginetta G40.

== G50 EV Prototype ==
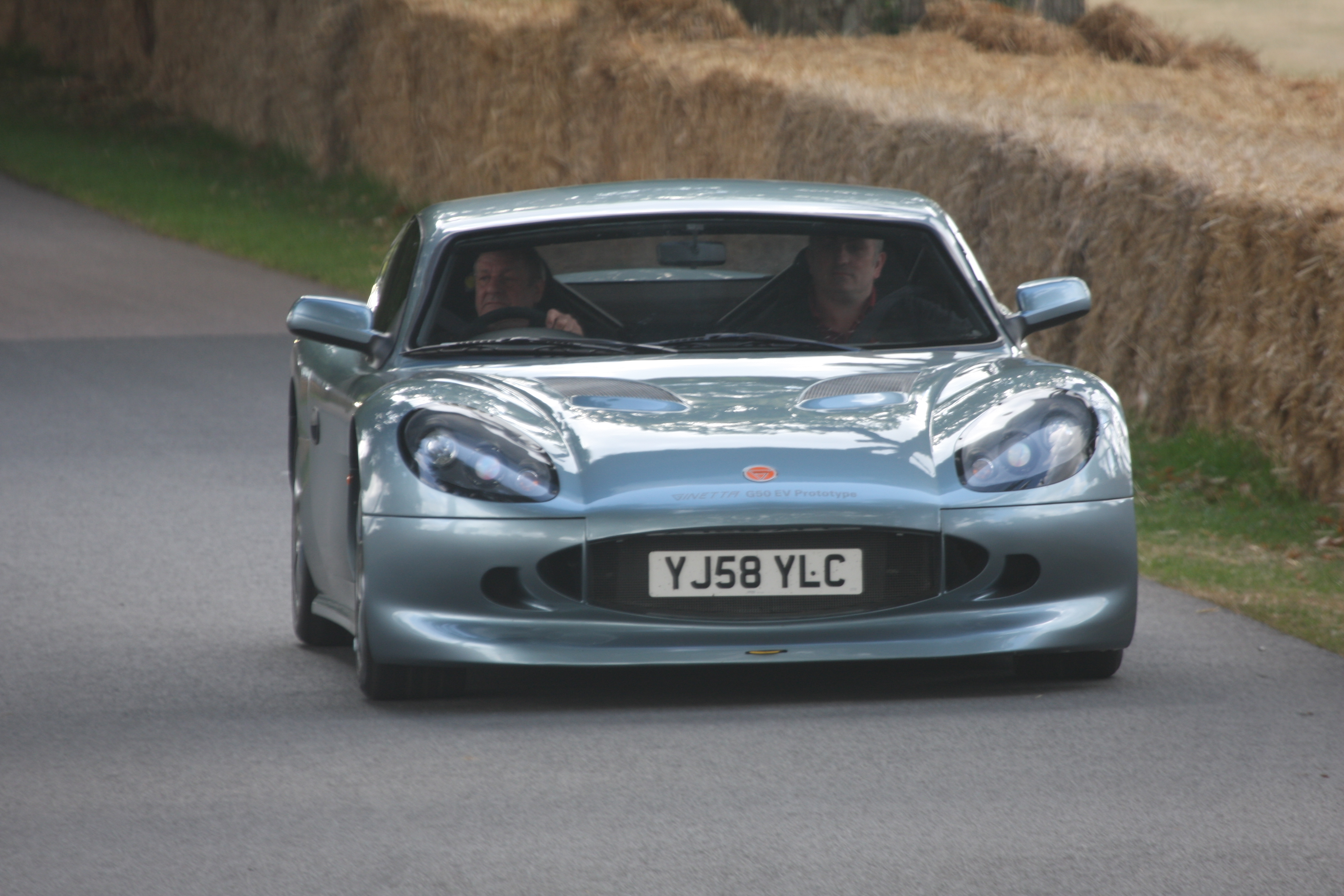
Ginetta G50 EV at Goodwood in 2009

In 2009, Ginetta, in conjunction with Zytek, built an electric version of the G50 named the Ginetta G50 EV Prototype. The car was fitted with a rear-mounted 90 kW (122 PS; 121 hp) electric motor, with the regular petrol engine being removed. Ginetta gave an estimated range of between 150 and 250 miles (240 and 400 km). In November, former Formula 1 World Champion John Surtees drove the prototype through the Channel Tunnel, with the car becoming the first production-specification car to be driven through the tunnel. The production was later cancelled following the company's failure to secure a government grant for the project.

== G50Z ==
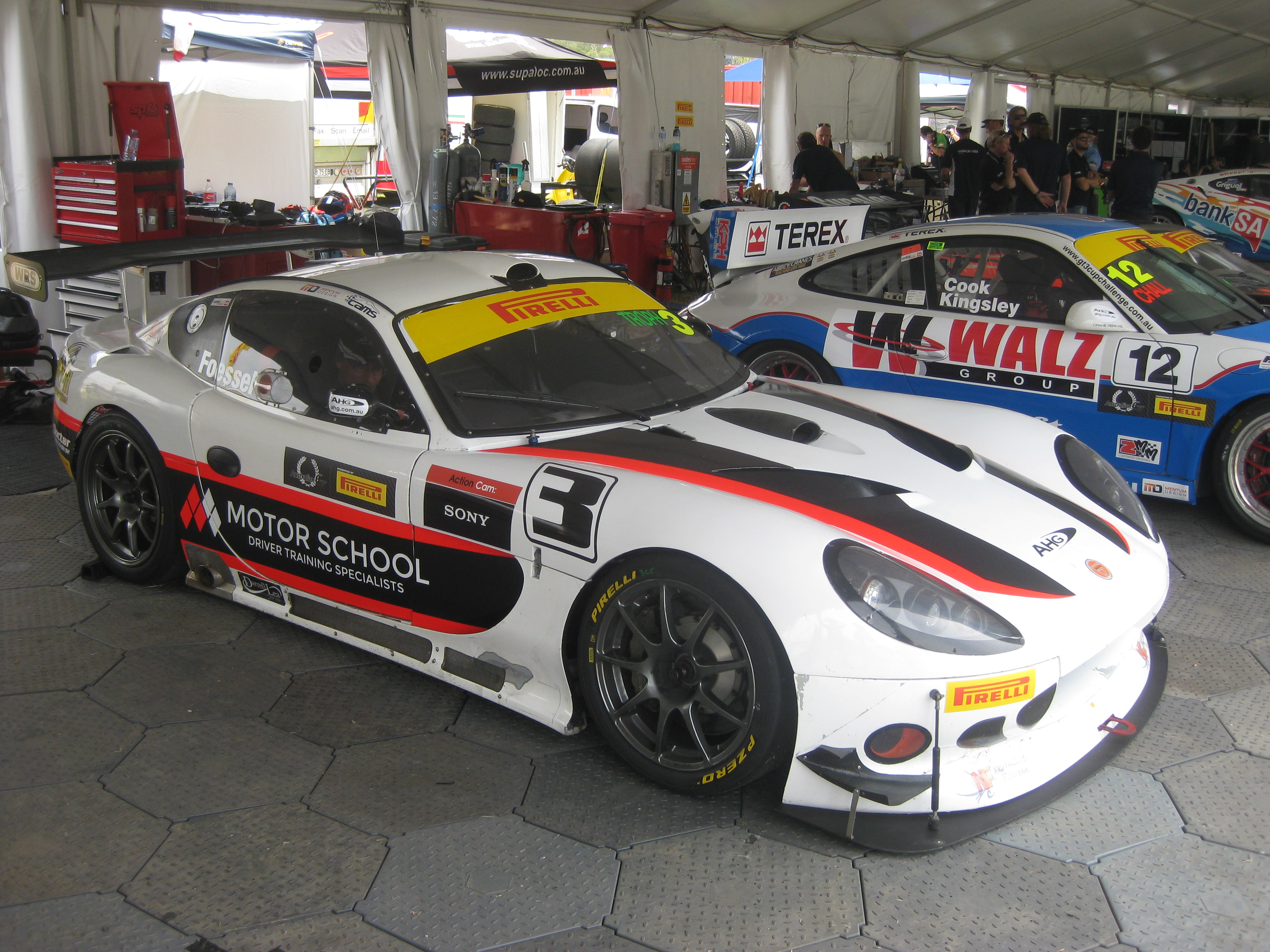
Ginetta G50Z

In 2009, the Ginetta G50Z was released. Intended for GT3 class racing, the car featured a 4.0-litre Zytek V8 engine which was then down graded to 3.8-litres before the car was sold to privateer teams due to the mechanical problems. The engine produced 365 kW (496 PS; 489 hp) in the highest trim. The car focused on improved handling and stability, a front splitter and a large rear diffuser aided in that purpose along with a large rear wing. The engine was coupled to a 6-speed Hewland sequential manual gearbox operated by paddles on the steering column which resulted in faster gear changes than the GT4.
