= 2015 British GT Championship =

Sports car racing season

Seasons
- ← 2014 2016 →

The 2015 Avon Tyres British GT season was the 23rd season of the British GT Championship. The season began on 6 April at Oulton Park and finished on 13 September at Donington Park, after nine rounds held over seven meetings. Beechdean Motorsport won both the GT3 and GT4 drivers championships. Team owner Andrew Howard won his second title with Jonathan Adam in GT3 while Jamie Chadwick and Ross Gunn claimed honours in GT4.

== Entry list ==
2015 Entry List
Team	No.	Drivers	Class		Chassis	Engine	Rounds
Team	No.	Drivers	Driver	Car	Chassis	Engine	Rounds
(United Kingdom) Beechdean-AMR	007	(United Kingdom) Jonathan Adam	PA	GT3	Aston Martin V12 Vantage GT3	Aston Martin 6.0L V12	All
(United Kingdom) Beechdean-AMR	007	(United Kingdom) Andrew Howard	PA	GT3	Aston Martin V12 Vantage GT3	Aston Martin 6.0L V12	All
(United Kingdom) Beechdean-AMR	407	(United Kingdom) Jamie Chadwick	S	GT4	Aston Martin V8 Vantage GT4	Aston Martin 4.7L V8	All
(United Kingdom) Beechdean-AMR	407	(United Kingdom) Ross Gunn	S	GT4	Aston Martin V8 Vantage GT4	Aston Martin 4.7L V8	All
(United Kingdom) Ecurie Ecosse powered by Black Bull	1	(United Kingdom) Marco Attard	PA	GT3	BMW Z4 GT3	BMW 4.4L V8	All
(United Kingdom) Ecurie Ecosse powered by Black Bull	1	(United Kingdom) Alexander Sims	PA	GT3	BMW Z4 GT3	BMW 4.4L V8	All
Oman Racing Team	2	(Oman) Ahmad Al Harthy	S	GT3	Aston Martin V12 Vantage GT3	Aston Martin 6.0L V12	All
Oman Racing Team	2	(United Kingdom) Daniel Lloyd	S	GT3	Aston Martin V12 Vantage GT3	Aston Martin 6.0L V12	1–6
Oman Racing Team	2	(United Kingdom) Alex MacDowall	S	GT3	Aston Martin V12 Vantage GT3	Aston Martin 6.0L V12	7–9
Oman Racing Team	4	(United Kingdom) Mat Jackson	PA	GT3	Aston Martin V12 Vantage GT3	Aston Martin 6.0L V12	1–2
Oman Racing Team	4	(United Kingdom) Phil Dryburgh	PA	GT3	Aston Martin V12 Vantage GT3	Aston Martin 6.0L V12	1–2
Oman Racing Team	6	(United Kingdom) Rory Butcher	PA	GT3	Aston Martin V12 Vantage GT3	Aston Martin 6.0L V12	All
Oman Racing Team	6	(United Kingdom) Liam Griffin	PA	GT3	Aston Martin V12 Vantage GT3	Aston Martin 6.0L V12	All
(Australia) Von Ryan Racing	10	(United Kingdom) Ross Wylie	S	GT3	McLaren 650S GT3	McLaren 3.8L Turbo V8	All
(Australia) Von Ryan Racing	10	(United Kingdom) Andrew Watson	S	GT3	McLaren 650S GT3	McLaren 3.8L Turbo V8	All
(Australia) Von Ryan Racing	12	(United Kingdom) Euan Hankey	PA	GT3	McLaren 650S GT3	McLaren 3.8L Turbo V8	1–3, 7–9
(Australia) Von Ryan Racing	12	(Turkey) Salih Yoluç	PA	GT3	McLaren 650S GT3	McLaren 3.8L Turbo V8	1–3, 7–9
(Australia) Von Ryan Racing	12	(United Kingdom) Adrian Quaife-Hobbs	PA	GT3	McLaren 650S GT3	McLaren 3.8L Turbo V8	4
(Australia) Von Ryan Racing	12	(France) Gilles Vannelet	PA	GT3	McLaren 650S GT3	McLaren 3.8L Turbo V8	4
(United Kingdom) 22GT Racing	11	(United Kingdom) Jon Barnes	PA	GT3	Aston Martin V12 Vantage GT3	Aston Martin 6.0L V12	All
(United Kingdom) 22GT Racing	11	(United Kingdom) Mark Farmer	PA	GT3	Aston Martin V12 Vantage GT3	Aston Martin 6.0L V12	All
(United Kingdom) TF Sport	17	(United Kingdom) Matt Bell	PA	GT3	Aston Martin V12 Vantage GT3	Aston Martin 6.0L V12	All
(United Kingdom) TF Sport	17	(United Kingdom) Derek Johnston	PA	GT3	Aston Martin V12 Vantage GT3	Aston Martin 6.0L V12	All
(United Kingdom) TF Sport	27	(United Kingdom) Jody Fannin	PA	GT3	Aston Martin V12 Vantage GT3	Aston Martin 6.0L V12	All
(United Kingdom) TF Sport	27	(United Kingdom) Andrew Jarman	PA	GT3	Aston Martin V12 Vantage GT3	Aston Martin 6.0L V12	All
(United Kingdom) FF Corse	18	(United Kingdom) Gary Eastwood	PA	GT3	Ferrari 458 Italia GT3	Ferrari 4.5L V8	1–8
(United Kingdom) FF Corse	18	(United Kingdom) Adam Carroll	PA	GT3	Ferrari 458 Italia GT3	Ferrari 4.5L V8	1–3, 6–8
(United Kingdom) FF Corse	18	(United Kingdom) Richard Lyons	PA	GT3	Ferrari 458 Italia GT3	Ferrari 4.5L V8	4
(United Kingdom) FF Corse	18	(United Kingdom) Ollie Hancock	PA	GT3	Ferrari 458 Italia GT3	Ferrari 4.5L V8	5
(United Kingdom) Rosso Verde	21	(United Kingdom) Hector Lester	PA	GT3	Ferrari 458 Italia GT3	Ferrari 4.5L V8	1–2, 5–6, 9
(United Kingdom) Rosso Verde	21	(Denmark) Benny Simonsen	PA	GT3	Ferrari 458 Italia GT3	Ferrari 4.5L V8	1–2, 5–6, 9
(United Kingdom) Preci-Spark	22	(United Kingdom) David Jones	AA	GT3	Mercedes-Benz SLS AMG GT3	Mercedes-AMG 6.2L V8	All
(United Kingdom) Preci-Spark	22	(United Kingdom) Godfrey Jones	AA	GT3	Mercedes-Benz SLS AMG GT3	Mercedes-AMG 6.2L V8	All
(United Kingdom) Team Parker Racing	24	(United Kingdom) Callum MacLeod	PA	GT3	Audi R8 LMS Ultra	Audi 5.2L V10	4
(United Kingdom) Team Parker Racing	24	(United Kingdom) Ian Loggie	PA	GT3	Audi R8 LMS Ultra	Audi 5.2L V10	4
(United Kingdom) RAM Racing	30	(United Kingdom) Lewis Plato	PA	GT3	Mercedes-Benz SLS AMG GT3	Mercedes-AMG 6.2L V8	1–8
(United Kingdom) RAM Racing	30	(United Kingdom) Alistair MacKinnon	PA	GT3	Mercedes-Benz SLS AMG GT3	Mercedes-AMG 6.2L V8	1–8
(United Kingdom) RAM Racing	30	(United Kingdom) Lewis Plato	S	GT3	Mercedes-Benz SLS AMG GT3	Mercedes-AMG 6.2L V8	9
(United Kingdom) RAM Racing	30	(United Kingdom) Bradley Ellis	S	GT3	Mercedes-Benz SLS AMG GT3	Mercedes-AMG 6.2L V8	9
(United Kingdom) Trackspeed	31	(Austria) Norbert Siedler	PA	GT3	Porsche 997 GT3-R	Porsche 4.0L Flat-6	4
(United Kingdom) Trackspeed	31	(United Kingdom) David Ashburn	PA	GT3	Porsche 997 GT3-R	Porsche 4.0L Flat-6	4
(United Kingdom) Team LNT	32	(United Kingdom) Mike Simpson	PA	GT3	Ginetta G55 GT3	Ginetta 4.3L V8	All
(United Kingdom) Team LNT	32	(United Kingdom) Steve Tandy	PA	GT3	Ginetta G55 GT3	Ginetta 4.3L V8	All
(United Kingdom) Team LNT	44	(United Kingdom) Rick Parfitt Jr.	PA	GT3	Ginetta G55 GT3	Ginetta 4.3L V8	All
(United Kingdom) Team LNT	44	(United Kingdom) Tom Oliphant	PA	GT3	Ginetta G55 GT3	Ginetta 4.3L V8	1–6, 9
(United Kingdom) Team LNT	44	(United Kingdom) Ryan Ratcliffe	PA	GT3	Ginetta G55 GT3	Ginetta 4.3L V8	7–8
(United Kingdom) University of Bolton	41	(United Kingdom) Rob Garofall	PA	GT4	Ginetta G55 GT4	Ford Cyclone 3.7L V6	3–9
(United Kingdom) University of Bolton	41	(United Kingdom) Anna Walewska	PA	GT4	Ginetta G55 GT4	Ford Cyclone 3.7L V6	3–9
(Belgium) Marc VDS & Friends Racing for Cancer	42	(Belgium) Bas Leinders	PA	GT3	BMW Z4 GT3	BMW 4.4L V8	5
(Belgium) Marc VDS & Friends Racing for Cancer	42	(Belgium) Pascal Witmeur	PA	GT3	BMW Z4 GT3	BMW 4.4L V8	5
(Germany) PROsport Performance	42	(United Kingdom) Adam Christodoulou	PA	Inv	Porsche 981 Cayman SP GT4	Porsche 3.4L Flat-6	9
(Germany) PROsport Performance	42	(France) Henry Hassid	PA	Inv	Porsche 981 Cayman SP GT4	Porsche 3.4L Flat-6	9
(United Kingdom) Century Motorsport	43	(Norway) Aleksander Schjerpen	S	GT4	Ginetta G55 GT4	Ford Cyclone 3.7L V6	1–9
(United Kingdom) Century Motorsport	43	(United Kingdom) James Birch	S	GT4	Ginetta G55 GT4	Ford Cyclone 3.7L V6	1–6
(United Kingdom) Century Motorsport	43	(Sweden) Fredrik Blomstedt	S	GT4	Ginetta G55 GT4	Ford Cyclone 3.7L V6	7–9
(United Kingdom) Century Motorsport	73	(United Kingdom) Nathan Freke	PA	GT4	Ginetta G55 GT4	Ford Cyclone 3.7L V6	9
(United Kingdom) Century Motorsport	73	(United Kingdom) Ian Stinton	PA	GT4	Ginetta G55 GT4	Ford Cyclone 3.7L V6	9
(United Kingdom) Twisted Team Parker	46	(United Kingdom) Bradley Ellis	PA	GT4	Ginetta G55 GT4	Ford Cyclone 3.7L V6	1–6
(United Kingdom) Twisted Team Parker	46	(United Kingdom) Adrian Barwick	PA	GT4	Ginetta G55 GT4	Ford Cyclone 3.7L V6	1–6
(United Kingdom) JWB Motorsport	47	(United Kingdom) Jake Giddings	PA	GT4	Aston Martin V8 Vantage GT4	Aston Martin 4.7L V8	1–9
(United Kingdom) JWB Motorsport	47	(United Kingdom) Kieran Griffin	PA	GT4	Aston Martin V8 Vantage GT4	Aston Martin 4.7L V8	1–9
(United Kingdom) Fox Motorsport	48	(United Kingdom) Jamie Stanley	PA	GT4	Ginetta G55 GT4	Ford Cyclone 3.7L V6	1–6, 9
(United Kingdom) Fox Motorsport	48	(United Kingdom) Paul McNeilly	PA	GT4	Ginetta G55 GT4	Ford Cyclone 3.7L V6	1–6, 9
(United Kingdom) Fox Motorsport	48	(United Kingdom) Jamie Stanley	S	GT4	Ginetta G55 GT4	Ford Cyclone 3.7L V6	7–8
(United Kingdom) Fox Motorsport	48	(Italy) Fulvio Mussi	S	GT4	Ginetta G55 GT4	Ford Cyclone 3.7L V6	7–8
(United Kingdom) AmDtuning.com	49	(United Kingdom) Graham Coomes	PA	GT4	Porsche 997 GT4	Porsche 3.6L Flat-6	1–6, 9
(United Kingdom) AmDtuning.com	49	(United Kingdom) Shaun Hollamby	PA	GT4	Porsche 997 GT4	Porsche 3.6L Flat-6	1–2
(United Kingdom) AmDtuning.com	49	(United Kingdom) Jake Hill	PA	GT4	Porsche 997 GT4	Porsche 3.6L Flat-6	3–6, 9
(United Kingdom) AmDtuning.com	49	(United Kingdom) Graham Coomes	AA	GT4	Porsche 997 GT4	Porsche 3.6L Flat-6	7–8
(United Kingdom) AmDtuning.com	49	(United Kingdom) Shaun Hollamby	AA	GT4	Porsche 997 GT4	Porsche 3.6L Flat-6	7–8
(United Kingdom) Professional Motorsport World Expo racing with Optimum	50	(United Kingdom) Graham Johnson	PA	GT4	Ginetta G55 GT4	Ford Cyclone 3.7L V6	All
(United Kingdom) Professional Motorsport World Expo racing with Optimum	50	(United Kingdom) Mike Robinson	PA	GT4	Ginetta G55 GT4	Ford Cyclone 3.7L V6	All
(United Kingdom) Professional Motorsport World Expo racing with Optimum	55	(United Kingdom) Charlie Hollings	PA	GT4	Ginetta G55 GT4	Ford Cyclone 3.7L V6	4
(United Kingdom) Professional Motorsport World Expo racing with Optimum	55	(United Kingdom) Alistair Barclay	PA	GT4	Ginetta G55 GT4	Ford Cyclone 3.7L V6	4
(United Kingdom) Stratton Motorsport	51	(United Kingdom) Jade Edwards	PA	GT4	Aston Martin V8 Vantage GT4	Aston Martin 4.7L V8	1–3, 7–8
(United Kingdom) Stratton Motorsport	51	(United Kingdom) Chloé Edwards	PA	GT4	Aston Martin V8 Vantage GT4	Aston Martin 4.7L V8	1–2
(United Kingdom) Stratton Motorsport	51	(United Kingdom) George White	PA	GT4	Aston Martin V8 Vantage GT4	Aston Martin 4.7L V8	3
(United Kingdom) Stratton Motorsport	51	(United Kingdom) David Tinn	PA	GT4	Aston Martin V8 Vantage GT4	Aston Martin 4.7L V8	7–8
(United Kingdom) UltraTek Racing	53	(United Kingdom) Richard Taffinder	PA	GT4	Lotus Evora GT4	Toyota 4.0L V6	All
(United Kingdom) UltraTek Racing	53	(United Kingdom) Martin Plowman	PA	GT4	Lotus Evora GT4	Toyota 4.0L V6	1–2
(United Kingdom) UltraTek Racing	53	(United Kingdom) James Nash	PA	GT4	Lotus Evora GT4	Toyota 4.0L V6	3–9
(United Kingdom) UltraTek Racing	54	(United Kingdom) Jamie Wall	PA	GT4	Lotus Evora GT4	Toyota 4.0L V6	All
(United Kingdom) UltraTek Racing	54	(United Kingdom) Tim Eakin	PA	GT4	Lotus Evora GT4	Toyota 4.0L V6	All
(United Kingdom) Tolman Motorsport	56	(United Kingdom) David Pattison	PA	GT4	Ginetta G55 GT4	Ford Cyclone 3.7L V6	All
(United Kingdom) Tolman Motorsport	56	(United Kingdom) Luke Davenport	PA	GT4	Ginetta G55 GT4	Ford Cyclone 3.7L V6	All
(United Kingdom) Academy Motorsport	61	(United Kingdom) Will Moore	PA	GT4	Aston Martin V8 Vantage GT4	Aston Martin 4.7L V8	All
(United Kingdom) Academy Motorsport	61	(Sweden) Dennis Strandberg	PA	GT4	Aston Martin V8 Vantage GT4	Aston Martin 4.7L V8	All
(United Kingdom) Academy Motorsport	62	(United Kingdom) Chris Webster	PA	GT4	Aston Martin V8 Vantage GT4	Aston Martin 4.7L V8	All
(United Kingdom) Academy Motorsport	62	(United Kingdom) James Harrison	PA	GT4	Aston Martin V8 Vantage GT4	Aston Martin 4.7L V8	1–3
(United Kingdom) Academy Motorsport	62	(United Kingdom) Matt Nicoll-Jones	PA	GT4	Aston Martin V8 Vantage GT4	Aston Martin 4.7L V8	4
(United Kingdom) Academy Motorsport	62	(United Kingdom) Mike Hart	PA	GT4	Aston Martin V8 Vantage GT4	Aston Martin 4.7L V8	5–8
(United Kingdom) Academy Motorsport	62	(United Kingdom) Daniel Lloyd	PA	GT4	Aston Martin V8 Vantage GT4	Aston Martin 4.7L V8	9
Team Russia by Barwell Racing with Demon Tweeks	63	(United Kingdom) Phil Keen	PA	GT3	BMW Z4 GT3	BMW 4.4L V8	All
Team Russia by Barwell Racing with Demon Tweeks	63	(United Kingdom) Jon Minshaw	PA	GT3	BMW Z4 GT3	BMW 4.4L V8	All
(United Kingdom) Quantamatic Racing	71	(United Kingdom) Terry Langley	S	GT4	Aston Martin V8 Vantage GT4	Aston Martin 4.7L V8	1–4
(United Kingdom) Quantamatic Racing	71	(United Kingdom) Mike Hart	S	GT4	Aston Martin V8 Vantage GT4	Aston Martin 4.7L V8	1–4
(United Kingdom) Track Group	72	(United Kingdom) Ben Clucas	PA	GT4	Lotus Evora GT4	Toyota 4.0L V6	5
(United Kingdom) Track Group	72	(United Kingdom) Adam Balon	PA	GT4	Lotus Evora GT4	Toyota 4.0L V6	5
(United Kingdom) ISSY Racing	77	(United Kingdom) Gavan Kershaw	PA	GT4	Lotus Evora GT4	Toyota 4.0L V6	All
(United Kingdom) ISSY Racing	77	(United Kingdom) Oz Yusuf	PA	GT4	Lotus Evora GT4	Toyota 4.0L V6	All
(United Kingdom) GPRM	86	(United Kingdom) Stefan Hodgetts	PA	Inv; GT4	Toyota GT86 GT4	Toyota 2.0L Flat-4	1–4, 7–9 (Note: GPRM competed at rounds 1–2 as an invitational entry and therefore was ineligible to score points. From round 3 onwards, GPRM are competing in the GT4 class.)
(United Kingdom) GPRM	86	(United Kingdom) Richard Williams	PA	Inv; GT4	Toyota GT86 GT4	Toyota 2.0L Flat-4	1–4, 7–9
(United Kingdom) GPRM	86	(United Kingdom) Stefan Hodgetts	S	Inv; GT4	Toyota GT86 GT4	Toyota 2.0L Flat-4	6
(United Kingdom) GPRM	86	(United Kingdom) James Fletcher	S	Inv; GT4	Toyota GT86 GT4	Toyota 2.0L Flat-4	6
(United Kingdom) Leonard Motorsport-AMR	87	(United Kingdom) Michael Meadows	S	GT3	Aston Martin V12 Vantage GT3	Aston Martin 6.0L V12	5
(United Kingdom) Leonard Motorsport-AMR	87	(United Kingdom) Stuart Leonard	S	GT3	Aston Martin V12 Vantage GT3	Aston Martin 6.0L V12	5
(Belgium) Aston Martin Brussels	100	(Belgium) Tim Verbergt	PA	GT3	Aston Martin V12 Vantage GT3	Aston Martin 6.0L V12	5
(Belgium) Aston Martin Brussels	100	(Belgium) Michael Schmetz	PA	GT3	Aston Martin V12 Vantage GT3	Aston Martin 6.0L V12	5
(United Kingdom) Triple Eight Racing	888	(United Kingdom) Lee Mowle	PA	GT3	BMW Z4 GT3	BMW 4.4L V8	All
(United Kingdom) Triple Eight Racing	888	(United Kingdom) Joe Osborne	PA	GT3	BMW Z4 GT3	BMW 4.4L V8	All

Notes

Icon	Class
Drivers
PA	Pro-Am
S	Silver Cup
AA	Am-Am
Car
GT3	GT3 Class
GT3B	GT3B Class
GT4	GT4 Class
GTC	Cup Class
Inv	Invitation Class

== Race calendar ==
The provisional 2015 calendar was announced on 5 November 2014. Spa-Francorchamps will host a two-hour endurance race as opposed to two hour-long races in 2014. All races except Belgian round at Spa, were held in the United Kingdom.

Round	Circuit	Date	Length	Pole position	GT3 winner	GT4 winner
1	Oulton Park	6 April	60 mins	No. 6 Oman Racing Team	No. 6 Oman Racing Team	No. 50 Optimum Motorsport
1	Oulton Park	6 April	60 mins	(United Kingdom) Rory Butcher (United Kingdom) Liam Griffin	(United Kingdom) Rory Butcher (United Kingdom) Liam Griffin	(United Kingdom) Graham Johnson (United Kingdom) Mike Robinson
2	Oulton Park	6 April	60 mins	No. 007 Beechdean-AMR	No. 007 Beechdean-AMR	No. 77 ISSY Racing
2	Oulton Park	6 April	60 mins	(United Kingdom) Jonathan Adam (United Kingdom) Andrew Howard	(United Kingdom) Jonathan Adam (United Kingdom) Andrew Howard	(United Kingdom) Gavan Kershaw (United Kingdom) Oz Yusuf
3	Rockingham	3 May	120 mins	No. 1 Ecurie Ecosse	No. 1 Ecurie Ecosse	No. 407 Beechdean-AMR
3	Rockingham	3 May	120 mins	(United Kingdom) Marco Attard (United Kingdom) Alexander Sims	(United Kingdom) Marco Attard (United Kingdom) Alexander Sims	(United Kingdom) Jamie Chadwick (United Kingdom) Ross Gunn
4	Silverstone Arena	31 May	180 mins	No. 007 Beechdean-AMR	No. 12 Von Ryan Racing	No. 407 Beechdean-AMR
4	Silverstone Arena	31 May	180 mins	(United Kingdom) Jonathan Adam (United Kingdom) Andrew Howard	(United Kingdom) Adrian Quaife-Hobbs (France) Gilles Vannelet	(United Kingdom) Jamie Chadwick (United Kingdom) Ross Gunn
5	Spa-Francorchamps	11 July	120 mins	No. 007 Beechdean-AMR	No. 007 Beechdean-AMR	No. 77 ISSY Racing
5	Spa-Francorchamps	11 July	120 mins	(United Kingdom) Jonathan Adam (United Kingdom) Andrew Howard	(United Kingdom) Jonathan Adam (United Kingdom) Andrew Howard	(United Kingdom) Gavan Kershaw (United Kingdom) Oz Yusuf
6	Brands Hatch GP	2 August	120 mins	No. 007 Beechdean-AMR	No. 1 Ecurie Ecosse	No. 56 Tolman Motorsport
6	Brands Hatch GP	2 August	120 mins	(United Kingdom) Jonathan Adam (United Kingdom) Andrew Howard	(United Kingdom) Marco Attard (United Kingdom) Alexander Sims	(United Kingdom) David Pattison (United Kingdom) Luke Davenport
7	Snetterton	23 August	60 mins	No. 27 TF Sport	No. 6 Oman Racing Team	No. 77 ISSY Racing
7	Snetterton	23 August	60 mins	(United Kingdom) Jody Fannin (United Kingdom) Andrew Jarman	(United Kingdom) Rory Butcher (United Kingdom) Liam Griffin	(United Kingdom) Gavan Kershaw (United Kingdom) Oz Yusuf
8	Snetterton	23 August	60 mins	No. 1 Ecurie Ecosse	No. 007 Beechdean-AMR	No. 48 Fox Motorsport
8	Snetterton	23 August	60 mins	(United Kingdom) Marco Attard (United Kingdom) Alexander Sims	(United Kingdom) Jonathan Adam (United Kingdom) Andrew Howard	(United Kingdom) Jamie Stanley (Italy) Fulvio Mussi
9	Donington Park	13 September	120 mins	No. 27 TF Sport	No. 17 TF Sport	No. 62 Academy Motorsport
9	Donington Park	13 September	120 mins	(United Kingdom) Jody Fannin (United Kingdom) Andrew Jarman	(United Kingdom) Matt Bell (United Kingdom) Derek Johnston	(United Kingdom) Daniel Lloyd (United Kingdom) Chris Webster

== Championship standings ==
Points system

Points are awarded as follows:

Length	1	2	3	4	5	6	7	8	9	10
60 mins	25	18	15	12	10	8	6	4	2	1
60+ mins	37.5	27	22.5	18	15	12	9	6	3	1.5

=== Drivers' championships ===
==== GT3 ====
Pos	Driver	OUL		ROC	SIL	SPA	BRH	SNE		DON	Points
1	(United Kingdom) Jonathan Adam	Ret	1	7	5	1	4	4	1	5	156.5
1	(United Kingdom) Andrew Howard	Ret	1	7	5	1	4	4	1	5	156.5
2	(United Kingdom) Alexander Sims	6	3	1	3	4	1	8	10	Ret	143.5
2	(United Kingdom) Marco Attard	6	3	1	3	4	1	8	10	Ret	143.5
3	(United Kingdom) Joe Osborne	3	5	6	2	Ret	2	5	5	4	129
3	(United Kingdom) Lee Mowle	3	5	6	2	Ret	2	5	5	4	129
4	(United Kingdom) Rory Butcher	1	4	3	6	5	6	1	14	DSQ	123.5
4	(United Kingdom) Liam Griffin	1	4	3	6	5	6	1	14	DSQ	123.5
5	(United Kingdom) Matt Bell	Ret	DNS	5	Ret	7	3	3	6	1	107
5	(United Kingdom) Derek Johnston	Ret	DNS	5	Ret	7	3	3	6	1	107
6	(United Kingdom) Phil Keen	Ret	Ret	8	Ret	2	8	12	2	3	79.5
6	(United Kingdom) Jon Minshaw	Ret	Ret	8	Ret	2	8	12	2	3	79.5
7	(United Kingdom) Andrew Jarman	8	12	9	8	Ret	Ret	2	9	2	60
7	(United Kingdom) Jody Fannin	8	12	9	8	Ret	Ret	2	9	2	60
8	(Oman) Ahmad Al Harthy	10	13	2	4	11	Ret	9	7	9	57
9	(United Kingdom) Daniel Lloyd	10	13	2	4	11	Ret	9	7		54
10	(United Kingdom) Steve Tandy	7	2	Ret	10	6	12	14	DNS	7	46.5
10	(United Kingdom) Mike Simpson	7	2	Ret	10	6	12	14	DNS	7	46.5
11	(United Kingdom) Gary Eastwood	2	6	DSQ	Ret	10	5	11	DNS		42.5
12	(United Kingdom) Adam Carroll	2	6	DSQ			5	11	DNS		41
13	(United Kingdom) Adrian Quaife-Hobbs				1						37.5
13	(France) Gilles Vannelet				1						37.5
14	(United Kingdom) Mark Farmer	Ret	7	10	Ret	9	13	7	3	8	37.5
14	(United Kingdom) Jon Barnes	Ret	7	10	Ret	9	13	7	3	8	37.5
15	(Denmark) Benny Simonsen	5	11			13	7			6	31
15	(United Kingdom) Hector Lester	5	11			13	7			6	31
16	(United Kingdom) Andrew Watson	Ret	9	Ret	7	8	10	6	13	10	28
16	(United Kingdom) Ross Wylie	Ret	9	Ret	7	8	10	6	13	10	28
17	(United Kingdom) Lewis Plato	Ret	8	4	DSQ	Ret	9	10	11	12	26
18	(United Kingdom) Alistair MacKinnon	Ret	8	4	DSQ	Ret	9	10	11		26
19	(United Kingdom) Michael Meadows					3					22.5
19	(United Kingdom) Stuart Leonard					3					22.5
20	(United Kingdom) Rick Parfitt Jr.	9	Ret	Ret	11	Ret	Ret	Ret	4	13	14
21	(United Kingdom) Mat Jackson	4	10								13
21	(United Kingdom) Phil Dryburgh	4	10								13
22	(United Kingdom) Ryan Ratcliffe							Ret	4		12
23	(United Kingdom) Euan Hankey	DSQ	DNS	DSQ				DSQ	8		4
23	(Turkey) Salih Yoluç	DSQ	DNS	DSQ				DSQ	8		4
24	(United Kingdom) Alex MacDowall									9	3
25	(United Kingdom) David Jones	11	Ret		9		11	13	12	11	3
25	(United Kingdom) Godfrey Jones	11	Ret		9		11	13	12	11	3
26	(United Kingdom) Tom Oliphant	9	Ret	Ret	11	Ret	Ret			13	2
27	(United Kingdom) Ollie Hancock					10					1.5
28	(Belgium) Tim Verbergt					12					0
28	(Belgium) Michael Schmetz					12					0
29	(United Kingdom) Bradley Ellis									12	0
30	(Belgium) Bas Leinders					14					0
30	(Belgium) Pascal Witmeur					14					0
31	(United Kingdom) Ian Loggie				Ret						0
31	(United Kingdom) Callum MacLeod				Ret						0
32	(United Kingdom) Richard Lyons				Ret						0
33	(Austria) Norbert Siedler				Ret						0
33	(United Kingdom) David Ashburn				Ret						0

Colour	Result
Gold	Winner
Silver	Second place
Bronze	Third place
Green	Points classification
Blue	Non-points classification
Blue	Non-classified finish (NC)
Purple	Retired, not classified (Ret)
Red	Did not qualify (DNQ)
Red	Did not pre-qualify (DNPQ)
Black	Disqualified (DSQ)
White	Did not start (DNS)
White	Withdrew (WD)
White	Race cancelled (C)
Blank	Did not practice (DNP)
Blank	Did not arrive (DNA)
Blank	Excluded (EX)
