= 2014 British GT Championship =

Sports car racing season

Seasons
- ← 2013 2015 →

The 2014 Avon Tyres British GT season was the 22nd season of the British GT Championship. The season began on 19 April at Oulton Park and finished on 14 September at Donington Park, after ten rounds held over seven meetings. Ecurie Ecosse driver Marco Attard won the GT3 championship, while Ross Wylie and Jake Giddings took the GT4 championship for Beechdean Motorsport.

== Entry list ==
2014 entry list
Team	No.	Drivers	Class	Chassis	Engine	Rounds
(United Kingdom) Beechdean-AMR	1	(United Kingdom) Jonathan Adam	GT3	Aston Martin V12 Vantage GT3	Aston Martin 6.0L V12	All
(United Kingdom) Beechdean-AMR	1	(United Kingdom) Andrew Howard	GT3	Aston Martin V12 Vantage GT3	Aston Martin 6.0L V12	All
(United Kingdom) Beechdean-AMR	407	(United Kingdom) Ross Wylie	GT4	Aston Martin V8 Vantage GT4	Aston Martin 4.7L V8	All
(United Kingdom) Beechdean-AMR	407	(United Kingdom) Jake Giddings	GT4	Aston Martin V8 Vantage GT4	Aston Martin 4.7L V8	All
(United Kingdom) Generation Bentley Racing	2	(United Kingdom) James Appleby	GT3	Bentley Continental GT3	Bentley 4.0L Turbo V8	1–8
(United Kingdom) Generation Bentley Racing	2	(United Kingdom) Steve Tandy	GT3	Bentley Continental GT3	Bentley 4.0L Turbo V8	1–8
(United Kingdom) Rosso Verde	3	(United Kingdom) Hector Lester	GT3	Ferrari 458 Italia GT3	Ferrari 4.5L V8	1–2, 7–10
(United Kingdom) Rosso Verde	3	(Denmark) Benny Simonsen	GT3	Ferrari 458 Italia GT3	Ferrari 4.5L V8	1–2, 7–10
Oman Racing Team	4	(United Kingdom) Michael Caine	GT3	Aston Martin V12 Vantage GT3	Aston Martin 6.0L V12	All
Oman Racing Team	4	(Oman) Ahmad Al Harthy	GT3	Aston Martin V12 Vantage GT3	Aston Martin 6.0L V12	All
Oman Racing Team	5	(United Kingdom) Rory Butcher	GT3	Aston Martin V12 Vantage GT3	Aston Martin 6.0L V12	All
Oman Racing Team	5	(United Kingdom) John Hartshorne	GT3	Aston Martin V12 Vantage GT3	Aston Martin 6.0L V12	1–2
Oman Racing Team	5	(United Kingdom) Liam Griffin	GT3	Aston Martin V12 Vantage GT3	Aston Martin 6.0L V12	3–4, 10
Oman Racing Team	5	(United Kingdom) Jeff Smith	GT3	Aston Martin V12 Vantage GT3	Aston Martin 6.0L V12	5–9
(United Kingdom) PGF Kinfaun-AMR	6	(United Kingdom) Phil Dryburgh	GT3	Aston Martin V12 Vantage GT3	Aston Martin 6.0L V12	All
(United Kingdom) PGF Kinfaun-AMR	6	(United Kingdom) John Gaw	GT3	Aston Martin V12 Vantage GT3	Aston Martin 6.0L V12	1–8
(United Kingdom) PGF Kinfaun-AMR	6	(United Kingdom) Alex MacDowall	GT3	Aston Martin V12 Vantage GT3	Aston Martin 6.0L V12	9–10
(United Kingdom) Triple Eight Race Engineering	8	(United Kingdom) Lee Mowle	GT3	BMW Z4 GT3	BMW 4.4L V8	1–4
(United Kingdom) Triple Eight Race Engineering	8	(United Kingdom) Joe Osborne	GT3	BMW Z4 GT3	BMW 4.4L V8	1–4
(United Kingdom) Triple Eight Race Engineering	8	(United Kingdom) Warren Hughes	GT3	BMW Z4 GT3	BMW 4.4L V8	9–10
(United Kingdom) Triple Eight Race Engineering	8	(United Kingdom) Jody Firth	GT3	BMW Z4 GT3	BMW 4.4L V8	9–10
(United Kingdom) Triple Eight Race Engineering	88	(United Kingdom) Lee Mowle	GT3	BMW Z4 GT3	BMW 4.4L V8	5–10
(United Kingdom) Triple Eight Race Engineering	88	(United Kingdom) Joe Osborne	GT3	BMW Z4 GT3	BMW 4.4L V8	5–8
(United Kingdom) Triple Eight Race Engineering	88	(United Kingdom) Ryan Ratcliffe	GT3	BMW Z4 GT3	BMW 4.4L V8	9–10
(United Kingdom) Triple Eight Race Engineering	888	(United Kingdom) Derek Johnston	GT3	BMW Z4 GT3	BMW 4.4L V8	All
(United Kingdom) Triple Eight Race Engineering	888	(United Kingdom) Luke Hines	GT3	BMW Z4 GT3	BMW 4.4L V8	1–8
(United Kingdom) Triple Eight Race Engineering	888	(United Kingdom) Joe Osborne	GT3	BMW Z4 GT3	BMW 4.4L V8	9–10
(United Kingdom) Trackspeed	12	(United Kingdom) Warren Hughes	GT3	Porsche 997 GT3-R	Porsche 4.0L Flat-6	1–8
(United Kingdom) Trackspeed	12	(United Kingdom) Jody Firth	GT3	Porsche 997 GT3-R	Porsche 4.0L Flat-6	1–8
(United Kingdom) Trackspeed	31	(United Kingdom) Nick Tandy	GT3	Porsche 997 GT3-R	Porsche 4.0L Flat-6	9–10
(United Kingdom) Trackspeed	31	(United Kingdom) David Ashburn	GT3	Porsche 997 GT3-R	Porsche 4.0L Flat-6	9–10
(United Kingdom) Trackspeed	33	(United Kingdom) Phil Keen	GT3	Porsche 997 GT3-R	Porsche 4.0L Flat-6	1–4
(United Kingdom) Trackspeed	33	(United Kingdom) Jon Minshaw	GT3	Porsche 997 GT3-R	Porsche 4.0L Flat-6	1–4
(United Kingdom) Trackspeed	63	(United Kingdom) Phil Keen	GT3	Porsche 997 GT3-R	Porsche 4.0L Flat-6	5–10
(United Kingdom) Trackspeed	63	(United Kingdom) Jon Minshaw	GT3	Porsche 997 GT3-R	Porsche 4.0L Flat-6	5–10
(Italy) AF Corse	13	(United Kingdom) John Dhillon	GT3	Ferrari 458 Italia GT3	Ferrari 4.5L V8	All
(Italy) AF Corse	13	(United Kingdom) Aaron Scott	GT3	Ferrari 458 Italia GT3	Ferrari 4.5L V8	All
(Italy) AF Corse	15	(Finland) Toni Vilander	GT3	Ferrari 458 Italia GT3	Ferrari 4.5L V8	7–8
(Italy) AF Corse	15	(France) Yannick Mallegol	GT3	Ferrari 458 Italia GT3	Ferrari 4.5L V8	7–8
(Italy) AF Corse	16	(France) Emmanuel Collard	GT3	Ferrari 458 Italia GT3	Ferrari 4.5L V8	7–8
(Italy) AF Corse	16	(France) François Perrodo	GT3	Ferrari 458 Italia GT3	Ferrari 4.5L V8	7–8
(Italy) AF Corse	29	(Thailand) Pasin Lathouras	GT3	Ferrari 458 Italia GT3	Ferrari 4.5L V8	All
(Italy) AF Corse	29	(United Kingdom) Richard Lyons	GT3	Ferrari 458 Italia GT3	Ferrari 4.5L V8	1–3, 5–8, 10
(Italy) AF Corse	29	(Italy) Alessandro Pier Guidi	GT3	Ferrari 458 Italia GT3	Ferrari 4.5L V8	4
(Italy) AF Corse	29	(Republic of Ireland) Matt Griffin	GT3	Ferrari 458 Italia GT3	Ferrari 4.5L V8	9
(Italy) AF Corse	30	(Belgium) Jacques Duyver	GT3	Ferrari 458 Italia GT3	Ferrari 4.5L V8	4
(Italy) AF Corse	30	(United Kingdom) Charlie Hollings	GT3	Ferrari 458 Italia GT3	Ferrari 4.5L V8	4
(United Kingdom) M-Sport Racing	17	(United Kingdom) Steven Kane	GT3	Bentley Continental GT3	Bentley 4.0L Turbo V8	1–2, 4–10
(United Kingdom) M-Sport Racing	17	(Netherlands) Rembert Berg	GT3	Bentley Continental GT3	Bentley 4.0L Turbo V8	1–2, 4
(United Kingdom) M-Sport Racing	17	(United Arab Emirates) Humaid Al Masaood	GT3	Bentley Continental GT3	Bentley 4.0L Turbo V8	5–10
(United Kingdom) FF Corse	18	(United Kingdom) Gary Eastwood	GT3	Ferrari 458 Italia GT3	Ferrari 4.5L V8	All
(United Kingdom) FF Corse	18	(United Kingdom) Rob Barff	GT3	Ferrari 458 Italia GT3	Ferrari 4.5L V8	1–4
(United Kingdom) FF Corse	18	(United Kingdom) Adam Carroll	GT3	Ferrari 458 Italia GT3	Ferrari 4.5L V8	5–9
(United Kingdom) FF Corse	18	(United Kingdom) Ollie Hancock	GT3	Ferrari 458 Italia GT3	Ferrari 4.5L V8	10
(United Kingdom) FF Corse	19	(United Kingdom) Piers Johnson	GT3	Ferrari 458 Italia GT3	Ferrari 4.5L V8	10
(United Kingdom) FF Corse	19	(United Kingdom) Ron Johnson	GT3	Ferrari 458 Italia GT3	Ferrari 4.5L V8	10
(United Kingdom) Strata21	21	(United Kingdom) Tom Onslow-Cole	GT3	Nissan GT-R GT3	Nissan VR38DETT 3.8L Turbo V6	1–2
(United Kingdom) Strata21	21	(United Kingdom) Paul White	GT3	Nissan GT-R GT3	Nissan VR38DETT 3.8L Turbo V6	1–2
(United Kingdom) Strata21	21	(United Kingdom) Tom Onslow-Cole	GT3	Aston Martin V12 Vantage GT3	Aston Martin 6.0L V12	3–10
(United Kingdom) Strata21	21	(United Kingdom) Paul White	GT3	Aston Martin V12 Vantage GT3	Aston Martin 6.0L V12	3–10
(United Kingdom) Preci-Spark Engineering	22	(United Kingdom) David Jones	GT3	McLaren MP4-12C GT3	McLaren 3.8L Turbo V8	1–2, 4–10
(United Kingdom) Preci-Spark Engineering	22	(United Kingdom) Godfrey Jones	GT3	McLaren MP4-12C GT3	McLaren 3.8L Turbo V8	1–2, 4–10
(United States) United Autosports	23	(United Kingdom) Matt Bell	GT3	Audi R8 LMS Ultra	Audi 5.2L V10	All
(United States) United Autosports	23	(United States) Mark Patterson	GT3	Audi R8 LMS Ultra	Audi 5.2L V10	1–4, 7–8, 10
(United States) United Autosports	23	(United Kingdom) Iain Dockerill	GT3	Audi R8 LMS Ultra	Audi 5.2L V10	5–6
(United States) United Autosports	23	(United Kingdom) John McCullagh	GT3	Audi R8 LMS Ultra	Audi 5.2L V10	9
(United States) United Autosports	24	(United Kingdom) Glynn Geddie	GT3	McLaren MP4-12C GT3	McLaren 3.8L Turbo V8	4
(United States) United Autosports	24	(United Kingdom) Jim Geddie	GT3	McLaren MP4-12C GT3	McLaren 3.8L Turbo V8	4
(United Kingdom) MB Racing	26	(United Kingdom) Michael Brown	GT3	Aston Martin V12 Vantage GT3	Aston Martin 6.0L V12	4
(United Kingdom) MB Racing	26	(United Kingdom) Jamie Wall	GT3	Aston Martin V12 Vantage GT3	Aston Martin 6.0L V12	4
(United Kingdom) HorsePower Racing	28	(United Kingdom) Paul Bailey	GT3	Aston Martin V12 Vantage GT3	Aston Martin 6.0L V12	1–9
(United Kingdom) HorsePower Racing	28	(United Kingdom) Andy Schulz	GT3	Aston Martin V12 Vantage GT3	Aston Martin 6.0L V12	1–9
(United Kingdom) Team LNT	32	(United Kingdom) Mike Simpson	GT3	Ginetta G55 GT3	Ginetta 4.3L V8	10
(United Kingdom) Team LNT	32	(United Kingdom) Steve Tandy	GT3	Ginetta G55 GT3	Ginetta 4.3L V8	10
(United Kingdom) MP-AMR	38	(United Kingdom) Richard Abra	GT3	Aston Martin V12 Vantage GT3	Aston Martin 6.0L V12	1–8
(United Kingdom) MP-AMR	38	(United Kingdom) Mark Poole	GT3	Aston Martin V12 Vantage GT3	Aston Martin 6.0L V12	1–8
(United Kingdom) MP-AMR	38	(United Kingdom) Tom Sharp	GT3	Aston Martin V12 Vantage GT3	Aston Martin 6.0L V12	9
(United Kingdom) MP-AMR	38	(United Kingdom) Colin White	GT3	Aston Martin V12 Vantage GT3	Aston Martin 6.0L V12	9
(United Kingdom) IDL CWS Racing	40	(United Kingdom) Tom Sharp	GT3	Ginetta G55 GT3	Ginetta 4.3L V8	1–8
(United Kingdom) IDL CWS Racing	40	(United Kingdom) Colin White	GT3	Ginetta G55 GT3	Ginetta 4.3L V8	1–4, 7–8
(United Kingdom) IDL CWS Racing	40	(United Kingdom) Ian Stinton	GT3	Ginetta G55 GT3	Ginetta 4.3L V8	5–6
(United Kingdom) Optimum Motorsport	41	(United Kingdom) Matt Draper	GT4	Ginetta G55 GT4	Ford Cyclone 3.7L V6	1–8
(United Kingdom) Optimum Motorsport	41	(Australia) Tania Mann	GT4	Ginetta G55 GT4	Ford Cyclone 3.7L V6	1–3
(United Kingdom) Optimum Motorsport	41	(United Kingdom) Ryan Ratcliffe	GT4	Ginetta G55 GT4	Ford Cyclone 3.7L V6	4
(United Kingdom) Optimum Motorsport	41	(United Kingdom) Jade Edwards	GT4	Ginetta G55 GT4	Ford Cyclone 3.7L V6	5–8
(United Kingdom) Century Motorsport	42	(United Kingdom) Tom Oliphant	GT4	Ginetta G55 GT4	Ford Cyclone 3.7L V6	All
(United Kingdom) Century Motorsport	42	(United Kingdom) Rick Parfitt Jr.	GT4	Ginetta G55 GT4	Ford Cyclone 3.7L V6	All
(United Kingdom) Century Motorsport	43	(Denmark) Morten Dons	GT4	Ginetta G55 GT4	Ford Cyclone 3.7L V6	All
(United Kingdom) Century Motorsport	43	(Norway) Aleksander Schjerpen	GT4	Ginetta G55 GT4	Ford Cyclone 3.7L V6	All
(United Kingdom) Team Parker Racing	44	(United Kingdom) Barrie Baxter	GT4	Porsche 997 GT4	Porsche 3.6L Flat-6	All
(United Kingdom) Team Parker Racing	44	(United Kingdom) Daniel Cammish	GT4	Porsche 997 GT4	Porsche 3.6L Flat-6	All
(United Kingdom) ABG Motorsport	45	(United Kingdom) Declan Jones	GT4	BMW M3 GT4	BMW 4.0L V8	1–2, 4
(United Kingdom) ABG Motorsport	45	(United Kingdom) Peter Belshaw	GT4	BMW M3 GT4	BMW 4.0L V8	1–2
(United Kingdom) ABG Motorsport	45	(France) Alain Schlesinger	GT4	BMW M3 GT4	BMW 4.0L V8	4
(United Kingdom) Geoff Steel Racing	45	(United Kingdom) Declan Jones	GT4	BMW M3 GT4	BMW 4.0L V8	9
(United Kingdom) Geoff Steel Racing	45	(United Kingdom) Jeff Wyatt	GT4	BMW M3 GT4	BMW 4.0L V8	9
(United Kingdom) Twisted Team Parker	46	(United Kingdom) Bradley Ellis	GT4	Ginetta G55 GT4	Ford Cyclone 3.7L V6	All
(United Kingdom) Twisted Team Parker	46	(United Kingdom) Adrian Barwick	GT4	Ginetta G55 GT4	Ford Cyclone 3.7L V6	All
(United Kingdom) Silverstone Auctions-AMR	47	(United Kingdom) Andy Ruhan	GT4	Aston Martin V8 Vantage GT4	Aston Martin 4.7L V8	1–2
(United Kingdom) Silverstone Auctions-AMR	47	(United Kingdom) Harry Whale	GT4	Aston Martin V8 Vantage GT4	Aston Martin 4.7L V8	1–2
(United Kingdom) Fox Motorsport	48	(United Kingdom) Jamie Stanley	GT4	Ginetta G55 GT4	Ford Cyclone 3.7L V6	All
(United Kingdom) Fox Motorsport	48	(United Kingdom) Paul McNeilly	GT4	Ginetta G55 GT4	Ford Cyclone 3.7L V6	All
(United Kingdom) TF Sport	49	(United Kingdom) Andrew Jarman	GT4	Aston Martin V8 Vantage GT4	Aston Martin 4.7L V8	All
(United Kingdom) TF Sport	49	(United Kingdom) Devon Modell	GT4	Aston Martin V8 Vantage GT4	Aston Martin 4.7L V8	All
(United Kingdom) Track Group	50	(United Kingdom) Bolaji Odunsi	GT4	Aston Martin V8 Vantage GT4	Aston Martin 4.7L V8	4
(United Kingdom) Track Group	50	(United Kingdom) Paul O'Neill	GT4	Aston Martin V8 Vantage GT4	Aston Martin 4.7L V8	4
(United Kingdom) Academy Motorsport	55	(United Kingdom) Oli Basey-Fisher	GT4	Ginetta G55 GT4	Ford Cyclone 3.7L V6	1–8
(United Kingdom) Academy Motorsport	55	(United Kingdom) Matt Nicoll-Jones	GT4	Ginetta G55 GT4	Ford Cyclone 3.7L V6	1–8
(United Kingdom) APO Sport	69	(United Kingdom) Alex Osborne	GT4	Porsche 997 GT4	Porsche 3.6L Flat-6	4, 7–8, 10
(United Kingdom) APO Sport	69	(United Kingdom) James May	GT4	Porsche 997 GT4	Porsche 3.6L Flat-6	4, 7–8, 10
(United Kingdom) ISSY Racing	77	(United Kingdom) Gavan Kershaw	GT4	Lotus Evora GT4	Toyota 4.0L V6	All
(United Kingdom) ISSY Racing	77	(United Kingdom) Oz Yusuf	GT4	Lotus Evora GT4	Toyota 4.0L V6	All
Team Russia by Barwell	78	(Russia) Timur Sardarov	GT3	BMW Z4 GT3	BMW 4.4L V8	7–8
Team Russia by Barwell	78	(United Kingdom) Jonny Cocker	GT3	BMW Z4 GT3	BMW 4.4L V8	7–8
(United Kingdom) Ecurie Ecosse powered by Black Bull	79	(United Kingdom) Marco Attard	GT3	BMW Z4 GT3	BMW 4.4L V8	All
(United Kingdom) Ecurie Ecosse powered by Black Bull	79	(United Kingdom) Alexander Sims	GT3	BMW Z4 GT3	BMW 4.4L V8	1–4, 7–10
(United Kingdom) Ecurie Ecosse powered by Black Bull	79	(United Kingdom) Jonny Cocker	GT3	BMW Z4 GT3	BMW 4.4L V8	5–6
(United Kingdom) Nissan GT Academy Team RJN	80	(United Kingdom) Chris Hoy	GT3	Nissan GT-R Nismo GT3	Nissan VR38DETT 3.8L Turbo V6	All
(United Kingdom) Nissan GT Academy Team RJN	80	(United Kingdom) Alex Buncombe	GT3	Nissan GT-R Nismo GT3	Nissan VR38DETT 3.8L Turbo V6	1–4
(United Kingdom) Nissan GT Academy Team RJN	80	(Belgium) Wolfgang Reip	GT3	Nissan GT-R Nismo GT3	Nissan VR38DETT 3.8L Turbo V6	5–8, 10
(United Kingdom) Nissan GT Academy Team RJN	80	(United Kingdom) Jann Mardenborough	GT3	Nissan GT-R Nismo GT3	Nissan VR38DETT 3.8L Turbo V6	9
(United Kingdom) GPRM Toyota	86	(United Kingdom) Stefan Hodgetts	Inv	Toyota GT86 GT4	Subaru 2.0L Flat-4	4, 9–10
(United Kingdom) GPRM Toyota	86	(United Kingdom) James Fletcher	Inv	Toyota GT86 GT4	Subaru 2.0L Flat-4	4, 9–10

Icon	Class
GT3	GT3 Class
GT3B	GT3B Class
GT4	GT4 Class
GTC	Cup Class
Inv	Invitation Class

== Race calendar and results ==
The provisional 2014 calendar was announced on 5 October 2013. Spa-Francorchamps replaced Zandvoort as the overseas round. All races except Belgian round at Spa, were held in the United Kingdom.

Round	Circuit	Date	Length	Pole position	GT3 winner	GT4 winner
1	Oulton Park	21 April	60 mins	No. 4 Oman Racing Team	No. 4 Oman Racing Team	No. 407 Beechdean-AMR
1	Oulton Park	21 April	60 mins	(United Kingdom) Michael Caine (Oman) Ahmad Al Harthy	(United Kingdom) Michael Caine (Oman) Ahmad Al Harthy	(United Kingdom) Ross Wylie (United Kingdom) Jake Giddings
2	Oulton Park	21 April	60 mins	No. 79 Ecurie Ecosse	No. 79 Ecurie Ecosse	No. 49 TF Sport
2	Oulton Park	21 April	60 mins	(United Kingdom) Alexander Sims (United Kingdom) Marco Attard	(United Kingdom) Alexander Sims (United Kingdom) Marco Attard	(United Kingdom) Andrew Jarman (United Kingdom) Devon Modell
3	Rockingham	5 May	120 mins	No. 79 Ecurie Ecosse	No. 18 FF Corse	No. 55 Academy Motorsport
3	Rockingham	5 May	120 mins	(United Kingdom) Alexander Sims (United Kingdom) Marco Attard	(United Kingdom) Rob Barff (United Kingdom) Gary Eastwood	(United Kingdom) Oli Basey-Fisher (United Kingdom) Matt Nicoll-Jones
4	Silverstone Arena	1 June	180 mins	No. 1 Beechdean-AMR	No. 4 Oman Racing Team	No. 46 Twisted Team Parker
4	Silverstone Arena	1 June	180 mins	(United Kingdom) Jonathan Adam (United Kingdom) Andrew Howard	(United Kingdom) Michael Caine (Oman) Ahmad Al Harthy	(United Kingdom) Bradley Ellis (United Kingdom) Adrian Barwick
5	Snetterton	22 June	60 mins	No. 79 Ecurie Ecosse	No. 63 Trackspeed	No. 77 ISSY Racing
5	Snetterton	22 June	60 mins	(United Kingdom) Jonny Cocker (United Kingdom) Marco Attard	(United Kingdom) Phil Keen (United Kingdom) Jon Minshaw	(United Kingdom) Gavan Kershaw (United Kingdom) Oz Yusuf
6	Snetterton	22 June	60 mins	No. 1 Beechdean-AMR	No. 1 Beechdean-AMR	No. 46 Twisted Team Parker
6	Snetterton	22 June	60 mins	(United Kingdom) Jonathan Adam (United Kingdom) Andrew Howard	(United Kingdom) Jonathan Adam (United Kingdom) Andrew Howard	(United Kingdom) Bradley Ellis (United Kingdom) Adrian Barwick
7	Spa-Francorchamps	12 July	60 mins	No. 79 Ecurie Ecosse	No. 63 Trackspeed	No. 49 TF Sport
7	Spa-Francorchamps	12 July	60 mins	(United Kingdom) Alexander Sims (United Kingdom) Marco Attard	(United Kingdom) Phil Keen (United Kingdom) Jon Minshaw	(United Kingdom) Andrew Jarman (United Kingdom) Devon Modell
8	Spa-Francorchamps	12 July	60 mins	No. 79 Ecurie Ecosse	No. 79 Ecurie Ecosse	No. 407 Beechdean-AMR
8	Spa-Francorchamps	12 July	60 mins	(United Kingdom) Alexander Sims (United Kingdom) Marco Attard	(United Kingdom) Alexander Sims (United Kingdom) Marco Attard	(United Kingdom) Ross Wylie (United Kingdom) Jake Giddings
9	Brands Hatch GP	31 August	120 mins	No. 1 Beechdean-AMR	No. 31 Trackspeed	No. 407 Beechdean-AMR
9	Brands Hatch GP	31 August	120 mins	(United Kingdom) Jonathan Adam (United Kingdom) Andrew Howard	(United Kingdom) Nick Tandy (United Kingdom) David Ashburn	(United Kingdom) Ross Wylie (United Kingdom) Jake Giddings
10	Donington Park	14 September	120 mins	No. 4 Oman Racing Team	No. 63 Trackspeed	No. 42 Century Motorsport
10	Donington Park	14 September	120 mins	(United Kingdom) Michael Caine (Oman) Ahmad Al Harthy	(United Kingdom) Phil Keen (United Kingdom) Jon Minshaw	(United Kingdom) Tom Oliphant (United Kingdom) Rick Parfitt Jr.

== Championship standings ==
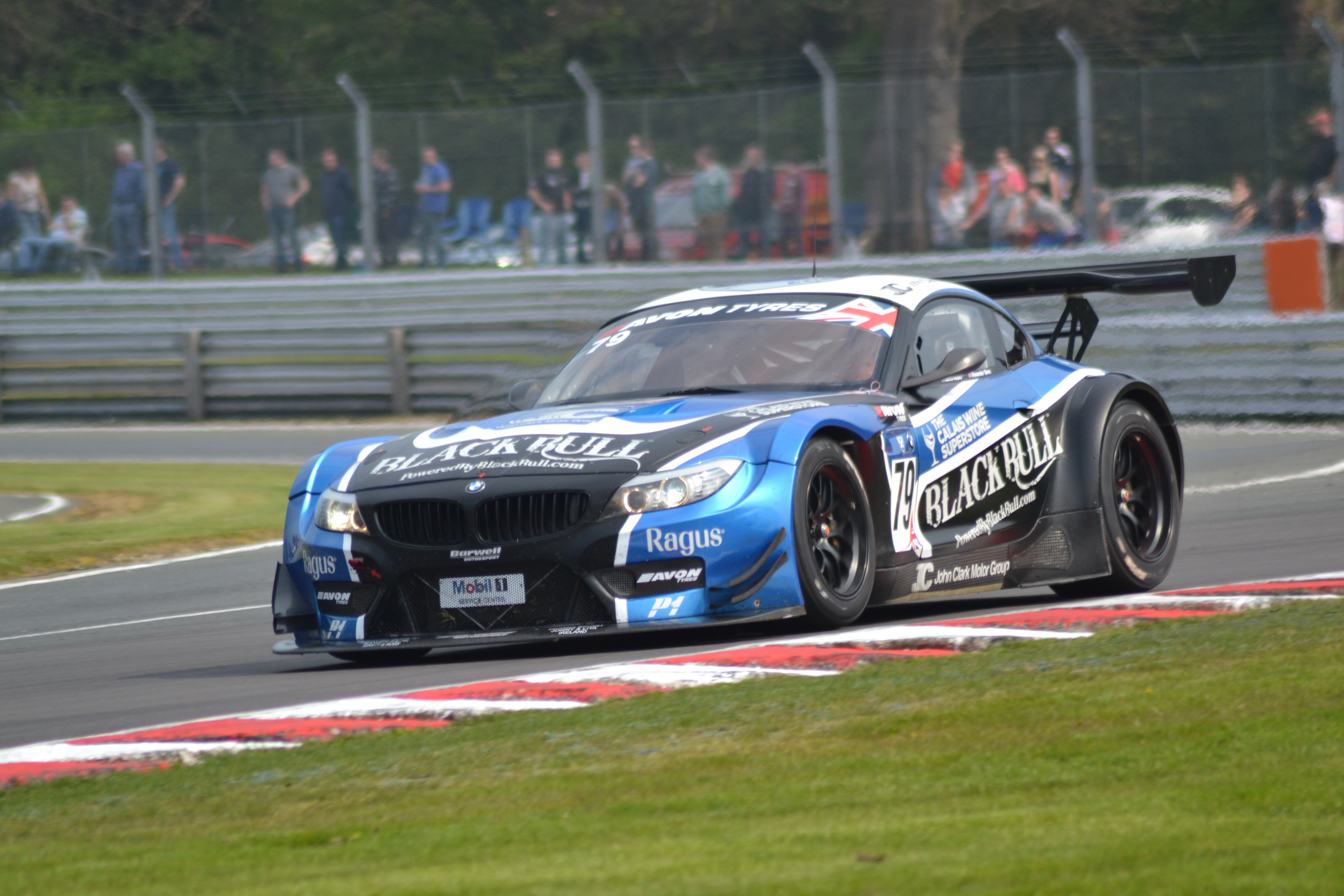
Marco Attard won the GT3 Drivers' Championship driving a BMW Z4 GT3

Points system

Points are awarded as follows:

Length	1	2	3	4	5	6	7	8	9	10
60 mins	25	18	15	12	10	8	6	4	2	1
60+ mins	37.5	27	22.5	18	15	12	9	6	3	1.5

=== Drivers' championships ===
==== GT3 ====
Pos	Driver	OUL		ROC	SIL	SNE		SPA		BRH	DON	Pen.	Points
1	(United Kingdom) Marco Attard	Ret	1	2	3	2	10	4	1	4	Ret		148.5
2	(Oman) Ahmad Al Harthy	1	7	10	1	8	12	2	10	2	4		138
2	(United Kingdom) Michael Caine	1	7	10	1	8	12	2	10	2	4		138
3	(United Kingdom) Alexander Sims	Ret	1	2	3			4	1	4	Ret		129.5
4	(United Kingdom) Phil Keen	10	2	Ret	27†	1	4	1	Ret	9	1		121.5
4	(United Kingdom) Jon Minshaw	10	2	Ret	27†	1	4	1	Ret	9	1		121.5
5	(United Kingdom) Jonathan Adam	3	3	5	2	6	1	9	15	16	Ret	9	98
5	(United Kingdom) Andrew Howard	3	3	5	2	6	1	9	15	16	Ret	9	98
6	(United Kingdom) Gary Eastwood	24†	Ret	1	Ret	Ret	2	21	3	8	2	12	91.5
7	(Thailand) Pasin Lathouras	2	6	7	5	13	9	7	8	5	8	9	74
8	(United Kingdom) Matt Bell	4	Ret	Ret	Ret	7	6	5	22	17	3		58.5
9	(United Kingdom) Rory Butcher	13	15	12	9	11	13	3	13	3	5		55.5
10	(United Kingdom) Tom Onslow-Cole	16	16	4	10	9	3	14	6	7	21		53.5
10	(United Kingdom) Paul White	16	16	4	10	9	3	14	6	7	21		53.5
11	(United Kingdom) Nick Tandy									1	7		46.5
11	(United Kingdom) David Ashburn									1	7		46.5
12	(United States) Mark Patterson	4	Ret	Ret	Ret			5	22		3		44.5
13	(United Kingdom) Richard Lyons	2	6	7		13	9	7	8		8	9	44
14	(United Kingdom) Derek Johnston	7	5	3	6	DSQ	Ret	13	Ret	Ret	9	12	41.5
15	(United Kingdom) Adam Carroll					Ret	2	21	3	8			39
16	(United Kingdom) Luke Hines	7	5	3	6	DSQ	Ret	13	Ret			12	38.5
17	(United Kingdom) Jeff Smith					11	13	3	13	3			37.5
18	(United Kingdom) Phil Dryburgh	5	4	Ret	DSQ	5	DSQ	Ret	9	6	6	24	34
19	(United Kingdom) Richard Abra	6	8	6	8	4	7	11	14			15	33
19	(United Kingdom) Mark Poole	6	8	6	8	4	7	11	14			15	33
20	(United Kingdom) Chris Hoy	9	13	13	7	14	16	16	2	11	11		29
21	(United Kingdom) Joe Osborne	DNS	DNS	11	11	3	5	18	5	Ret	9	9	29
22	(United Kingdom) Lee Mowle	DNS	DNS	11	11	3	5	18	5	10	24†	9	27.5
23	(United Kingdom) Ollie Hancock										2		27
24	(United Kingdom) Rob Barff	24†	Ret	1	Ret							12	25.5
25	(United Kingdom) Alex MacDowall									6	6		24
26	(United Kingdom) Jonny Cocker					2	10	19	21				19
27	(Belgium) Wolfgang Reip					14	16	16	2		11		18
28	(United Kingdom) Liam Griffin			12	9						5		18
29	(United Kingdom) Steven Kane	8	17		4	Ret	24	Ret	18	Ret	14	6	16
29	(Netherlands) Rembert Berg	8	17		4							6	16
30	(Italy) Alessandro Pier Guidi				5								15
30	(Republic of Ireland) Matt Griffin									5			15
31	(United Kingdom) Iain Dockerill					7	6						14
32	(United Kingdom) Jody Firth	Ret	Ret	15	12	27†	11	Ret	4	Ret	Ret		12
32	(United Kingdom) Warren Hughes	Ret	Ret	15	12	27†	11	Ret	4	Ret	Ret		12
33	(United Kingdom) Alex Buncombe	9	13	13	7								11
34	(United Kingdom) John Gaw	5	4	Ret	DSQ	5	DSQ	Ret	9			24	10
35	(France) Emmanuel Collard							6	12				8
35	(France) François Perrodo							6	12				8
36	(United Kingdom) John Dhillon	11	18	8	14	12	14	12	17	Ret	10		7.5
36	(United Kingdom) Aaron Scott	11	18	8	14	12	14	12	17	Ret	10		7.5
37	(United Kingdom) Paul Bailey	15	12	9	Ret	15	Ret	8	11	14			7
37	(United Kingdom) Andy Schulz	15	12	9	Ret	15	Ret	8	11	14			7
38	(France) Yannick Mallegol							15	7				6
38	(Finland) Toni Vilander							15	7				6
39	(United Kingdom) Steve Tandy	18	9	14	DNS	10	8	10	20		Ret	6	2
39	(United Kingdom) James Appleby	18	9	14	DNS	10	8	10	20			6	2
40	(United Kingdom) Ryan Ratcliffe									10	24†		1.5
	(United Kingdom) David Jones	Ret	11		15	17	15	22	16	13	Ret		0
	(United Kingdom) Godfrey Jones	Ret	11		15	17	15	22	16	13	Ret		0
	(United Kingdom) Jann Mardenborough									11			0
	(United Kingdom) Hector Lester	14	14					20	19	12	12		0
	(Denmark) Benny Simonsen	14	14					20	19	12	12		0
	(United Kingdom) John Hartshorne	13	15										0
	(Belgium) Jacques Duyver				13								0
	(United Kingdom) Charlie Hollings				13								0
	(United Kingdom) Piers Johnson										13		0
	(United Kingdom) Ron Johnson										13		0
	(United Arab Emirates) Humaid Al Masaood					Ret	24	Ret	18	Ret	14		0
	(United Kingdom) Ian Stinton					16	Ret						0
	(United Kingdom) Michael Brown				16								0
	(United Kingdom) Jamie Wall				16								0
	(United Kingdom) John McCullagh									17			0
	(Russia) Timur Sardarov							19	21				0
	(United Kingdom) Glynn Geddie				Ret								0
	(United Kingdom) Jim Geddie				Ret								0
	(United Kingdom) Mike Simpson										Ret		0
	(United Kingdom) Tom Sharp	12	10	Ret	28†	16	Ret	17	Ret	15		6	−5
	(United Kingdom) Colin White	12	10	Ret	28†			17	Ret	15		6	−5
Pos	Driver	OUL		ROC	SIL	SNE		SPA		BRH	DON	Pen.	Points

Colour	Result
Gold	Winner
Silver	Second place
Bronze	Third place
Green	Points classification
Blue	Non-points classification
Blue	Non-classified finish (NC)
Purple	Retired, not classified (Ret)
Red	Did not qualify (DNQ)
Red	Did not pre-qualify (DNPQ)
Black	Disqualified (DSQ)
White	Did not start (DNS)
White	Withdrew (WD)
White	Race cancelled (C)
Blank	Did not practice (DNP)
Blank	Did not arrive (DNA)
Blank	Excluded (EX)

==== GT4 ====
Pos	Driver	OUL		ROC	SIL	SNE		SPA		BRH	DON	Pen.	Points
1	(United Kingdom) Jake Giddings	17	22	17	20	19	20	24	23	18	19		207.5
1	(United Kingdom) Ross Wylie	17	22	17	20	19	20	24	23	18	19		207.5
2	(United Kingdom) Andrew Jarman	20	19	18	19	22	21	23	29	19	16		190
2	(United Kingdom) Devon Modell	20	19	18	19	22	21	23	29	19	16		190
3	(United Kingdom) Adrian Barwick	Ret	25	21	17	23	17	28	26	25	17		140
3	(United Kingdom) Bradley Ellis	Ret	25	21	17	23	17	28	26	25	17		140
4	(United Kingdom) Tom Oliphant	Ret	Ret	23	24†	20	18	26	25	23	15		121.5
4	(United Kingdom) Rick Parfitt Jr.	Ret	Ret	23	24†	20	18	26	25	23	15		121.5
5	(Denmark) Morten Dons	23	20	Ret	21	21	19	27	Ret	22	22†		104
5	(Norway) Aleksander Schjerpen	23	20	Ret	21	21	19	27	Ret	22	22†		104
6	(United Kingdom) Gavan Kershaw	19	21	Ret	25	18	Ret	25	24	Ret	23		100
6	(United Kingdom) Oz Yusuf	19	21	Ret	25	18	Ret	25	24	Ret	23		100
7	(United Kingdom) Paul McNeilly	Ret	26	19	23	24	25†	30	27	20	18		95.5
7	(United Kingdom) Jamie Stanley	Ret	26	19	23	24	25†	30	27	20	18		95.5
8	(United Kingdom) Barrie Baxter	26	27	20	22	26	22	29	Ret	21	20		83
8	(United Kingdom) Daniel Cammish	26	27	20	22	26	22	29	Ret	21	20		83
9	(United Kingdom) Matt Draper	21	24	22	18	28†	DNS	31	Ret				59
10	(United Kingdom) Oli Basey-Fisher	25	Ret	16	Ret	25	23	Ret	DNS				53.5
10	(United Kingdom) Matt Nicoll-Jones	25	Ret	16	Ret	25	23	Ret	DNS				53.5
11	(Australia) Tania Mann	21	24	22									29
12	(United Kingdom) Ryan Ratcliffe				18								27
13	(United Kingdom) Peter Belshaw	22	23										20
14	(United Kingdom) Declan Jones	22	23		DSQ					Ret		12	8
15	(United Kingdom) James May				Ret			Ret	28		Ret		8
15	(United Kingdom) Alex Osborne				Ret			Ret	28		Ret		8
16	(United Kingdom) Jade Edwards					28†	DNS	31	Ret				3
17	(United Kingdom) Paul O'Neill				26								1.5
17	(United Kingdom) Bolaji Odunsi				26								1.5
	(United Kingdom) Jeff Wyatt									Ret			0
	(New Zealand) Richie Stanaway	DNS	DNS										0
	(United Kingdom) Harry Whale	DNS	DNS										0
	(France) Alain Schlesinger				DSQ							12	−12
Guest drivers ineligible for points
	(United Kingdom) James Fletcher				DNS					24	25†		0
	(United Kingdom) Stefan Hodgetts				DNS					24	25†		0
Pos	Driver	OUL		ROC	SIL	SNE		SPA		BRH	DON	Pen.	Points

Colour	Result
Gold	Winner
Silver	Second place
Bronze	Third place
Green	Points classification
Blue	Non-points classification
Blue	Non-classified finish (NC)
Purple	Retired, not classified (Ret)
Red	Did not qualify (DNQ)
Red	Did not pre-qualify (DNPQ)
Black	Disqualified (DSQ)
White	Did not start (DNS)
White	Withdrew (WD)
White	Race cancelled (C)
Blank	Did not practice (DNP)
Blank	Did not arrive (DNA)
Blank	Excluded (EX)

=== Teams' championships ===
==== GT3 ====
Pos	Team	OUL		ROC	SIL	SNE		SPA		BRH	DON	Points
1	Oman Racing Team	1	7	10	1	8	12	2	10	2	4	193.5
1	Oman Racing Team	13	15	12	9	11	13	3	13	3	5	193.5
2	(United Kingdom) Trackspeed	10	2	15	12	1	4	1	4	1	1	180
2	(United Kingdom) Trackspeed	Ret	Ret	Ret	27†	27†	11	Ret	Ret	9	7	180
3	(United Kingdom) Ecurie Ecosse	Ret	1	2	3	2	10	4	1	4	Ret	148.5
4	(United Kingdom) Beechdean-AMR	3	3	5	2	6	1	9	15	16	Ret	107
5	(Italy) AF Corse	2	6	7	5	12	9	6	7	5	8	104.5
5	(Italy) AF Corse	11	18	8	13	13	14	7	8	Ret	10	104.5
6	(United Kingdom) FF Corse	24†	Ret	1	Ret	Ret	2	21	3	8	2	103.5
6	(United Kingdom) FF Corse										13	103.5
7	(United Kingdom) Triple Eight Race Engineering	7	5	3	6	3	5	13	5	10	9	90
7	(United Kingdom) Triple Eight Race Engineering	DNS	DNS	11	11	DSQ	Ret	18	Ret	Ret	24†	90
8	(United States) United Autosports	4	Ret	Ret	Ret	7	6	5	22	17	3	58.5
8	(United States) United Autosports				Ret							58.5
9	(United Kingdom) PGF Kinfaun-AMR	5	4	Ret	DSQ	5	DSQ	Ret	9	6	6	58
10	(United Kingdom) Strata21	16	16	4	10	9	3	14	6	7	21	53.5
11	(United Kingdom) MP-AMR	6	8	6	8	4	7	11	14	15		48
12	(United Kingdom) Nissan GT Academy Team RJN	9	13	13	7	14	16	16	2	11	11	29
13	(United Kingdom) M-Sport Racing	8	17		4	Ret	24	Ret	18	Ret	14	22
14	(United Kingdom) Generation Bentley Racing	18	9	14	DNS	10	8	10	20			8
15	(United Kingdom) HorsePower Racing	15	12	9	Ret	15	Ret	8	11	14		7
16	(United Kingdom) IDL CWS Racing	12	10	Ret	28†	16	Ret	17	Ret			1
	(United Kingdom) Preci-Spark Engineering	Ret	11		15	17	15	22	16	13	Ret	0
	(United Kingdom) Rosso Verde	14	14					20	19	12	12	0
	(United Kingdom) MB Racing				16							0
	Team Russia by Barwell							19	21			0
	(United Kingdom) Team LNT										Ret	0
Pos	Team	OUL		ROC	SIL	SNE		SPA		BRH	DON	Points

==== GT4 ====
Pos	Team	OUL		ROC	SIL	SNE		SPA		BRH	DON	Points
1	(United Kingdom) Century Motorsport	23	20	23	21	20	18	26	25	22	15	225.5
1	(United Kingdom) Century Motorsport	Ret	Ret	Ret	24†	21	19	27	Ret	23	22†	225.5
2	(United Kingdom) Beechdean-AMR	17	22	17	20	19	20	24	23	18	19	207.5
3	(United Kingdom) TF Sport	20	19	18	19	22	21	23	29	19	16	190
4	(United Kingdom) Twisted Team Parker	Ret	25	21	17	23	17	28	26	25	17	140
5	(United Kingdom) ISSY Racing	19	21	Ret	25	18	Ret	25	24	Ret	23	100
6	(United Kingdom) Fox Motorsport	Ret	26	19	23	24	25†	30	27	20	18	95.5
7	(United Kingdom) Team Parker Racing	26	27	20	22	26	22	29	Ret	21	20	83
8	(United Kingdom) Optimum Motorsport	21	24	22	18	28†	DNS	31	Ret			59
9	(United Kingdom) Academy Motorsport	25	Ret	16	Ret	25	23	Ret	DNS			54.5
10	(United Kingdom) ABG Motorsport	22	23		DSQ							20
11	(United Kingdom) APO Sport				Ret			Ret	28		Ret	8
11	(United Kingdom) Track Group				26							1.5
	(United Kingdom) Geoff Steel Racing									Ret		0
	(United Kingdom) Silverstone Auctions-AMR	DNS	DNS									0
Guest teams ineligible for points
	(United Kingdom) GPRM Toyota				DNS					24	25†	0
Pos	Team	OUL		ROC	SIL	SNE		SPA		BRH	DON	Points
