= 2016 British GT Championship =

Sports car racing season

The 2016 British GT Championship was the 24th British GT Championship. The season began on 17 April at Brands Hatch and finished on 11 September at Donington Park, after nine rounds held over seven meetings. After using Avon Tires since 2006, the championship switched to Pirelli tires this season, in order to mirror that of other GT3 and GT4 categories promoted by the Stéphane Ratel Organisation.

== Entry list ==
=== GT3 ===
Team	Car	Engine	No.	Drivers	Class	Rounds
(United Kingdom) Beechdean AMR	1	(United Kingdom) Ross Gunn	PA	Aston Martin V12 Vantage GT3	Aston Martin 6.0L V12	1—6, 8
(United Kingdom) Beechdean AMR	1	(United Kingdom) Andrew Howard	PA	Aston Martin V12 Vantage GT3	Aston Martin 6.0L V12	1—6, 8
(United Kingdom) FF Corse	2	(United Kingdom) Adam Carroll	PA	Ferrari 488 GT3	Ferrari 3.9L Turbo V8	5
(United Kingdom) FF Corse	2	(United Kingdom) Marco Attard	PA	Ferrari 488 GT3	Ferrari 3.9L Turbo V8	5
(United Kingdom) PFL Motorsport	5	(United Kingdom) Pete Littler	PA	Aston Martin V12 Vantage GT3	Aston Martin 6.0L V12	1—5, 7
(United Kingdom) PFL Motorsport	5	(United Kingdom) Jody Fannin	PA	Aston Martin V12 Vantage GT3	Aston Martin 6.0L V12	1—5, 7
(United Kingdom) Barwell Motorsport	6	(United Kingdom) Liam Griffin	PA	Lamborghini Huracán GT3	Lamborghini 5.2L V10	All
(United Kingdom) Barwell Motorsport	6	(Italy) Fabio Babini	PA	Lamborghini Huracán GT3	Lamborghini 5.2L V10	1
(United Kingdom) Barwell Motorsport	6	(United Kingdom) Adam Carroll	PA	Lamborghini Huracán GT3	Lamborghini 5.2L V10	2–4
(United Kingdom) Barwell Motorsport	6	(United Kingdom) Alexander Sims	PA	Lamborghini Huracán GT3	Lamborghini 5.2L V10	5–8
(United Kingdom) Barwell Motorsport	33	(United Kingdom) Phil Keen	PA	Lamborghini Huracán GT3	Lamborghini 5.2L V10	All
(United Kingdom) Barwell Motorsport	33	(United Kingdom) Jon Minshaw	PA	Lamborghini Huracán GT3	Lamborghini 5.2L V10	All
(United Kingdom) Barwell Motorsport	666	(United Kingdom) Mark Poole	S	Lamborghini Huracán GT3	Lamborghini 5.2L V10	5
(United Kingdom) Barwell Motorsport	666	(United Kingdom) Richard Abra	S	Lamborghini Huracán GT3	Lamborghini 5.2L V10	5
(United Kingdom) AmDTuning.com	7	(United Kingdom) Lee Mowle	PA	BMW Z4 GT3	BMW 4.4L V8	1-7
(United Kingdom) AmDTuning.com	7	(United Kingdom) Joe Osborne	PA	BMW Z4 GT3	BMW 4.4L V8	1-7
(United Kingdom) Motorbase Performance	8	(United Kingdom) Phil Dryburgh	PA	Aston Martin V12 Vantage GT3	Aston Martin 6.0L V12	All
(United Kingdom) Motorbase Performance	8	(United Kingdom) Ross Wylie	PA	Aston Martin V12 Vantage GT3	Aston Martin 6.0L V12	All
(United Kingdom) TF Sport	11	(United Kingdom) Jon Barnes	PA	Aston Martin V12 Vantage GT3	Aston Martin 6.0L V12	All
(United Kingdom) TF Sport	11	(United Kingdom) Mark Farmer	PA	Aston Martin V12 Vantage GT3	Aston Martin 6.0L V12	All
(United Kingdom) TF Sport	17	(United Kingdom) Jonathan Adam	PA	Aston Martin V12 Vantage GT3	Aston Martin 6.0L V12	All
(United Kingdom) TF Sport	17	(United Kingdom) Derek Johnston	PA	Aston Martin V12 Vantage GT3	Aston Martin 6.0L V12	All
(United Kingdom) Optimum Motorsport	14	(United Kingdom) Will Moore	S	Audi R8 LMS	Audi 5.2L V10	1–6
(United Kingdom) Optimum Motorsport	14	(United Kingdom) Ryan Ratcliffe	S	Audi R8 LMS	Audi 5.2L V10	1–6
(Austria) GRT Grasser Racing Team	19	(Italy) Michele Beretta	PA	Lamborghini Huracán GT3	Lamborghini 5.2L V10	6
(Austria) GRT Grasser Racing Team	19	(Germany) "Coach McKansy"	PA	Lamborghini Huracán GT3	Lamborghini 5.2L V10	6
(Austria) GRT Grasser Racing Team	63	(United Kingdom) Hunter Abbott	PA	Lamborghini Huracán GT3	Lamborghini 5.2L V10	6
(Austria) GRT Grasser Racing Team	63	(Switzerland) Rolf Ineichen	PA	Lamborghini Huracán GT3	Lamborghini 5.2L V10	6
(United Kingdom) Team Parker Racing	24	(United Kingdom) Ian Loggie	PA	Bentley Continental GT3	Bentley 4.0L Turbo V8	5–6
(United Kingdom) Team Parker Racing	24	(United Kingdom) Callum MacLeod	PA	Bentley Continental GT3	Bentley 4.0L Turbo V8	5–6
(United Kingdom) Team Parker Racing	31	(United Kingdom) Rick Parfitt Jr.	PA	Bentley Continental GT3	Bentley 4.0L Turbo V8	All
(United Kingdom) Team Parker Racing	31	(United Kingdom) Seb Morris	PA	Bentley Continental GT3	Bentley 4.0L Turbo V8	All
(United Kingdom) Ultimate Speed / Mike Brown	26	(United Kingdom) Mike Brown	PA	Aston Martin V12 Vantage GT3	Aston Martin 6.0L V12	5, 7
(United Kingdom) Ultimate Speed / Mike Brown	26	(United Kingdom) Matt Manderson	PA	Aston Martin V12 Vantage GT3	Aston Martin 6.0L V12	5, 7
(United Kingdom) Tolman Motorsport	32	(United Kingdom) Ian Stinton	PA	Ginetta G55 GT3	Ginetta 4.3L V8	All
(United Kingdom) Tolman Motorsport	32	(United Kingdom) Mike Simpson	PA	Ginetta G55 GT3	Ginetta 4.3L V8	All
(United Kingdom) Tolman Motorsport	56	(United Kingdom) David Pattison	PA	Ginetta G55 GT3	Ginetta 4.3L V8	1–5, 7–8
(United Kingdom) Tolman Motorsport	56	(United Kingdom) Luke Davenport	PA	Ginetta G55 GT3	Ginetta 4.3L V8	1–5, 7–8
(Germany) AMG - Team Black Falcon	57	(United Kingdom) Oliver Morley	PA	Mercedes-AMG GT3	Mercedes 4.0 L V8	6
(Germany) AMG - Team Black Falcon	57	(Spain) Daniel Juncadella	PA	Mercedes-AMG GT3	Mercedes 4.0 L V8	6
(Germany) AMG - Team Black Falcon	58	(Saudi Arabia) Abdulaziz Bin Turki Al Faisal	S	Mercedes-AMG GT3	Mercedes 4.0 L V8	6
(Germany) AMG - Team Black Falcon	58	(Spain) Miguel Toril	S	Mercedes-AMG GT3	Mercedes 4.0 L V8	6
(United Kingdom) Black Bull Ecurie Ecosse	79	(United Kingdom) Alasdair McCaig	PA	McLaren 650S GT3	McLaren 3.8L Turbo V8	All
(United Kingdom) Black Bull Ecurie Ecosse	79	(United Kingdom) Rob Bell	PA	McLaren 650S GT3	McLaren 3.8L Turbo V8	All
(United Kingdom) Team ABBA with Rollcentre Racing	88	(United Kingdom) Martin Short	AA	BMW Z4 GT3	BMW 4.4L V8	1–6,8
(United Kingdom) Team ABBA with Rollcentre Racing	88	(United Kingdom) Richard Neary	AA	BMW Z4 GT3	BMW 4.4L V8	1–6,8

Icon	Class
PA	Pro-Am
S	Silver Cup
AA	Am-Am

=== GT4 ===
Team	No.	Drivers	Class		Chassis	Engine	Rounds
Team	No.	Drivers	Car	Driver	Chassis	Engine	Rounds
(United Kingdom) Century Motorsport	40	(Republic of Ireland) Sean Byrne	PA	GT4	Ginetta G55 GT4	Ford Cyclone 3.7L V6	All
(United Kingdom) Century Motorsport	40	(Norway) Aleksander Schjerpen	PA	GT4	Ginetta G55 GT4	Ford Cyclone 3.7L V6	All
(United Kingdom) Century Motorsport	73	(United Kingdom) Nathan Freke	PA	GT4	Ginetta G55 GT4	Ford Cyclone 3.7L V6	All
(United Kingdom) Century Motorsport	73	(United Kingdom) Anna Walewska	PA	GT4	Ginetta G55 GT4	Ford Cyclone 3.7L V6	All
(United Kingdom) / Generation AMR Macmillan Racing (Note: Car No. 42 entered as Generation AMR Macmillan Racing and car No. 44 entered as Generation AMR SuperRacing.); (United Kingdom) / Generation AMR SuperRacing	42	(United Kingdom) Jack Mitchell	S	GT4	Aston Martin V8 Vantage GT4	Aston Martin 4.7L V8	All
(United Kingdom) / Generation AMR Macmillan Racing; (United Kingdom) / Generation AMR SuperRacing	42	(United Kingdom) Matthew Graham	S	GT4	Aston Martin V8 Vantage GT4	Aston Martin 4.7L V8	All
(United Kingdom) / Generation AMR Macmillan Racing; (United Kingdom) / Generation AMR SuperRacing	44	(United Kingdom) Jamie Chadwick	S	GT4	Aston Martin V8 Vantage GT4	Aston Martin 4.7L V8	1–2
(United Kingdom) / Generation AMR Macmillan Racing; (United Kingdom) / Generation AMR SuperRacing	44	(United Kingdom) Matthew George	S	GT4	Aston Martin V8 Vantage GT4	Aston Martin 4.7L V8	1–2
(United Kingdom) / Generation AMR Macmillan Racing; (United Kingdom) / Generation AMR SuperRacing	44	(United Kingdom) James Holder	PA	GT4	Aston Martin V8 Vantage GT4	Aston Martin 4.7L V8	3–8
(United Kingdom) / Generation AMR Macmillan Racing; (United Kingdom) / Generation AMR SuperRacing	44	(United Kingdom) Matthew George	PA	GT4	Aston Martin V8 Vantage GT4	Aston Martin 4.7L V8	3–8
(United Kingdom) RCIB Insurance Racing	45	(United Kingdom) Jordan Stilp	S	GT4	Ginetta G55 GT4	Ford Cyclone 3.7L V6	All
(United Kingdom) RCIB Insurance Racing	45	(United Kingdom) William Phillips	S	GT4	Ginetta G55 GT4	Ford Cyclone 3.7L V6	All
(United Kingdom) RCIB Insurance Racing	75	(Republic of Ireland) Robert Barrable	S	GT4	Ginetta G55 GT4	Ford Cyclone 3.7L V6	1–6
(United Kingdom) RCIB Insurance Racing	75	(United Kingdom) Wilson Thompson	S	GT4	Ginetta G55 GT4	Ford Cyclone 3.7L V6	1–2
(United Kingdom) RCIB Insurance Racing	75	(United Kingdom) Aaron Mason	S	GT4	Ginetta G55 GT4	Ford Cyclone 3.7L V6	3–6
(United Kingdom) JW Bird Motorsport	47	(United Kingdom) Jake Giddings	PA	GT4	Aston Martin V8 Vantage GT4	Aston Martin 4.7L V8	All
(United Kingdom) JW Bird Motorsport	47	(United Kingdom) Kieran Griffin	PA	GT4	Aston Martin V8 Vantage GT4	Aston Martin 4.7L V8	All
(United Kingdom) Fox Motorsport	48	(United Kingdom) Sam Webster	PA	GT4	Ginetta G55 GT4	Ford Cyclone 3.7L V6	6
(United Kingdom) Fox Motorsport	48	(United Kingdom) Jamie Stanley	PA	GT4	Ginetta G55 GT4	Ford Cyclone 3.7L V6	6
(United Kingdom) PMW Expo Racing/Optimum Motorsport	50	(United Kingdom) Graham Johnson	PA	GT4	Ginetta G55 GT4	Ford Cyclone 3.7L V6	All
(United Kingdom) PMW Expo Racing/Optimum Motorsport	50	(United Kingdom) Mike Robinson	PA	GT4	Ginetta G55 GT4	Ford Cyclone 3.7L V6	All
(United Kingdom) Lanan Racing	51	(United Kingdom) Alex Reed	S	GT4	Ginetta G55 GT4	Ford Cyclone 3.7L V6	All
(United Kingdom) Lanan Racing	51	(United Kingdom) Joey Foster	S	GT4	Ginetta G55 GT4	Ford Cyclone 3.7L V6	All
(United Kingdom) Black Bull Ecurie Ecosse	59	(United Kingdom) Ciaran Haggerty	S	GT4	McLaren 570S GT4	McLaren 3.8L Turbo V8	All
(United Kingdom) Black Bull Ecurie Ecosse	59	(United Kingdom) Sandy Mitchell	S	GT4	McLaren 570S GT4	McLaren 3.8L Turbo V8	All
(United Kingdom) Ebor GT	60	(United Kingdom) Abbie Eaton	PA	GT4	Maserati GranTurismo MC GT4	Maserati 4.7L V8	All
(United Kingdom) Ebor GT	60	(United Kingdom) Marcus Hoggarth	PA	GT4	Maserati GranTurismo MC GT4	Maserati 4.7L V8	All
(United Kingdom) Ebor GT	135	(Switzerland) Mauro Calamia	P	GT4	Maserati GranTurismo MC GT4	Maserati 4.7L V8	5–6 (Note: Competing in the GT4 European Series. Ineligible for British GT4 points.)
(United Kingdom) Ebor GT	135	(Italy) Giuseppe Fascicolo	P	GT4	Maserati GranTurismo MC GT4	Maserati 4.7L V8	5–6
(United Kingdom) Simpson Motorsport	66	(United Kingdom) Nick Jones	PA	GT4	Ginetta G55 GT4	Ford Cyclone 3.7L V6	1–4
(United Kingdom) Simpson Motorsport	66	(United Kingdom) Scott Malvern	PA	GT4	Ginetta G55 GT4	Ford Cyclone 3.7L V6	1–4
(United Kingdom) Simpson Motorsport	66	(United Kingdom) Nick Jones	PA	GT4	Porsche Cayman GT4 Clubsport	Porsche 3.8L flat-6	5–8
(United Kingdom) Simpson Motorsport	66	(United Kingdom) Scott Malvern	PA	GT4	Porsche Cayman GT4 Clubsport	Porsche 3.8L flat-6	5–8
(United Kingdom) GPRM	86	(United Kingdom) Stefan Hodgetts	PA	GT4	Toyota GT86 GT4	Toyota 2.0L Flat-4	1, 5
(United Kingdom) GPRM	86	(United Kingdom) Ollie Chadwick	PA	GT4	Toyota GT86 GT4	Toyota 2.0L Flat-4	1, 5
(United Kingdom) Stratton Motorsport	70	(United Kingdom) Robin Shute	S	GT4	Lotus Evora GT4	Lotus 3.5L V6	1
(United Kingdom) Stratton Motorsport	70	(United States) Will Hunholz	S	GT4	Lotus Evora GT4	Lotus 3.5L V6	1
(United Kingdom) Stratton Motorsport	71	(United Kingdom) David Tinn	AA	GT4	Aston Martin V8 Vantage GT4	Aston Martin 4.7L V8	1, 5–6
(United Kingdom) Stratton Motorsport	71	(United Kingdom) Robin Marriott	AA	GT4	Aston Martin V8 Vantage GT4	Aston Martin 4.7L V8	1, 5–6
(Netherlands) V8 Racing International	101	(Netherlands) Marcel Nooren	P	GT4	Chevrolet Camaro GT4	Chevrolet 3.6L LFX V6	5
(Netherlands) V8 Racing International	101	(Netherlands) Jelle Beelen	P	GT4	Chevrolet Camaro GT4	Chevrolet 3.6L LFX V6	5
(Netherlands) V8 Racing International	102	(Netherlands) Luc Braams	P	GT4	Chevrolet Camaro GT4	Chevrolet 3.6L LFX V6	5
(Netherlands) V8 Racing International	102	(Netherlands) Duncan Huisman	P	GT4	Chevrolet Camaro GT4	Chevrolet 3.6L LFX V6	5
(Netherlands) V8 Racing International	104	(Netherlands) Marcel Nooren	P	GT4	Aston Martin V8 Vantage GT4	Aston Martin 4.7L V8	6
(Netherlands) V8 Racing International	104	(Netherlands) Jelle Beelen	P	GT4	Aston Martin V8 Vantage GT4	Aston Martin 4.7L V8	6
(Netherlands) V8 Racing International	105	(Netherlands) Luc Braams	P	GT4	Aston Martin V8 Vantage GT4	Aston Martin 4.7L V8	6
(Netherlands) V8 Racing International	105	(Netherlands) Duncan Huisman	P	GT4	Aston Martin V8 Vantage GT4	Aston Martin 4.7L V8	6
(Netherlands) Las Moras Racing Team	103	(Netherlands) Liesette Braams	Am	GT4	BMW M3 GT4	BMW 4.0L V8	5
(Netherlands) Las Moras Racing Team	103	(Netherlands) Jelle Beelen	Am	GT4	BMW M3 GT4	BMW 4.0L V8	5
(Belgium) Street Art Racing	107	(France) Jérôme Demay	Am	GT4	Aston Martin V8 Vantage GT4	Aston Martin 4.7L V8	5–6
(Belgium) Street Art Racing	107	(Belgium) Albert Bloem	Am	GT4	Aston Martin V8 Vantage GT4	Aston Martin 4.7L V8	5–6
(Netherlands) Racing Team Holland by Ekris Motorsport	108	(Netherlands) Simon Knap	P	GT4	Ekris M4 GT4	BMW 3.0L twin turbo I6	5–6
(Netherlands) Racing Team Holland by Ekris Motorsport	108	(Netherlands) Rob Severs	P	GT4	Ekris M4 GT4	BMW 3.0L twin turbo I6	5–6
(Netherlands) Racing Team Holland by Ekris Motorsport	109	(Netherlands) Ricardo van der Ende	P	GT4	Ekris M4 GT4	BMW 3.0L twin turbo I6	5–6
(Netherlands) Racing Team Holland by Ekris Motorsport	109	(Netherlands) Bernhard van Oranje	P	GT4	Ekris M4 GT4	BMW 3.0L twin turbo I6	5–6
(Bulgaria) Sofia Car Motorsport	111	(Germany) Hendrik Still	P	GT4	Sin R1 GT4	SIN 6.2 L V8	5
(Bulgaria) Sofia Car Motorsport	111	(United Kingdom) Michael Epps	P	GT4	Sin R1 GT4	SIN 6.2 L V8	5
(Bulgaria) Sofia Car Motorsport	111	(Netherlands) Tim Coronel	P	GT4	Sin R1 GT4	SIN 6.2 L V8	6
(Bulgaria) Sofia Car Motorsport	111	(Netherlands) Pieter-Christiaan van Oranje	P	GT4	Sin R1 GT4	SIN 6.2 L V8	6
(Germany) / RYS Team KTM (Note: Car No. 114 entered as RYS Team KTM, car No. 124 entered as RYS Team Holinger, car No. 134 entered as RYS Team KISKA, car No. 144 entered as RYS Team WP, car No. 154 entered as RYS Team Pankl, car No. 164 entered as RYS Team InterNetX, car No. 174 entered as RYS Team True Racing and car No. 184 entered as RYS Team Hohenberg.); (Germany) / RYS Team Holinger; (Germany) / RYS Team KISKA; (Germany) / RYS Team WP; (Germany) / RYS Team Pankl; (Germany) / RYS Team InterNetX; (Germany) / RYS Team True Racing; (Germany) / RYS Team Hohenberg	114	(Austria) Laura Kraihamer	P	GT4	KTM X-Bow GT4	KTM 2.0 L Audi turbocharged I4	6
(Germany) / RYS Team KTM; (Germany) / RYS Team Holinger; (Germany) / RYS Team KISKA; (Germany) / RYS Team WP; (Germany) / RYS Team Pankl; (Germany) / RYS Team InterNetX; (Germany) / RYS Team True Racing; (Germany) / RYS Team Hohenberg	114	(Belgium) Jamie Vandenbalck	P	GT4	KTM X-Bow GT4	KTM 2.0 L Audi turbocharged I4	6
(Germany) / RYS Team KTM; (Germany) / RYS Team Holinger; (Germany) / RYS Team KISKA; (Germany) / RYS Team WP; (Germany) / RYS Team Pankl; (Germany) / RYS Team InterNetX; (Germany) / RYS Team True Racing; (Germany) / RYS Team Hohenberg	124	(Germany) Lennart Marioneck	P	GT4	KTM X-Bow GT4	KTM 2.0 L Audi turbocharged I4	6
(Germany) / RYS Team KTM; (Germany) / RYS Team Holinger; (Germany) / RYS Team KISKA; (Germany) / RYS Team WP; (Germany) / RYS Team Pankl; (Germany) / RYS Team InterNetX; (Germany) / RYS Team True Racing; (Germany) / RYS Team Hohenberg	124	(Germany) Tim Stupple	P	GT4	KTM X-Bow GT4	KTM 2.0 L Audi turbocharged I4	6
(Germany) / RYS Team KTM; (Germany) / RYS Team Holinger; (Germany) / RYS Team KISKA; (Germany) / RYS Team WP; (Germany) / RYS Team Pankl; (Germany) / RYS Team InterNetX; (Germany) / RYS Team True Racing; (Germany) / RYS Team Hohenberg	134	(Australia) Caitlin Wood	P	GT4	KTM X-Bow GT4	KTM 2.0 L Audi turbocharged I4	6
(Germany) / RYS Team KTM; (Germany) / RYS Team Holinger; (Germany) / RYS Team KISKA; (Germany) / RYS Team WP; (Germany) / RYS Team Pankl; (Germany) / RYS Team InterNetX; (Germany) / RYS Team True Racing; (Germany) / RYS Team Hohenberg	134	(Germany) Maximilian Voelker	P	GT4	KTM X-Bow GT4	KTM 2.0 L Audi turbocharged I4	6
(Germany) / RYS Team KTM; (Germany) / RYS Team Holinger; (Germany) / RYS Team KISKA; (Germany) / RYS Team WP; (Germany) / RYS Team Pankl; (Germany) / RYS Team InterNetX; (Germany) / RYS Team True Racing; (Germany) / RYS Team Hohenberg	144	(United Kingdom) Rebecca Jackson	P	GT4	KTM X-Bow GT4	KTM 2.0 L Audi turbocharged I4	6
(Germany) / RYS Team KTM; (Germany) / RYS Team Holinger; (Germany) / RYS Team KISKA; (Germany) / RYS Team WP; (Germany) / RYS Team Pankl; (Germany) / RYS Team InterNetX; (Germany) / RYS Team True Racing; (Germany) / RYS Team Hohenberg	144	(Denmark) Thomas Krebs	P	GT4	KTM X-Bow GT4	KTM 2.0 L Audi turbocharged I4	6
(Germany) / RYS Team KTM; (Germany) / RYS Team Holinger; (Germany) / RYS Team KISKA; (Germany) / RYS Team WP; (Germany) / RYS Team Pankl; (Germany) / RYS Team InterNetX; (Germany) / RYS Team True Racing; (Germany) / RYS Team Hohenberg	154	(Finland) Marko Helistekangas	P	GT4	KTM X-Bow GT4	KTM 2.0 L Audi turbocharged I4	6
(Germany) / RYS Team KTM; (Germany) / RYS Team Holinger; (Germany) / RYS Team KISKA; (Germany) / RYS Team WP; (Germany) / RYS Team Pankl; (Germany) / RYS Team InterNetX; (Germany) / RYS Team True Racing; (Germany) / RYS Team Hohenberg	154	(Germany) Doreen Seidel	P	GT4	KTM X-Bow GT4	KTM 2.0 L Audi turbocharged I4	6
(Germany) / RYS Team KTM; (Germany) / RYS Team Holinger; (Germany) / RYS Team KISKA; (Germany) / RYS Team WP; (Germany) / RYS Team Pankl; (Germany) / RYS Team InterNetX; (Germany) / RYS Team True Racing; (Germany) / RYS Team Hohenberg	164	(Germany) Immanuel Vinke	P	GT4	KTM X-Bow GT4	KTM 2.0 L Audi turbocharged I4	6
(Germany) / RYS Team KTM; (Germany) / RYS Team Holinger; (Germany) / RYS Team KISKA; (Germany) / RYS Team WP; (Germany) / RYS Team Pankl; (Germany) / RYS Team InterNetX; (Germany) / RYS Team True Racing; (Germany) / RYS Team Hohenberg	164	(New Zealand) Chris Vlok	P	GT4	KTM X-Bow GT4	KTM 2.0 L Audi turbocharged I4	6
(Germany) / RYS Team KTM; (Germany) / RYS Team Holinger; (Germany) / RYS Team KISKA; (Germany) / RYS Team WP; (Germany) / RYS Team Pankl; (Germany) / RYS Team InterNetX; (Germany) / RYS Team True Racing; (Germany) / RYS Team Hohenberg	174	(Switzerland) Cédric Freiburghaus	P	GT4	KTM X-Bow GT4	KTM 2.0 L Audi turbocharged I4	6
(Germany) / RYS Team KTM; (Germany) / RYS Team Holinger; (Germany) / RYS Team KISKA; (Germany) / RYS Team WP; (Germany) / RYS Team Pankl; (Germany) / RYS Team InterNetX; (Germany) / RYS Team True Racing; (Germany) / RYS Team Hohenberg	174	(Norway) Anna Rathe	P	GT4	KTM X-Bow GT4	KTM 2.0 L Audi turbocharged I4	6
(Germany) / RYS Team KTM; (Germany) / RYS Team Holinger; (Germany) / RYS Team KISKA; (Germany) / RYS Team WP; (Germany) / RYS Team Pankl; (Germany) / RYS Team InterNetX; (Germany) / RYS Team True Racing; (Germany) / RYS Team Hohenberg	184	(Poland) Maciej Dreszer	P	GT4	KTM X-Bow GT4	KTM 2.0 L Audi turbocharged I4	6
(Germany) / RYS Team KTM; (Germany) / RYS Team Holinger; (Germany) / RYS Team KISKA; (Germany) / RYS Team WP; (Germany) / RYS Team Pankl; (Germany) / RYS Team InterNetX; (Germany) / RYS Team True Racing; (Germany) / RYS Team Hohenberg	184	(Norway) Mads Siljehaug	P	GT4	KTM X-Bow GT4	KTM 2.0 L Audi turbocharged I4	6
(Germany) PROsport Performance	118	(Germany) Peter Terting	P	GT4	Porsche Cayman PRO4 GT4	Porsche 3.8L flat-6	5–6
(Germany) PROsport Performance	118	(Germany) Jörg Viebahn	P	GT4	Porsche Cayman PRO4 GT4	Porsche 3.8L flat-6	5–6
(Germany) PROsport Performance	119	(Denmark) Nicolaj Møller Madsen	P	GT4	Porsche Cayman PRO4 GT4	Porsche 3.8L flat-6	5–6
(Germany) PROsport Performance	119	(Germany) Andreas Patzelt	P	GT4	Porsche Cayman PRO4 GT4	Porsche 3.8L flat-6	5–6
(Germany) PROsport Performance	120	(United Kingdom) Riki Christodoulou	Am	GT4	Porsche Cayman PRO4 GT4	Porsche 3.8L flat-6	5
(Germany) PROsport Performance	120	(Germany) Mike Hansch	Am	GT4	Porsche Cayman PRO4 GT4	Porsche 3.8L flat-6	5
(Germany) PROsport Performance	120	(Germany) Hendrik Still	P	GT4	Porsche Cayman PRO4 GT4	Porsche 3.8L flat-6	6
(Germany) PROsport Performance	120	(Germany) Carsten Struwe	P	GT4	Porsche Cayman PRO4 GT4	Porsche 3.8L flat-6	6
(Germany) PROsport Performance	121	(United Kingdom) Riki Christodoulou	Am	GT4	Porsche Cayman PRO4 GT4	Porsche 3.8L flat-6	6
(Germany) PROsport Performance	121	(Germany) Mike Hansch	Am	GT4	Porsche Cayman PRO4 GT4	Porsche 3.8L flat-6	6
(Italy) V-Action Racing Team	125	(Finland) Juuso-Matti Pajuranta	P	GT4	Maserati GranTurismo MC GT4	Maserati 4.7L V8	6
(Italy) V-Action Racing Team	125	(Portugal) Jorge Rodrigues	P	GT4	Maserati GranTurismo MC GT4	Maserati 4.7L V8	6
(Germany) Allied Racing	128	(Germany) Jan Kasperlik	Am	GT4	BMW M3 GT4	BMW 4.0L V8	5–6
(Germany) Allied Racing	128	(Germany) Mike Hansch	Am	GT4	BMW M3 GT4	BMW 4.0L V8	5–6
(Germany) Allied Racing	129	(San Marino) Paolo Meloni	Am	GT4	BMW M3 GT4	BMW 4.0L V8	6
(Germany) Allied Racing	129	(Italy) Massimilliano Tresoldi	Am	GT4	BMW M3 GT4	BMW 4.0L V8	6
(United Kingdom) Brookspeed	140	(United Kingdom) Steven Liquorish	Am	GT4	Porsche Cayman PRO4 GT4	Porsche 3.8L flat-6	5–6
(United Kingdom) Brookspeed	140	(United Kingdom) Graeme Mundy	Am	GT4	Porsche Cayman PRO4 GT4	Porsche 3.8L flat-6	5–6
(Italy) Villorba Corse	150	(Poland) Antoni Chodzen	Am	GT4	Maserati GranTurismo MC GT4	Maserati 4.7L V8	5–6
(Italy) Villorba Corse	150	(Poland) Piotr Chodzen	Am	GT4	Maserati GranTurismo MC GT4	Maserati 4.7L V8	5–6
(Italy) Villorba Corse	166	(Poland) Łukasz Habaj	Inv	GT4	Maserati GranTurismo MC GT4	Maserati 4.7L V8	5
(Italy) Villorba Corse	166	(Poland) Lucasz Kreski	Inv	GT4	Maserati GranTurismo MC GT4	Maserati 4.7L V8	5
(Italy) Villorba Corse	190	(Italy) Luca Anselmi	P	GT4	Maserati GranTurismo MC GT4	Maserati 4.7L V8	5–6
(Italy) Villorba Corse	190	(Italy) Giorgio Sernagiotto	P	GT4	Maserati GranTurismo MC GT4	Maserati 4.7L V8	5
(Italy) Villorba Corse	190	(France) Michael Blanchemain	P	GT4	Maserati GranTurismo MC GT4	Maserati 4.7L V8	6
(Belgium) Delahaye Racing Team	158	(France) Pierre-Etienne Bordet	Am	GT4	Porsche Cayman PRO4 GT4	Porsche 3.8L flat-6	6
(Belgium) Delahaye Racing Team	158	(France) Alexandre Viron	Am	GT4	Porsche Cayman PRO4 GT4	Porsche 3.8L flat-6	6
(Poland) eSKY INVENTO Racing Team	169	(Poland) Lucasz Kreski	Am	GT4	Maserati GranTurismo MC GT4	Maserati 4.7L V8	6
(Poland) eSKY INVENTO Racing Team	169	(Poland) Maciej Marcinkiewicz	Am	GT4	Maserati GranTurismo MC GT4	Maserati 4.7L V8	6
(Italy) Autorlando Sport	176	(Italy) Giuseppe Ghezzi	Am	GT4	Porsche 997 GT4	Porsche 4.0L flat-6	5–6
(Italy) Autorlando Sport	176	(Italy) Alessandro Giovanelli	Am	GT4	Porsche 997 GT4	Porsche 4.0L flat-6	5–6
(United Kingdom) Pall-Ex Slidesport Motorsport	199	(United Kingdom) David Fairbrother	Am	GT4	Porsche Cayman PRO4 GT4	Porsche 3.8L flat-6	6
(United Kingdom) Pall-Ex Slidesport Motorsport	199	(United Kingdom) Wayne Marrs	Am	GT4	Porsche Cayman PRO4 GT4	Porsche 3.8L flat-6	6
(United Kingdom) Beechdean AMR	407	(United Kingdom) Jordan Albert	S	GT4	Aston Martin V8 Vantage GT4	Aston Martin 4.7L V8	All
(United Kingdom) Beechdean AMR	407	(United Kingdom) Jack Bartholomew	S	GT4	Aston Martin V8 Vantage GT4	Aston Martin 4.7L V8	All
(United Kingdom) Beechdean AMR	408	(United Kingdom) Jamie Chadwick	PA	GT4	Aston Martin V8 Vantage GT4	Aston Martin 4.7L V8	6–8
(United Kingdom) Beechdean AMR	408	(United Kingdom) Paul Hollywood	PA	GT4	Aston Martin V8 Vantage GT4	Aston Martin 4.7L V8	6–8

Icon	Class
Drivers
P	Pro
PA	Pro-Am
S	Silver Cup
Am	Am
AA	Am-Am
Inv	Invitation Class
Car
GT4	British GT4 Class
GT4	GT4 Europe Class

== Race calendar ==
The 2016 calendar was announced on 27 October 2015. Brands Hatch hosted the opening round after being held at Oulton Park every year since 2005, which moves to May. All races except Belgian round at Spa, were held in the United Kingdom.

Round	Circuit	Date	Length	Pole position	GT3 winner	GT4 winner
1	Brands Hatch GP	17 April	120 mins	No. 31 Team Parker Racing	No. 17 TF Sport	No. 50 PMW Expo Racing / Optimum Motorsport
1	Brands Hatch GP	17 April	120 mins	(United Kingdom) Rick Parfitt, Jr. (United Kingdom) Seb Morris	(United Kingdom) Jonathan Adam (United Kingdom) Derek Johnston	(United Kingdom) Graham Johnson (United Kingdom) Mike Robinson
2	Rockingham	1 May	120 mins	No. 17 TF Sport	No. 17 TF Sport	No. 407 Beechdean AMR
2	Rockingham	1 May	120 mins	(United Kingdom) Jonathan Adam (United Kingdom) Derek Johnston	(United Kingdom) Jonathan Adam (United Kingdom) Derek Johnston	(United Kingdom) Jordan Albert (United Kingdom) Jack Bartholomew
3	Oulton Park	30 May	60 mins	No. 33 Barwell Motorsport	No. 6 Barwell Motorsport	No. 50 PMW Expo Racing / Optimum Motorsport
3	Oulton Park	30 May	60 mins	(United Kingdom) Phil Keen (United Kingdom) Jon Minshaw	(United Kingdom) Liam Griffin (United Kingdom) Adam Carroll	(United Kingdom) Graham Johnson (United Kingdom) Mike Robinson
4	Oulton Park	30 May	60 mins	No. 31 Team Parker Racing	No. 31 Team Parker Racing	No. 50 PMW Expo Racing / Optimum Motorsport
4	Oulton Park	30 May	60 mins	(United Kingdom) Rick Parfitt Jr. (United Kingdom) Seb Morris	(United Kingdom) Rick Parfitt Jr. (United Kingdom) Seb Morris	(United Kingdom) Graham Johnson (United Kingdom) Mike Robinson
5	Silverstone Circuit	12 June	180 mins	No. 31 Team Parker Racing	No. 33 Barwell Motorsport	No. 75 RCIB Insurance Racing
5	Silverstone Circuit	12 June	180 mins	(United Kingdom) Rick Parfitt Jr. (United Kingdom) Seb Morris	(United Kingdom) Phil Keen (United Kingdom) Jon Minshaw	(Republic of Ireland) Robert Barrable (United Kingdom) Aaron Mason
6	Spa-Francorchamps	9 July	120 mins	No. 31 Team Parker Racing	No. 11 TF Sport	No. 51 Lanan Racing
6	Spa-Francorchamps	9 July	120 mins	(United Kingdom) Rick Parfitt Jr. (United Kingdom) Seb Morris	(United Kingdom) Jon Barnes (United Kingdom) Mark Farmer	(United Kingdom) Alex Reed (United Kingdom) Joey Foster
7	Snetterton	7 August	60 mins	No. 11 TF Sport	No. 33 Barwell Motorsport	No. 59 Black Bull Ecurie Ecosse
7	Snetterton	7 August	60 mins	(United Kingdom) Jon Barnes (United Kingdom) Mark Farmer	(United Kingdom) Phil Keen (United Kingdom) Jon Minshaw	(United Kingdom) Ciaran Haggerty (United Kingdom) Sandy Mitchell
8	Snetterton	7 August	60 mins	No. 33 Barwell Motorsport	No. 33 Barwell Motorsport	No. 407 Beechdean AMR
8	Snetterton	7 August	60 mins	(United Kingdom) Phil Keen (United Kingdom) Jon Minshaw	(United Kingdom) Phil Keen (United Kingdom) Jon Minshaw	(United Kingdom) Jack Bartholomew (United Kingdom) Ross Gunn
9	Donington Park	11 September	120 mins	No. 17 TF Sport	No. 79 Black Bull Ecurie Ecosse	No. 59 Black Bull Ecurie Ecosse
9	Donington Park	11 September	120 mins	(United Kingdom) Jonathan Adam (United Kingdom) Derek Johnston	(United Kingdom) Rob Bell (United Kingdom) Alasdair McCaig	(United Kingdom) Ciaran Haggerty (United Kingdom) Sandy Mitchell

== Championship standings ==
Points system

Points are awarded as follows:

Length	1	2	3	4	5	6	7	8	9	10
60 mins	25	18	15	12	10	8	6	4	2	1
60+ mins	37.5	27	22.5	18	15	12	9	6	3	1.5

=== Drivers' championships ===
==== GT3 ====
Pos	Driver	BRH	ROC	OUL		SIL	SPA	SNE		DON	Points
1	(United Kingdom) Jonathan Adam	1	1	5	4	Ret	7	4	2	2	163
1	(United Kingdom) Derek Johnston	1	1	5	4	Ret	7	4	2	2	163
2	(United Kingdom) Phil Keen	Ret	2	7	3	1	6	1	1	Ret	147.5
2	(United Kingdom) Jon Minshaw	Ret	2	7	3	1	6	1	1	Ret	147.5
3	(United Kingdom) Seb Morris	2	10	3	1	Ret	2	3	5	3	143
3	(United Kingdom) Rick Parfitt Jr.	2	10	3	1	Ret	2	3	5	3	143
4	(United Kingdom) Mark Farmer	6	8	4	7	8	1	2	4	Ret	109.5
4	(United Kingdom) Jon Barnes	6	8	4	7	8	1	2	4	Ret	109.5
5	(United Kingdom) Liam Griffin	3	4	1	5	Ret	8	9	Ret	5	98.5
6	(United Kingdom) Joe Osborne	4	9	2	9	2	9	5	3		96
6	(United Kingdom) Lee Mowle	4	9	2	9	2	9	5	3		96
7	(United Kingdom) Rob Bell	7	7	8	2	4	Ret	Ret	Ret	1	95.5
7	(United Kingdom) Alasdair McCaig	7	7	8	2	4	Ret	Ret	Ret	1	95.5
8	(United Kingdom) Adam Carroll		4	1	5	3					75.5
9	(United Kingdom) Andrew Howard	5	3	14	6	9	Ret			4	66.5
10	(United Kingdom) Ross Gunn	5	3	14	6	9	Ret				48.5
11	(United Kingdom) Ross Wylie	Ret	5	12	10	6	12	6	7	Ret	42
11	(United Kingdom) Phil Dryburgh	Ret	5	12	10	6	12	6	7	Ret	42
12	(United Kingdom) Ian Stinton	Ret	Ret	10	Ret	7	10	8	6	7	32.5
12	(United Kingdom) Mike Simpson	Ret	Ret	10	Ret	7	10	8	6	7	32.5
13	(United Kingdom) Ryan Ratcliffe	11	6	13	11	5	Ret				27
13	(United Kingdom) Will Moore	11	6	13	11	5	Ret				27
14	(United Kingdom) Martin Short	9	11	6	8	DSQ	13			6	27
14	(United Kingdom) Richard Neary	9	11	6	8	DSQ	13			6	27
15	(United Kingdom) Alexander Sims					Ret	8	9	Ret	5	23
16	(Italy) Fabio Babini	3									22.5
17	(United Kingdom) Marco Attard					3					22.5
18	(Spain) Miguel Toril						3				22.5
18	(Saudi Arabia) Abdulaziz Bin Turki Al Faisal						3				22.5
19	(United Kingdom) Oliver Morley						4				18
19	(Spain) Daniel Juncadella						4				18
20	(United Kingdom) Rory Butcher									4	18
21	(United Kingdom) Hunter Abbott						5				15
21	(Switzerland) Rolf Ineichen						5				15
22	(United Kingdom) Jody Fannin	8	Ret	11	12	Ret		7	Ret		12
22	(United Kingdom) Peter Littler	8	Ret	11	12	Ret		7	Ret		12
23	(United Kingdom) David Pattison	10	DSQ	9	Ret	10		11	Ret	8	11
23	(United Kingdom) Luke Davenport	10	DSQ	9	Ret	10		11	Ret	8	11
24	(United Kingdom) Mike Brown				11		10	8			5
24	(United Kingdom) Matt Manderson				11		10	8			5
25	(Italy) Michele Beretta						11				0
25	(Germany) "Coach McKansy"						11				0
26	(United Kingdom) Richard Abra					Ret					0
26	(United Kingdom) Mark Poole					Ret					0
27	(United Kingdom) Ian Loggie					Ret	DNS				0
27	(United Kingdom) Callum MacLeod					Ret	DNS				0

Colour	Result
Gold	Winner
Silver	Second place
Bronze	Third place
Green	Points classification
Blue	Non-points classification
Blue	Non-classified finish (NC)
Purple	Retired, not classified (Ret)
Red	Did not qualify (DNQ)
Red	Did not pre-qualify (DNPQ)
Black	Disqualified (DSQ)
White	Did not start (DNS)
White	Withdrew (WD)
White	Race cancelled (C)
Blank	Did not practice (DNP)
Blank	Did not arrive (DNA)
Blank	Excluded (EX)

==== GT4 ====
Pos	Driver	BRH	ROC	OUL		SIL	SPA	SNE		DON	Points
1	(United Kingdom) Graham Johnson	1	DSQ	1	1	Ret	2	5	2	3	165
1	(United Kingdom) Mike Robinson	1	DSQ	1	1	Ret	2	5	2	3	165
2	(United Kingdom) Jack Bartholomew	5	1	6	6	3	8	2	1	6	152
3	(United Kingdom) Sandy Mitchell	6	5	9	4	12	Ret	1	4	1	115.5
3	(United Kingdom) Ciaran Haggarty	6	5	9	4	12	Ret	1	4	1	115.5
4	(United Kingdom) Abbie Eaton	8	4	Ret	2	6	4	7	5	4	106
4	(United Kingdom) Marcus Hoggarth	8	4	Ret	2	6	4	7	5	4	106
5	(United Kingdom) Jack Mitchell	Ret	6	2	7	11	3	3	Ret	2	100.5
5	(United Kingdom) Matthew Graham	Ret	6	2	7	11	3	3	Ret	2	100.5
6	(United Kingdom) Alex Reed	7	3	Ret	10	14	1	4	3	DSQ	97
6	(United Kingdom) Joey Foster	7	3	Ret	10	14	1	4	3	DSQ	97
7	(United Kingdom) Jordan Albert	5	1	6	6	3	8				97
8	(United Kingdom) Nathan Freke	2	DSQ	4	Ret	2	7	9	13	5	92
8	(United Kingdom) Anna Walewska	2	DSQ	4	Ret	2	7	9	13	5	92
9	(United Kingdom) Jordan Stilp	3	8	3	5	8	5	6	7	DSQ	88.5
9	(United Kingdom) William Phillips	3	8	3	5	8	5	6	7	DSQ	88.5
10	(Republic of Ireland) Robert Barrable	Ret	DSQ	8	3	1	6	8	Ret	7	81.5
11	(United Kingdom) Aaron Mason			8	3	1	6	8	Ret	7	81.5
12	(United Kingdom) Ross Gunn							2	1	6	55
13	(Republic of Ireland) Sean Byrne	12	2	Ret	DNS	5	9	13	10	10	47.5
13	(Norway) Aleksander Schjerpen	12	2	Ret	DNS	5	9	13	10	10	47.5
14	(United Kingdom) Matthew George	4	9	7	8	7	11	12	12	12	40
15	(United Kingdom) Jamie Chadwick	4	9				Ret	11	6	11	29
16	(United Kingdom) Scott Malvern	Ret	10	5	9	10	10	14	11	8	22.5
16	(United Kingdom) Nick Jones	Ret	10	5	9	10	10	14	11	8	22.5
17	(United Kingdom) James Holder			7	8	7	11	12	12	12	19
18	(United Kingdom) Matt Nicoll-Jones					4					18
18	(Sweden) Dennis Strandberg					4					18
19	(United Kingdom) Kieran Griffin	9	7	Ret	Ret	13	12	15	9	9	17
19	(United Kingdom) Jake Giddings	9	7	Ret	Ret	13	12	15	9	9	17
20	(United Kingdom) Paul Hollywood						Ret	11	6	11	8
21	(United Kingdom) Bradley Ellis							10	8		5
21	(United Kingdom) Adrian Barwick							10	8		5
22	(United Kingdom) Sam Webster					9				13	3
22	(United Kingdom) Jamie Stanley					9				13	3
23	(United Kingdom) Robin Shute	10									1.5
23	(United States) Will Hunholz	10									1.5
24	(United Kingdom) David Tinn	11					Ret	Ret	14		0
25	(United Kingdom) Robin Marriott	11									0
26	(United Kingdom) Andrew Jarman						Ret	Ret	14		0
27	(United Kingdom) Gavan Kershaw									14	0
27	(United Kingdom) Tim Eakin									14	0
28	(United Kingdom) Stefan Hodgetts	Ret				15				Ret	0
29	(United Kingdom) Ollie Chadwick	Ret				15					0
30	(United Kingdom) Richard Taffinder							Ret	Ret	Ret	0
30	(United Kingdom) Martin Plowman							Ret	Ret	Ret	0
31	(United Kingdom) James Fletcher									Ret	0
32	(United Kingdom) Wilson Thompson	Ret	DSQ								0
