= Rick Parfitt Jr. =

British racing driver (born 1974)

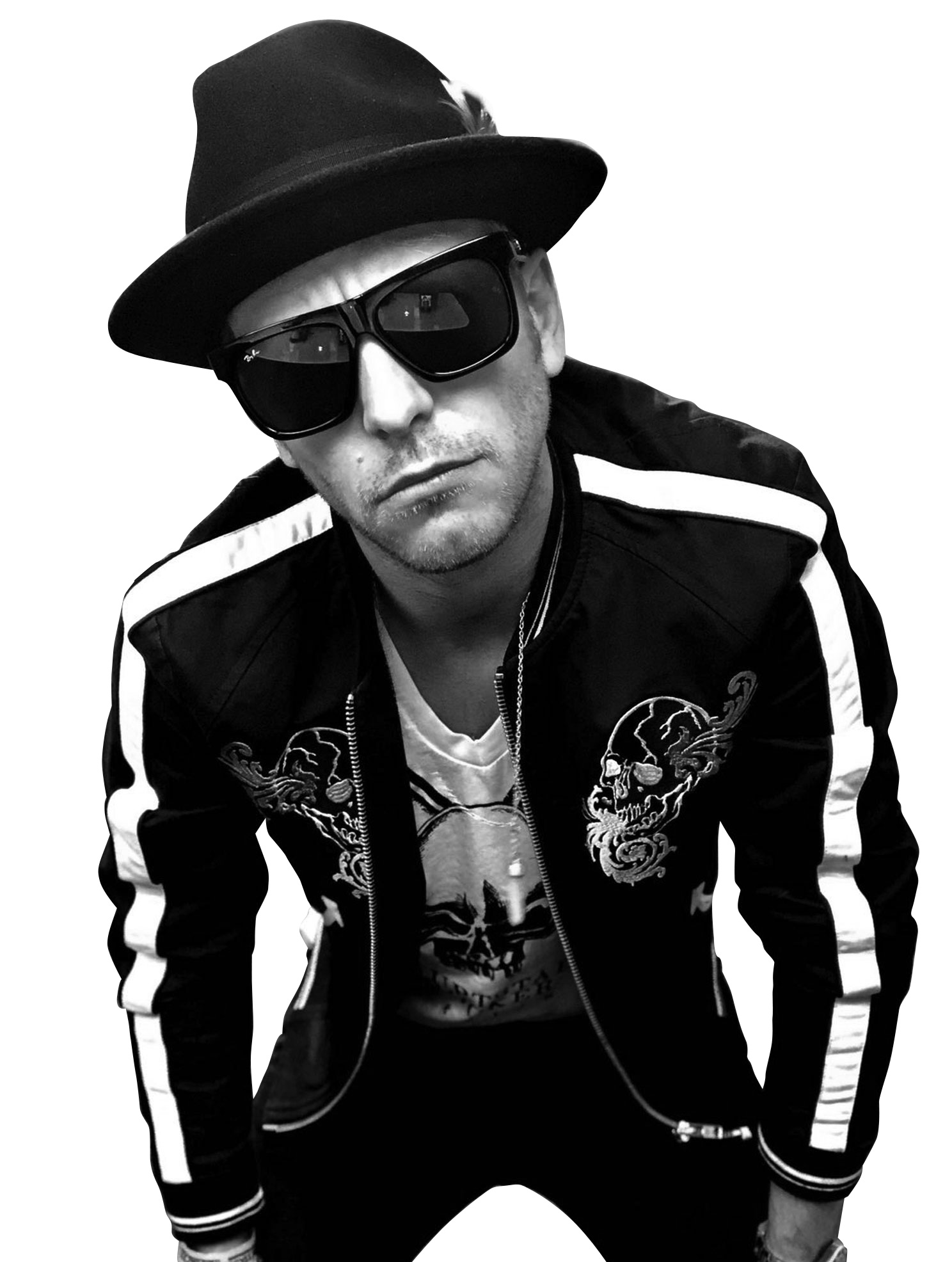
- Born: Richard William Parfitt Jr. 18 October 1974 (age 52); Surrey, England
- Father: Rick Parfitt
- Website: https://rpjband.co.uk/

Rick Parfitt Jr.
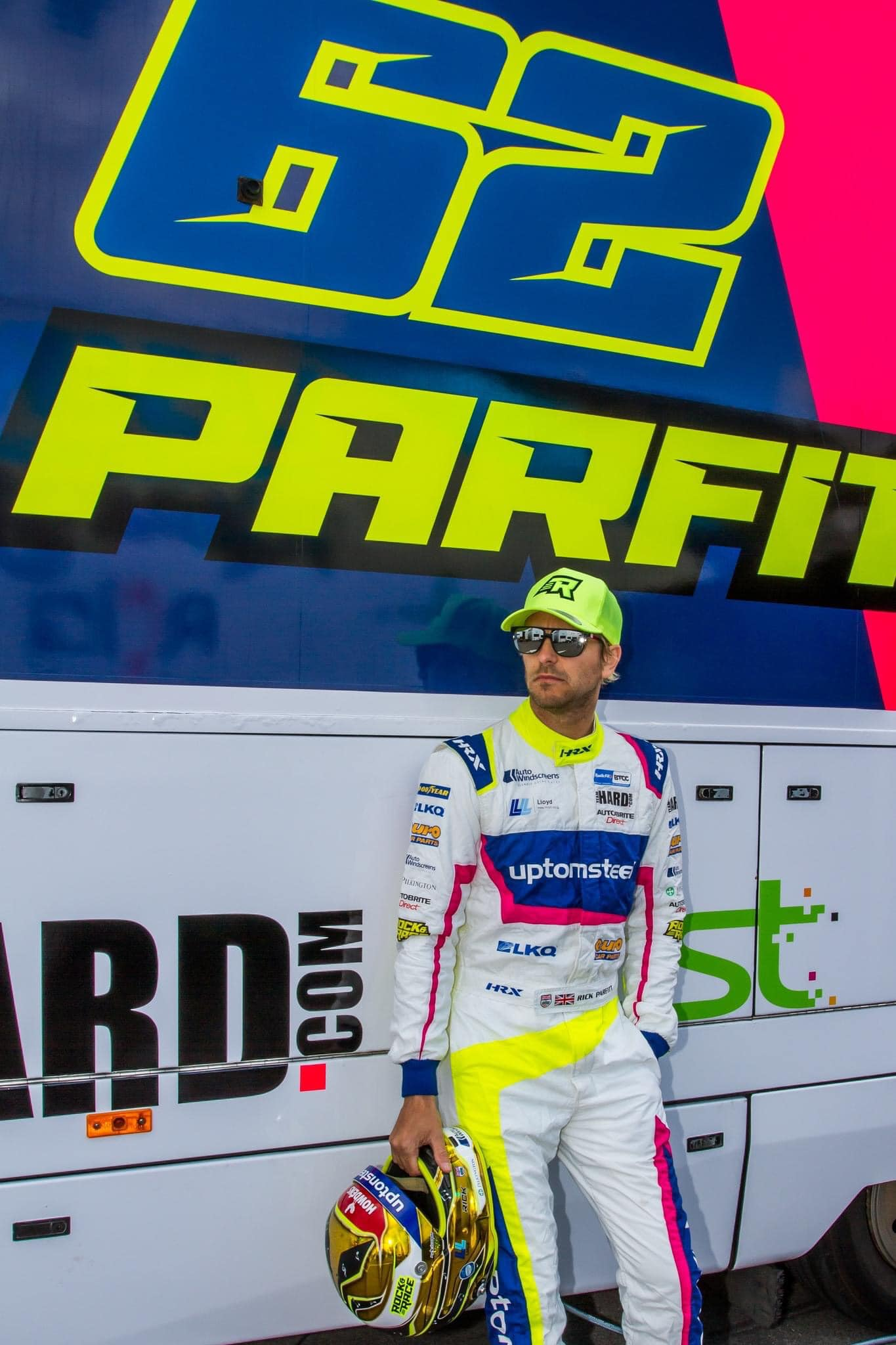
- Rick Parfitt competing in BTCC
- Nationality: (United Kingdom) British

Previous series
- 2013-2019 2018 2013 2012: British GT Championship; Continental Tire SportsCar Challenge; GT4 European Trophy; Ginetta GT5 Challenge

Championship titles
- 2017 2013: British GT Championship - GT3; British GT Championship - GT4

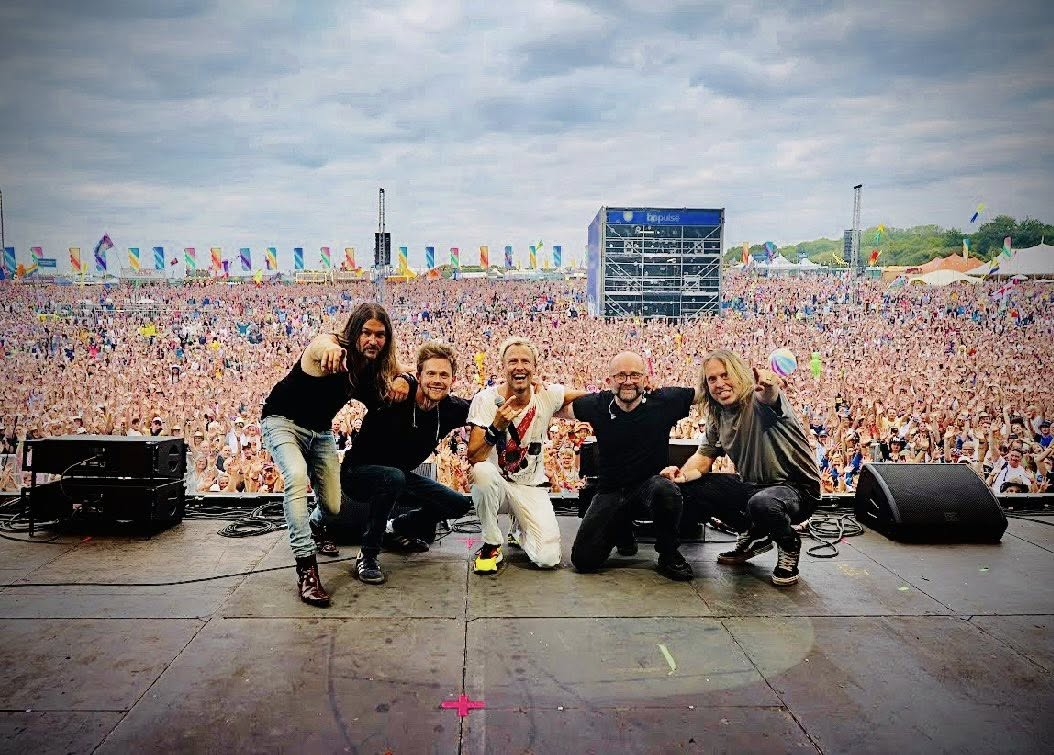
Rick Parfitt Jnr at Carfest 2025.jpg

Richard William Parfitt Jr. (born 18 October 1974) is a British musician (frontman of the RPJ Band) and former racing driver who last competed in the 2022 British Touring Car Championship, driving for UptonSteel with Euro Car Parts Racing. He is the British GT champion in the GT3 and GT4 categories, and made his BTCC debut in 2021.

== The RPJ Band (Rick Parfitt Jnr Band) ==
Parfitt is the founder and frontman of the RPJ Band, a rock and pop group that performs at festivals and major events across the UK and Europe. He has performed at festivals including Isle of Wight Festival, Camp Bestival, Camper Calling and is a regular at CarFest. He has also performed at major sporting events such as Silverstone F1, Moto GP, the NFL Game at Tottenham Hotspur Stadium. His band is made up of UK touring musicians who regularly tour with other artists such as Take That, The Script, Noel Gallagher, Bonnie Tyler, ELO, and Annie Lennox and Robbie Williams.

== Personal life ==
Parfitt is the son of Status Quo musician Rick Parfitt.

Parfitt is a sufferer of Crohn's disease, and has been an advocate for raising awareness of the condition raising money through his charity event 'The Rock Ball'. He is an ambassador for Crohn's and Colitis UK.

Parfitt is the director of corporate event agency https://www.randragency.co.uk/.

Parfitt has supported Nottingham Forest since moving to Nottingham, his wife's hometown.

== Racing career ==
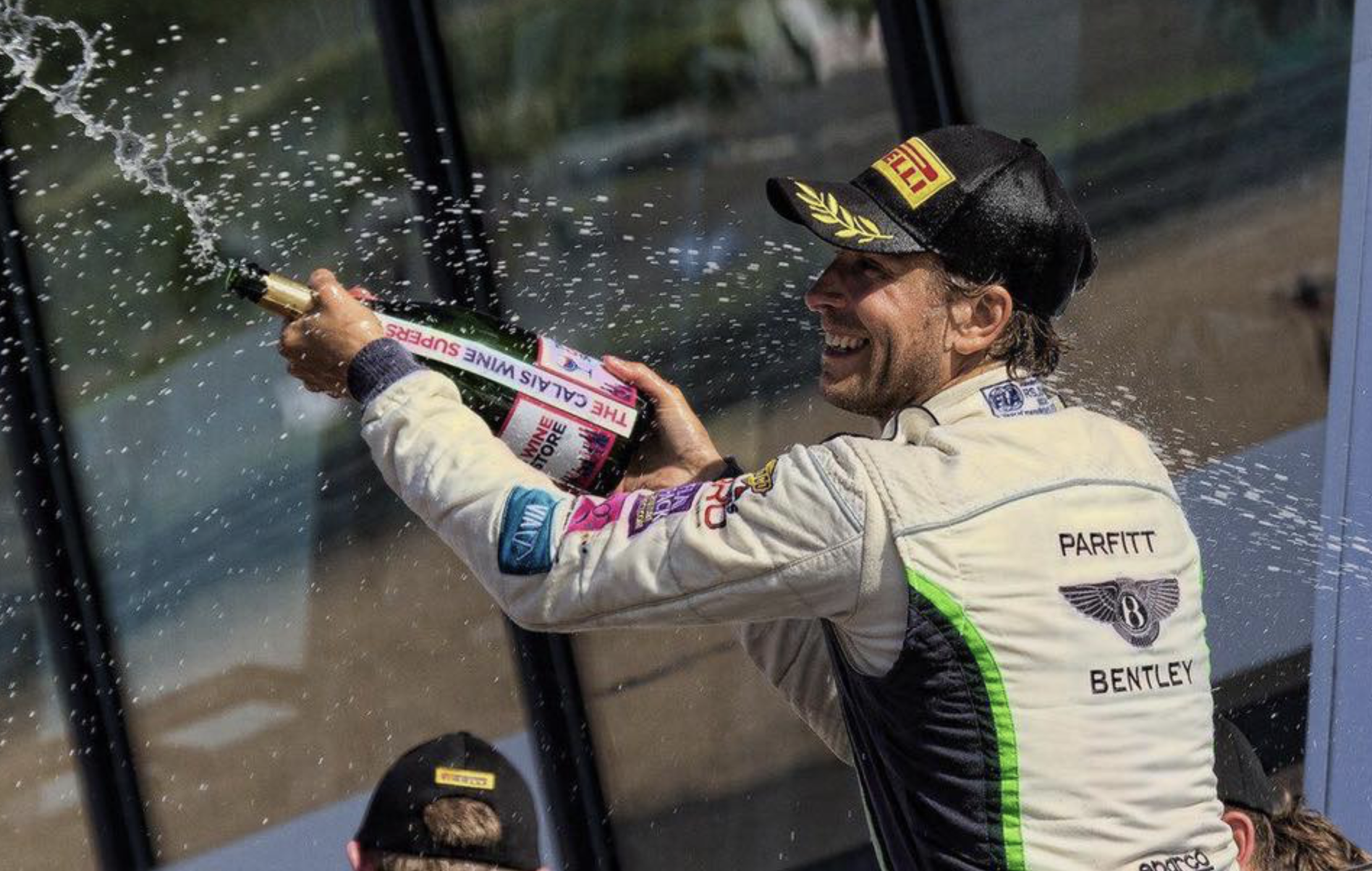
Rick Parfitt Jnr competing in the British GT Championship 2017

Parfitt began racing in 1996, competing in various karting championships both nationally and internationally until 2004.

In 2010, Parfitt competed in the Silverstone 'Celebrity Race', of which he won, before competing in the Ginetta GT5 Challenge in 2012.

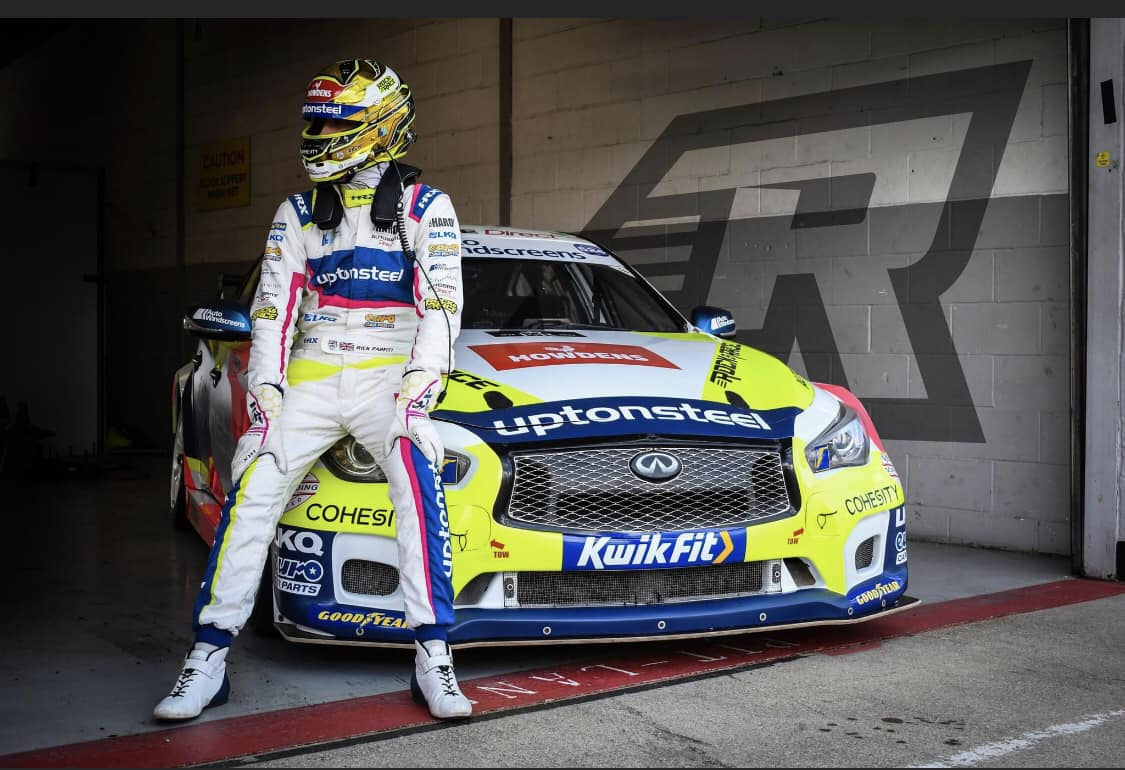
Rick Parfitt Jnr BTCC.

Parfitt stepped up to the British GT Championship in 2013, and competed in the GT4 category until 2015, when he switched to the GT3 category. He won the GT4 category in 2013 with Optimum Motorsport together with Ryan Ratcliffe, and won the GT3 category in 2017 with Bentley Team Parker together with Seb Morris.

Despite having announced that he would step back from racing at the end of 2018, Parfitt and his teammate Seb Morris returned to race in the 2019 British GT Championship.

After a sabbatical in 2020, Parfitt made his British Touring Car Championship debut in 2021, driving for EXCELR8 with TradePriceCars.com in his return to Motorsport in a Hyundai i30N.

== Racing record ==
=== Racing career summary ===
Season	Series	Team	Races	Wins	Poles	F/Laps	Podiums	Points	Position
2012	Ginetta GT5 Challenge - G40	Piranha Motorsport	14	0	0	1	3	224	9th
2013	British GT Championship - GT4	Optimum Motorsport	9	3	0	1	7	173	**1st**
2013	GT4 European Trophy	Optimum Motorsport	1	0	0	0	1	0	NC†
2014	British GT Championship - GT4	Century Motorsport	10	1	2	0	4	121.5	4th
2015	British GT Championship - GT3	Team LNT	9	0	0	0	0	14	18th
2016	British GT Championship - GT3	Team Parker Racing	9	1	4	0	6	143	**3rd**
2017	British GT Championship - GT3	Team Parker Racing	9	3	2	0	4	200	**1st**
2018	British GT Championship - GT3	Team Parker Racing	8	0	0	0	1	60	10th
2018	IMSA SportsCar Challenge - GS	GMG Racing	1	0	0	0	0	12	66th
2019	British GT Championship - GT3	JRM Racing	9	1	0	0	2	58	11th
2021	British Touring Car Championship	EXCELR8 with TradePriceCars.com	27	0	0	0	0	0	27th
2022	British Touring Car Championship	UptonSteel with Euro Car Parts Racing	25	0	0	0	0	0	28th

^{†} As Parfitt was a guest driver, he was ineligible for championship points.

=== Complete British GT Championship results ===
(key) (Races in bold indicate pole position) (Races in italics indicate fastest lap)

Year	Team	Car	Class	1	2	3	4	5	6	7	8	9	10	DC	Points
2013	Optimum Motorsport	Ginetta G50 GT4	GT4	OUL; 1; 21	OUL; 2; 21	ROC; 1 Ret	SIL; 1; 25	SNE; 1; 18	SNE; 2; 19	BRH; 1; 15	ZAN; 1 Ret	ZAN; 2 DNS	DON; 1; 20	1st	173
2014	Century Motorsport	Ginetta G55 GT4	GT4	OUL; 1 Ret	OUL; 2 Ret	**ROC**; **1**; 23	**SIL**; **1**; 24	SNE; 1; 20	SNE; 2; 18	SPA; 1; 26	SPA; 2; 25	BRH; 1; 23	DON; 1; 15	4th	121.5
2015	Team LNT	Ginetta G55 GT3	GT3	OUL; 1; 9	OUL; 2 Ret	ROC; 1 Ret	SIL; 1; 11	SPA; 1 Ret	BRH; 1 Ret	SNE; 1 Ret	SNE; 2; 4	DON; 1; 13		20th	14
2016	Team Parker Racing	Bentley Continental GT3	GT3	**BRH**; **1**; 2	ROC; 1; 10	OUL; 1; 3	**OUL**; **2**; 1	**SIL**; **1** Ret	**SPA**; **1**; 2	SNE; 1; 3	SNE; 2; 5	DON; 1; 3		3rd	143
2017	Team Parker Racing	Bentley Continental GT3	GT3	**OUL**; **1**; 4	**OUL**; **2**; 5	ROC; 1; 1	SNE; 1; 7	SNE; 2; 4	SIL; 1; 1	**SPA**; **1**; 5	SPA; 2; 7	BRH; 1; 1	DON; 1; 3	1st	200
2018	Team Parker Racing	Bentley Continental GT3	GT3	OUL; 1; 13	OUL; 2; 10	ROC; 1; 9	SNE; 1; 10	SNE; 2; 8	SIL; 1; 6	SPA; 1; 2	BRH; 1; 24	DON; 1; 7		10th	60
2019	JRM Racing	Bentley Continental GT3	GT3	OUL; 1; 1	OUL; 2; 12	SNE; 1; 5	SNE; 2; 12	SIL; 1 DSQ	DON; 1; 7	SPA; 1; 12	BRH; 1; 9	DON; 1; 7		11th	58

=== Complete British Touring Car Championship results ===
(key) Races in bold indicate pole position (1 point awarded – 2002–2003 all races, 2004–present just in first race) Races in italics indicate fastest lap (1 point awarded all races) * signifies that driver lead race for at least one lap (1 point awarded – 2002 just in feature races, 2003–present all races)

Year	Team	Car	1	2	3	4	5	6	7	8	9	10	11	12	13	14	15	16	17	18	19	20	21	22	23	24	25	26	27	28	29	30	DC	Points
2021	Excelr8 with TradePriceCars.com	Hyundai i30 Fastback N Performance	THR; 1; 25	THR; 2 Ret	THR; 3; 16	SNE; 1; 24	SNE; 2; 27	SNE; 3; 24	BRH; 1 Ret	BRH; 2; 23	BRH; 3; 26	OUL; 1 Ret	OUL; 2; 23	OUL; 3; 19	KNO; 1; 21	KNO; 2; 27	KNO; 3; 25	THR; 1; 25	THR; 2; 20	THR; 3; 20	CRO; 1	CRO; 2	CRO; 3	SIL; 1; 23	SIL; 2; 24	SIL; 3; 22	DON; 1; 22	DON; 2; 27	DON; 3; 22	BRH; 1; 24	BRH; 2; 21	BRH; 3 Ret	27th	0
2022	UptonSteel with Euro Car Parts Racing	Infiniti Q50	DON; 1; 21	DON; 2 DNS	DON; 3; 25	BRH; 1; 28	BRH; 2; 22	BRH; 3 Ret	THR; 1; 22	THR; 2 Ret	THR; 3; 22	OUL; 1; 25	OUL; 2; 25	OUL; 3 Ret	CRO; 1	CRO; 2	CRO; 3	KNO; 1; 18	KNO; 2; 25	KNO; 3; 25	SNE; 1; 23	SNE; 2 Ret	SNE; 3 DNS	THR; 1; 27	THR; 2; 26	THR; 3; 22	SIL; 1; 21	SIL; 2; 26	SIL; 3; 22	BRH; 1 Ret	BRH; 2; 26	BRH; 3 Ret	28th	0

Sporting positions
Preceded by Jody Fannin; Warren Hughes	British GT Championship; GT4 Champion; 2013; With: Ryan Ratcliffe	Succeeded by Ross Wylie; Jake Giddings
Preceded by Jonathan Adam; Derek Johnston	British GT Championship; GT3 Champion; 2017; With: Seb Morris	Succeeded by Jonathan Adam; Flick Haigh
