= Beechdean Motorsport =

British motor racing team

(United Kingdom) Beechdean Motorsport
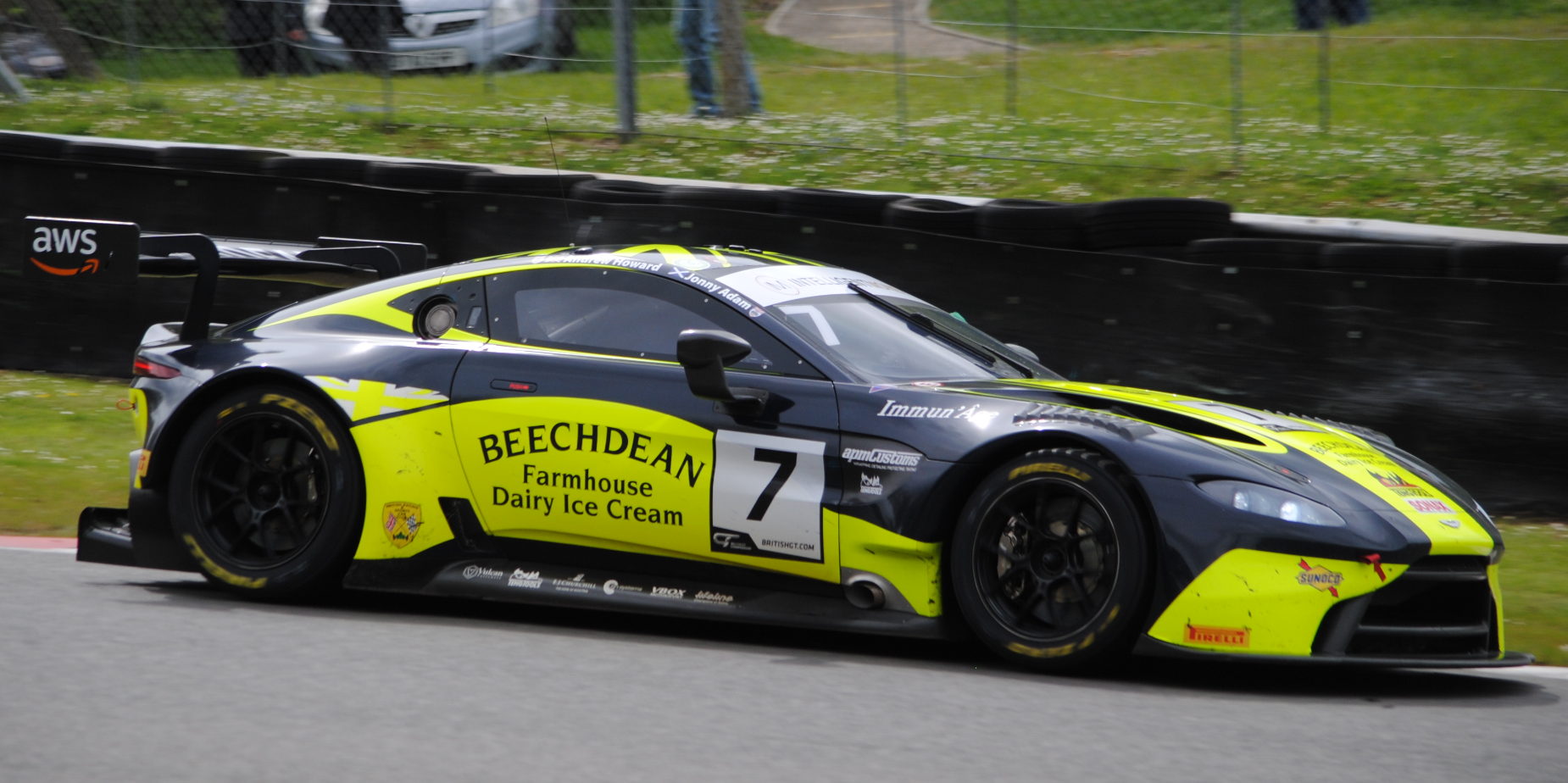
- Team principal(s): Andrew Howard
- Current series: British GT
- Former series: Le Mans Series; GT World Challenge Europe Endurance Cup; Blancpain Sprint Series
- Drivers' Championships: 1

Beechdean Motorsport (formerly Beechdean Mansell Motorsport) is a British motor racing team. The team was founded by Beechdean Farmhouse Dairy Ice Cream founder Andrew Howard, and has competed in the British GT Championship. For 2010, the team entered a partnership with Nigel Mansell that saw the team take on the name of Beechdean Mansell Motorsport. The Buckinghamshire based team ran a factory-supported Ginetta-Zytek GZ09S LMP1 in the 2010 Le Mans Series season. The drivers for the team were Nigel Mansell and his two sons Leo and Greg. The partnership ended on 18 October 2010. Howard became the 2013 British GT champion after winning the title in an Aston Martin V12 Vantage GT3. For 2014 the team expanded to include a GT4 class Aston Martin V8 Vantage GT4, driven by Ross Wylie and Jake Giddings who went on to claim the GT4 championship. In 2015 Beechdean completed the double by winning both the GT3 and GT4 classes in the same season. Jamie Chadwick and Ross Gunn took the GT4 championship while Howard went on to win the GT3 title for the second time. On this occasion he shared the honours with his co-driver Jonathan Adam, who finished 2013 6 points behind Howard after receiving a penalty.
