= James Higgins (racing driver) =

British racing driver (born 2005)

- Nationality: (United Kingdom) British
- Born: 18 October 2005 (age 21) Surrey, United Kingdom

McLaren Trophy Europe career
- Debut season: 2026
- Current team: CSA Racing
- Categorisation: FIA Silver
- Starts: 5 (5 entries)
- Wins: 0
- Podiums: 2
- Poles: 1

Previous series
- 2022–2024 2020–2021: F4 British Championship; Ginetta Junior Championship

James Higgins (born 18 October 2005) is a British racing driver who competes in McLaren Trophy Europe for CSA Racing.

== Career ==
After karting since age 8, Higgins began his career in the Ginetta Junior Championship at 14, driving for Preptech UK in his two-year stint. He made his car racing debut in three rounds of the final half of the 2020 Ginetta Junior Championship. The next year in the 2021 Ginetta Junior Championship, he contested a full-time schedule and achieved a best result yet of fourth place in the final round at Brands Hatch.

For the majority of 2022, Higgins did not race until the final two rounds of the F4 British Championship season, marking his Formula 4 debut with Fortec Motorsports.

Higgins contested the 2023 F4 British Championship full-time with Fortec. He got his first pole positions in the second round at Brands Hatch, getting his maiden podium in the first race and winning the third race. Higgins got another pair of pole positions in the fifth round at Oulton Park and converted it into his second win. He collected three more podiums in one race each of the next three rounds at Croft, Knockhill and Donington Park, respectively. He ended the championship in sixth position.

Higgins switched to Rodin Motorsport for the 2024 F4 British Championship. He got a pole position in the first race of the opening round at Donington Park which he converted to a podium. Higgins collected a pair of podiums at Snetterton and had an extremely consistent season but went without podiums for four rounds until Donington Park, where he also achieved two wins. He collected two final podiums in the penultimate round at Silverstone and ended the championship fourth in the standings.

In early 2025, Higgins tested in the GB3 Championship for Fortec Motorsports and was set for a drive in the upcoming season but the deal fell through due to a lack of budget. He spent 2025 on the sidelines, coaching Cole Hewetson in the F4 British Championship and testing GT3 cars in the summer.

In 2026, Higgins secured a seat in the 2026 McLaren Trophy Europe with CSA Racing, partnering Edgar Pierre. Pierre put their car on pole position in their debut weekend at Monza Circuit and the duo achieved their first podium in race two. In the second round at Circuit de Spa-Francorchamps, Pierre and Higgins took another podium in race one.

With CSA Racing, Higgins is set to make his GT3 debut in the fourth round of the 2026 GT World Challenge Europe Endurance Cup at the 3 Hours of Nürburgring.

== Racing record ==
=== Racing career summary ===
Season	Series	Team	Races	Wins	Poles	F/Laps	Podiums	Points	Position
2020	Ginetta Junior Championship	Preptech UK	8	0	0	0	0	45	21st
2021	Ginetta Junior Championship	Preptech UK	24	0	0	1	0	146	15th
2022	F4 British Championship	Fortec Motorsports	6	0	0	0	0	0	22nd
2023	F4 British Championship	Fortec Motorsport	30	2	4	0	6	217	6th
2024	F4 British Championship	Rodin Motorsport	30	2	1	0	7	268.5	4th
2026	McLaren Trophy Europe	CSA Racing	5	0	1	?	2	41*	5th*
2026	GT World Challenge Europe Endurance Cup	CSA Racing							

* Season still in progress.

=== Complete Ginetta Junior Championship results ===
(key) (Races in bold indicate pole position) (Races in italics indicate fastest lap)

Year	Team	1	2	3	4	5	6	7	8	9	10	11	12	13	14	15	16	17	18	19	20	21	22	23	24	25	26	DC	Points
2020	Preptech UK	DON; 1	DON; 2	DON; 3	BHGP; 1	BHGP; 2	BHGP; 3	KNO; 1	KNO; 2	KNO; 3	THR; 1	THR; 2	SIL; 1; 19	SIL; 2 Ret	SIL; 3; 12	CRO; 1	CRO; 2	SNE; 1; 12	SNE; 2; 19	SNE; 3; 14	BHI; 1; 16	BHI; 2; 10						21st	45
2021	Preptech UK	THR1; 1; 24	THR1; 2; 18	SNE; 1; 13	SNE; 2; 17	SNE; 3 Ret	BHI; 1; 16	BHI; 2; 16	BHI; 3; 14	OUL; 1; 13	OUL; 2 C	KNO; 1 Ret	KNO; 2; 17	KNO; 3; 9	KNO; 4; 10	THR2; 1; 19	THR2; 2; 23	THR2; 3 DNS	SIL; 1; 11	SIL; 2; 12	SIL; 3; 8	DON; 1; 14	DON; 2; 21	DON; 3; 18	BHGP; 1; 23	BHGP; 2; 4	BHGP; 3; 10	15th	146

=== Complete F4 British Championship results ===
(key) (Races in bold indicate pole position; races in italics indicate fastest lap)

Year	Team	1	2	3	4	5	6	7	8	9	10	11	12	13	14	15	16	17	18	19	20	21	22	23	24	25	26	27	28	29	30	31	32	DC	Points
2022	Fortec Motorsports	DON; 1	DON; 2	DON; 3	BHI; 1	BHI; 2	BHI; 3	THR1; 1	THR1; 2	THR1; 3	OUL; 1	OUL; 2	OUL; 3	CRO; 1	CRO; 2	CRO; 3	KNO; 1	KNO; 2	KNO; 3	SNE; 1	SNE; 2	SNE; 3	THR2; 1	THR2; 2	THR2; 3	SIL; 1; 14	SIL; 2; 16	SIL; 3; 13	BHGP; 1; 12	BHGP; 2; 13	BHGP; 3; 14			22nd	0
2023	Fortec Motorsport	DPN; 1; 8	DPN; 2; 6^{10}	DPN; 3; 8	**BHI**; **1**; 3	BHI; 1; 12^{5}	**BHI**; **3**; 1	SNE; 1 C	SNE; 2; 14	SNE; 3; 9	THR; 1; 10	THR; 2; 17	THR; 3 Ret	**OUL**; **1**; 15	OUL; 2; 16^{6}	**OUL**; **3**; 1	SIL; 1; 4	SIL; 2; 11^{6}	SIL; 3; 8	CRO; 1; 2	CRO; 2; 12^{6}	CRO; 3 Ret	KNO; 1 Ret	KNO; 2; 2^{1}	KNO; 3; 11	DPGP; 1; 5	DPGP; 2; 2	DPGP; 3; 11^{6}	DPGP; 4; 5	BHGP; 1; 10	BHGP; 2; 5^{2}	BHGP; 3; 13		6th	217
2024	Rodin Motorsport	**DPN**; **1**; 2	DPN; 2; 4^{7}	DPN; 3 C	BHI; 1; 5	BHI; 2; 4^{4}	BHI; 3; 4	SNE; 1; 2	SNE; 2; 15	SNE; 3; 3	THR; 1; 8	THR; 2; 6^{1}	THR; 3; 5	SILGP; 1; 4	SILGP; 2; 5^{4}	SILGP; 3 Ret	ZAN; 1; 8	ZAN; 2; 8^{5}	ZAN; 3; 10	KNO; 1; 12	KNO; 2 Ret	KNO; 3; 11	DPGP; 1; 5	DPGP; 2; 1	DPGP; 3; 1^{2}	DPGP; 4; 5	SILN; 1; 2	SILN; 2 C	SILN; 3; 2	BHGP; 1; 5	BHGP; 2; 7^{2}	BHGP; 3; 7^{2}	BHGP; 4; 5	4th	268.5
