= Joe Osborne =

British racing driver (born 1989)

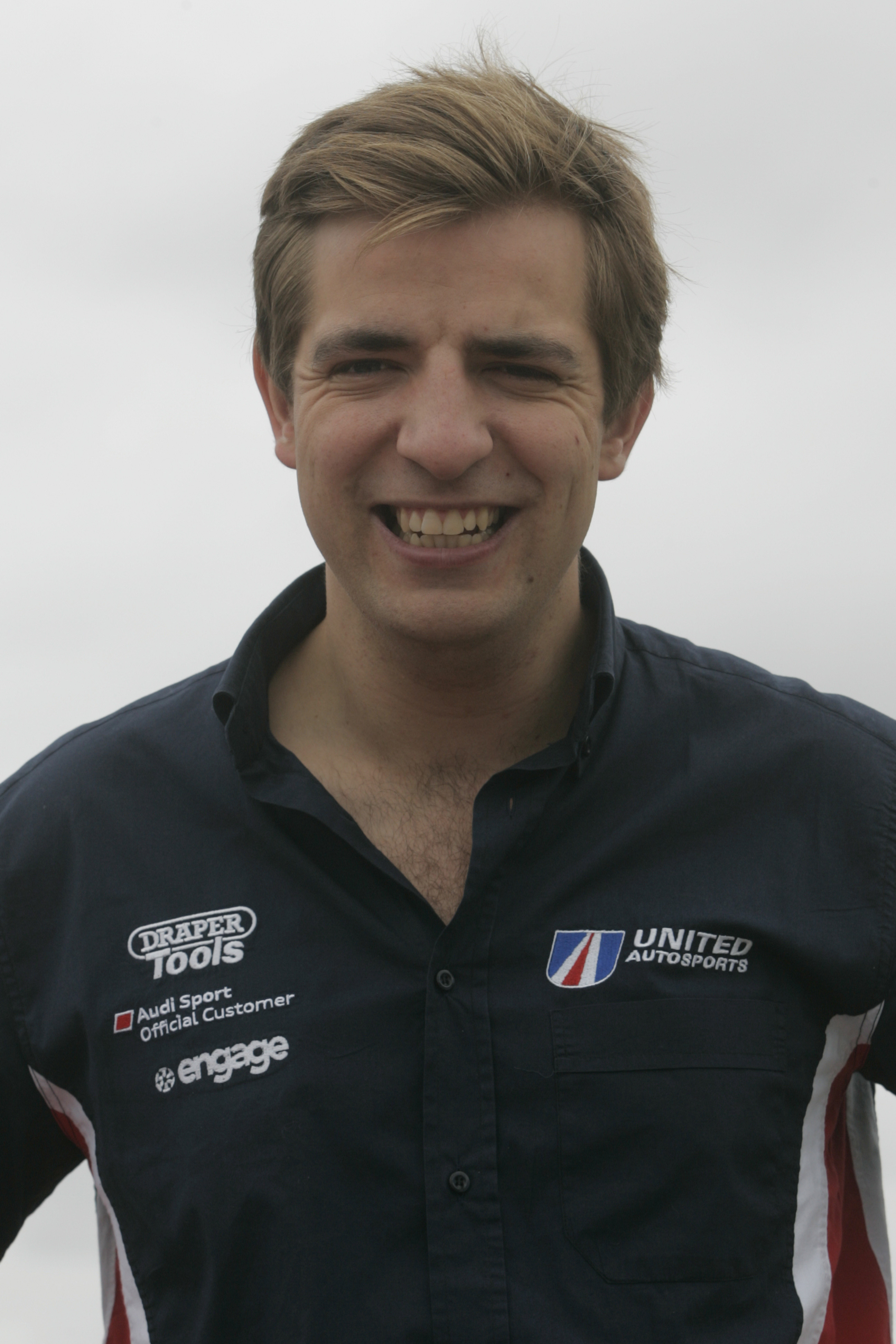
- Osborne in 2011
- Nationality: (United Kingdom) British
- Born: Joseph Michael Osborne; 7 March 1989 (age 37) Bedford, England
- Categorisation: FIA Silver (until 2016); FIA Gold (2017–)

Joseph Michael Osborne (born 7 March 1989) is a British racing driver. Born in Bedford, Bedfordshire, he is based in Olney, U.K. He won the 2009 GT4 European Cup. He was a McLaren Automotive Factory Driver from 2018 until 2022. He has since started a career in commentating, his style being described as out-spoken, direct and refreshing. He first featured on British GT in 2022, and later began working for F1TV on F1 Academy, Porsche Supercup, F3 and F2. In 2025, he replaced John Watson as expert commentator on GTWC Europe.

== Racing record ==
=== Career summary ===
Season	Series	Team	Races	Wins	Poles	F. Laps	Podiums	Points	Position
2011	FIA GT3 European Championship	United Autosports	12	0	0	0	0	2	36th
2015	24H Series - A6	Triple Eight Racing							
2016	British GT Championship - GT3	AmDTuning.com	8	0	0	1	3	96	6th
2016	24H Series - A6	Optimum Motorsport							
2016	24H Series - A6	Barwell Motorsport							
2017	Le Mans Cup - GT3	Optimum Motorsport	5	0	0	1	3	49.5	5th
2017	24H Series - A6	Optimum Motorsport							
2017	GT4 European Series Northern Cup - Pro-Am	Tolman Motorsport	2	1	0	2	2	43	13th
2017	British GT Championship - GT4	Tolman Motorsport	10	0	2	1	3	84	9th
2018	British GT Championship - GT4	Tolman Motorsport	9	1	0	0	2	82.5	6th
2019	China GT Championship	Winning Team	6	2	1	0	6	110	6th
2020	International GT Open	Optimum Motorsport	10	1	0	1	3	70	7th
2020	International GT Open - Pro-Am	Optimum Motorsport	10	4	1	1	6	54	4th
2020	GT World Challenge Europe Endurance Cup	Optimum Motorsport	3	0	0	0	0	5	24th
2020	British GT Championship - GT3	Balfe Motorsport	5	0	0	0	0	13	14th
2021	International GT Open - Pro-Am	Inception Racing	12	4	4	3	6	56	3rd
2021	24H GT Series - GT3-Am	Inception Racing with Optimum Motorsport	1	0	0	0	0	0	NC
2022	Asian Le Mans Series - GT	Inception Racing with Optimum Motorsport	4	0	0	0	0	38	6th
2022	International GT Open	Optimum Motorsport	13	3	1	2	7	125	2nd
2022	British GT Championship - GT3	Optimum Motorsport	1	0	0	0	1	0	NC†
2022	GT World Challenge Europe Endurance Cup	JP Motorsport	1	0	0	0	0	0	NC
2023	International GT Open	Optimum Motorsport	2	0	0	0	0	0	56th
2023	McLaren Trophy Europe - Artura Trophy	Optimum Motorsport							
2024	International GT Open	Greystone GT							
2026	McLaren Trophy America	Aero-B							
2026	McLaren Trophy Europe	Paddock Motorsport							
2026	International GT Open	Optimum Motorsport	2	0	0	0	0	0	NC†
