= Tom Edgar =

British Racing Driver

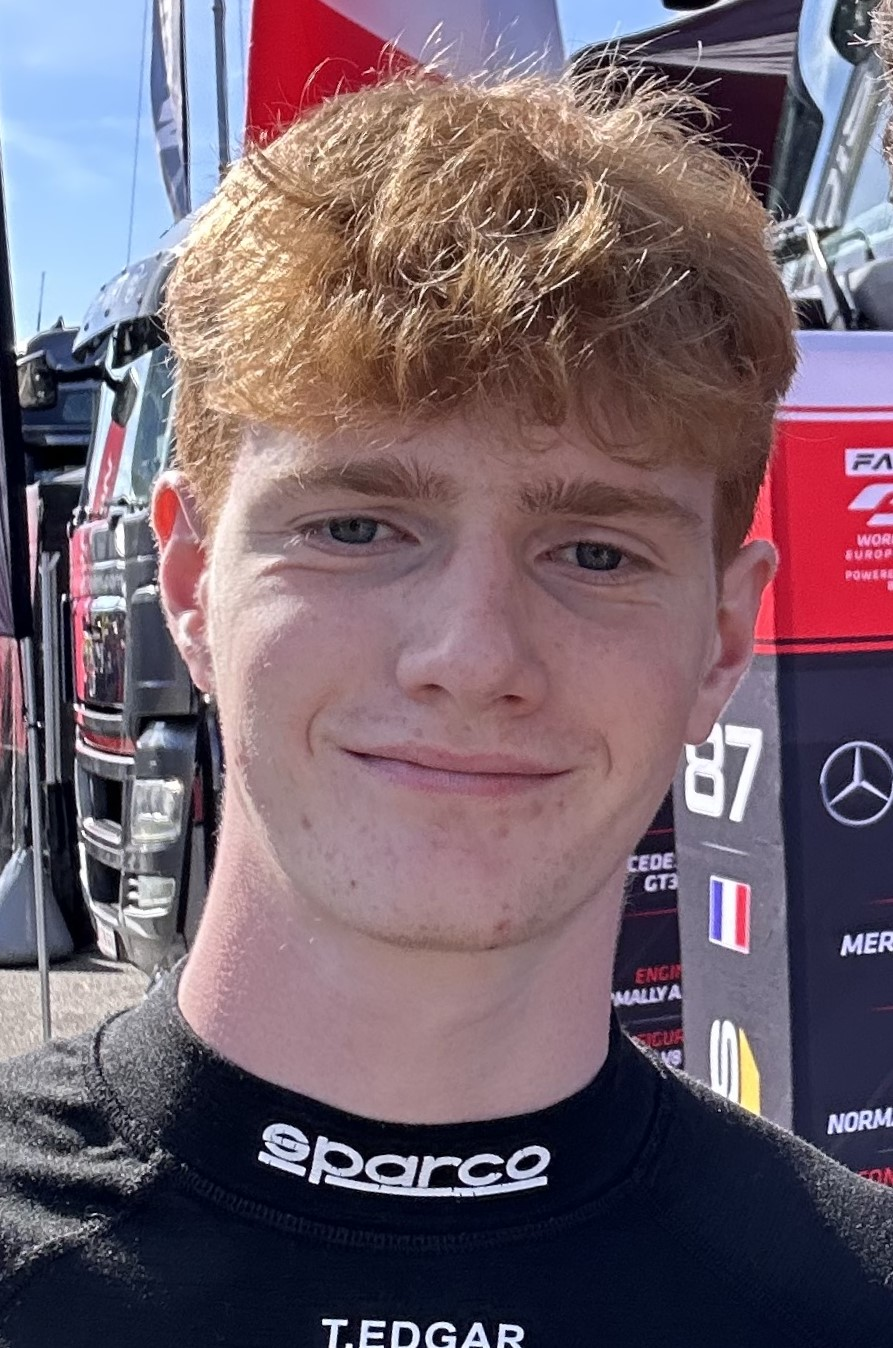
- Edgar in 2023
- Nationality: (United Kingdom) British
- Born: 29 October 2004 (age 22) Belfast, Northern Ireland, United Kingdom

ADAC GT4 Germany career
- Debut season: 2024 ADAC GT4 Germany
- Current team: FK Performance Motorsport
- Categorisation: FIA Silver
- Car number: 47
- Starts: 8 (8 entries)
- Wins: 0
- Podiums: 0
- Poles: 0
- Fastest laps: 0
- Best finish: 6th (Oschersleben Race 2, 2024) in 2024 ADAC GT4 Germany

Previous series
- 2023: GT4 European Series

Tom Edgar (born 29 October 2004) is a third generation British racing driver currently competing in the GT4 European Series with Borusan Otomotiv Motorsport.

Edgar began karting at the age of six, achieving success in various Irish and British categories before progressing into the Ginetta Juniors aged 15 in 2020 where he raced for two seasons.

In 2022, Edgar debuted in the British GT Championship for Toyota Gazoo Racing UK in the GT4 category. He finished fourth in the GT4 driver standings (third in the Silver Cup) with the team finishing fifth in the team standings. He is not related to fellow British racing drivers Jonny Edgar and Jessica Edgar.

== Career ==
=== 2022 ===
In 2022,Edgar graduated from Ginetta Juniors into GT, racing for Toyota Gazoo Racing UK. He began the season racing alongside Jack Mitchell at Oulton Park, then alongside Jordan Collard for the remainder of the season.

Round	Location	Position
1	Oulton Park	8th
2	Oulton Park	4th
3	Silverstone	13th
4	Donington Park	3rd
5	Snetterton	4th
6	Snetterton	4th
7	Spa-Francorchamps	5th
8	Brands Hatch	6th
9	Donington Park	1st*

*Denotes qualifying in pole position.

=== 2023 ===
In 2023, it was confirmed that Edgar had been selected to participate in the Motorsport UK Academy

Edgar was also selected as a BRDC Rising Star

Moving now to racing in Europe, Edgar signed with Borusan Otomitiv Motorsport to race in the GT4 European Series in a BMW M4.

Round	Location	Position
1	Monza	2nd and 3rd
2	Paul Ricard	7th and 15th
3	Spa-Francorchamps	6th and 3rd
4	Misano	4th and 1st
5	Hockenheim	15th and 8th
6	Barcelona	10th and 30th

== Racing record ==
=== Racing career summary ===
Season	Series	Team	Races	Wins	Poles	F/Laps	Podiums	Points	Position
2019	Ginetta Junior Winter Championship	Douglas Motorsport	4	0	0	0	0	0	NC
2020	Ginetta Junior Championship	Total Control Racing	21	0	0	2	2	304	6th
2021	Ginetta Junior Championship	R Racing	9	2	1	0	3	176	14th
2022	British GT Championship - GT4	Toyota Gazoo Racing UK	9	1	1	1	3	127	4th
2023	GT4 European Series - Silver	Borusan Otomotiv Motorsport	12	1	0	2	4	117	**3rd**
2024	ADAC GT4 Germany	FK Performance Motorsport	12	0	0	0	0	45	16th
2024	Nürburgring Langstrecken-Serie - VT2-FWD	Walkenhorst Motorsport							
2025	Nürburgring Langstrecken-Serie - VT2	Walkenhorst Motorsport							

* Season still in progress.

=== Complete Ginetta Junior Championship results ===
(key) (Races in bold indicate pole position) (Races in italics indicate fastest lap)

Year	Team	1	2	3	4	5	6	7	8	9	10	11	12	13	14	15	16	17	18	19	20	21	22	23	24	25	26	DC	Points
2020	Total Control Racing	DON; 1; 8	DON; 2 (13)	DON; 3; 8	BHGP; 1; 12	BHGP; 2; 11	BHGP; 3; 7	KNO; 1; 4	KNO; 2 Ret	KNO; 3; 11	THR; 1; 8	THR; 2; 4	SIL; 1; 8	SIL; 2; 5	SIL; 3; 2	CRO; 1; 3	CRO; 2; 6	SNE; 1; 7	SNE; 2; 9	SNE; 3; 7	BHI; 1; 6	BHI; 2; 7						6th	304
2021	R Racing	THR; 1; 1	THR; 2; 5	**SNE**; **1**; 4	SNE; 2; 2	SNE; 3; 1	BHI; 1; 4	BHI; 2; 8	BHI; 3; 10	OUL; 1; 17	OUL; 2 C	KNO; 1	KNO; 2	KNO; 3	KNO; 4	THR; 1	THR; 2	THR; 3	SIL; 1	SIL; 2	SIL; 3	DON; 1	DON; 2	DON; 3	BHGP; 1	BHGP; 2	BHGP; 3	14th	176

=== Complete British GT Championship results ===
(key) (Races in bold indicate pole position) (Races in italics indicate fastest lap)

Year	Team	Car	Class	1	2	3	4	5	6	7	8	9	DC	Points
2022	Toyota Gazoo Racing UK	Toyota GR Supra GT4	GT4	OUL; 1; 23	OUL; 2; 17	SIL; 1; 28	DON; 1; 20	SNE; 1; 20	SNE; 2; 19	SPA; 1; 17	BRH; 1; 16	**DON**; **1**; 13	4th	127

=== Complete GT4 European Series results ===
(key) (Races in bold indicate pole position) (Races in italics indicate fastest lap)

Year	Team	Car	Class	1	2	3	4	5	6	7	8	9	10	11	12	Pos	Points
2023	Borusan Otomotiv Motorsport	BMW M4 GT4 Gen II	Silver	MNZ; 1; 2	MNZ; 2; 3	LEC; 1; 7	LEC; 2; 15	SPA; 1; 6	SPA; 2; 3	MIS; 1; 4	MIS; 2; 1	HOC; 1; 15	HOC; 2; 8	CAT; 1; 10	CAT; 2; 30†	3rd	117

=== Complete ADAC GT4 Germany Series results ===
(key) (Races in bold indicate pole position) (Races in italics indicate fastest lap)

Year	Team	Car	Class	1	2	3	4	5	6	7	8	9	10	11	12	Pos	Points
2023	Borusan Otomotiv Motorsport	BMW M4 GT4 Gen II	Silver	OSC 1 11	OSC 2 6	LAU 1 15	LAU 2 12	NOR 1 16	NOR 2 16	NÜR 1 4	NÜR 2 1	RBR 1 15	RBR 2 8	HOC 1 10	HOC 2 30†	16th	45
