= 2026 McLaren Trophy Europe =

4th season of the McLaren Trophy Europe

The 2026 McLaren Trophy Europe was a motor racing championship for McLaren Artura Trophy cars, acting as the 4th running of the McLaren Trophy Europe. It was organised and promoted by the SRO Motorsports Group. The championship was contested over five rounds, each with two races, held at various European circuits. It began in May and finished in October.

== Entries ==
All teams competed with tyres supplied by Pirelli as SRO Motorsports Group official tyre supplier. Additionally, Am drivers featuring in either the Pro-Am or Am classes were eligible for Papaya Cup points.

Team	No.	Class	Drivers	Rounds
(United Kingdom) Greystone GT	1	P	(United Kingdom) Josh Mason	All
(United Kingdom) Greystone GT	1	P	(United Kingdom) Michael O'Brien	All
(United Kingdom) Greystone GT	2	Am	(Monaco) Philippe Prette	2
(United Kingdom) Greystone GT	33	P	(France) Hugo Bac	1–4
(United Kingdom) Greystone GT	33	P	(United Kingdom) Will Martin	1–3
(United Kingdom) Greystone GT	33	P	(United Kingdom) Josh Rattican	4
(United Kingdom) Greystone GT	44	PA	(United States) Bill Fenech PC	1
(United Kingdom) Greystone GT	44	PA	(United Kingdom) Oli Webb	1
(United Kingdom) Greystone GT	80	PA	(United Kingdom) Jon Lancaster	1–2, 4–5
(United Kingdom) Greystone GT	80	PA	(United States) Ron Trenka PC	1–2, 4–5
(Spain) SMC Motorsport	25	P	(Portugal) Luís Aguiar	5
(Spain) SMC Motorsport	25	P	(Portugal) Rafael Rajani	5
(Spain) SMC Motorsport	28	P	(Portugal) Lourenço Monteiro	All
(Spain) SMC Motorsport	28	P	(France) Lucas Valkre	All
(Spain) SMC Motorsport	68	P	(United Kingdom) Harry Burgoyne	All
(Spain) SMC Motorsport	68	P	(United Kingdom) Will Aspin	1–3, 5
(Spain) SMC Motorsport	68	P	(United Kingdom) Bradley Ellis	4
(United Kingdom) Paddock Motorsport	7	PA	(Austria) Maximilian Tarillion	1–2, 4
(United Kingdom) Paddock Motorsport	7	PA	(United Kingdom) Steven Lake PC	1
(United Kingdom) Paddock Motorsport	7	PA	(Germany) Kevin Rohrscheidt	2, 4
(United Kingdom) Paddock Motorsport	16	Am	(United States) Mark Smith	3
(United Kingdom) Paddock Motorsport	23	P	(United Kingdom) Callum Davies	All
(United Kingdom) Paddock Motorsport	23	P	(Denmark) Luca Magnussen	All
(United Kingdom) Paddock Motorsport	50	PA	(Portugal) David Coelho PC	All
(United Kingdom) Paddock Motorsport	50	PA	(United Kingdom) Matthew Higgins	All
(United Kingdom) Paddock Motorsport	52	G	(United Kingdom) Joe Osborne	5
(United Kingdom) Paddock Motorsport	52	G	(United Kingdom) Martin Plowman	5
(United Kingdom) Paddock Motorsport	69	PA	(United Kingdom) Revie Lake	4
(United Kingdom) Paddock Motorsport	69	PA	(United Kingdom) Steven Lake	4
(United Kingdom) Paddock Motorsport	87	G	(United Kingdom) Martin Plowman	4
(Italy) Target Racing	9	P	(Italy) Alessandro Fabi	All
(Italy) Target Racing	9	P	(Austria) Patrick Schober	All
(Italy) Target Racing	81	P	(Italy) Riccardo Ianniello	All
(Italy) Target Racing	81	P	(Estonia) Gregor Jeets	All
(Italy) Target Racing	96	Am	(United Kingdom) Charlie Martin	1
(Italy) Target Racing	99	P	(Denmark) Largim Ali	All
(Italy) Target Racing	99	P	(United Kingdom) Kristian Brookes	1–2, 5
(Italy) Target Racing	99	P	(Italy) Guido Luchetti	3–4
(United Kingdom) DTO Motorsport	11	P	(United Kingdom) Aston Millar	All
(United Kingdom) DTO Motorsport	11	P	(United Kingdom) Ben Mulryan	All
(Italy) Raptor Engineering	12	PA	(Greece) Dimitrios Papanastasiou	All
(Italy) Raptor Engineering	12	PA	(Italy) Ferdinando D'Auria	1–4
(Italy) Raptor Engineering	12	PA	(Italy) Flavio Olivieri	5
(Italy) Raptor Engineering	59	PA	(Italy) Jody Lambrughi	3–4
(Italy) Raptor Engineering	59	PA	(Italy) Filippo Barberi	3
(Italy) Raptor Engineering	59	PA	(Italy) Flavio Olivieri	4
(Italy) Raptor Engineering	90	P	(Italy) Flavio Olivieri	1–3
(Italy) Raptor Engineering	90	P	(Italy) Vincenzo Scarpetta	1–3
(Italy) Raptor Engineering	90	PA	(Italy) Jody Lambrughi	5
(Italy) Raptor Engineering	90	PA	(Poland) Oskar Marszałkowski	5
(United Kingdom) Race Lab	53	PA	(United Kingdom) Ross Kaiser	2
(United Kingdom) Race Lab	53	PA	(United States) Neil Langberg	2
(Switzerland) Autovitesse	63	Am	(Switzerland) Cédric Leimer PC	1, 3, 5
(Switzerland) Autovitesse	63	Am	(France) Julien Piguet	1
(Switzerland) Autovitesse	63	Am	(France) Jonathan Cochet	3
(Switzerland) Autovitesse	63	Am	(Switzerland) Laurent Jenny	5
(United Kingdom) ALFAB	88	PA	(Sweden) Erik Behrens	All
(United Kingdom) ALFAB	88	PA	(Spain) Alejandro Geppert	All
(Netherlands) Niemann Autosport	96	Am	(United Kingdom) Charlie Martin	2–5
(Netherlands) Niemann Autosport	96	Am	(United Kingdom) Emily Bishop	2–4
(Netherlands) Niemann Autosport	96	Am	(Netherlands) Albert Jochems PC	5
(France) CSA Racing	111	P	(United Kingdom) James Higgins	1–4
(France) CSA Racing	111	P	(France) Edgar Pierre	1–3
(France) CSA Racing	111	P	(Switzerland) Lucas Légeret	4–5
(France) CSA Racing	111	P	(France) Thomas Senecloze	4–5
(France) CSA Racing	111	P	(France) Hugo Bac	5
(France) CSA Racing	555	P	(Italy) Alessio Deledda	1–2
(France) CSA Racing	555	P	(France) Willyam Gosselin	1–2
(France) CSA Racing	555	P	(Switzerland) Lucas Légeret	3
(France) CSA Racing	555	P	(France) Gael Castelli	3
(France) CSA Racing	555	G	(United Kingdom) James Higgins	4

Icon	Class
P	Pro class
PA	Pro-Am class
Am	Am class
G	Guest entry
PC	Papaya Cup

- SMC Motorsport announced that David Aspin would drive the No. 5 car as a solo Am entry. Despite appearing on several entry lists, the car and driver would make no appearances over the course of the season.

== Calendar ==
Round	Circuit	Date	Supporting
1	(Italy) Monza Circuit, Monza	29–31 May	GT World Challenge Europe Endurance Cup
2	(Belgium) Circuit de Spa-Francorchamps, Stavelot	24–27 June	GT World Challenge Europe Endurance Cup; Intercontinental GT Challenge
3	(Italy) Misano World Circuit, Misano Adriatico	17–19 July	GT World Challenge Europe Sprint Cup
4	(Spain) Circuit de Barcelona-Catalunya, Montmeló	2–4 October	GT World Challenge Europe Sprint Cup
5	(Portugal) Algarve International Circuit, Portimão	16–18 October	GT World Challenge Europe Endurance Cup

=== Calendar changes ===
For 2026, the championship returned to Monza Circuit and Circuit de Spa-Francorchamps. However, in contrast to 2025, Brands Hatch, the Nürburgring and Circuit Paul Ricard did not return, with Misano World Circuit, Circuit de Barcelona-Catalunya and the Algarve International Circuit replacing them, the latter of which made its championship debut.

== Results and standings ==
=== Race results ===
Bold indicates overall winner.

Round		Circuit	Pole position	Pro Winners	Pro-Am Winners	Am Winners	Papaya Cup Winners
1	R1	(Italy) Monza Circuit	(France) No. 111 CSA Racing	**(Spain) No. 28 SMC Motorsport**	(United Kingdom) No. 88 ALFAB	(Switzerland) No. 63 Autovitesse	(United Kingdom) No. 80 Greystone GT
1	R1	(Italy) Monza Circuit	(United Kingdom) James Higgins (France) Edgar Pierre	**(Portugal) Lourenço Monteiro** **(United Kingdom) Lucas Valkre**	(Sweden) Erik Behrens (Spain) Alejandro Geppert	(France) Julien Piguet (Switzerland) Cédric Leimer	(United States) Ron Trenka
1	R2	(Italy) Monza Circuit	(Italy) No. 81 Target Racing	**(Italy) No. 81 Target Racing**	(United Kingdom) No. 80 Greystone GT	(Switzerland) No. 63 Autovitesse	(United Kingdom) No. 80 Greystone GT
1	R2	(Italy) Monza Circuit	(Italy) Riccardo Ianniello (Estonia) Gregor Jeets	**(Italy) Riccardo Ianniello** **(Estonia) Gregor Jeets**	(United Kingdom) Jon Lancaster (United States) Ron Trenka	(France) Julien Piguet (Switzerland) Cédric Leimer	(United States) Ron Trenka
2	R1	(Belgium) Circuit de Spa-Francorchamps	(Italy) No. 99 Target Racing	**(Spain) No. 68 SMC Motorsport**	(United Kingdom) No. 88 ALFAB	(United Kingdom) No. 2 Greystone GT	(United Kingdom) No. 50 Paddock Motorsport
2	R1	(Belgium) Circuit de Spa-Francorchamps	(Denmark) Largim Ali (United Kingdom) Kristian Brookes	**(United Kingdom) Will Aspin** **(United Kingdom) Harry Burgoyne**	(Sweden) Erik Behrens (Spain) Alejandro Geppert	(Monaco) Philippe Prette	(Portugal) David Coelho
2	R2	(Belgium) Circuit de Spa-Francorchamps	(United Kingdom) No. 1 Greystone GT	**(Italy) No. 99 Target Racing**	(United Kingdom) No. 88 ALFAB	(Netherlands) No. 96 Niemann Autosport	(United Kingdom) No. 80 Greystone GT
2	R2	(Belgium) Circuit de Spa-Francorchamps	(United Kingdom) Josh Mason (United Kingdom) Michael O'Brien	**(Denmark) Largim Ali** **(United Kingdom) Kristian Brookes**	(Sweden) Erik Behrens (Spain) Alejandro Geppert	(United Kingdom) Emily Bishop (United Kingdom) Charlie Martin	(United States) Ron Trenka
3	R1	(Italy) Misano World Circuit	(Spain) No. 68 SMC Motorsport	**(United Kingdom) No. 1 Greystone GT**	(Italy) No. 12 Raptor Engineering	(United Kingdom) No. 16 Paddock Motorsport	(United Kingdom) No. 50 Paddock Motorsport
3	R1	(Italy) Misano World Circuit	(United Kingdom) Will Aspin (United Kingdom) Harry Burgoyne	**(United Kingdom) Josh Mason** **(United Kingdom) Michael O'Brien**	(Italy) Ferdinando D'Auria (Greece) Dimitrios Papanastasiou	(United States) Mark Smith	(Portugal) David Coelho
3	R2	(Italy) Misano World Circuit	(United Kingdom) No. 88 ALFAB	**(Italy) No. 99 Target Racing**	(Italy) No. 12 Raptor Engineering	(Switzerland) No. 63 Autovitesse	(United Kingdom) No. 50 Paddock Motorsport
3	R2	(Italy) Misano World Circuit	(Sweden) Erik Behrens (Spain) Alejandro Geppert	**(Denmark) Largim Ali** **(Italy) Guido Luchetti**	(Italy) Ferdinando D'Auria (Greece) Dimitrios Papanastasiou	(France) Jonathan Cochet (Switzerland) Cédric Leimer	(Portugal) David Coelho
4	R1	(Spain) Circuit de Barcelona-Catalunya	(France) No. 111 CSA Racing	**(Spain) No. 68 SMC Motorsport**	(Italy) No. 90 Raptor Engineering	No entries	(United Kingdom) No. 50 Paddock Motorsport
4	R1	(Spain) Circuit de Barcelona-Catalunya	(Switzerland) Lucas Légeret (France) Thomas Senecloze	**(United Kingdom) Harry Burgoyne** **(United Kingdom) Bradley Ellis**	(Italy) Jody Lambrughi (Italy) Flavio Olivieri	No entries	(Portugal) David Coelho
4	R2	(Spain) Circuit de Barcelona-Catalunya	Cancelled	**(Italy) No. 99 Target Racing**	(Italy) No. 90 Raptor Engineering	No entries	(United Kingdom) No. 50 Paddock Motorsport
4	R2	(Spain) Circuit de Barcelona-Catalunya	Cancelled	**(Denmark) Largim Ali** **(United Kingdom) Kristian Brookes**	(Italy) Jody Lambrughi (Italy) Flavio Olivieri	No entries	(Portugal) David Coelho
5	R1	(Portugal) Algarve International Circuit	(United Kingdom) No. 1 Greystone GT	**(Spain) No. 68 SMC Motorsport**	(United Kingdom) No. 88 ALFAB	(Switzerland) No. 63 Autovitesse	(United Kingdom) No. 50 Paddock Motorsport
5	R1	(Portugal) Algarve International Circuit	(United Kingdom) Josh Mason (United Kingdom) Michael O'Brien	**(United Kingdom) Harry Burgoyne** **(United Kingdom) Bradley Ellis**	(Sweden) Erik Behrens (Spain) Alejandro Geppert	(Switzerland) Laurent Jenny (Switzerland) Cédric Leimer	(Portugal) David Coelho
5	R2	(Portugal) Algarve International Circuit	(United Kingdom) No. 88 ALFAB	**(Italy) No. 81 Target Racing**	(Italy) No. 90 Raptor Engineering	(Switzerland) No. 63 Autovitesse	(United Kingdom) No. 50 Paddock Motorsport
5	R2	(Portugal) Algarve International Circuit	(Sweden) Erik Behrens (Spain) Alejandro Geppert	**(Italy) Riccardo Ianniello** **(Estonia) Gregor Jeets**	(Italy) Jody Lambrughi (Poland) Oskar Marszałkowski	(Switzerland) Laurent Jenny (Switzerland) Cédric Leimer	(Portugal) David Coelho

=== Scoring system ===
Drivers' points

Championship points are awarded for the first eight positions in each race.

Position	**1st**	**2nd**	**3rd**	**4th**	**5th**	**6th**	**7th**	**8th**
Points	12	9	7	5	4	3	2	1

=== Drivers' Championship standings ===
==== Pro ====
Pos.	Driver	Team	MON (Italy)		SPA (Belgium)		MIS (Italy)		BAR (Spain)		POR (Portugal)		Points
1	(United Kingdom) Callum Davies (Denmark) Luca Magnussen	(United Kingdom) Paddock Motorsport	2	9	3	3	2	6	2	5	8	6	54
2	(United Kingdom) Josh Mason (United Kingdom) Michael O'Brien	(United Kingdom) Greystone GT	Ret	4	Ret	2	1	5	3	2	Ret	2	53.5
3	(Denmark) Largim Ali	(Italy) Target Racing	4	7	6	1	Ret	1	8	1	3	Ret	53
4	(Italy) Riccardo Ianniello (Estonia) Gregor Jeets	(Italy) Target Racing	3	1	4	10	4	2	6	6	DSQ	1	50
5	(United Kingdom) Harry Burgoyne	(Spain) SMC Motorsport	5	3	1	Ret	Ret	Ret	1	Ret	1	4	48.5
6	(United Kingdom) Kristian Brookes	(Italy) Target Racing	4	7	6	1			8	1	3	Ret	41
7	(Portugal) Lourenço Monteiro (United Kingdom) Lucas Valkre	(Spain) SMC Motorsport	1	6	7	6	3	9	4	7	5	7	38.5
8	(United Kingdom) Aston Millar (United Kingdom) Ben Mulryan	(United Kingdom) DTO Motorsport	8	8	5	4	Ret	3	Ret	4	2	5	35.5
9	(United Kingdom) James Higgins (France) Edgar Pierre	(France) CSA Racing	9	2	2	5	6	7					23.5
10	(United Kingdom) Will Aspin	(Spain) SMC Motorsport	5	3	1	Ret	Ret	Ret					19.5
11	(Italy) Alessandro Fabi (Austria) Patrick Shober	(Italy) Target Racing	10	5	Ret	9	7	Ret	5	Ret	6	3	18
12	(France) Hugo Bac	(United Kingdom) Greystone GT	Ret	Ret	8	7	5	4	7	DSQ			15
12	(France) Hugo Bac	(France) CSA Racing									4	9	15
13	(Italy) Guido Luchetti	(Italy) Target Racing					Ret	1					12
14	(United Kingdom) Will Martin	(United Kingdom) Greystone GT	Ret	Ret	8	7	5	4					9
15	(Italy) Flavio Olivieri (Italy) Vincenzo Scarpetta	(Italy) Raptor Engineering	7	Ret	Ret	8	8	8					5
16	(Italy) Alessio Deledda (France) Willyam Gosselin	(France) CSA Racing	6	10	Ret	Ret							6
Drivers ineligible to score points
–	(United Kingdom) Bradley Ellis	(Spain) SMC Motorsport							1	Ret	1	4	0
–	(Switzerland) Lucas Légeret	(France) CSA Racing					Ret	Ret	Ret	3			0
–	(France) Thomas Senecloze	(France) CSA Racing							Ret	3	4	9	0
–	(United Kingdom) Josh Rattican	(United Kingdom) Greystone GT							7	DSQ			0
–	(France) Gael Castelli	(France) CSA Racing					Ret	Ret					0
–	(Portugal) Luís Aguiar (Portugal) Rafael Rajani	(Spain) SMC Motorsport									7	8	0
Pos.	Driver	Team	MON (Italy)		SPA (Belgium)		MIS (Italy)		BAR (Spain)		POR (Portugal)		Points

Key
Colour	Result
Gold	Race winner
Silver	2nd place
Bronze	3rd place
Green	Points finish
Blue	Non-points finish
Blue	Non-classified finish (NC)
Purple	Did not finish (Ret)
Black	Disqualified (DSQ)
Black	Excluded (EX)
White	Did not start (DNS)
White	Race cancelled (C)
White	Withdrew (WD)
Blank	Did not participate

==== Pro-Am ====
Pos.	Driver	Team	MON (Italy)		SPA (Belgium)		MIS (Italy)		BAR (Spain)		POR (Portugal)		Points
1	(Sweden) Erik Behrens (Spain) Alejandro Geppert	(United Kingdom) ALFAB	1	2	1	1	2	2	2	Ret	1	2	88.5
2	(Portugal) David Coelho (United Kingdom) Matthew Higgins	(United Kingdom) Paddock Motorsport	6	6	2	4	3	3	4	4	2	4	55
3	(Greece) Dimitrios Papanastasiou	(Italy) Raptor Engineering	2	5	4	Ret	1	1	6	3	DSQ	3	54
=	(Italy) Ferdinando D'Auria	(Italy) Raptor Engineering	2	5	4	Ret	1	1	6	3			54
4	(United Kingdom) Jon Lancaster (United States) Ron Trenka	(United Kingdom) Greystone GT	3	1	5	3			5	5	3	5	43
5	(Italy) Jody Lambrughi	(Italy) Raptor Engineering					4	Ret	1	1	DSQ	1	41
6	(Austria) Maximilian Tarillion	(United Kingdom) Paddock Motorsport	4	3	3	2			3	2			40.5
7	(Italy) Flavio Olivieri	(Italy) Raptor Engineering							1	1	DSQ	3	36
8	(Germany) Kevin Rohrscheidt	(United Kingdom) Paddock Motorsport			3	2			3	2			32
9	(United Kingdom) Steven Lake	(United Kingdom) Paddock Motorsport	4	3									8.5
10	(United States) Bill Fenech (United Kingdom) Oli Webb	(United Kingdom) Greystone GT	5	4									6.5
11	(Italy) Filippo Barberi	(Italy) Raptor Engineering					4	Ret					5
Drivers ineligible to score points
–	(Poland) Oskar Marszałkowski	(Italy) Raptor Engineering									DSQ	1	0
–	(United Kingdom) Ross Kaiser (United States) Neil Langberg	(United Kingdom) Race Lab			6	5							0
Pos.	Driver	Team	MON (Italy)		SPA (Belgium)		MIS (Italy)		BAR (Spain)		POR (Portugal)		Points

==== Am ====
Pos.	Driver	Team	MON (Italy)		SPA (Belgium)		MIS (Italy)		BAR (Spain)		POR (Portugal)		Points
1	(United Kingdom) Charlie Martin	(Italy) Target Racing	2	2									50.5
1	(United Kingdom) Charlie Martin	(Netherlands) Niemann Autosport			Ret	1	2	3	WD	WD	2	2	50.5
2	(Switzerland) Cédric Leimer	(Switzerland) Autovitesse	1	1			Ret	1			1	1	42
3	(United Kingdom) Emily Bishop	(Netherlands) Niemann Autosport			Ret	1	2	3	WD	WD			28
4	(United States) Mark Smith	(United Kingdom) Paddock Motorsport					1	2					21
5	(France) Julien Piguet	(Switzerland) Autovitesse	1	1									18
6	(France) Jonathan Cochet	(Switzerland) Autovitesse					Ret	1					12
=	(Monaco) Philippe Prette	(United Kingdom) Greystone GT			1	Ret							12
Drivers ineligible to score points
–	(Switzerland) Laurent Jenny	(Switzerland) Autovitesse									1	1	0
–	(Netherlands) Albert Jochems	(Netherlands) Niemann Autosport									2	2	0
Pos.	Driver	Team	MON (Italy)		SPA (Belgium)		MIS (Italy)		BAR (Spain)		POR (Portugal)		Points

==== Papaya Cup ====
Pos.	Driver	Team	MON (Italy)		SPA (Belgium)		MIS (Italy)		BAR (Spain)		POR (Portugal)		Points
1	(Portugal) David Coelho	(United Kingdom) Paddock Motorsport	4	Ret	1	2	1	1	1	1	1	1	98
2	(United States) Ron Trenka	(United Kingdom) Greystone GT	1	1	2	1			2	2	2	2	75
4	(United Kingdom) Steven Lake	(United Kingdom) Paddock Motorsport	2	2									13.5
5	(United States) Bill Fenech	(United Kingdom) Greystone GT	3	3									10.5
Pos.	Driver	Team	MON (Italy)		SPA (Belgium)		MIS (Italy)		BAR (Spain)		POR (Portugal)		Points

=== Teams' Championship standings ===
Pos.	Team	Points
1	(Spain) SMC Motorsport	98.5
2	(United Kingdom) Paddock Motorsport	83
3	(United Kingdom) Greystone GT	81.5
4	(Italy) Target Racing	81
5	(Italy) Raptor Engineering	64.5
6	(France) CSA Racing	55
7	(United Kingdom) ALFAB	51
8	(United Kingdom) DTO Motorsport	47.5
9	(Netherlands) Niemann Autosport	10
–	(Switzerland) Autovitesse	0
–	(United Kingdom) Race Lab	0
Pos.	Team	Points

== See also ==
- 2026 McLaren Trophy America
