= Callum Voisin =

British-Swiss racing driver (born 2006)

- Voisin driving a Porsche Carrera at Silverstone Circuit in 2026
- Nationality: (United Kingdom) British (Switzerland) Swiss via dual nationality
- Born: 6 March 2006 (age 20) Geneva, Switzerland
- Relatives: Bailey Voisin (brother)

Porsche Carrera Cup Great Britain career
- Debut season: 2026
- Current team: Century Motorsport
- Categorisation: FIA Silver
- Car number: 35
- Starts: 1
- Wins: 1
- Podiums: 1
- Poles: 0
- Fastest laps: 0
- Best finish: 1 in 2026

Previous series
- 2024–2025 2022–2024 2021: FIA Formula 3 Championship; GB3 Championship; Ginetta Junior Championship

Championship titles
- 2023 2026: GB3 Championship; Porsche Carrera Cup Great Britain - Pro

Callum Voisin (/ˈvɔɪzən/ VOY-zən; born 6 March 2006) is a British-Swiss racing driver who currently competes in the Porsche Carrera Cup GB for Century Motorsport and the Porsche Carrera Cup Italia for Ombra Racing.

Voisin most notably competed in FIA Formula 3 for Rodin Motorsport in 2024 and 2025, and was the 2023 GB3 champion.

== Junior racing career ==
=== Ginetta Junior Championship ===
Voisin began his car racing career at the age of 15 in the Ginetta Junior Championship at R Racing.

=== GB3 Championship ===
==== 2022 ====
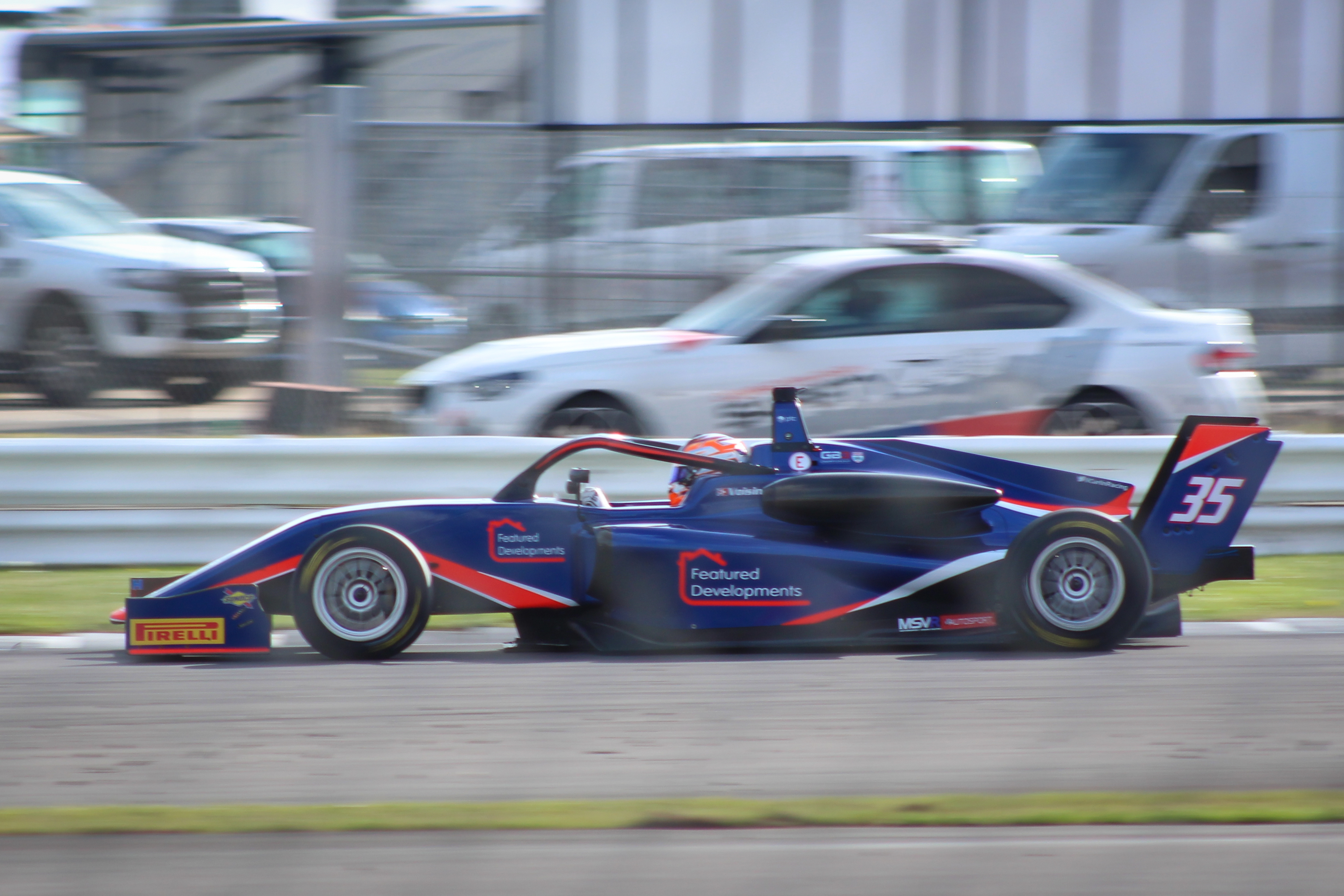
Voisin driving in the 2022 GB3 Championship.

In 2022, Voisin progressed to the GB3 Championship with Carlin, partnering Javier Sagrera and Roberto Faria. Having started out with an unremarkable round at Oulton Park, Voisin would score his first top five finish at the next event in Silverstone, before tasting victory for the first time in single-seaters, winning Race 1 at Donington. He continued impressing at the following round, held at Snetterton Circuit, where he scored another victory after taking his first pole position in the series. Another podium came in Race 3 at Spa-Francorchamps, where, having originally been declared the winner, a red flag regulation denied Voisin first place, with victory being instead awarded to Tommy Smith. The following week, Voisin scored a pair of pole positions, which, despite him failing to convert them into wins, yielded two second places. Voisin ended his season by taking another victory at Donington Park, which left him fourth in the overall standings, ahead of his two teammates. In addition, Voisin won the Jack Cavill Pole Position Cup for amassing the highest number of pole positions throughout the campaign.

In late 2022, Voisin was among the final ten candidates for the Aston Martin Autosport BRDC Award.

==== 2023 ====
Voisin remained with the renamed Rodin Carlin for the 2023 GB3 Championship, partnering John Bennett and Costa Toparis. While JHR's Joseph Loake and later Hitech's Alex Dunne took early leads in the championship, Voisin stayed in the fight with regular main race podiums—including two each at Oulton Park and Spa. He reached the top of the standings by Round 5, and scored his first win of the season and another double podium the next weekend at Brands Hatch. With double pole, victory and second place at the Donington decider, Voisin clinched the GB3 title by 18 points from Dunne.

In late 2023, Voisin was a finalist in the Aston Martin Autosport BRDC Award, along with F3 rookie Taylor Barnard, GB3 title rival Loake, and F4 driver Arvid Lindblad. Loake won the shootout.

==== 2024 ====
Voisin returned to the 2024 GB3 Championship for a one-off round at the season finale in Brands Hatch with Rodin Motorsport.

=== USF Pro Championship ===
At the end of October 2022, Voisin took part in a USF Pro 2000 Championship test at the Indianapolis Motor Speedway with Jay Howard Driver Development.

=== FIA Formula 3 Championship ===
==== 2024 ====
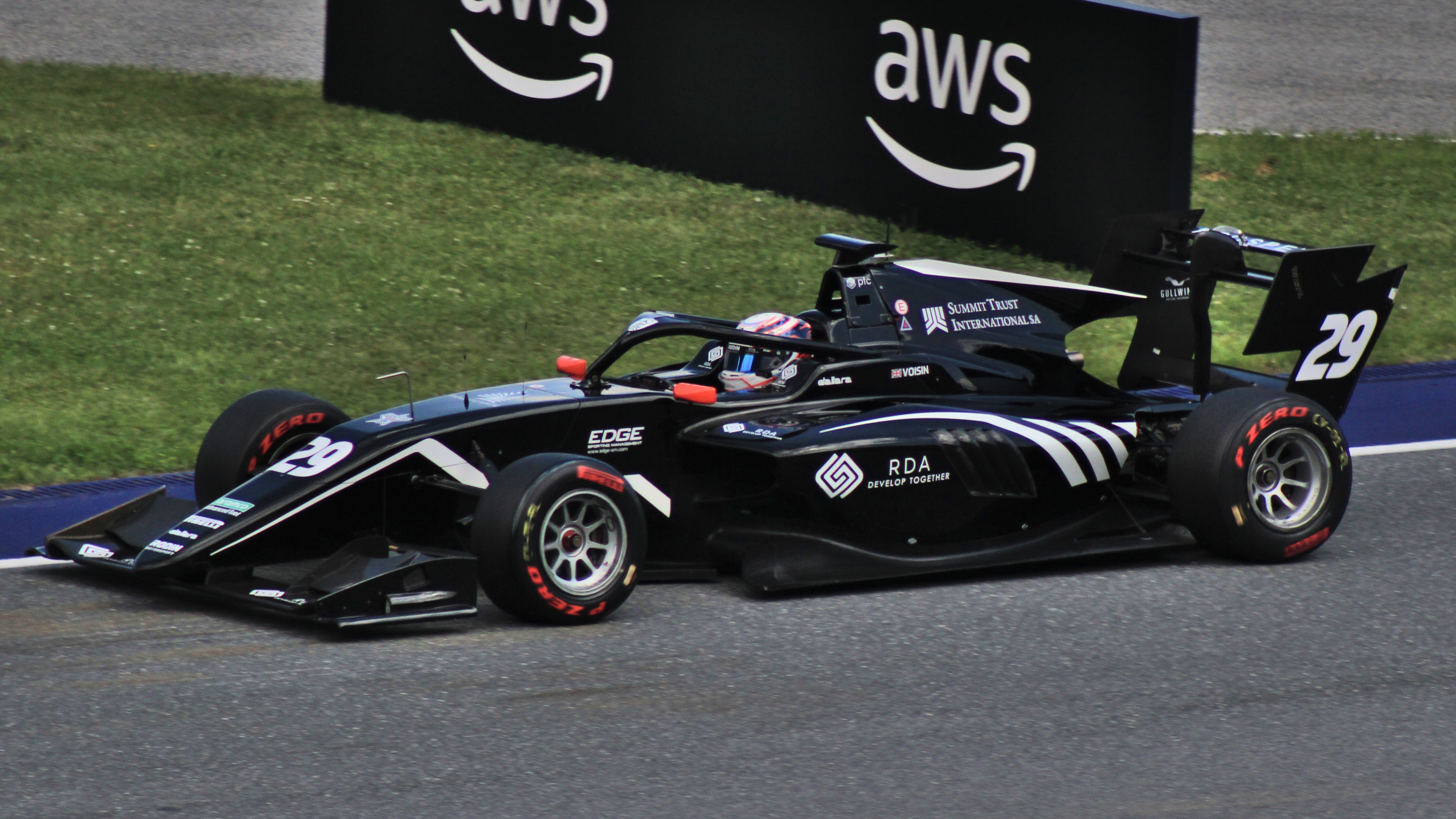
Voisin driving the Dallara F3 2019 during the 2024 Spielberg Formula 3 round

After winning the GB3 championship, Voisin was promoted to FIA Formula 3 for 2024, remaining with Rodin Carlin, now renamed Rodin Motorsport. Voisin secured his first podium in the series at the Silverstone Formula 3 feature race. He was originally set to win the race, but a ten-second time penalty demoted him to third, with Arvid Lindblad inheriting the victory. During the Spa-Francorchamps feature race, Voisin achieved a grand slam; he was able secure his maiden win, pole position, and fastest lap in the series. Additionally, he maintained the lead at the start of every lap during the race. It was also Rodin's first win in the championship. He finished the season in 12th position overall with 67 points.

==== 2025 ====
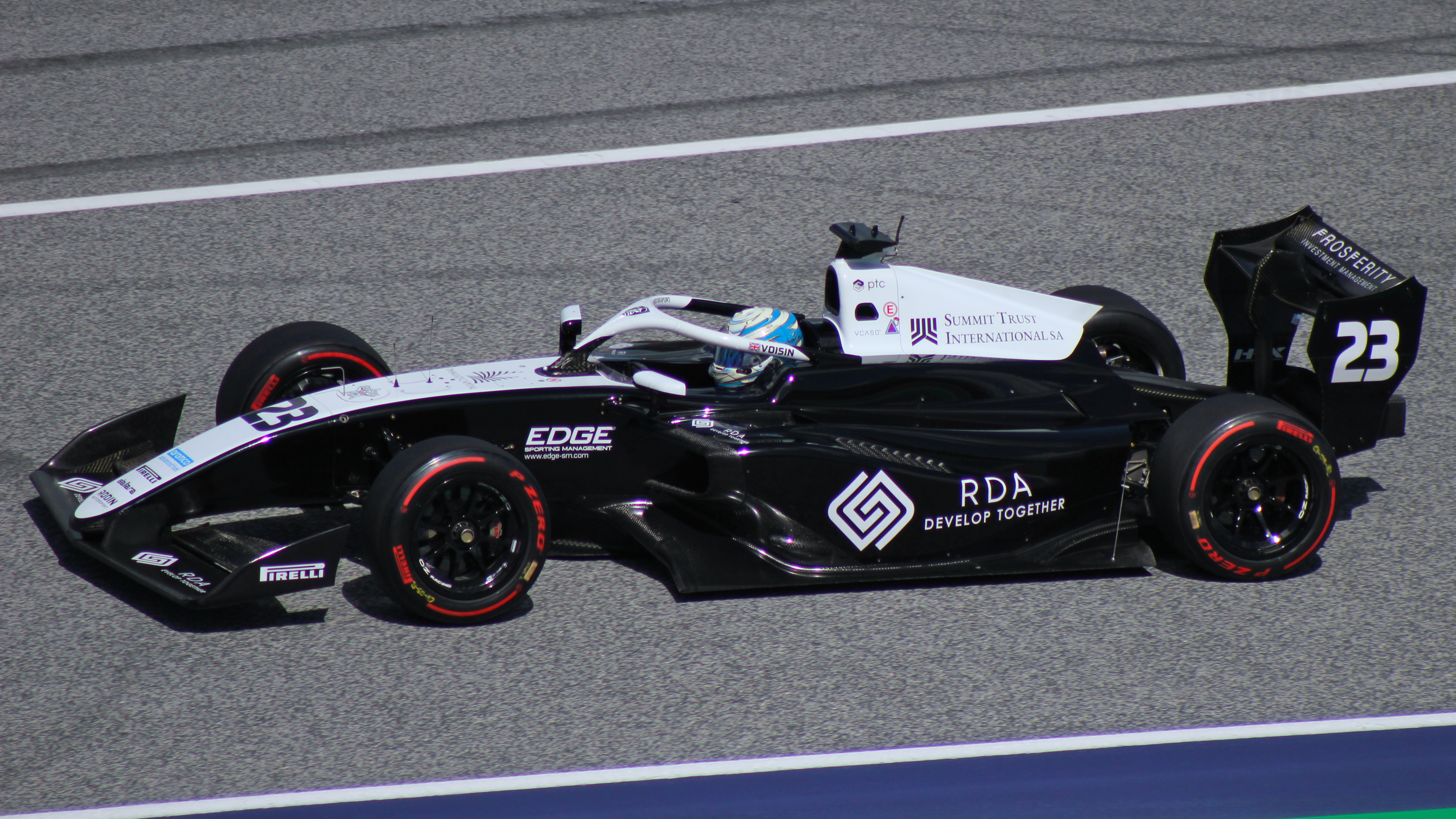
Voisin driving the Dallara F3 2025 during the 2025 Spielberg Formula 3 round.

Voisin continued with Rodin Motorsport for the 2025 FIA Formula 3 Championship alongside fellow Roman Biliński and fellow GB3 champion Louis Sharp. The opening weekend in Melbourne was difficult, with Voisin taking ninth place in the sprint but retiring from the feature race after an incident with Nikola Tsolov. He then took his first podium of the season in Bahrain, finishing second in the feature race, which put him third in the overall standings. The following triple header had highs and lows: he failed to score in either race at Imola, then bounced back with a fourth place in the Monaco feature race, followed by another tough weekend in Barcelona where he scored just one point.

=== Formula E ===
In July 2025, Voisin tested a Formula E car for the first time at the Tempelhof Airport Street Circuit, driving for Cupra Kiro during the Formula E Berlin rookie test alongside Bianca Bustamante, placing fourth in the afternoon session. The following year in March, he drove for Andretti during the Madrid ePrix rookie test.

For the 2026–27 season, Voisin was announced to be the development driver for Andretti.

== Sportscar career ==
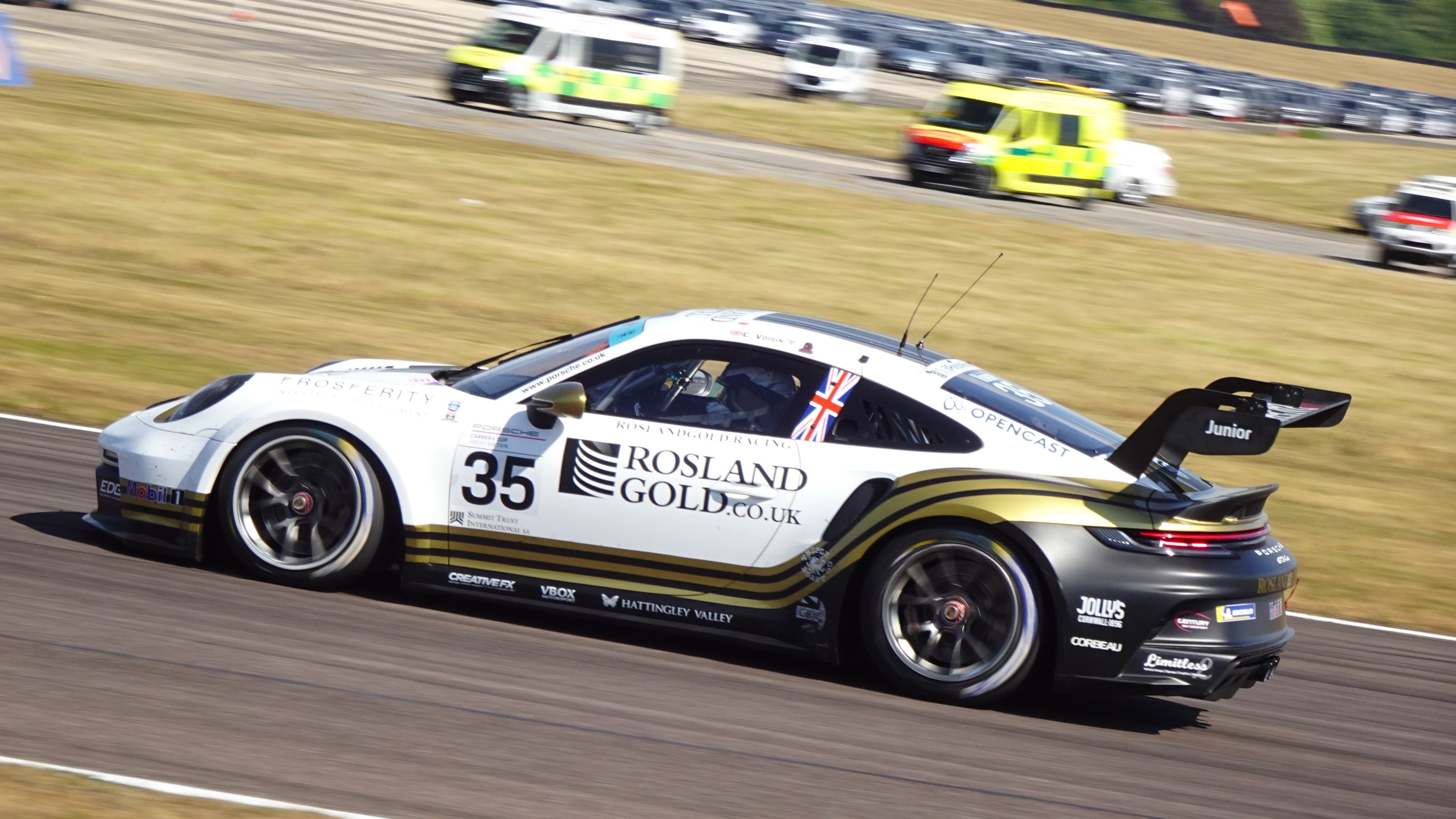
Voison racing at the Thruxton Circuit in 2026

In October 2025, Voisin was selected as one of the finalists to be the next Porsche Carrera Cup Great Britain junior.

=== 2026 ===
Voisin was picked as the Porsche Carrera Cup Great Britain junior for the 2026 season.

== Karting record ==
=== Karting career summary ===
Season	Series	Team	Position
2019	Kartmasters British Grand Prix — X30 Mini	Coles Racing	8th
2019	British Kart Championship — Rotax Mini Max	Coles Racing	4th
2019	BNL Karting Series — Junior Max	Coles Racing	16th
2019	Rotax Max Challenge International Trophy — Junior Max	Coles Racing	34th
2019	Rotax Max Challenge Grand Finals — Mini Max	Coles Racing	27th
2020	Rotax Max Euro Winter Cup — Junior	Coles Racing	5th
2020	Kartmasters British Grand Prix — Rotax Junior	Coles Racing	18th
2020	British Kart Championship — Rotax Junior	Coles Racing	3rd

== Racing record ==
=== Racing career summary ===
Season	Series	Team	Races	Wins	Poles	F/Laps	Podiums	Points	Position
2021	Ginetta Junior Championship	R Racing	25	7	3	6	11	415	6th
2022	GB3 Championship	Carlin	24	3	5	4	6	359	4th
2023	GB3 Championship	Rodin Carlin	23	2	6	1	11	484	**1st**
2024	FIA Formula 3 Championship	Rodin Motorsport	20	1	1	1	2	67	12th
2024	GB3 Championship	Rodin Motorsport	3	0	0	1	1	40	24th
2025	FIA Formula 3 Championship	Rodin Motorsport	19	0	0	0	1	52	14th
2025–26	Asian Le Mans Series - LMP3	High Class Racing	6	0	1	0	1	54	8th
2026	Porsche Carrera Cup Great Britain - Pro	Century Motorsport	6	4	1	1	6	63	1st*
2026	Porsche Carrera Cup Italy	Ombra Racing	10	0	0	0	2	85	9th
2026	Le Mans Cup - LMP3	Inter Europol Competition	1	0	0	0	0	6	21st
2026–27	Formula E	Andretti Formula E	Development driver						

* Season still in progress.

=== Complete Ginetta Junior Championship results ===
(key) (Races in bold indicate pole position) (Races in italics indicate fastest lap)

Year	Team	1	2	3	4	5	6	7	8	9	10	11	12	13	14	15	16	17	18	19	20	21	22	23	24	25	26	DC	Points	Ref
2021	R Racing	THR; 1; 5	THR; 2; 1	SNE; 1; 1	SNE; 2 DSQ	SNE; 3; 10	**BHI**; **1**; 1	**BHI**; **2**; 1	BHI; 3; 1	OUL; 1; 9	OUL; 2 C	KNO; 1; 9	KNO; 2; 1	KNO; 3; 3	KNO; 4; 5	**THR**; **1**; 22	THR; 2; 1	**THR**; **3**; 2	SIL; 1; 22	SIL; 2; 15	SIL; 3; 6	DON; 1; 13	DON; 2; 7	DON; 3; 3	BHGP; 1; 3	BHGP; 2; 21	BHGP; 3; 13	6th	415	

=== Complete GB3 Championship results ===
(key) (Races in bold indicate pole position) (Races in italics indicate fastest lap)

Year	Team	1	2	3	4	5	6	7	8	9	10	11	12	13	14	15	16	17	18	19	20	21	22	23	24	DC	Points	Ref
2022	Carlin	OUL; 1; 20	OUL; 2; 9	OUL; 3; 13^{2}	SIL1; 1; 10	SIL1; 2; 5	SIL1; 3; 8^{3}	DON1; 1; 1	DON1; 2; 7	DON1; 3; 6^{13}	**SNE**; **1**; 1	SNE; 2 Ret	SNE; 3; 17^{5}	SPA; 1; 8	SPA; 2; 10	SPA; 3; 2^{3}	**SIL2**; **1**; 2	**SIL2**; **2**; 2	SIL2; 3; 4^{15}	BRH; 1; 9	BRH; 2; 13	BRH; 3 Ret	**DON2**; **1**; 1	**DON2**; **2**; 9	DON2; 3 Ret	4th	359	
2023	Rodin Carlin	OUL; 1; 3	OUL; 2; 2	OUL; 3 Ret	SIL1; 1; 6	SIL1; 2; 3	SIL1; 3; 4⁸	**SPA**; **1**; 2	**SPA**; **2**; 2	SPA; 3; 10¹⁵	SNE; 1; 3	**SNE**; **2** Ret	SNE; 3; 11¹²	SIL2; 1; 3	SIL2; 2; 5	SIL2; 3 C	BRH; 1; 2	**BRH**; **2**; 1	BRH; 3; 14^{9}	ZAN; 1; 7	ZAN; 2; 6	ZAN; 3; 5^{10}	**DON**; **1**; 1	**DON**; **2**; 2	DON; 3; 12^{10}	1st	484	
2024	Rodin Motorsport	OUL; 1	OUL; 2	OUL; 3	SIL1; 1	SIL1; 2	SIL1; 3	SPA; 1	SPA; 2	SPA; 3	HUN; 1	HUN; 2	HUN; 3	ZAN; 1	ZAN; 2	ZAN; 3	SIL2; 1	SIL2; 2	SIL2; 3	DON; 1	DON; 2	DON; 3	BRH; 1; 9	BRH; 2; 10	BRH; 3; 2	24th	40	

=== Complete FIA Formula 3 Championship results ===
(key) (Races in bold indicate pole position) (Races in italics indicate fastest lap)

Year	Entrant	1	2	3	4	5	6	7	8	9	10	11	12	13	14	15	16	17	18	19	20	DC	Points	Ref
2024	Rodin Motorsport	BHR; SPR; 17	BHR; FEA; 21	MEL; SPR; 18	MEL; FEA; 21	IMO; SPR; Ret	IMO; FEA; 29	MON; SPR; 12	MON; FEA; 13	CAT; SPR; Ret	CAT; FEA; 16	RBR; SPR; 14	RBR; FEA; 25	SIL; SPR; 4	SIL; FEA; 3	HUN; SPR; 6	HUN; FEA; 6	SPA; SPR; 7	**SPA**; **FEA**; 1	MNZ; SPR; 25	MNZ; FEA; 22†	12th	67	
2025	Rodin Motorsport	MEL; SPR; 9	MEL; FEA; Ret	BHR; SPR; 4	BHR; FEA; 2	IMO; SPR; 26	IMO; FEA; 18	MON; SPR; 10	MON; FEA; 4	CAT; SPR; 16	CAT; FEA; 10	RBR; SPR; 8	RBR; FEA; 8	SIL; SPR; 22	SIL; FEA; 19	SPA; SPR; 17	SPA; FEA; C	HUN; SPR; 18	HUN; FEA; 15	MNZ; SPR; 7	MNZ; FEA; 12	14th	52	

Sporting positions
Preceded by Luke Browning	GB3 Championship; Champion; 2023	Succeeded by Louis Sharp
