= 2021 Ginetta Junior Championship =

The 2021 Michelin Ginetta Junior Championship was a multi-event, one make motor racing championship held across England and Scotland. The championship featured a mix of professional teams and privately funded drivers, aged between 14 and 17, competing in Ginetta G40s that conformed to the technical regulations for the championship. It formed part of the extensive program of support categories built up around the British Touring Car Championship centrepiece. It was the fifteenth Ginetta Junior Championship, commencing on 8 May 2021 at Thruxton and concluding on 24 October 2021 at Brands Hatch, utilising the Grand Prix circuit, after ten meetings, all in support of the 2021 British Touring Car Championship. After a one year absence, Ginetta confirmed the Winter Series will return at the end of the year. A scholarship allowed a driver who had raced in go karts to start racing cars. The first round of the championship saw the record broken for most entries in a Ginetta Junior event. R Racing and Elite Motorsport are the most competitive teams, with Fox Motorsport also winning at Snetterton.

== Teams and drivers ==
Team	No.	Driver	Rounds
Elite Motorsport	10	(United Kingdom) Josh Rowledge	All
Elite Motorsport	18	(United Kingdom) Seb Hopkins	All
Elite Motorsport	30	(United Kingdom) Will Jenkins	All
Elite Motorsport	78	(United Kingdom) Jack Sherwood	All
Elite Motorsport	93	(United Kingdom) Max Hall	All
Elite Motorsport	95	(United Kingdom) Joe Warhurst	All
R Racing	11	(Mexico) Ian Aguilera	All
R Racing	14	(United Kingdom) Josh Miller	All
R Racing	35	(Switzerland) Callum Voisin	All
R Racing	37	(United Kingdom) Luke Watts	7–9
R Racing	52	(United Kingdom) Tom Edgar	1–4
R Racing	62	(United Kingdom) Freddie Tomlinson	All
R Racing	70	(United Kingdom) Aston Millar	All
Preptech UK	12	(United Kingdom) James Higgins	All
Preptech UK	13	(United Kingdom) Haydn Chance	7–9
Preptech UK	71	(United Kingdom) Fergus Chalmers	All
Richardson Racing	17	(United Kingdom) Oliver Flashman	1–6
Richardson Racing	41	(United Kingdom) Edward Pearson	All
Richardson Racing	46	(Netherlands) Robert de Haan	All
Assetto Motorsport	23	(United Kingdom) Harri Reynolds	All
Assetto Motorsport	24	(United Kingdom) Jamie Osborne	All
Assetto Motorsport	33	(United Kingdom) Maxwell Dodds	1–6, 8–9
Assetto Motorsport	88	(United Kingdom) Joe Wheeler	All
Race Car Consultants	26	(United Kingdom) Thomas Jack Lee	7, 9
Race Car Consultants	94	(United Kingdom) Jacob Hodgkiss	All
Breakell Racing	47	(South Africa) Aqil Alibhai	All
Fox Motorsport	48	(United Kingdom) Liam McNeilly	All
Fox Motorsport	49	(United Kingdom) Maurice Henry	All
Privateer	50	(United Kingdom) Adam Brown	1–3
Ultimate Speed Racing	50	(United Kingdom) Adam Brown	5–9
Hybrid Tune Ltd	72	(United Kingdom) Sonny Smith	8–9
Team HARD	77	(United Kingdom) AJ Rock	7–9
Raceway Motorsport	81	(United Kingdom) Zac Meakin	1–5, 7–9

== Race calendar ==
Round	Circuit	Date	Map of circuit locations
1	(United Kingdom) Thruxton Circuit, Hampshire	8–9 May	2021 Ginetta Junior Championship (the United Kingdom)
2	(United Kingdom) Snetterton, Norfolk (300 Circuit)	12–13 June	2021 Ginetta Junior Championship (the United Kingdom)
3	(United Kingdom) Brands Hatch, Kent (Indy Circuit)	26–27 June	2021 Ginetta Junior Championship (the United Kingdom)
4	(United Kingdom) Oulton Park, Cheshire (Island Circuit)	31 July – 1 August	2021 Ginetta Junior Championship (the United Kingdom)
5	(United Kingdom) Knockhill Circuit, Fife	14–15 August	2021 Ginetta Junior Championship (the United Kingdom)
6	(United Kingdom) Thruxton Circuit, Hampshire	28–29 August	2021 Ginetta Junior Championship (the United Kingdom)
7	(United Kingdom) Silverstone, Northamptonshire	25–26 September	2021 Ginetta Junior Championship (the United Kingdom)
8	(United Kingdom) Donington Park, Leicestershire (National Circuit)	8–9 October	2021 Ginetta Junior Championship (the United Kingdom)
9	(United Kingdom) Brands Hatch, Kent (Grand Prix Circuit)	8–9 October	2021 Ginetta Junior Championship (the United Kingdom)

Calendar Changes

The Ginetta Junior Championship will not support every round of the British Touring Car Championship in 2021. The series will miss the seventh round of the BTCC season at Croft.

Midseason Changes

Round 10 at Oulton Park was postponed due to barrier damage sustained during a Mini Challenge UK race. Due to timetable constraints the rescheduled race could not take place that weekend, so it was subsequently run at the following meeting at Knockhill.

== Race results ==
Round		Circuit	Date	Pole position	Fastest lap	Winning driver	Winning team	Rookie Winner
1	R1	Thruxton Circuit, Hampshire	8 May	(United Kingdom) Aston Millar	(United Kingdom) Will Jenkins	(United Kingdom) Tom Edgar	R Racing	(Switzerland) Callum Voisin
1	R2	Thruxton Circuit, Hampshire	9 May	(United Kingdom) Seb Hopkins	(United Kingdom) Liam McNeilly	(Switzerland) Callum Voisin	R Racing	(Switzerland) Callum Voisin
2	R3	Snetterton Circuit, Norfolk (300 Circuit)	12 June	(United Kingdom) Tom Edgar	(Switzerland) Callum Voisin	(Switzerland) Callum Voisin	R Racing	(Switzerland) Callum Voisin
2	R4	Snetterton Circuit, Norfolk (300 Circuit)	12 June	(United Kingdom) Liam McNeilly	(United Kingdom) Liam McNeilly	(United Kingdom) Liam McNeilly	Fox Motorsport	(United Kingdom) Josh Rowledge
2	R5	Snetterton Circuit, Norfolk (300 Circuit)	13 June		(United Kingdom) Seb Hopkins	(United Kingdom) Tom Edgar	R Racing	(United Kingdom) Josh Rowledge
3	R6	Brands Hatch, Kent (Indy Circuit)	26 June	(Switzerland) Callum Voisin	(Switzerland) Callum Voisin	(Switzerland) Callum Voisin	R Racing	(Switzerland) Callum Voisin
3	R7	Brands Hatch, Kent (Indy Circuit)	26 June	(Switzerland) Callum Voisin	(United Kingdom) Seb Hopkins	(Switzerland) Callum Voisin	R Racing	(Switzerland) Callum Voisin
3	R8	Brands Hatch, Kent (Indy Circuit)	27 June		(Switzerland) Callum Voisin	(Switzerland) Callum Voisin	R Racing	(Switzerland) Callum Voisin
4	R9	Oulton Park, Cheshire (Island Circuit)	31 July	(United Kingdom) Josh Rowledge	(United Kingdom) Aston Millar	(United Kingdom) Liam McNeilly	Fox Motorsport	(United Kingdom) Josh Rowledge
4	R10	Oulton Park, Cheshire (Island Circuit)	1 August	Race postponed to Knockhill due to barrier damage				
5	R11	Knockhill Circuit, Fife	14 August	(United Kingdom) Liam McNeilly	(United Kingdom) Josh Rowledge	(United Kingdom) Liam McNeilly	Fox Motorsport	(Netherlands) Robert de Haan
5	R10	Knockhill Circuit, Fife	14 August	(United Kingdom) Josh Rowledge	(Netherlands) Robert de Haan	(Switzerland) Callum Voisin	R Racing	(Switzerland) Callum Voisin
5	R12	Knockhill Circuit, Fife	15 August	(United Kingdom) Liam McNeilly	(Netherlands) Robert de Haan	(United Kingdom) Aston Millar	R Racing	(Switzerland) Callum Voisin
5	R13	Knockhill Circuit, Fife	15 August		(Switzerland) Callum Voisin	(United Kingdom) Aston Millar	R Racing	(Netherlands) Robert de Haan
6	R14	Thruxton Circuit, Hampshire	28 August	(Switzerland) Callum Voisin	(Netherlands) Robert de Haan	(Netherlands) Robert de Haan	Richardson Racing	(Netherlands) Robert de Haan
6	R15	Thruxton Circuit, Hampshire	29 August	(United Kingdom) Will Jenkins	(United Kingdom) Freddie Tomlinson	(Switzerland) Callum Voisin	R Racing	(Switzerland) Callum Voisin
6	R16	Thruxton Circuit, Hampshire	29 August		(Switzerland) Callum Voisin	(Netherlands) Robert de Haan	Richardson Racing	(Netherlands) Robert de Haan
7	R17	Silverstone, Northamptonshire	25 September	(United Kingdom) Aston Millar	(United Kingdom) Freddie Tomlinson	(Netherlands) Robert de Haan	Richardson Racing	(Netherlands) Robert de Haan
7	R18	Silverstone, Northamptonshire	26 September	(United Kingdom) Aston Millar	(United Kingdom) Will Jenkins	(United Kingdom) Will Jenkins	Elite Motorsport	(Netherlands) Robert de Haan
7	R19	Silverstone, Northamptonshire	26 September		(Netherlands) Robert de Haan	(United Kingdom) Aston Millar	R Racing	(Netherlands) Robert de Haan
8	R20	Donington Park, Leicestershire (National Circuit)	9 October	(United Kingdom) Aston Millar	(United Kingdom) Harri Reynolds	(United Kingdom) Liam McNeilly	Fox Motorsport	(Netherlands) Robert de Haan
8	R21	Donington Park, Leicestershire (National Circuit)	10 October	(United Kingdom) Liam McNeilly	(Switzerland) Callum Voisin	(United Kingdom) Aston Millar	R Racing	(Netherlands) Robert de Haan
8	R22	Donington Park, Leicestershire (National Circuit)	10 October		(Netherlands) Robert de Haan	(United Kingdom) Aston Millar	R Racing	(Switzerland) Callum Voisin
9	R23	Brands Hatch, Kent (Grand Prix Circuit)	23 October	(United Kingdom) Aston Millar	(United Kingdom) James Higgins	(United Kingdom) Aston Millar	R Racing	(Netherlands) Robert de Haan
9	R24	Brands Hatch, Kent (Grand Prix Circuit)	24 October		(United Kingdom) Aston Millar	(United Kingdom) Aston Millar	R Racing	(United Kingdom) James Higgins
9	R25	Brands Hatch, Kent (Grand Prix Circuit)	24 October		(United Kingdom) Liam McNeilly	(United Kingdom) Liam McNeilly	Fox Motorsport	(Netherlands) Robert de Haan

== Championship standings ==
Points system
1st	2nd	3rd	4th	5th	6th	7th	8th	9th	10th	11th	12th	13th	14th	15th	16th	17th	18th	19th	20th	R1 PP	FL
35	30	26	22	20	18	16	14	12	11	10	9	8	7	6	5	4	3	2	1	1	1

=== Drivers' championship ===
- A driver's best 19 scores counted towards the championship, with any other points being discarded.

Pos	Driver	THR		SNE			BHI			OUL		KNO				THR			SIL			DON			BHGP			Total	Drop	Pen.	Points
1	(United Kingdom) Aston Millar	4	2	5	6	5	5	5	6	3	C	2	2	1	1	5	3	5	4	2	1	2	1	1	1	1	8	667	14		653
2	(United Kingdom) Liam McNeilly	10	10	3	1	2	2	6	7	1	C	1	3	4	4	3	4	7	6	7	5	1	2	2	5	2	1	619	11		608
3	(United Kingdom) Seb Hopkins	2	3	Ret	4	7	3	2	2	8	C	3	19	2	2	4	2	3	3	4	7	10	4	10	4	13	7	516			516
4	(Netherlands) Robert de Haan (R)	9	4	10	8	Ret	8	7	5	Ret	C	4	4	8	3	1	6	1	1	3	2	4	3	5	2	10	2	516		9	507
5	(United Kingdom) Will Jenkins	7	6	2	3	3	6	4	4	7	C	5	5	22	Ret	2	17	11	2	1	3	7	8	7	6	3	4	484			484
6	(Switzerland) Callum Voisin (R)	5	1	1	DSQ	10	1	1	1	9	C	9	1	3	5	22	1	2	22	15	6	13	7	3	3	21	13	491		76	415
7	(United Kingdom) Josh Rowledge (R)	11	7	6	7	6	7	9	Ret	4	C	6	8	6	6	21	5	12	12	6	4	8	5	6	10	9	6	369		6	363
8	(United Kingdom) Josh Miller	3	9	9	5	4	18	3	3	2	C	17	7	Ret	DNS	15	11	6	7	8	23	12	18	12	7	15	12	313		15	298
9	(United Kingdom) Freddie Tomlinson	8	12	11	11	11	11	12	11	5	C	Ret	12	5	7	13	9	9	9	9	9	11	12	11	11	7	5	292			292
10	(United Kingdom) Joe Wheeler	6	8	7	9	Ret	13	Ret	19	21	C	10	16	7	9	8	7	4	17	Ret	13	5	9	9	13	5	27	250		6	244
11	(United Kingdom) Harri Reynolds (R)	16	14	14	12	12	15	14	12	6	C	7	6	12	8	12	20	13	8	10	Ret	6	6	4	9	17	18	255		12	243
12	(United Kingdom) Jamie Osborne	17	16	12	13	8	12	11	9	10	C	12	10	14	11	14	19	15	26	5	10	3	20	17	8	19	23	212		6	206
13	(United Kingdom) Maxwell Dodds (R)	15	11	8	10	9	10	10	8	22	C	11	9	11	14	9	8	10				15	10	8	Ret	20	19	199			199
14	(United Kingdom) Tom Edgar	1	5	4	2	1	4	8	10	17	C																	194		18	176
15	(United Kingdom) James Higgins (R)	24	18	13	17	Ret	16	16	14	13	C	Ret	17	9	10	19	23	DNS	11	12	8	14	21	18	23	4	10	146			146
16	(South Africa) Aqil Alibhai (R)	18	25	23	19	21	26	21	Ret	12	C	8	20	17	15	6	12	14	14	22	18	9	17	13	14	16	9	131			131
17	(United Kingdom) Edward Pearson (R)	20	17	18	22	14	Ret	Ret	17	14	C	Ret	13	13	13	11	14	21	15	13	12	Ret	13	20	15	8	3	145		20	125
18	(United Kingdom) Joe Warhurst (R)	Ret	23	15	25	13	17	20	21	18	C	19	14	21	17	7	10	8	5	11	Ret	19	Ret	22	12	5	20	118			118
19	(United Kingdom) Fergus Chalmers (R)	19	20	26	16	Ret	25	23	23	16	C	13	21	16	18	10	15	19	13	Ret	20	16	22	19	21	6	11	92			92
20	(United Kingdom) Zac Meakin (R)	13	15	21	15	17	14	18	16	Ret	C	Ret	11	Ret	DNS				23	14	16	18	11	14	19	18	15	92			92
21	(United Kingdom) Maurice Henry (R)	23	Ret	20	20	19	20	13	13	11	C	Ret	15	10	12	20	21	17	20	18	15	23	14	26	16	Ret	16	89		18	71
22	(Mexico) Ian Aguilera (R)	14	19	19	23	Ret	9	Ret	DNS	23	C	20	22	19	22	24	18	18	10	19	11	20	26	15	18	26	21	65			65
23	(United Kingdom) Max Hall (R)	12	13	17	14	15	21	17	22	20	C	15	25	15	16	Ret	13	Ret	16	20	21	17	19	24	22	Ret	28	76		15	61
24	(United Kingdom) Jack Sherwood (R)	22	22	22	21	16	19	19	24	19	C	14	18	Ret	19	18	16	16	19	23	17	Ret	27	25	20	14	25	50			50
25	(United Kingdom) Jacob Hodgkiss (R)	21	21	16	18	20	23	15	15	24	C	Ret	23	18	23	17	24	20	27	17	14	21	15	NC	Ret	Ret	22	46		12	34
26	(United Kingdom) Luke Watts (R)																		21	16	19	Ret	Ret	16	Ret	12	14	28			28
27	(United Kingdom) Sonny Smith (R)																					25	16	23	17	11	17	23			23
28	(United Kingdom) Oliver Flashman (R)	25	24	24	26	Ret	24	24	18	15	C	16	24	20	21	16	22	23										20			20
29	(United Kingdom) Adam Brown (R)	26	26	25	24	18	22	22	20			18		23	20	23	25	22	25	24	25	22	23	28	25	24	24	8			8
30	(United Kingdom) Thomas Jack Lee (R)																		18	21	26				Ret	25	Ret	3			3
31	(United Kingdom) AJ Rock (R)																		24	Ret	24	24	24	21	26	22	29	0			0
32	(United Kingdom) Haydn Chance (R)																		Ret	Ret	22	26	25	27	24	23	26	0			0
