= 2022 British GT Championship =

Sports car racing season

The 2022 British GT Championship (known for sponsorship reasons as the 2022 Intelligent Money British GT Championship) was the 30th British GT Championship, a sports car championship promoted by the SRO Motorsports Group. The season began on 16 April at Oulton Park and ended on 16 October at Donington Park.

== Calendar ==
The calendar was unveiled on 15 September 2021.

Round	Circuit	Length	Date
1	(United Kingdom) Oulton Park, Cheshire	60 min	16–18 April
2	(United Kingdom) Oulton Park, Cheshire	60 min	16–18 April
3	(United Kingdom) Silverstone Circuit, Northamptonshire	180 min	7–8 May
4	(United Kingdom) Donington Park, Leicestershire	180 min	28–29 May
5	(United Kingdom) Snetterton Circuit, Norfolk	60 min	25–26 June
6	(United Kingdom) Snetterton Circuit, Norfolk	60 min	25–26 June
7	Circuit de Spa-Francorchamps, Spa, Belgium	120 min	23–24 July
8	(United Kingdom) Brands Hatch, Kent	120 min	10–11 September
9	(United Kingdom) Donington Park, Leicestershire	120 min	15–16 October

== Entry list ==
=== GT3 ===
Team	Car	Engine	No.	Drivers	Class		Rounds
Team	Car	Engine	No.	Drivers	Car	Driver	Rounds
(United Kingdom) Jenson Team Rocket RJN	McLaren 720S GT3	McLaren M840T 4.0 L Turbo V8	2	(United Kingdom) James Kell	GT3	S	All
(United Kingdom) Jenson Team Rocket RJN	McLaren 720S GT3	McLaren M840T 4.0 L Turbo V8	2	(United Kingdom) Graham Davidson	GT3	S	1–2
(United Kingdom) Jenson Team Rocket RJN	McLaren 720S GT3	McLaren M840T 4.0 L Turbo V8	2	(United Kingdom) Simon Watts	GT3	S	3–9
(United Kingdom) Assetto Motorsport	Bentley Continental GT3	Bentley 4.0 L Turbo V8	3	(United Kingdom) Mark Sansom	GT3	S	1–7
(United Kingdom) Assetto Motorsport	Bentley Continental GT3	Bentley 4.0 L Turbo V8	3	(United Kingdom) William Tregurtha	GT3	S	1–7
(Bahrain) 2 Seas Motorsport	Mercedes-AMG GT3 Evo	Mercedes-AMG M159 6.2 L V8	4	(United Kingdom) James Cottingham	GT3	PA	All
(Bahrain) 2 Seas Motorsport	Mercedes-AMG GT3 Evo	Mercedes-AMG M159 6.2 L V8	4	(United Kingdom) Lewis Williamson	GT3	PA	All
(Bahrain) 2 Seas Motorsport	Mercedes-AMG GT3 Evo	Mercedes-AMG M159 6.2 L V8	20	(United Kingdom) Graham Davidson	GT3	S	9
(Bahrain) 2 Seas Motorsport	Mercedes-AMG GT3 Evo	Mercedes-AMG M159 6.2 L V8	20	(United Kingdom) Aaron Walker	GT3	S	9
(Bahrain) 2 Seas Motorsport	Mercedes-AMG GT3 Evo	Mercedes-AMG M159 6.2 L V8	75	(United Kingdom) Flick Haigh	GT3	PA	3, 5–6
(Bahrain) 2 Seas Motorsport	Mercedes-AMG GT3 Evo	Mercedes-AMG M159 6.2 L V8	75	(United Kingdom) Jonathan Adam	GT3	PA	3, 5–6
(United Kingdom) Greystone GT	McLaren 720S GT3	McLaren M840T 4.0 L Turbo V8	5	(United Kingdom) Stewart Proctor	GT3	S	All
(United Kingdom) Greystone GT	McLaren 720S GT3	McLaren M840T 4.0 L Turbo V8	5	(United Kingdom) Lewis Proctor	GT3	S	1–8
(United Kingdom) Greystone GT	McLaren 720S GT3	McLaren M840T 4.0 L Turbo V8	5	(United Kingdom) Warren Hughes	GT3	S	9
(United Kingdom) Greystone GT	McLaren 720S GT3	McLaren M840T 4.0 L Turbo V8	17	(United Kingdom) Iain Campbell	GT3	PA	7
(United Kingdom) Greystone GT	McLaren 720S GT3	McLaren M840T 4.0 L Turbo V8	17	(United Kingdom) Oliver Webb	GT3	PA	7
(United Kingdom) Greystone GT	McLaren 720S GT3	McLaren M840T 4.0 L Turbo V8	24	(Estonia) Andrey Borodin	GT3	S	8–9
(United Kingdom) Greystone GT	McLaren 720S GT3	McLaren M840T 4.0 L Turbo V8	24	(United Kingdom) Ed Pead	GT3	S	8–9
(United Kingdom) RAM Racing	Mercedes-AMG GT3 Evo	Mercedes-AMG M159 6.2 L V8	6	(United Kingdom) Ian Loggie	GT3	PA	All
(United Kingdom) RAM Racing	Mercedes-AMG GT3 Evo	Mercedes-AMG M159 6.2 L V8	6	(France) Jules Gounon	GT3	PA	1–2, 7, 9
(United Kingdom) RAM Racing	Mercedes-AMG GT3 Evo	Mercedes-AMG M159 6.2 L V8	6	(United Kingdom) Callum MacLeod	GT3	PA	3–6, 8
(United Kingdom) RAM Racing	Mercedes-AMG GT3 Evo	Mercedes-AMG M159 6.2 L V8	15	(United Kingdom) John Ferguson	GT3	S	1–8
(United Kingdom) RAM Racing	Mercedes-AMG GT3 Evo	Mercedes-AMG M159 6.2 L V8	15	(United Kingdom) Jamie Caroline	GT3	S	1–3
(United Kingdom) RAM Racing	Mercedes-AMG GT3 Evo	Mercedes-AMG M159 6.2 L V8	15	(Belgium) Ulysse de Pauw	GT3	S	4–8
(United Kingdom) Team ABBA Racing	Mercedes-AMG GT3	Mercedes-AMG M159 6.2 L V8	8	(United Kingdom) Richard Neary	GT3	S	All
(United Kingdom) Team ABBA Racing	Mercedes-AMG GT3	Mercedes-AMG M159 6.2 L V8	8	(United Kingdom) Sam Neary	GT3	S	All
(United Kingdom) Paddock Motorsport	McLaren 720S GT3	McLaren M840T 4.0 L Turbo V8	11	(United Kingdom) Martin Plowman	GT3	PA	All
(United Kingdom) Paddock Motorsport	McLaren 720S GT3	McLaren M840T 4.0 L Turbo V8	11	(United Kingdom) Kelvin Fletcher	GT3	PA	1–2, 4, 8
(United Kingdom) Paddock Motorsport	McLaren 720S GT3	McLaren M840T 4.0 L Turbo V8	11	(United Kingdom) Andrew Howard	GT3	PA	3
(United Kingdom) Paddock Motorsport	McLaren 720S GT3	McLaren M840T 4.0 L Turbo V8	11	(United Kingdom) Graham Davidson	GT3	PA	5–7
(United Kingdom) Paddock Motorsport	McLaren 720S GT3	McLaren M840T 4.0 L Turbo V8	11	(United Kingdom) Mark Smith	GT3	PA	9
(United Kingdom) WPI Motorsport	Lamborghini Huracán GT3 Evo	Lamborghini 5.2 L V10	18	(United Kingdom) Michael Igoe	GT3	PA	1–7
(United Kingdom) WPI Motorsport	Lamborghini Huracán GT3 Evo	Lamborghini 5.2 L V10	18	(United Kingdom) Phil Keen	GT3	PA	1–7
(United Kingdom) Balfe Motorsport	Audi R8 LMS Evo II	Audi 5.2 L V10	22	(United Kingdom) Shaun Balfe	GT3	PA	1–4
(United Kingdom) Balfe Motorsport	Audi R8 LMS Evo II	Audi 5.2 L V10	22	(United Kingdom) Adam Carroll	GT3	PA	1–4
(United Kingdom) Optimum Motorsport	McLaren 720S GT3	McLaren M840T 4.0 L Turbo V8	28	(United Kingdom) Nick Moss	GT3	PA	3
(United Kingdom) Optimum Motorsport	McLaren 720S GT3	McLaren M840T 4.0 L Turbo V8	28	(United Kingdom) Joe Osborne	GT3	PA	3
(United Kingdom) Redline Racing	Lamborghini Huracán GT3 Evo	Lamborghini 5.2 L V10	32	(United Kingdom) James Dorlin	GT3	S	1–6, 8
(United Kingdom) Redline Racing	Lamborghini Huracán GT3 Evo	Lamborghini 5.2 L V10	32	(United Kingdom) Alex Malykhin (Note: Alex Malykhin is Belarusian, but competes under a British licence as Belarusian national emblems were banned by the association due to the Russian invasion of Ukraine.)	GT3	S	1–6, 8
(Germany) Allied Racing operated by Redline	Porsche 911 GT3 R	Porsche 4.0 L Flat-6	32	(United Kingdom) James Dorlin	GT3	S	7
(Germany) Allied Racing operated by Redline	Porsche 911 GT3 R	Porsche 4.0 L Flat-6	32	(United Kingdom) Alex Malykhin	GT3	S	7
(United Kingdom) Fox Motorsport	McLaren 720S GT3	McLaren M840T 4.0 L Turbo V8	40	(United Kingdom) Nick Halstead	GT3	PA	All
(United Kingdom) Fox Motorsport	McLaren 720S GT3	McLaren M840T 4.0 L Turbo V8	40	(United Kingdom) Jamie Stanley	GT3	PA	1–3, 5–9
(United Kingdom) Fox Motorsport	McLaren 720S GT3	McLaren M840T 4.0 L Turbo V8	40	(United Kingdom) Rob Bell	GT3	PA	4
(United Kingdom) Team Parker Racing	Porsche 911 GT3 R	Porsche 4.0 L Flat-6	66	(United Kingdom) Nick Jones	GT3	PA	1–8
(United Kingdom) Team Parker Racing	Porsche 911 GT3 R	Porsche 4.0 L Flat-6	66	(United Kingdom) Scott Malvern	GT3	PA	1–8
(United Kingdom) Orange Racing powered by JMH	McLaren 720S GT3	McLaren M840T 4.0 L Turbo V8	67	(United Kingdom) Simon Orange	GT3	PA	9
(United Kingdom) Orange Racing powered by JMH	McLaren 720S GT3	McLaren M840T 4.0 L Turbo V8	67	(United Kingdom) Michael O'Brien	GT3	PA	9
(United Kingdom) Barwell Motorsport	Lamborghini Huracán GT3 Evo	Lamborghini 5.2 L V10	72	(United Kingdom) Adam Balon	GT3	PA	All
(United Kingdom) Barwell Motorsport	Lamborghini Huracán GT3 Evo	Lamborghini 5.2 L V10	72	(United Kingdom) Sandy Mitchell	GT3	PA	All
(United Kingdom) 7TSIX	McLaren 720S GT3	McLaren M840T 4.0 L Turbo V8	76	(Sweden) Mia Flewitt	GT3	PA	All
(United Kingdom) 7TSIX	McLaren 720S GT3	McLaren M840T 4.0 L Turbo V8	76	(United Kingdom) Euan Hankey	GT3	PA	All
(United Kingdom) Enduro Motorsport	McLaren 720S GT3	McLaren M840T 4.0 L Turbo V8	77	(United Kingdom) Marcus Clutton	GT3	PA	All
(United Kingdom) Enduro Motorsport	McLaren 720S GT3	McLaren M840T 4.0 L Turbo V8	77	(United Kingdom) Morgan Tillbrook	GT3	PA	All
(United Kingdom) Garage 59	McLaren 720S GT3	McLaren M840T 4.0 L Turbo V8	88	(Germany) Marvin Kirchhöfer	GT3	PA	3
(United Kingdom) Garage 59	McLaren 720S GT3	McLaren M840T 4.0 L Turbo V8	88	(Sweden) Alexander West	GT3	PA	3
(United Kingdom) Century Motorsport	BMW M4 GT3	BMW S58B30T0 3.0 L Twin Turbo I6	91	(Taiwan) Betty Chen	GT3	S	1–4
(United Kingdom) Century Motorsport	BMW M4 GT3	BMW S58B30T0 3.0 L Twin Turbo I6	91	(United Kingdom) Angus Fender	GT3	S	1–4
(United Kingdom) Century Motorsport	BMW M4 GT3	BMW S58B30T0 3.0 L Twin Turbo I6	91	(Taiwan) Betty Chen	GT3	PA	5–6
(United Kingdom) Century Motorsport	BMW M4 GT3	BMW S58B30T0 3.0 L Twin Turbo I6	91	(Sweden) Joel Eriksson	GT3	PA	5–7
(United Kingdom) Century Motorsport	BMW M4 GT3	BMW S58B30T0 3.0 L Twin Turbo I6	91	(United Kingdom) David Holloway	GT3	PA	7
(United Kingdom) Century Motorsport	BMW M4 GT3	BMW S58B30T0 3.0 L Twin Turbo I6	91	(United Kingdom) Alexander Sims	GT3	PA	8–9
(United Kingdom) Century Motorsport	BMW M4 GT3	BMW S58B30T0 3.0 L Twin Turbo I6	91	(United Kingdom) Henry Dawes	GT3	PA	8
(United Kingdom) Century Motorsport	BMW M4 GT3	BMW S58B30T0 3.0 L Twin Turbo I6	91	(United Kingdom) Darren Leung	GT3	PA	9
(United Kingdom) Sky - Tempesta Racing	Mercedes-AMG GT3 Evo	Mercedes-AMG M159 6.2 L V8	93	(United Kingdom) Chris Froggatt	GT3	S	1–3, 8
(United Kingdom) Sky - Tempesta Racing	Mercedes-AMG GT3 Evo	Mercedes-AMG M159 6.2 L V8	93	(Macau) Kevin Tse	GT3	S	1–3
(United Kingdom) Sky - Tempesta Racing	Mercedes-AMG GT3 Evo	Mercedes-AMG M159 6.2 L V8	93	(United Kingdom) Andrew Howard	GT3	S	8
(United Kingdom) Beechdean AMR	Aston Martin Vantage AMR GT3	Aston Martin 4.0 L Turbo V8	97	(United Kingdom) Andrew Howard	GT3	S	9
(United Kingdom) Beechdean AMR	Aston Martin Vantage AMR GT3	Aston Martin 4.0 L Turbo V8	97	(United Kingdom) Lewis Proctor	GT3	S	9

Icon	Class
Car
GT3	GT3 Cars
GTC	GTC Cars
Drivers
PA	Pro-Am Cup
S	Silver-Am Cup
Am	Am Cup

=== GT4 ===
Team	Car	Engine	No.	Drivers	Class	Rounds
(United Kingdom) Motus One Racing	McLaren 570S GT4	McLaren 3.8 L Turbo V8	7	(United Kingdom) Michael Broadhurst	PA	3–6
(United Kingdom) Motus One Racing	McLaren 570S GT4	McLaren 3.8 L Turbo V8	7	(United Kingdom) Ed McDermott	PA	3–6
(United Kingdom) Motus One Racing	McLaren 570S GT4	McLaren 3.8 L Turbo V8	7	(United Kingdom) Michael Broadhurst	S	7
(United Kingdom) Motus One Racing	McLaren 570S GT4	McLaren 3.8 L Turbo V8	7	(United Kingdom) James Wallis	S	7
(United Kingdom) Motus One Racing	Mercedes-AMG GT4	Mercedes-AMG M178 4.0 L V8	7	(United Kingdom) Ed McDermott	PA	8–9
(United Kingdom) Motus One Racing	Mercedes-AMG GT4	Mercedes-AMG M178 4.0 L V8	7	(United Kingdom) Michael Broadhurst	PA	8–9
(United Kingdom) Century Motorsport	Aston Martin Vantage AMR GT4	Aston Martin 4.0 L Turbo V8	21	(United Kingdom) Bradley Ellis	PA	3
(United Kingdom) Century Motorsport	Aston Martin Vantage AMR GT4	Aston Martin 4.0 L Turbo V8	21	(United Kingdom) David Holloway	PA	3
(United Kingdom) Century Motorsport	BMW M4 GT4	BMW N55 3.0 L Twin-Turbo I6	9	(United Kingdom) Tom Rawlings	S	All
(United Kingdom) Century Motorsport	BMW M4 GT4	BMW N55 3.0 L Twin-Turbo I6	9	(United Kingdom) Chris Salkeld	S	All
(United Kingdom) Century Motorsport	BMW M4 GT4	BMW N55 3.0 L Twin-Turbo I6	90	(United Kingdom) Jack Brown	S	All
(United Kingdom) Century Motorsport	BMW M4 GT4	BMW N55 3.0 L Twin-Turbo I6	90	(United Kingdom) Will Burns	S	All
(United Kingdom) Assetto Motorsport	Ginetta G56 GT4	GM LS3 6.2 L V8	10	(United Kingdom) Darren Leung	PA	8
(United Kingdom) Assetto Motorsport	Ginetta G56 GT4	GM LS3 6.2 L V8	10	(United Kingdom) Charlie Robertson	PA	8
(United Kingdom) Assetto Motorsport	Ginetta G56 GT4	GM LS3 6.2 L V8	56	(United Kingdom) Freddie Tomlinson	S	All
(United Kingdom) Assetto Motorsport	Ginetta G56 GT4	GM LS3 6.2 L V8	56	(United Kingdom) Joe Wheeler	S	All
(Netherlands) Inspire Racing	Ekris M4 GT4	BMW N55 3.0 L Twin-Turbo I6	14	(United Kingdom) Gareth Howell	PA	1–2
(Netherlands) Inspire Racing	Ekris M4 GT4	BMW N55 3.0 L Twin-Turbo I6	14	(United Kingdom) Richard Marsh	PA	1–2
(United Kingdom) R Racing	Aston Martin Vantage AMR GT4	Aston Martin 4.0 L Turbo V8	23	(United Arab Emirates) Jamie Day	S	All
(United Kingdom) R Racing	Aston Martin Vantage AMR GT4	Aston Martin 4.0 L Turbo V8	23	(United Kingdom) Josh Miller	S	All
(United Kingdom) Paddock Motorsport	McLaren 570S GT4	McLaren 3.8 L Turbo V8	26	(United Kingdom) Moh Ritson	S	1–8
(United Kingdom) Paddock Motorsport	McLaren 570S GT4	McLaren 3.8 L Turbo V8	26	(United Kingdom) Ashley Marshall	S	1–7
(United Kingdom) Paddock Motorsport	McLaren 570S GT4	McLaren 3.8 L Turbo V8	26	(United Kingdom) Adam Hatfield	S	8
(United Kingdom) Paddock Motorsport	McLaren 570S GT4	McLaren 3.8 L Turbo V8	26	(United Kingdom) Moh Ritson	PA	9
(United Kingdom) Paddock Motorsport	McLaren 570S GT4	McLaren 3.8 L Turbo V8	26	(United Kingdom) Kavi Jundu	PA	9
(United Kingdom) Newbridge Motorsport	Aston Martin Vantage AMR GT4	Aston Martin 4.0 L Turbo V8	27	(United Kingdom) Matt Topham	PA	All
(United Kingdom) Newbridge Motorsport	Aston Martin Vantage AMR GT4	Aston Martin 4.0 L Turbo V8	27	(United Kingdom) Darren Turner	PA	All
(Germany) Allied Racing by Herberth	Porsche 718 Cayman GT4 RS Clubsport	Porsche 4.0 L Flat-6	33	(Hong Kong) Antares Au	Am	7
(Germany) Allied Racing by Herberth	Porsche 718 Cayman GT4 RS Clubsport	Porsche 4.0 L Flat-6	33	(Macau) Kevin Tse	Am	7
(United Kingdom) Steller Performance	Audi R8 LMS GT4 Evo	Audi 5.2 L V10	42	(United Kingdom) Sennan Fielding	S	All
(United Kingdom) Steller Performance	Audi R8 LMS GT4 Evo	Audi 5.2 L V10	42	(United Kingdom) Richard Williams	S	All
(Japan) Toyota Gazoo Racing UK	Toyota GR Supra GT4	BMW B58B30 3.0 L Twin Turbo I6	48	(Republic of Ireland) Tom Edgar	S	All
(Japan) Toyota Gazoo Racing UK	Toyota GR Supra GT4	BMW B58B30 3.0 L Twin Turbo I6	48	(United Kingdom) Jack Mitchell	S	1–2
(Japan) Toyota Gazoo Racing UK	Toyota GR Supra GT4	BMW B58B30 3.0 L Twin Turbo I6	48	(United Kingdom) Jordan Collard	S	3–9
(United Kingdom) Valluga Racing	Porsche 718 Cayman GT4 RS Clubsport	Porsche 4.0 L Flat-6	51	(United Kingdom) Benji Hetherington	S	1–2
(United Kingdom) Valluga Racing	Porsche 718 Cayman GT4 RS Clubsport	Porsche 4.0 L Flat-6	51	(United Kingdom) Ross Wylie	S	1–6
(United Kingdom) Valluga Racing	Porsche 718 Cayman GT4 RS Clubsport	Porsche 4.0 L Flat-6	51	(United Kingdom) Matthew Graham	S	3–6
(United Kingdom) Valluga Racing	Porsche 718 Cayman GT4 RS Clubsport	Porsche 4.0 L Flat-6	51	(United Kingdom) Benji Hetherington	PA	7–9
(United Kingdom) Valluga Racing	Porsche 718 Cayman GT4 RS Clubsport	Porsche 4.0 L Flat-6	51	(United Kingdom) Lucky Khera	PA	7
(United Kingdom) Valluga Racing	Porsche 718 Cayman GT4 RS Clubsport	Porsche 4.0 L Flat-6	51	(United Kingdom) Mark Radcliffe	PA	8
(United Kingdom) Valluga Racing	Porsche 718 Cayman GT4 RS Clubsport	Porsche 4.0 L Flat-6	51	(United Kingdom) Adam Knight	PA	9
(United Kingdom) Academy Motorsport	Ford Mustang GT4	Ford 5.2 L Voodoo V8	61	(United Kingdom) Matt Cowley	S	All
(United Kingdom) Academy Motorsport	Ford Mustang GT4	Ford 5.2 L Voodoo V8	61	(Canada) Marco Signoretti	S	All
(United Kingdom) Academy Motorsport	Ford Mustang GT4	Ford 5.2 L Voodoo V8	62	(United Kingdom) Will Moore	S	9
(United Kingdom) Academy Motorsport	Ford Mustang GT4	Ford 5.2 L Voodoo V8	62	(United States) Erik Evans	S	9
(United Kingdom) Team Parker Racing	Porsche 718 Cayman GT4 RS Clubsport	Porsche 4.0 L Flat-6	65	(United Kingdom) Seb Hopkins	S	All
(United Kingdom) Team Parker Racing	Porsche 718 Cayman GT4 RS Clubsport	Porsche 4.0 L Flat-6	65	(United Kingdom) Jamie Orton	S	All
(United Kingdom) Team BRIT	McLaren 570S GT4	McLaren 3.8 L Turbo V8	68	(United Kingdom) Aaron Morgan	PA	All
(United Kingdom) Team BRIT	McLaren 570S GT4	McLaren 3.8 L Turbo V8	68	(United Kingdom) Bobby Trundley	PA	All

Icon	Class
PA	Pro-Am Cup
S	Silver Cup
Am	Am Cup

== Race results ==
Bold indicates overall winner for each car class (GT3 and GT4).

=== GT3 ===
Event	Circuit	Pole position	Pro-Am winners	Silver-Am winners
1	Oulton Park	(United Kingdom) No. 22 Balfe Motorsport	**(United Kingdom) No. 22 Balfe Motorsport**	(United Kingdom) No. 3 Assetto Motorsport
1	Oulton Park	(United Kingdom) Shaun Balfe (United Kingdom) Adam Carroll	**(United Kingdom) Shaun Balfe** **(United Kingdom) Adam Carroll**	(United Kingdom) Mark Sansom (United Kingdom) William Tregurtha
2	Oulton Park	(United Kingdom) No. 6 RAM Racing	**(United Kingdom) No. 6 RAM Racing**	(United Kingdom) No. 8 Team ABBA Racing
2	Oulton Park	(France) Jules Gounon (United Kingdom) Ian Loggie	**(France) Jules Gounon** **(United Kingdom) Ian Loggie**	(United Kingdom) Richard Neary (United Kingdom) Sam Neary
3	Silverstone	(United Kingdom) No. 72 Barwell Motorsport	**(United Kingdom) No. 72 Barwell Motorsport**	(United Kingdom) No. 32 Redline Racing
3	Silverstone	(United Kingdom) Adam Balon (United Kingdom) Sandy Mitchell	**(United Kingdom) Adam Balon** **(United Kingdom) Sandy Mitchell**	(United Kingdom) James Dorlin (United Kingdom) Alex Malykhin
4	Donington Park	(United Kingdom) No. 77 Enduro Motorsport	**(United Kingdom) No. 77 Enduro Motorsport**	(United Kingdom) No. 32 Redline Racing
4	Donington Park	(United Kingdom) Marcus Clutton (United Kingdom) Morgan Tillbrook	**(United Kingdom) Marcus Clutton** **(United Kingdom) Morgan Tillbrook**	(United Kingdom) James Dorlin (United Kingdom) Alex Malykhin
5	Snetterton Circuit	(United Kingdom) No. 6 RAM Racing	**(United Kingdom) No. 6 RAM Racing**	(United Kingdom) No. 8 Team ABBA Racing
5	Snetterton Circuit	(United Kingdom) Ian Loggie (United Kingdom) Callum MacLeod	**(United Kingdom) Ian Loggie** **(United Kingdom) Callum MacLeod**	(United Kingdom) Richard Neary (United Kingdom) Sam Neary
6	Snetterton Circuit	(United Kingdom) No. 15 RAM Racing	(United Kingdom) No. 72 Barwell Motorsport	**(United Kingdom) No. 15 RAM Racing**
6	Snetterton Circuit	(Belgium) Ulysse de Pauw (United Kingdom) John Ferguson	(United Kingdom) Adam Balon (United Kingdom) Sandy Mitchell	**(Belgium) Ulysse de Pauw** **(United Kingdom) John Ferguson**
7	Spa-Francorchamps	(United Kingdom) No. 72 Barwell Motorsport	**(United Kingdom) No. 40 Fox Motorsport**	(United Kingdom) No. 32 Redline Racing
7	Spa-Francorchamps	(United Kingdom) Adam Balon (United Kingdom) Sandy Mitchell	**(United Kingdom) Nick Halstead** **(United Kingdom) Jamie Stanley**	(United Kingdom) James Dorlin (United Kingdom) Alex Malykhin
8	Brands Hatch	(Bahrain) No. 4 2 Seas Motorsport	**(United Kingdom) No. 77 Enduro Motorsport**	(United Kingdom) No. 2 Team Rocket RJN
8	Brands Hatch	(United Kingdom) James Cottingham (United Kingdom) Lewis Williamson	**(United Kingdom) Marcus Clutton** **(United Kingdom) Morgan Tillbrook**	(United Kingdom) Simon Watts (United Kingdom) James Kell
9	Donington Park	(United Kingdom) No. 8 Team ABBA Racing	**(United Kingdom) No. 91 Century Motorsport**	(United Kingdom) No. 97 Beachdean AMR
9	Donington Park	(United Kingdom) Richard Neary (United Kingdom) Sam Neary	**(United Kingdom) Darren Leung** **(United Kingdom) Alexander Sims**	(United Kingdom) Andrew Howard (United Kingdom) Lewis Proctor

=== GT4 ===
Event	Circuit	Pole position	Pro-Am winners	Silver winners
1	Oulton Park	(United Kingdom) No. 42 Steller Motorsport	(United Kingdom) No. 27 Newbridge Motorsport	**(United Kingdom) No. 42 Steller Motorsport**
1	Oulton Park	(United Kingdom) Sennan Fielding (United Kingdom) Richard Williams	(United Kingdom) Matt Topham (United Kingdom) Darren Turner	**(United Kingdom) Sennan Fielding** **(United Kingdom) Richard Williams**
2	Oulton Park	(United Kingdom) No. 27 Newbridge Motorsport	(United Kingdom) No. 27 Newbridge Motorsport	**(United Kingdom) No. 42 Steller Motorsport**
2	Oulton Park	(United Kingdom) Matt Topham (United Kingdom) Darren Turner	(United Kingdom) Matt Topham (United Kingdom) Darren Turner	**(United Kingdom) Sennan Fielding** **(United Kingdom) Richard Williams**
3	Silverstone	(United Kingdom) No. 42 Steller Motorsport	**(United Kingdom) No. 27 Newbridge Motorsport**	(United Kingdom) No. 51 Valluga Racing
3	Silverstone	(United Kingdom) Sennan Fielding (United Kingdom) Richard Williams	**(United Kingdom) Matt Topham** **(United Kingdom) Darren Turner**	(United Kingdom) Ross Wylie (United Kingdom) Matthew Graham
4	Donington Park	(United Kingdom) No. 42 Steller Motorsport	(United Kingdom) No. 27 Newbridge Motorsport	**(United Kingdom) No. 61 Academy Motorsport**
4	Donington Park	(United Kingdom) Sennan Fielding (United Kingdom) Richard Williams	(United Kingdom) Matt Topham (United Kingdom) Darren Turner	**(Canada) Marco Signoretti** **(United Kingdom) Matt Cowley**
5	Snetterton Circuit	(United Kingdom) No. 61 Academy Motorsport	(United Kingdom) No. 27 Newbridge Motorsport	**(United Kingdom) No. 23 R Racing**
5	Snetterton Circuit	(Canada) Marco Signoretti (United Kingdom) Matt Cowley	(United Kingdom) Matt Topham (United Kingdom) Darren Turner	**(United Kingdom) Jamie Day** **(United Kingdom) Josh Miller**
6	Snetterton Circuit	(United Kingdom) No. 23 R Racing	(United Kingdom) No. 27 Newbridge Motorsport	**(United Kingdom) No. 90 Century Motorsport**
6	Snetterton Circuit	(United Kingdom) Jamie Day (United Kingdom) Josh Miller	(United Kingdom) Matt Topham (United Kingdom) Darren Turner	**(United Kingdom) Jack Brown** **(United Kingdom) Will Burns**
7	Spa-Francorchamps	(United Kingdom) No. 61 Academy Motorsport	(United Kingdom) No. 68 Team BRIT	**(United Kingdom) No. 23 R Racing**
7	Spa-Francorchamps	(Canada) Marco Signoretti (United Kingdom) Matt Cowley	(United Kingdom) Aaron Morgan (United Kingdom) Bobby Trundley	**(United Kingdom) Jamie Day** **(United Kingdom) Josh Miller**
8	Brands Hatch	(United Kingdom) No. 42 Steller Motorsport	**(United Kingdom) No. 27 Newbridge Motorsport**	(United Kingdom) No. 42 Steller Motorsport
8	Brands Hatch	(United Kingdom) Sennan Fielding (United Kingdom) Richard Williams	**(United Kingdom) Matt Topham** **(United Kingdom) Darren Turner**	(United Kingdom) Sennan Fielding (United Kingdom) Richard Williams
9	Donington Park	(Japan) No. 48 Toyota Gazoo Racing UK	(United Kingdom) No. 26 Paddock Motorsport	**(Japan) No. 48 Toyota Gazoo Racing UK**
9	Donington Park	(Republic of Ireland) Tom Edgar (United Kingdom) Jordan Collard	(United Kingdom) Moh Ritson (United Kingdom) Kavi Jundu	**(Republic of Ireland) Tom Edgar** **(United Kingdom) Jordan Collard**

== Championship standings ==
Points were awarded as follows:

Length	1st	2nd	3rd	4th	5th	6th	7th	8th	9th	10th
1 hour	25	18	15	12	10	8	6	4	2	1
2+ hours	37.5	27	22.5	18	15	12	9	6	3	1.5

An additional point is awarded to both GT3 and GT4 driver who sets their class' fastest race lap.

=== Drivers' Championships ===
==== Overall ====
Pos.	Drivers	Team	OUL		SIL	DON	SNE		SPA	BRH	DON	Points
GT3
1	(United Kingdom) Ian Loggie	(United Kingdom) Ram Racing	2	**1**	27	3	**1**	6	3	6	2	162
2	(United Kingdom) Adam Balon (United Kingdom) Sandy Mitchell	(United Kingdom) Barwell Motorsport	9	12	**1**	15	6	2	**4**	2	5	128.5
3	(United Kingdom) Marcus Clutton (United Kingdom) Morgan Tillbrook	(United Kingdom) Enduro Motorsport	8	20	DSQ	**1**	5	5	26	1	3	123.5
4	(United Kingdom) James Cottingham (United Kingdom) Lewis Williamson	(Bahrain) 2 Seas Motorsport	5	Ret	Ret	2	4	7	2	**4**	9	114
5	(France) Jules Gounon	(United Kingdom) Ram Racing	2	**1**					3		2	92.5
6	(United Kingdom) Alex Malykhin (United Kingdom) James Dorlin	(United Kingdom) Redline Racing	14	8	4	5	8	4	5	23		82
7	(United Kingdom) Nick Halstead	(United Kingdom) Fox Motorsport	3	9	13	9	9	8	1	10	11	81
8	(United Kingdom) Jamie Stanley	(United Kingdom) Fox Motorsport	3	9	13		9	8	1	10	11	78
9	(United Kingdom) Callum MacLeod	(United Kingdom) Ram Racing			27	3	**1**	6		6		69.5
10	(United Kingdom) Michael Igoe (United Kingdom) Phil Keen	(United Kingdom) WPI Motorsport	4	7	7	6	2	14	27			68
11	(United Kingdom) Alexander Sims	(United Kingdom) Century Motorsport								3	1	60
12	(Sweden) Mia Flewitt (United Kingdom) Euan Hankey	(United Kingdom) 7TSIX	6	10	29	4	11	12	Ret	5	6	58
13	(United Kingdom) John Ferguson	(United Kingdom) Ram Racing	10	Ret	14	7	7	**1**	6			54.5
14	(Belgium) Ulysse de Pauw	(United Kingdom) Ram Racing				7	7	**1**	6			52
15	(United Kingdom) Shaun Balfe (United Kingdom) Adam Carroll	(United Kingdom) Balfe Motorsport	**1**	2	Ret	8						49
16	(United Kingdom) Darren Leung	(United Kingdom) Century Motorsport									1	37.5
17	(United Kingdom) Martin Plowman	(United Kingdom) Paddock Motorsport	15	3	9	11	15	15	7	21	Ret	36
18	(United Kingdom) James Kell	(United Kingdom) Team Rocket RJN	Ret	6	11	16	10	Ret	9	8	12	35
19	(United Kingdom) Richard Neary (United Kingdom) Sam Neary	(United Kingdom) Team ABBA Racing	13	4	DSQ	13	3	11		9	**Ret**	31
20	(United Kingdom) Mark Sansom (United Kingdom) William Tregurtha	(United Kingdom) Assetto Motorsport	7	25	6	17	13	10				30.5
21	(United Kingdom) Simon Watts	(United Kingdom) Team Rocket RJN			11	16	10	Ret	9	8	12	25
22	(United Kingdom) Henry Dawes	(United Kingdom) Century Motorsport								3		22.5
23	(United Kingdom) Stewart Proctor (United Kingdom) Lewis Proctor	(United Kingdom) Greystone GT	11	Ret	8	12	16	13	8	Ret	Ret	21
24	(United Kingdom) Graham Davidson	(United Kingdom) Paddock Motorsport	Ret	6			15	15	7			19
25	(United Kingdom) Nick Jones (United Kingdom) Scott Malvern	(United Kingdom) Team Parker Racing	28	11		10	12	9	10	7		17
26	(United Kingdom) Kelvin Fletcher	(United Kingdom) Paddock Motorsport	15	3		11				21		15
27	(United Kingdom) Andrew Howard	(United Kingdom) Paddock Motorsport			9							12
28	(Taiwan) Betty Chen	(United Kingdom) Century Motorsport	DNS	14	12	14	14	29				6
-	(United Kingdom) Angus Fender	(United Kingdom) Century Motorsport	DNS	14	12	14						6
29	(United Kingdom) Rob Bell	(United Kingdom) Fox Motorsport				9						3
30	(United Kingdom) Jamie Caroline	(United Kingdom) Ram Racing	10	Ret	14							2.5
31	(United States) Mark Smith	(United Kingdom) Paddock Motorsport									Ret	0
32	(United Kingdom) Warren Hughes	(United Kingdom) Greystone GT										0
33	(Sweden) Joel Eriksson	(United Kingdom) Century Motorsport					14	29	11			0
-	(United Kingdom) David Holloway	(United Kingdom) Century Motorsport							11			0
Drivers ineligible to score points
-	(Macau) Kevin Tse (United Kingdom) Chris Froggatt	(United Kingdom) Sky Tempesta Racing	12	5	10							
-	(United Kingdom) Andrew Howard	(United Kingdom) Sky Tempesta Racing								20		
-	(Sweden) Alexander West (Germany) Marvin Kirchhöfer	(United Kingdom) Garage 59			2							
-	(United Kingdom) Nick Moss (United Kingdom) Joe Osborne	(United Kingdom) Optimum Motorsport			3							
-	(United Kingdom) Flick Haigh (United Kingdom) Jonathan Adam	(Bahrain) 2 Seas Motorsport			5		28	3				
-	(United Kingdom) Iain Campbell (United Kingdom) Oliver Webb	(United Kingdom) Greystone GT							12			
-	(United Kingdom) Simon Orange (United Kingdom) Michael O'Brien	(United Kingdom) Orange Racing powered by JMH									4	
-	(United Kingdom) Andrew Howard (United Kingdom) Lewis Proctor	(United Kingdom) Beachdean AMR									7	
-	(United Kingdom) Graham Davidson (United Kingdom) Aaron Walker	(Bahrain) 2 Seas Motorsport									8	
-	(United Kingdom) Andrey Borodin (United Kingdom) Ed Pead	(United Kingdom) Greystone GT									10	
GT4
1	(United Kingdom) Richard Williams (United Kingdom) Sennan Fielding	(United Kingdom) Steller Motorsport	**16**	13	**17**	**25**	18	26	16	**12**	14	168.5
2	(United Kingdom) Matt Topham (United Kingdom) Darren Turner	(United Kingdom) Newbridge Motorsport	20	**15**	15	24	19	18	18	11	19	163
3	(United Kingdom) Josh Miller (United Kingdom) Jamie Day	(United Kingdom) R Racing	17	18	23	22	17	**23**	13	14	15	156
4	(United Kingdom) Tom Edgar	(Japan) Toyota Gazoo Racing UK	23	17	28	20	20	19	17	16	**13**	127
5	(United Kingdom) Jordan Collard	(Japan) Toyota Gazoo Racing UK			28	20	20	19	17	16	**13**	111
6	(United Kingdom) Will Burns (United Kingdom) Jack Brown	(United Kingdom) Century Motorsport	21	16	19	19	25	16	22	19	20	107
7	(United Kingdom) Matt Cowley (Canada) Marco Signoretti	(United Kingdom) Academy Motorsport	19	23	18	18	**29**	17	**19**	22	25	99.5
8	(United Kingdom) Seb Hopkins (United Kingdom) Jamie Orton	(United Kingdom) Team Parker Racing	22	21	21	21	24	22	14	13	Ret	98.5
9	(United Kingdom) Ross Wylie	(United Kingdom) Valluga Racing	18	19	16	23	23	21				76
10	(United Kingdom) Matthew Graham	(United Kingdom) Valluga Racing			16	23	23	21				53
11	(United Kingdom) Aaron Morgan (United Kingdom) Bobby Trundley	(United Kingdom) Team BRIT	26	22	26	27	22	28	15	15	23	52.5
12	(United Kingdom) Chris Salkeld (United Kingdom) Tom Rawlings	(United Kingdom) Century Motorsport	27	24	20	26	21	24	24		17	43
13	(United Kingdom) Moh Ritson	(United Kingdom) Paddock Motorsport	24	Ret	24	Ret	30	20	21	Ret	16	39
14	(United Kingdom) Benji Hetherington	(United Kingdom) Valluga Racing	18	19					23	Ret	18	36.5
15	(United Kingdom) Ashley Marshall	(United Kingdom) Paddock Motorsport	24	Ret	24	Ret	30	20	21			21
16	(United Kingdom) Kavi Jundu	(United Kingdom) Paddock Motorsport									16	18
17	(United Kingdom) Joe Wheeler (United Kingdom) Freddie Tomlinson	(United Kingdom) Assetto Motorsport	25	Ret	25	Ret	27	25	25	17	21	16.5
18	(United Kingdom) Jack Mitchell	(Japan) Toyota Gazoo Racing UK	23	17								16
19	(United Kingdom) Adam Knight	(United Kingdom) Valluga Racing									18	12
20	(United Kingdom) Lucky Khera	(United Kingdom) Valluga Racing							23			1.5
21	(United Kingdom) Richard Marsh (United Kingdom) Gareth Howell	(Netherlands) Inspire Racing										0
22	(United Kingdom) Adam Hadfield	(United Kingdom) Paddock Motorsport								Ret		0
-	(United Kingdom) Mark Radcliffe	(United Kingdom) Valluga Racing								Ret		0
Drivers ineligible to score points
-	(United Kingdom) David Holloway (United Kingdom) Bradley Ellis	(United Kingdom) Century Motorsport			22							
-	(United Kingdom) Ed McDermott (United Kingdom) Michael Broadhurst	(United Kingdom) Motus One Racing			30	Ret	26	27		Ret	24	
-	(Macau) Kevin Tse (Hong Kong) Antares Au	(Germany) Herberth Motorsport							20			
-	(United Kingdom) Darren Leung (United Kingdom) Charlie Robertson	(United Kingdom) Assetto Motorsport								18		
-	(United States) Erik Evans (United Kingdom) Will Moore	(United Kingdom) Academy Motorsport									22	
Pos.	Drivers	Team	OUL		SIL	DON	SNE		SPA	BRH	DON	Points

Colour	Result
Gold	Winner
Silver	Second place
Bronze	Third place
Green	Points classification
Blue	Non-points classification
Blue	Non-classified finish (NC)
Purple	Retired, not classified (Ret)
Red	Did not qualify (DNQ)
Red	Did not pre-qualify (DNPQ)
Black	Disqualified (DSQ)
White	Did not start (DNS)
White	Withdrew (WD)
White	Race cancelled (C)
Blank	Did not practice (DNP)
Blank	Did not arrive (DNA)
Blank	Excluded (EX)

**Bold** indicates pole position

==== Pro-Am Cup ====
Pos.	Drivers	Team	OUL		SIL	DON	SNE		SPA	BRH	DON	Points
GT3
1	(United Kingdom) Ian Loggie	(United Kingdom) RAM Racing	2	1	27	3	1	6	3	6	2	182
2	(United Kingdom) Adam Balon (United Kingdom) Sandy Mitchell	(United Kingdom) Barwell Motorsport	9	12	1	15	6	2	4	2	5	145
3	(United Kingdom) Morgan Tillbrook (United Kingdom) Marcus Clutton	(United Kingdom) Enduro Motorsport	8	20	DSQ	1	5	5	26	1	3	141.5
4	(United Kingdom) Nick Halstead	(United Kingdom) Fox Motorsport	3	9	13	9	9	8	1	10	11	122.5
5	(United Kingdom) James Cottingham (United Kingdom) Lewis Williamson	(Bahrain) 2 Seas Motorsport	5	Ret	Ret	2	3	7	2	4	9	121
6	(United Kingdom) Jamie Stanley	(United Kingdom) Fox Motorsport	3	9	13		9	8	1	10	11	113.5
7	(France) Jules Gounon	(United Kingdom) RAM Racing	2	1					3		2	92.5
8	(United Kingdom) Michael Igoe (United Kingdom) Phil Keen	(United Kingdom) WPI Motorsport	4	7	7	6	2	14	27			91
9	(United Kingdom) Callum MacLeod	(United Kingdom) RAM Racing			27	3	1	6		6		89.5
10	(Sweden) Mia Flewitt (United Kingdom) Euan Hankey	(United Kingdom) 7TSIX	6	10	29	4	11	12	Ret	5	6	88
11	(United Kingdom) Martin Plowman	(United Kingdom) Paddock Motorsport	15	3	9	11	15	15	7	21	Ret	63.5
12	(United Kingdom) Alexander Sims	(United Kingdom) Century Motorsport								3	1	60
13	(United Kingdom) Shaun Balfe (United Kingdom) Adam Carroll	(United Kingdom) Balfe Motorsport	1	2	Ret	8						55
14	(United Kingdom) Nick Jones (United Kingdom) Scott Malvern	(United Kingdom) Team Parker Racing	28	11		10	12	9	10	7		46
15	(United Kingdom) Darren Leung	(United Kingdom) Century Motorsport									1	37.5
16	(United Kingdom) Kelvin Fletcher	(United Kingdom) Paddock Motorsport	15	3		11				21		23
17	(United Kingdom) Henry Dawes	(United Kingdom) Century Motorsport								3		22.5
-	(United Kingdom) Andrew Howard	(United Kingdom) Paddock Motorsport			9							22.5
18	(United Kingdom) Graham Davidson	(United Kingdom) Paddock Motorsport					15	15	7			18
19	(Sweden) Joel Eriksson	(United Kingdom) Century Motorsport					14	29	11			12
20	(United Kingdom) David Holloway	(United Kingdom) Century Motorsport							11			9
21	(United Kingdom) Rob Bell	(United Kingdom) Fox Motorsport				9						9
22	(Taiwan) Betty Chen	(United Kingdom) Century Motorsport					14	29				3
23	(United States) Mark Smith	(United Kingdom) Paddock Motorsport									Ret	0
GT4
1	(United Kingdom) Matt Topham (United Kingdom) Darren Turner	(United Kingdom) Newbridge Motorsport	20	15	15	24	19	18	18	11	19	174.5
2	(United Kingdom) Aaron Morgan (United Kingdom) Bobby Trundley	(United Kingdom) Team BRIT	26	22	26	27	22	28	15	15	23	145.5
3	(United Kingdom) Benji Hetherington	(United Kingdom) Valluga Racing							23	Ret	18	49.5
4	(United Kingdom) Moh Ritson (United Kingdom) Kavi Jundu	(United Kingdom) Paddock Motorsport									16	37.5
5	(United Kingdom) Adam Knight	(United Kingdom) Valluga Racing									18	27
6	(United Kingdom) Lucky Khera	(United Kingdom) Valluga Racing							23			22.5
7	(United Kingdom) Mark Radcliffe	(United Kingdom) Valluga Racing								Ret		0
8	(United Kingdom) Richard Marsh (United Kingdom) Gareth Howell	(Netherlands) Inspire Racing										0
Pos.	Drivers	Team	OUL		SIL	DON	SNE		SPA	BRH	DON	Points

==== Silver Cups ====
Pos.	Drivers	Team	OUL		SIL	DON	SNE		SPA	BRH	DON	Points
GT3 - (Silver/Am Cup)
1	(United Kingdom) Alex Malykhin (United Kingdom) James Dorlin	(United Kingdom) Redline Racing	14	8	4	5	8	4	5	23		193
2	(United Kingdom) James Kell	(United Kingdom) Team Rocket RJN	Ret	6	11	16	10	Ret	9	8	12	153
3	(United Kingdom) Simon Watts	(United Kingdom) Team Rocket RJN			11	16	10	Ret	9	8	12	135
4	(United Kingdom) John Ferguson	(United Kingdom) Ram Racing	10	Ret	14	7	7	1	6			127
5	(United Kingdom) Richard Neary (United Kingdom) Sam Neary	(United Kingdom) Team ABBA Racing	13	4	DSQ	13	3	11		9	Ret	119
6	(United Kingdom) Stewart Proctor (United Kingdom) Lewis Proctor	(United Kingdom) Greystone GT	11	Ret	8	12	16	13	8	Ret	Ret	100.5
7	(Belgium) Ulysse de Pauw	(United Kingdom) Ram Racing				7	7	1	6			97
8	(United Kingdom) Mark Sansom (United Kingdom) William Tregurtha	(United Kingdom) Assetto Motorsport	7	25	6	17	13	10	DNS			96
9	(Taiwan) Betty Chen (United Kingdom) Angus Fender	(United Kingdom) Century Motorsport		14	12	14						42
10	(United Kingdom) Jamie Caroline	(United Kingdom) Ram Racing	10	Ret	14							30
11	(United Kingdom) Graham Davidson	(United Kingdom) Team Rocket RJN	Ret	6								18
12	(United Kingdom) Warren Hughes	(United Kingdom) Greystone GT										0
GT4 - (Silver Cup)
1	(United Kingdom) Richard Williams (United Kingdom) Sennan Fielding	(United Kingdom) Steller Motorsport	16	13	17	25	18	26	16	12	14	192
2	(United Kingdom) Josh Miller (United Kingdom) Jamie Day	(United Kingdom) R Racing	17	18	23	22	17	23	13	14	15	167.5
3	(United Kingdom) Tom Edgar	(Japan) Toyota Gazoo Racing UK	23	17	28	20	20	19	17	16	13	148.5
4	(United Kingdom) Will Burns (United Kingdom) Jack Brown	(United Kingdom) Century Motorsport	21	16	19	19	25	16	22	19	20	140
5	(United Kingdom) Matt Cowley (Canada) Marco Signoretti	(United Kingdom) Academy Motorsport	19	23	18	18	29	17	19	22	25	131
6	(United Kingdom) Jordan Collard	(Japan) Toyota Gazoo Racing UK			28	20	20	19	17	16	13	127.5
7	(United Kingdom) Seb Hopkins (United Kingdom) Jamie Orton	(United Kingdom) Team Parker Racing	22	21	21	21	24	22	14	13	Ret	116
8	(United Kingdom) Ross Wylie	(United Kingdom) Valluga Racing	18	19	16	23	23	21				94.5
9	(United Kingdom) Matthew Graham	(United Kingdom) Valluga Racing			16	23	23	21				69.5
10	(United Kingdom) Chris Salkeld (United Kingdom) Tom Rawlings	(United Kingdom) Century Motorsport	27	24	20	26	21	24	24		17	66
11	(United Kingdom) Joe Wheeler (United Kingdom) Freddie Tomlinson	(United Kingdom) Assetto Motorsport	25	Ret	25	Ret	27	25	25	17	21	41
12	(United Kingdom) Moh Ritson	(United Kingdom) Paddock Motorsport	24	Ret	24	Ret	30	20	21	Ret		35
12	(United Kingdom) Ashley Marshall	(United Kingdom) Paddock Motorsport	24	Ret	24	Ret	30	20	21			35
13	(United Kingdom) Benji Hetherington	(United Kingdom) Valluga Racing	18	19								25
14	(United Kingdom) Jack Mitchell	(Japan) Toyota Gazoo Racing UK	23	17								21
15	(United Kingdom) Adam Hadfield	(United Kingdom) Paddock Motorsport								Ret		0
Pos.	Drivers	Team	OUL		SIL	DON	SNE		SPA	BRH	DON	Points

=== Teams' Championship ===
Pos.	Team	Manufacturer	No.	OUL		SIL	DON	SNE		SPA	BRH	DON	Points
GT3
1	(United Kingdom) Ram Racing	Mercedes-AMG	6	2	1	27	3	1	6	3	6	2	216.5
1	(United Kingdom) Ram Racing	Mercedes-AMG	15	10	Ret	14	7	7	1	6			216.5
2	(United Kingdom) Barwell Motorsport	Lamborghini	72	9	12	1	15	6	2	4	2	5	128.5
3	(United Kingdom) Enduro Motorsport	McLaren	77	8	20	DSQ	1	5	5	26	1	3	123.5
4	(Bahrain) 2 Seas Motorsport	Mercedes-AMG	4	5	Ret	Ret	2	4	7	2	4	9	114
5	(United Kingdom) Redline Racing	Lamborghini	32	14	8	4	5	8	4	5	23		82
6	(United Kingdom) Fox Motorsport	McLaren	40	3	9	13	9	9	8	1	10	11	81
7	(United Kingdom) WPI Motorsport	Lamborghini	18	4	7	7	6	2	14	27			68
8	(United Kingdom) Century Motorsport	BMW	91	DNS	14	12	14	14	29	11	3	1	66
9	(United Kingdom) 7TSIX	McLaren	76	6	10	29	4	11	12	Ret	5	6	58
10	(United Kingdom) Balfe Motorsport	Audi	22	1	2	Ret	8						49
11	(United Kingdom) Paddock Motorsport	McLaren	11	15	3	9	11	15	15	7	21	Ret	36
12	(United Kingdom) Team Rocket RJN	McLaren	2	Ret	6	11	16	10	Ret	9	8	12	35
13	(United Kingdom) Team ABBA Racing	Mercedes-AMG	8	13	4	DSQ	13	3	11		9	Ret	31
14	(United Kingdom) Assetto Motorsport	Bentley	3	7	25	6	17	13	10				30.5
15	(United Kingdom) Greystone GT	McLaren	5	11	Ret	8	12	16	13	8	Ret	Ret	21
16	(United Kingdom) Team Parker Racing	Porsche	66	28	11		10	12	9	10	7		17
GT4
1	(United Kingdom) Steller Motorsport	Audi	42	16	13	17	25	18	26	16	12	14	168.5
2	(United Kingdom) Newbridge Motorsport	Aston Martin	27	20	15	15	24	19	18	18	11	19	163
3	(United Kingdom) R Racing	Aston Martin	23	17	18	23	22	17	23	13	14	15	156
4	(United Kingdom) Century Motorsport	BMW	9	27	24	20	26	21	24	24		17	150
4	(United Kingdom) Century Motorsport	BMW	90	21	16	19	19	25	16	22	19	20	150
5	(Japan) Toyota Gazoo Racing UK	Toyota	48	23	17	28	20	20	19	17	16	13	127
6	(United Kingdom) Academy Motorsport	Ford	61	19	23	18	18	29	17	19	22	25	99.5
7	(United Kingdom) Team Parker Racing	Porsche	65	22	21	21	21	24	22	14	13	Ret	98.5
8	(United Kingdom) Valluga Racing	Porsche	51	18	19	16	23	23	21	23	Ret	18	89.5
9	(United Kingdom) Team BRIT	McLaren	68	26	22	26	27	22	28	15	15	23	52.5
10	(United Kingdom) Paddock Motorsport	McLaren	26	24	Ret	24	Ret	30	20	21	Ret	16	39
11	(United Kingdom) Assetto Motorsport	Ginetta	56	25	Ret	25	Ret	27	25	25	17	21	16.5
12	(Netherlands) Inspire Racing	BMW	14										0
Pos.	Team	Manufacturer	No.	OUL		SIL	DON	SNE		SPA	BRH	DON	Points

== See also ==
- 2022 GT World Challenge Europe
- 2022 GT World Challenge Europe Sprint Cup
- 2022 GT World Challenge Europe Endurance Cup
- 2022 GT World Challenge Asia
- 2022 GT World Challenge America
- 2022 GT World Challenge Australia
- 2022 Intercontinental GT Challenge
