= Daren Mk.3 =

Prototype sports car

- Designer: John Green
- Production: 6 (1971–1973)
- Predecessor: Daren Mk.2 (Daren); Jerboa SP (John Green)
- Successor: Daren Mk.4 (Direct); Daren Mk.6 (Spiritual)

Technical specifications
- Chassis: BRM P578
- Length: 4,500 mm (177.2 in)
- Width: 2,150 mm (84.6 in)
- Height: 790 mm (31.1 in)
- Wheelbase: 2,098 mm (82.6 in)
- Engine: BRM V8 2,136 cc (130.3 cu in); 71.08 mm × 50.8 mm (2.798 in × 2.000 in) longitudinal
- Transmission: Hewland FT200 5-speed Manual
- Power: 291 bhp (295 PS; 217 kW) at 12,000 rpm 280 N⋅m (210 lbf⋅ft) at 9,500 rpm
- Weight: 1,180 lb (540 kg)

Competition history
- Notable drivers: Hugh Dibley; Alan Rollinson
Entries	Races	Wins	Podiums
35	31	0	2
Poles	F/Laps	Titles	
0	1	0	

The Daren Mk.3 and Mk.4 are the third and fourth sports prototype racing cars built by Daren Cars (now Hydrautug).

== History ==
Daren Cars was founded in 1967, and first produced a car in the Mk.1 in 1968. John Green built the car for racing based on a Merlyn MK11 Formula Ford. The car would be so successful, winning 4 races, that John Green started getting requests to build more Mk.1s, and as such the Mk.2 was born, with only one Mk.1 ever being made. The cars were made with "Martin" branded Cosworth FVD engines, with 8 being made in 1968-1970. In 1970, Daren started development for the Mk.3 as based on the Mk.2, but now fitted with a BRM V8. Six Mk.3s would be built, with an original selling price of £2,500 as a rolling chassis (no engine or gearbox). The BRM V8 used in the car is bored out from stock 2.58 mm (0.102 in), upping the total displacement to 2,136 cc (130.3 cu in) for a total bore and stroke of 71.08 mm × 50.8 mm (2.798 in × 2.000 in).

Drivers included Hugh Dibley, Alan Rollinson, Martin Davidson, Martin Raymond, Jack Wheeler, Arthur Collier, Charles Graemiger, Jeremy Lord, Keith Norman, John Green, Clive Baker, Peter Hanson, Roger Enever, Ian Bracey, Jean-Pierre Adatte.

== Daren Mk.4 ==
Daren Mk.4
- Designer: John Green
- Production: 1
- Predecessor: Daren Mk.3
- Successor: Daren Mk.5

Technical specifications
- Chassis: Daren Mk.3, which is derived from the BRM P578
- Length: 3,380 mm (133.1 in)
- Width: 2,000 mm (78.7 in)
- Height: 850 mm (33.5 in)
- Wheelbase: 2,098 mm (82.6 in)
- Engine: Cosworth FVC 1,790 cc (1.8 L) Inline 4, Longitudinally mounted NA MR Layout
- Transmission: Hewland FT200 5-speed Manual transmission
- Power: 258 PS (254 hp; 190 kW) @ 8,750 rpm 214 N⋅m (158 lb⋅ft) @ 6,500 rpm
- Weight: 510 kg (1,124 lb)
- Tyres: Michelin

Competition history
- Notable entrants: Daren
- Notable drivers: Martin Raymond
- Debut: 1974 Vila Real Grand Prix
Entries	Races	Wins	Podiums
1	1	0	0
Poles	F/Laps		
0	0		

In 1973, with a lack of orders, and Daren would shut down. The Daren Mk.4 was an unofficial designation of an evolution model of the Daren Mk.3, built by Martin Raymond. The car would debut at the 1974 Vila Real endurance race but would suffer a crash and would not be rebuilt. The car would be fit with a Cosworth FVC. The car would be fitted with a similar body to that of the Mk.3, but it would be smaller by 1.12 m (44.1 in). However this smaller body was made of Aluminium instead of Fiberglass, which meant it would only be 25 kg (55 lb) lighter instead of the projected 60 kg (132 lb) that Martin Raymond was promising.
