= G15 (disambiguation) =

The G-15 or Group of 15 is an informal forum composed of developing countries, set up to foster cooperation and provide input for other international groups.

G15 or G-15 may also refer to:

== Politics ==
- G-15 (Eritrea), a group of politicians in Eritrea
- Group of Democratic Centralism, once called Group of 15, a Russian opposition group

== Computing ==
- Bendix G-15, a computer
- Logitech G15, a computer keyboard
- Samsung Sens G15, a laptop computer

== Transportation ==
- County Route G15 (California), a road
- G15 Shenyang–Haikou Expressway, an expressway in China connecting the cities of Shenyang and Haikou
- GER Class G15, a class of British steam locomotive
- Ginetta G15, a car
- Matchless G15, a motorcycle model
- Prince G-15 engine, used in the Nissan Skyline car model

== Other uses ==
- Canon PowerShot G15, a digital camera
- G15 (housing associations), a group of large social landlords in London, UK
