= Ginetta G26 =

The Ginetta G26 and its derivatives, the G28, G30, and G31, are a series of two-door sports cars, designed, developed, and manufactured by British company Ginetta, from 1984 to 1992, primarily in kit form. All models are based on Ford mechanical components. They differ in length as well as in different bodies and engines. All variants together, about 360 vehicles were built in eight years.

== History ==
Founded by Bob, Douglas, Ivor, and Trevor Walklett, the Ginetta company produced small roadworthy sports cars in 1958 with plastic bodies and high volume Ford of Britain or Rootes engineering. Most of them were offered as kits; individual models - mostly cars for use in motorsports - were also or exclusively available as finished vehicles. The most successful models were the front-engined G4 and rear-engined G15, with Ginetta selling more than 500 kits each. In the 1970s, the G21 hatchback coupe was Ginetta's main model. When the G21 with its rounded body from the 1970s found few buyers and a revised version known as the G24 did not get past the prototype stage, the decision was made to develop a larger, modern coupé with a wedge-shaped structure, for which Ginetta stylistically based on the Lotus Excel and the wedges from TVR.

The car appeared under the name Ginetta G26 in the spring of 1984. The G26 became the base model of a family of four versions (G28, G30, and G31), which were produced until 1992. It survived the acquisition of operations by investors Martin Phaff and Mike Madin. The cars were mainly sold as kits, but the factory also completed individual cars.

Ginetta took over the design of the front section up to the doors unchanged for the mid-engine coupe G32 introduced in 1989.

== Model description ==
The G26 and all its derivatives have a frame constructed of square section electroplated steel tubing designed by Ivor Walklett. Frame dimensions vary between models.

The frames are each designed to accommodate chassis and drivetrain components of the Ford Cortina Mark 3 or 4; the vehicles have rack and pinion steering, double wishbones and disc brakes at the front, and a rigid axle with four links and drum brakes at the rear. Only one donor vehicle (single donor car) is required. For the engine, various four- and six-cylinder engines from the British or German Ford branches were possible; in most cases, 2.0-liter inline four-cylinders were installed.

The bodies are made of glass fiber reinforced plastic. The design is by Trevor Walklett. They are designed as two-door hatchback coupés or indicated notchbacks. The doors and windscreen are unchanged from the Ford Fiesta Mark 1; in hatchback coupés, this also applies to the rear window.

== Ginetta G26 ==
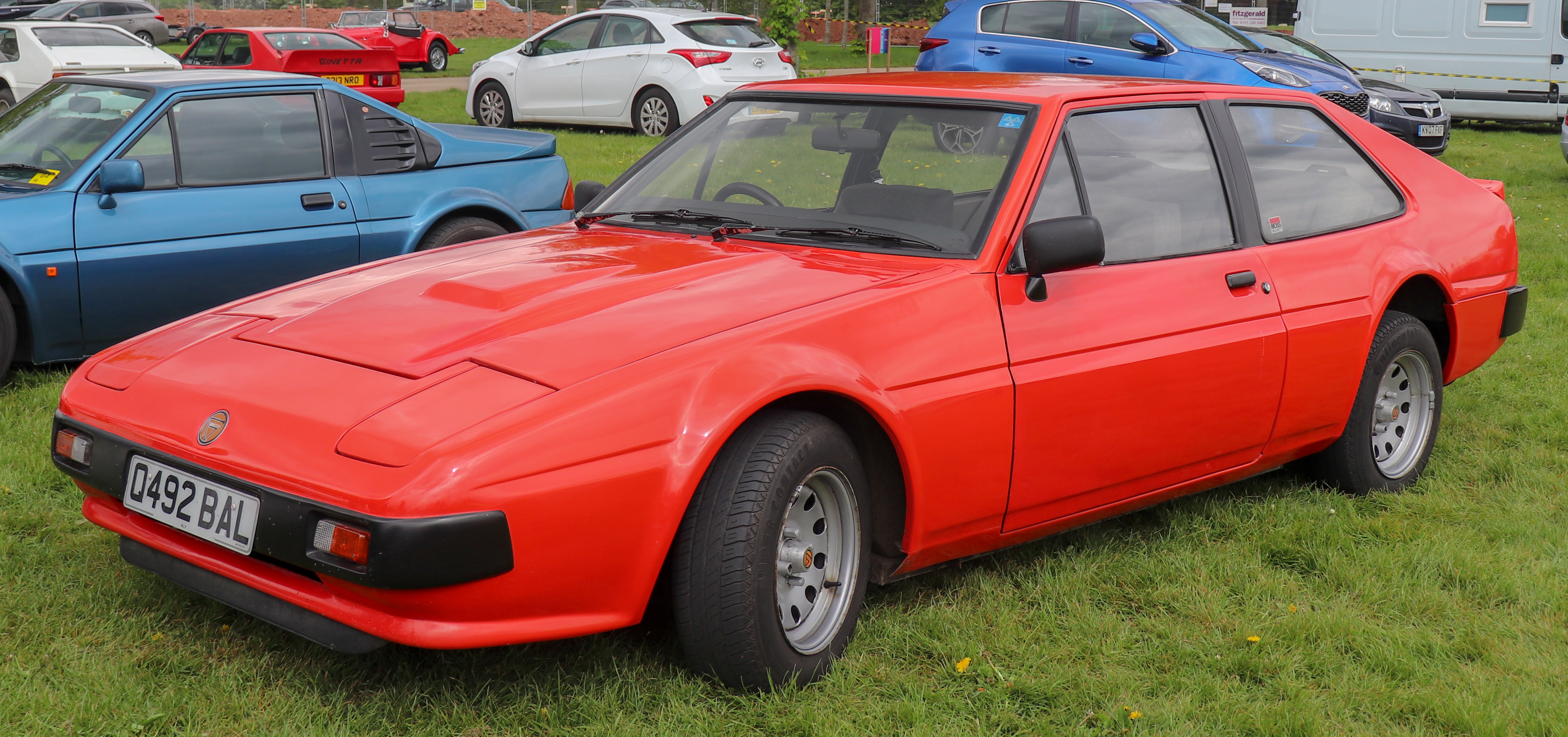
Ginetta G26 front

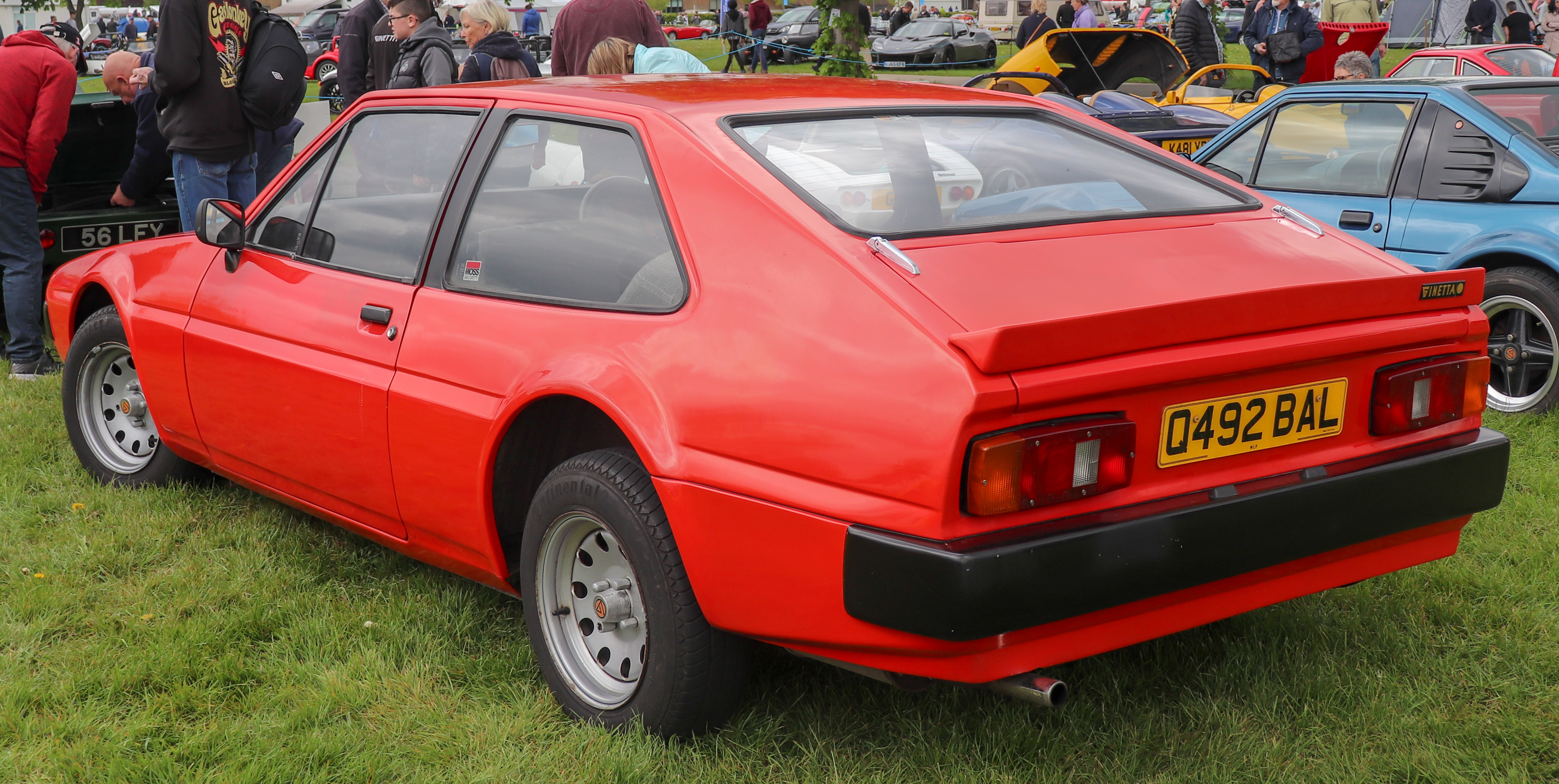
Ginetta G26 rear

The G26 is the base model. It was introduced in the spring of 1984. The G26 is designed as a two-door, five-seat hatchback coupe with a small trunk lid. The front section is wedge-shaped, with pop-up headlights installed at the front. All four-cylinder engines of the Pinto series available in the Ford Cortina were considered as possible engines; Most buyers chose the 2.0-liter version, which delivered 77 kW (105 hp). Six-cylinder engines, on the other hand, did not fit in the G26 because of the flat bonnet. With the 2.0 liter Pinto engine, the car could reach a top speed of 192 km/h (119 mph). The price for a kit was £2,959. The G26 was the most successful variant of the model family. In total, Ginetta sold 284 kits of the G26.

== Ginetta G28 ==
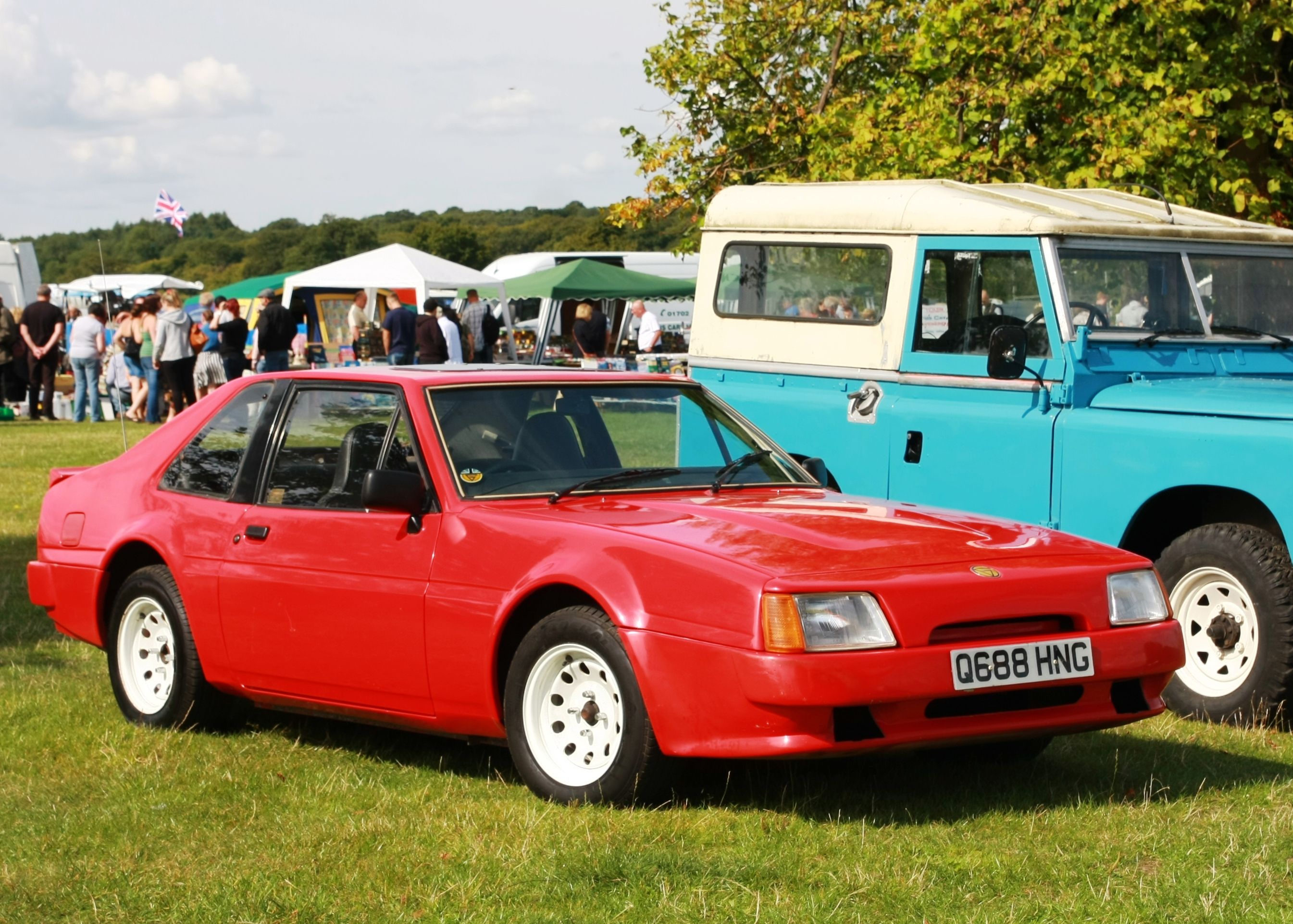
Ginetta G28

The G28 presented in 1986 has a chassis that is 191 mm shorter than the G26 and a correspondingly shorter wheelbase. It is not a five-seater, but a pure two-seater or a 2+2-seater, depending on the customer's requirements. Significant body sections have been redesigned. Although Ginetta reused the doors and windshield of the Ford Fiesta, the rear side windows are shorter than the G26. At the back, the G28 has a hinted notchback instead of the hatchback. The bow is less wedge-shaped than that of the G26. Instead of the pop-up headlights, there is a broadband headlight on each side with an almost vertical lens and indicators protruding into the fenders; the lights are from the Vauxhall Astra Mk. 2 (Opel Kadett E). The higher line of the front of the car allows the installation of larger, taller engines, in particular the six-cylinder V-engines of the Ford Cologne series (2.8 liters displacement) or the Essex series (3.0 liters). At launch the G28 cost £3,055 uncompleted. The G28 is the least common member of the model family. Ginetta only sold six of his kits until 1992.

== Ginetta G30 ==
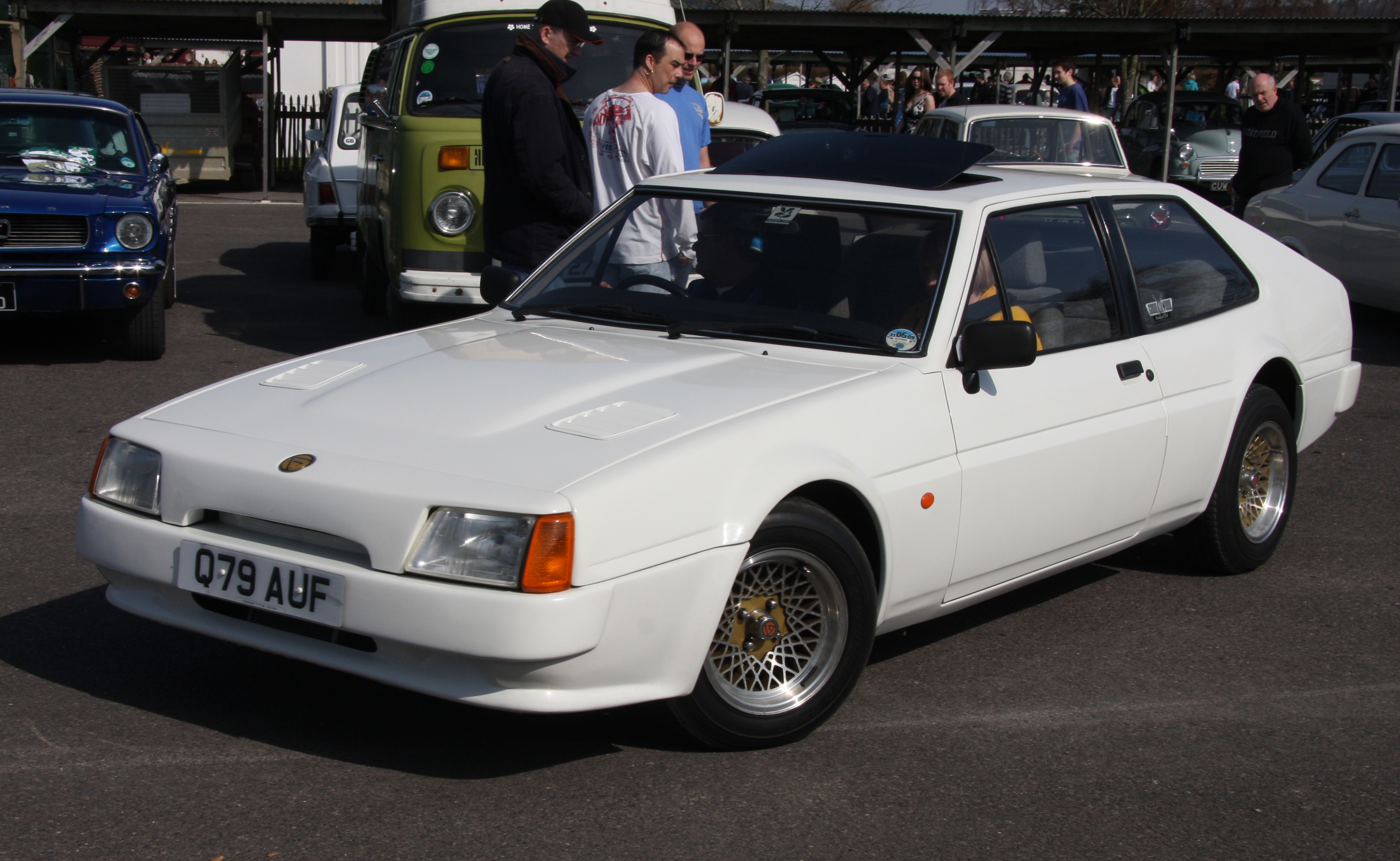
Ginetta G30

For the G30, presented in 1986, Ginetta combined the long chassis and hatchback body of the G26 with the higher bonnet of the (short) Ginetta G28. Like the G26, the G30 is a five-seater but has the Vauxhall Astra's broadband headlights instead of the pop-up headlights. As with the G28, the installation of six-cylinder Ford engines is possible. Most vehicles were fitted with the 2.8 liter Cologne engine. The kit was priced at £2,988, just slightly more than the G26. This version was also rarely sold. Depending on the source, Ginetta sold 10 or 14 kits.

== Ginetta G31 ==
With the G31, also launched in 1986, Ginetta combined the short chassis and notchback body of the G28 with the wedge-shaped front section of the G26. Like the G28, the G31 is a two or 2+2-seater. As with the G26, the flat front section excludes the installation of six-cylinder engines; therefore it usually has four-cylinder engines of the Ford Pinto series. The kit was priced at £3,018 at launch. By 1992, Ginetta had sold 66 or 67 kits, depending on the source.
