= Jerboa SP =

1970 racing car prototype by Jerboa

- Category: Sports prototype
- Constructor: Jerboa
- Designer: John Green
- Production: 1, Produced 1967–1969, Destroyed
- Predecessor: Ginetta G12 (Jerboa); Daren Mk.1 (John Green)
- Successor: Daren Mk.3

Technical specifications
- Length: 3,140 millimetres (124 in)
- Width: 1,524 millimetres (60.0 in)
- Height: 610 millimetres (24 in) (Without Roll cage); 800 millimetres (31 in) (With Roll cage)
- Wheelbase: 2,000 millimetres (79 in)
- Engine: Longitudinally Mounted, Mid Engine, RWD
- Transmission: Various Hewland 4 and 5-speed Manual transmissions

Competition history
- Notable entrants: Jack Wheeler
- Notable drivers: Jack Wheeler; Martin Davidson
- Debut: 1970 Targa Florio
Entries	Races	Wins
8	6	1 (Prototype 1300 class)
- Teams' Championships: 0
- Constructors' Championships: 0
- Drivers' Championships: 0

The Jerboa SP was a sports prototype racing car built by Jerboa in 1970. The car started out life as a Ginetta G12, and was entered by Jack Wheeler in various events in 1970 and 1971, using 1-litre, 1.3-litre, and 1.6-litre BMC straight-four engines.

== Development history ==
The Jerboa's styling would be originally conceived as a show car and evolution model for the Daren Mk.1, by John Green, but would never actually be built as such. The original idea would morph into its formats the Jerboa when Jack Wheeler approached John Green in 1967, asking to purchase a Daren Mk.1, but when he would be told that there would be no more built of this specific car, he would then contract John Green a new car, based on a Ginetta G12 chassis. This car would undergo development alongside the eventual Mk.2, but would use little else but the suspension set up with the Mk.2. Though development would finish in 1969, the car would not be officially entered into a race until 1970.

== Racing history ==
The Jerboa SP made its racing debut at the Targa Florio in 1970, with Wheeler selecting Martin Davidson as his co-driver. The car was fitted with a 1.3-litre BMC A-series straight-four engine. The team did not complete the first lap due to an accident. Wheeler and Davidson then entered the car, newly fitted with a 1.6-litre BMC B-series engine, in the 1000 km of Nürburgring, but did not actually attend the race. A 1-litre A-Series was fitted for the Mugello Grand Prix, and Davidson drove the car to second place in the Prototype 1000 class. The 1.3-litre engine was refitted for the 500 km of Nürburgring, and Wheeler took the Prototype 1300 class victory, finishing 21st overall. Wheeler then finished 17th overall at the 500 km of Spa, which would prove to be the car's best overall finish. He also entered the car at the Nürburgring - Sports, Prototypes and Can-Am race in October, but did not compete in the race. The car's next appearance came at the 1971 Targa Florio, where it was classified 40th overall, and second in the Prototype 1300 category, but retired after seven laps due to clutch failure. Two weeks later, Davidson and Wheeler entered the 1000 km of Nürburgring, with the car featuring a 1.6-litre engine again. Although it was classified 28th overall, and third in the Prototype 1600 category, the team again retired, this time after 29 laps. This proved to be the car's last race, as it was never used again.

== Engines ==
Name	Displacement	Bore × Stroke	Engine	Horsepower	Horsepower RPM	Torque	Torque RPM	Weight
SP 1000	1.0 L (998 cc; 60.9 cu in)	64.58 mm × 76.2 mm (2.543 in × 3.000 in)	BMC A-series I4	99 bhp (100 PS; 74 kW)	5,500	109 N⋅m (80 lb⋅ft)	3,200	400 kg (880 lb)
SP 1300	1.3 L (1,275 cc; 77.8 cu in)	70.6 mm × 81.28 mm (2.780 in × 3.200 in)	BMC A-series I4	113 bhp (115 PS; 84 kW)	6,000	125 N⋅m (92 lb⋅ft)	4,200	434 kg (957 lb)
SP 1600	1.6 L (1,622 cc; 99.0 cu in)	76.2 mm × 75.4 mm (3.00 in × 2.97 in)	BMC B-series I4	146 bhp (148 PS; 109 kW)	4,300	166 N⋅m (122 lb⋅ft)	1,800	475 kg (1,047 lb)
