= Daren Mk.5 =

- Category: Group 6
- Designer: John Green
- Production: 1
- Predecessor: Daren Mk.4
- Successor: Daren Mk.6

Technical specifications
- Chassis: Osella PA5
- Length: 4,110 millimetres (162 in)
- Width: 1,880 millimetres (74 in)
- Height: 900 millimetres (35 in)
- Wheelbase: 2,640 millimetres (104 in)
- Engine: Chevrolet LB9 from a Chevrolet Camaro 4,990 cubic centimetres (305 cu in; 4.99 L) V8, Mounted Longitudinally NA Mid Engine, RWD
- Transmission: Hewland FG400 5-speed Manual
- Power: 300 metric horsepower (300 hp; 220 kW) @ 6,000 rpm 477 newton-metres (352 lb⋅ft) @ 3,850 rpm
- Weight: 625 kilograms (1,378 lb)

Competition history
- Debut: 1980 Varano Grand Prix
Entries	Races	Wins	Podiums	Poles
1	1	0	0	0

The Daren Mk.5 is the fifth sports prototype racing car built by Daren Cars (now Hydrautug).

== History ==
John Green would attempt to restart the company in 1980, modifying an Osella PA5 for racing with a 305 cu in (5.0 L) Chevrolet LB9 small-block from a California market Chevrolet Camaro. The car would be built for Group 6, and because the engine was from a production model, it would be allowed to be up to 5,000 cc (5.0 L), which meant the LB9 would be sleeved from its standard bore and stroke of 94.9 by 88.4 millimetres (3.74 in × 3.48 in), to 95 by 88 millimetres (3.7 in × 3.5 in), for a total displacement of 4,990.12 cubic centimetres (304.516 cu in). The car would place 26th at its first race in the 1980 Italian Championship Group 6 Varano race, and given its poor results, the project would not be continued for the next race. The reason for its failure was almost purely the fact that it was overweight and underpowered. The Osella PA8-BMW that would go on to win the event, would weigh at least 85 kg (187 lb) less than the Mk.5, whilst having at least 180 hp (134 kW; 182 PS) more than the Mk.5.
