= Daren Mk.2 =

- Category: Group 6 (1969-1971); Group 5 (1972)
- Designer(s): John Green
- Production: at least 15
- Predecessor: Daren Mk.1 (Daren); Jerboa SP (Direct)
- Successor: Daren Mk.3

Technical specifications
- Chassis: Alexis Mk19
- Suspension: Double wishbone suspension
- Length: 4,500 mm (177.2 in)
- Width: 1,988 mm (78.3 in)
- Height: 949 mm (37.4 in) (with rollbar); 785 mm (30.9 in) (without rollbar)
- Axle track: 1,500 mm (59.1 in) (Front); 1,650 mm (65.0 in) (Rear)
- Wheelbase: 3,200 mm (126.0 in)
- Engine: See Table (RMR Layout Longitudinal engine)
- Transmission: Hewland FT200 5-speed Manual transmission
- Weight: 633–761 kg (1,395.5–1,677.7 lb)
- Tyres: Michelin

Competition history
- Notable drivers: Jeremy Richardson; Martin Raymond; Peter Richardson; Maynard Soares; Arthur Collier; John Green; Peter Brown; Alistair Cowin
- Debut: 1969 Mallory Park
Entries	Races	Wins	Podiums	Poles
35	34	2 (3 class wins)	5	1

The Daren Mk.2 is the second sports prototype racing car built by Daren Cars (now HydrauTug).

== History ==
The Daren Mk.2 would come after the Mk.1, as a more production-oriented model. The car would find some mild amount of success, winning 4 races. The car would share most of its underpinnings with the Alexis Mk19 F100 car. The car would have 2 variants, the main Mk.2, and the Jerboa SP. The Jerboa however would be originally conceived as an evolution model of the Mk.1 instead of the production version the Mk.2 was intended as. The Jerboa would be built earlier than the Mk.2, but the Mk.2 would debut in 1969, whereas the Jerboa would debut in 1970.

== List of Engines Used ==
Engine Name	Engine Type	Displacement	Horsepower	HP RPM	Torque	Torque RPM
Lotus-Ford Twin Cam	Inline 4	1,558 cc (1.6 L)	126 bhp (128 PS; 94 kW)	6,500	153 N⋅m (113 lb⋅ft)	5,500
N/A Cosworth FVA	Inline 4	1,598 cc (1.6 L)	218 bhp (221 PS; 163 kW)	9,000	190 N⋅m (140 lb⋅ft)	5,500
Supercharged Cosworth FVA	Inline 4	1,598 cc (1.6 L)	280 bhp (284 PS; 209 kW)	8,000	299 N⋅m (221 lb⋅ft)	5,000
Cosworth FVC	Inline 4	1,790 cc (1.8 L)	235 bhp (238 PS; 175 kW)	8,000	224 N⋅m (165 lb⋅ft)	5,000
Cosworth/Lucas BDG	Inline 4	1,790 cc (1.8 L)	276 bhp (280 PS; 206 kW)	8,100	255 N⋅m (188 lb⋅ft)	7,200
Martin branded Cosworth FVD	V8	1,790 cc (1.8 L)	275 bhp (279 PS; 205 kW)	9,000	300 N⋅m (221 lb⋅ft)	3,900
Climax FWMV Mk.III	V8	1,495 cc (1.5 L)	260 bhp (264 PS; 194 kW)	9,500	161 N⋅m (119 lb⋅ft)	7,000
BRM M360	Inline 4	1,999 cc (2.0 L)	300 bhp (304 PS; 224 kW)	10,500	275 N⋅m (203 lb⋅ft)	7,000
Cosworth BDA	Inline 4	1,600 cc (1.6 L)	239 bhp (242 PS; 178 kW)	9,400	198 N⋅m (146 lb⋅ft)	7,600
Cosworth DFV (Development car for the Mk.3)	V8	2,993 cc (3.0 L)	~400 bhp (406 PS; 298 kW)	9,000	~300 N⋅m (221 lb⋅ft)	7,000
BRM V8 (Development car for the Mk.3)	V8	1,498 cc (1.5 L)	~190 bhp (193 PS; 142 kW)	11,000	~160 N⋅m (118 lb⋅ft)	9,500
