= Daren Mk.6 =

- Category: LMP675
- Designer(s): John Green
- Production: 1
- Predecessor: Daren Mk.5
- Successor: None

Technical specifications
- Chassis: Stealth B6
- Length: 3,650 millimetres (144 in)
- Width: 2,100 millimetres (83 in)
- Height: 680 millimetres (27 in)
- Wheelbase: 2,740 millimetres (108 in)
- Engine: Mazda 2 rotor 1,308 cubic centimetres (1.3 L) Mounted Longitudinally NA MR Layout
- Transmission: Hewland 5-speed Manual transmission
- Power: 280 horsepower (284 PS; 209 kW) @ 9,500 rpm 245 newton-metres (181 lb⋅ft) @ 5,700 rpm
- Weight: 675 kilograms (1,488 lb)

Competition history
- Debut: 1999 Castle Combe Grand Prix
Entries	Races	Wins	Podiums	Poles
1	1	0	0	0

The Daren Mk.6 is the sixth and final sports prototype racing cars built by Daren Cars (now Hydrautug).

== History ==
The Mk.6 would be the last car designed by John Green. The car would be sitting on a heavily modified Stealth B6 chassis, but the modifications would be so extreme it would share almost no parts with the B6. The car would be produced for the 1999 season of the British GT Championship, and would be homologated for the LMP675 class. The car would not be a qualified finisher for its only race, at Castle Combe, as it would finish 27 seconds after the winner. This poor result left the car shelved for the "foreseeable future" which turned into it being cancelled.
