= Ginetta G1 =

Overview
- Type: Homebuild
- Manufacturer: Ginetta
- Assembly: Woodbridge Suffolk
- Designer: Ivor Walklett

Body and chassis
- Body style: Open-wheel car
- Layout: Front Engine, RWD
- Related: Wolseley Hornet six

Powertrain
- Transmission: 4-speed Manual

Dimensions
- Wheelbase: 90.5 in (2,299 mm)
- Kerb weight: 350 kg (772 lb)

Chronology
- Successor: Ginetta G2

Ginetta G1 was a name applied retroactively to the Walklett brothers first effort, a homebuilt roadster based on the underpinnings of a pre-war Wolseley Hornet before Ginetta Cars was founded. As the Walkletts developed the Ginetta G2, they decided to start the numbering from their first build even though the car was no longer in existence. The only known documentation is a hand sketch drawn by Ivor Walklett.

== History ==
The G1 was a one off, not destined for production, based on a pre-war Wolseley Hornet six. The G1 was eventually wrecked by Ivor in the Walklett's driveway in Suffolk, destroyed in a crash against a tree stump. The car was styled after the Maserati 4CLT. The new body kit cut down on the weight of the Hornet considerably and was described as "great fun".
