= Daren Mk.1 =

Daren Mk.1 Daren Mk.1 GT Daren GT
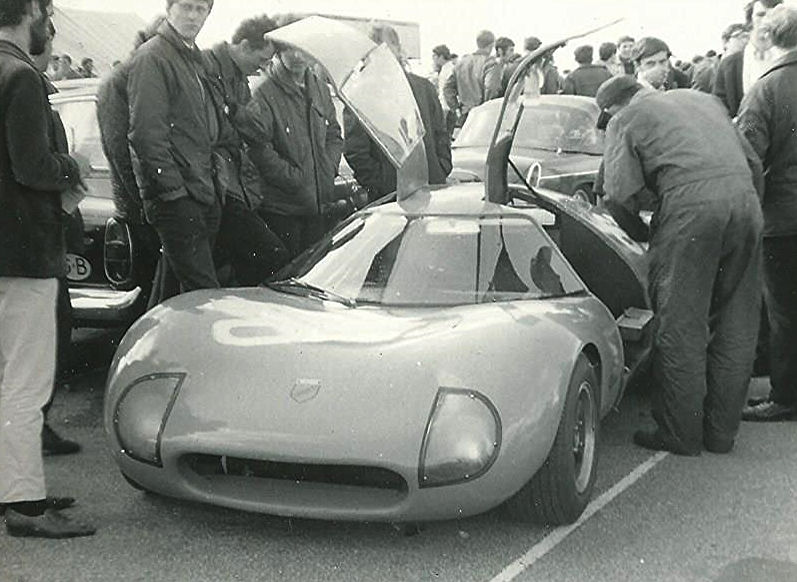
- The Daren Mk.1 GT at the Llandow Circuit in 1968
- Designer(s): John Green
- Production: 1
- Successor: Daren Mk.2 (Daren); Jerboa SP (John Green)

Technical specifications
- Chassis: Merlyn Mk11
- Length: 3,556 millimetres (140.0 in)
- Width: 1,498.6 millimetres (59.00 in)
- Height: 1,049 millimetres (41.3 in)
- Wheelbase: 1,905 millimetres (75.0 in)
- Engine: Longitudinally Mounted, Mid Engine, RWD
- Transmission: 5-speed Manual Hewland Mk5
- Weight: 1,180–1,350 pounds (540–610 kg)

Competition history
Entries	Races	Wins	Podiums
9	7	4	2
Poles	Titles		
1	0		

The Daren Mk.1 is the first car built by Daren Cars (now HydrauTug).

== History ==
Daren Cars was founded in 1967, by racing driver John Green. The car was built on the chassis of a Merlyn MK11 Formula Ford. The car was successful in racing, raced with several engines throughout its life, but would ultimately remain a one-off. The car was successful enough to draw in at least 2 orders. Still, John Green elected to develop the Daren Mk.2 instead of further developing the Mk.1. But before John Green started the Mk.2 development, he began building the Jerboa SP.

== Engines ==
Name	Engine Name	Displacement	Horsepower	HP RPM	Torque	Torque RPM
MK.1	Lotus-Ford Twin Cam	1,598 cc (97.5 cu in)	115 bhp (117 PS; 86 kW)	6,500	135 N⋅m (100 lb⋅ft)	3,800
Mk.1 GT	Holden FJ derived Holden grey	2,160 cc (132 cu in)	173 bhp (175 PS; 129 kW)	5,700	220 N⋅m (160 lb⋅ft)	2,500
MK.1/2 GT	Martin branded Cosworth FVD	1,975 cc (120.5 cu in)	275 bhp (279 PS; 205 kW)	9,000	300 N⋅m (220 lb⋅ft)	3,900
