= Stealth B6 =

Sports race car

- Category: GT1
- Production: 2000

Technical specifications
- Chassis: Steel tubular spaceframe, carbon fiber/glass body
- Suspension: double wishbones, push-rod actuated coil springs over shock absorbers, anti-roll bar
- Engine: Chevrolet 6.3–6.6 L (384.4–402.8 cu in) OHV V8 naturally-aspirated mid-engined
- Transmission: 6-speed sequential manual
- Power: 500–650 hp (370–480 kW); 479–520 lb⋅ft (649–705 N⋅m)
- Weight: 900 kg (2,000 lb)
- Brakes: Disc brakes
- Tires: Dunlop

Competition history
Races	Wins	Podiums	Poles
8	5	9	8

The Stealth B6 is a purpose-built grand tourer-style race car, designed, developed and built to GT1 rules and regulations, and used for sports car racing in 2000.
