= Ginetta G15 =

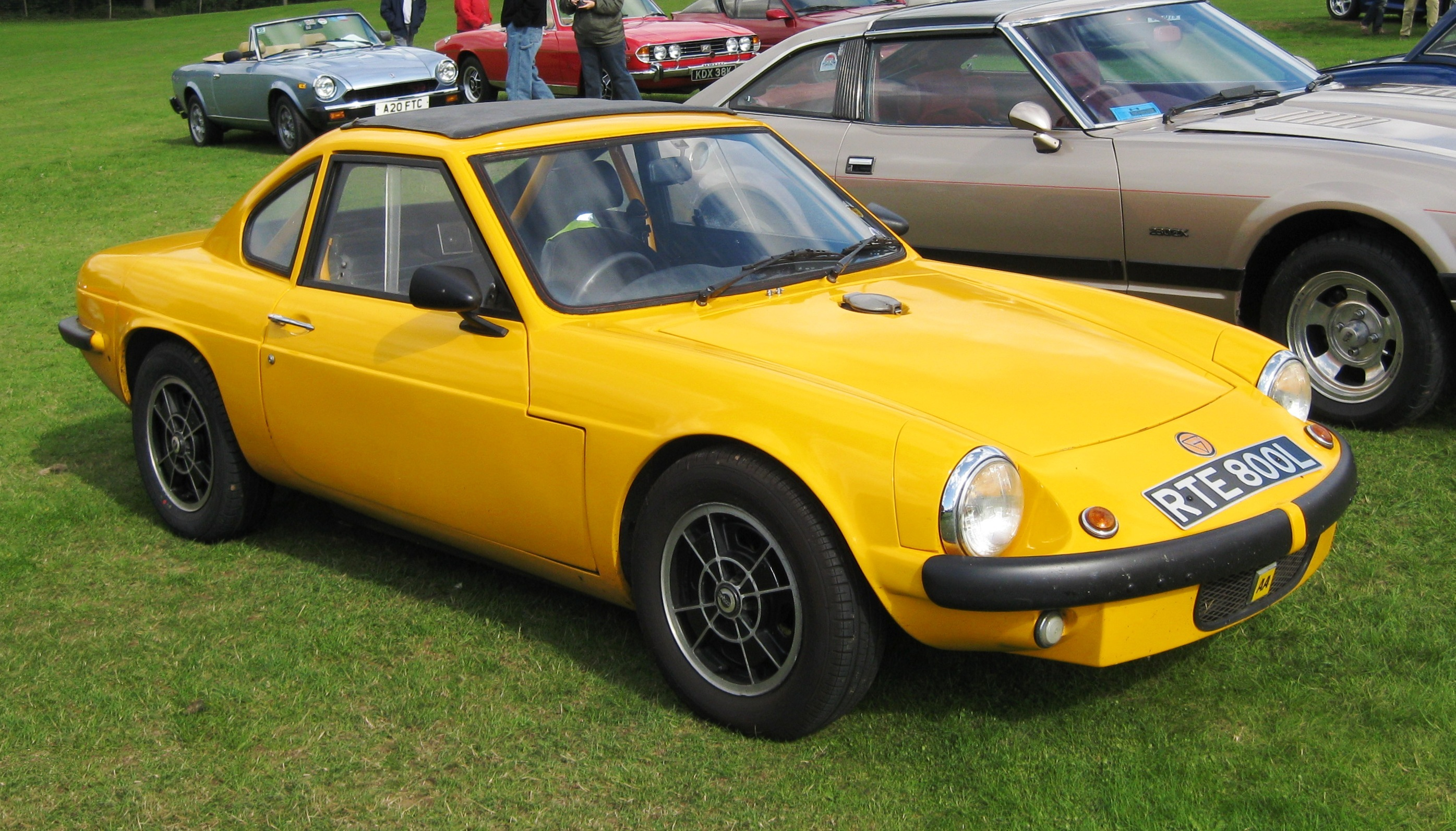

Overview
- Manufacturer: Ginetta Cars
- Production: 1968-1974 (approximately 800 produced)

Body and chassis
- Class: Sports car
- Body style: 2-door, 2-seater coupé
- Layout: RR layout
- Chassis: Tubular

Powertrain
- Engine: 875 cc/998 cc Rootes/Chrysler I4
- Transmission: 4-speed manual transaxle

Dimensions
- Wheelbase: 82 in (2,083 mm)
- Length: 144.5 in (3,670 mm)
- Width: 57 in (1,448 mm)
- Height: 44.5 in (1,130 mm)
- Curb weight: 1,232 lb (559 kg)

The Ginetta G15 is a two-seater, rear-engined sports car designed by Ivor Walklett and built by Ginetta Cars Limited in Witham, Essex between 1968 and 1974.

Ginetta entered into an arrangement with the Rootes Group in Coventry, England to supply the lightweight aluminium inline-4 cylinder, 875cc engines, a design inspired by the Coventry Climax FWMA, and 4-speed manual transaxles. The unique slanted angle of the Rootes Imp engine and the light weight meant the engine was well suited to the low body lines envisaged by Ivor for the G15 road-going sports car. Its coupé body was made of glass fibre from a single mould and formed part of the structure when mounted to the tubular steel chassis. The independent suspension used coil springs and dampers front and rear. The front suspension incorporated modified upper and lower wishbones of various Triumph cars: the TR4, TR6 Spitfire, and Herald. It featured an anti-roll bar, 9 inches (230 mm) disk brakes and 4×100mm PCD hubs. The rear suspension used trailing swingarms and drum brakes. The design featured a rear engine cover that swings up giving full access to the engine and various components. The wheels are 5.2 inches (130 mm) × 13 inches (330 mm). A flip-up filler in the centre of the nose fills the fuel tank which is either a steel tank holding 18 liters (4.8 U.S. gal) or a 26 liters (6.9 U.S. gal) fiberglass tank. Also in the front is the radiator, with the spare wheel behind it. The battery was mounted to the passenger side front compartment ahead of the wheel. Weight was approximately 1,230 pounds (560 kg) depending on configuration.

== Evolution ==
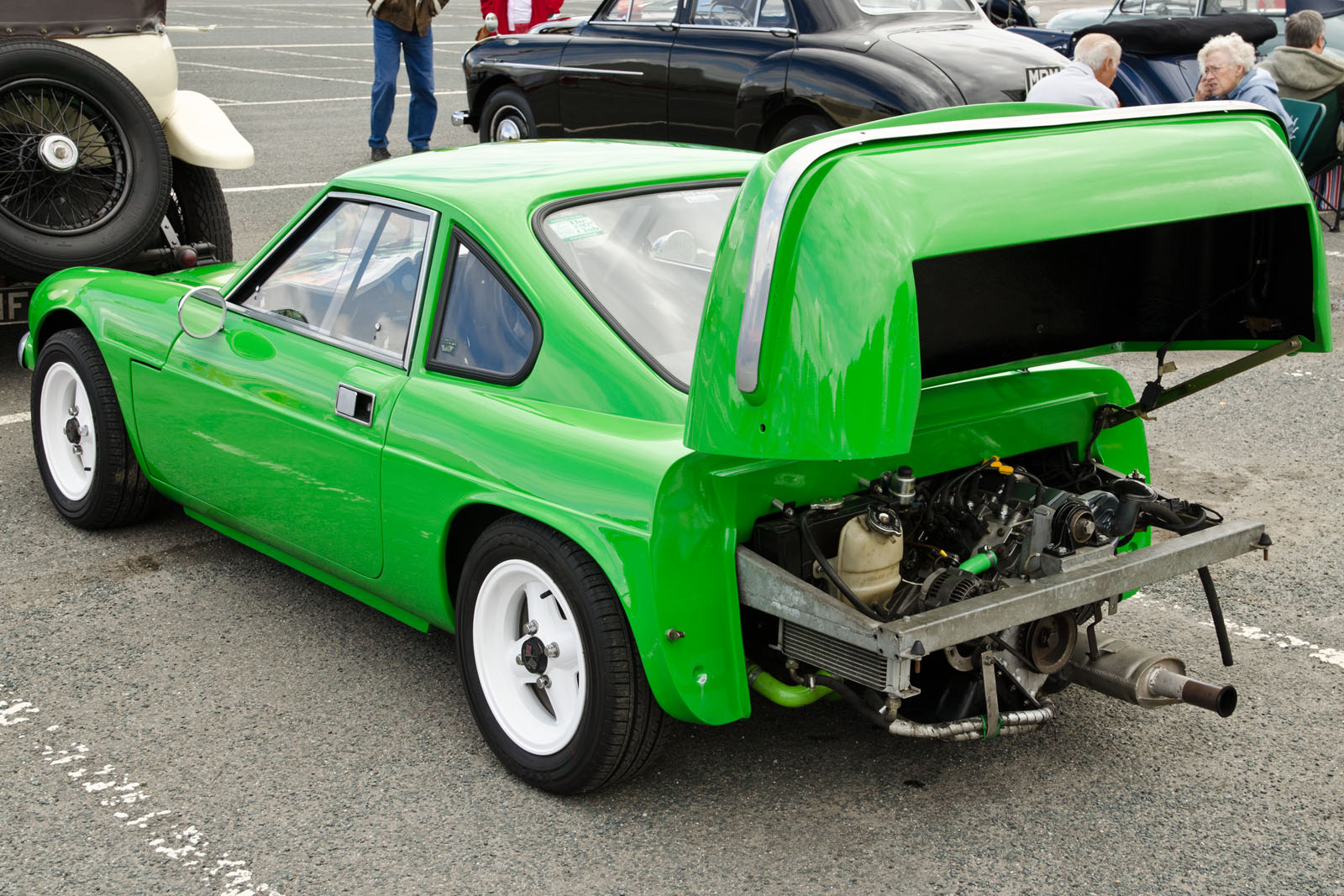
Ginetta G15 (1974 model)

The first prototype G15, painted in 'moonstone white' was exhibited at the 1967 International Motor Show at London's Earl Court next to Ginetta's G12 racing car. As the rear-mounted Sunbeam Imp cooling radiator of the first few cars sometimes overheated, the Mk II version of 1969 had a front mounted radiator with electric fan. The interior got a revised dashboard with Smiths and AC gauges and an improved steel-tube frame and fiberglass form seats. A heater and windscreen washer were optional extras. The 1970 MK III had larger rear quarter light windows. Engine options also became available; the 875cc (~55 bhp/52 lb ft torque) was offered as standard and a 998cc (65 bhp) version of the Rootes Rallye Imp engine was later offered by Ginetta for an extra £100 in the G15S. The original wheels with aluminium trim were replaced with Cosmic or Minilite alloys as displayed in a 1969 motor show.
