= Ginetta Cars =

British automobile manufacturer

Ginetta Cars Limited

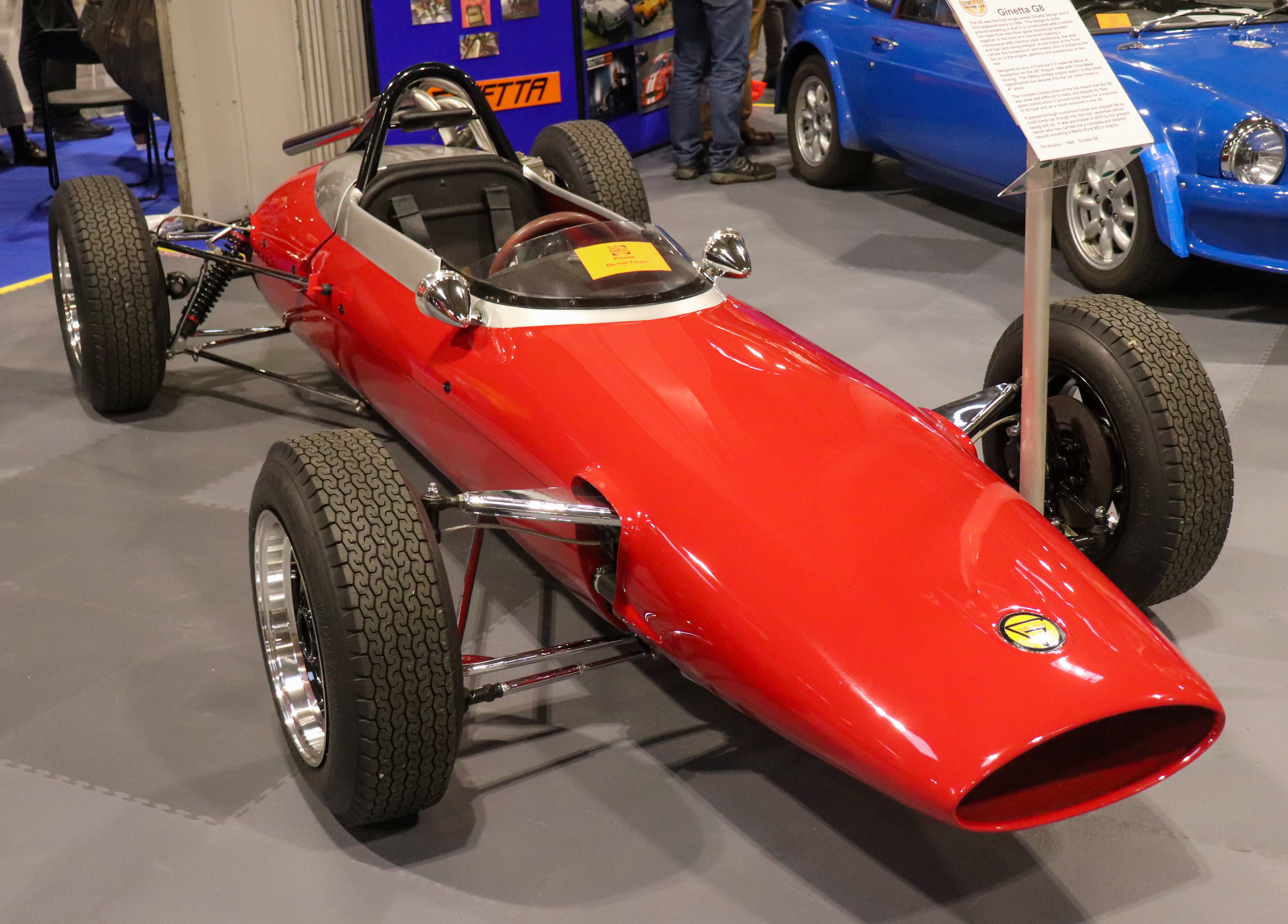
- 1964 Ginetta G8 at the 2019 NEC Classic Motor Show
- Type: Private
- Industry: Automotive
- Founded: 1958
- Founders: Bob Walklett; Ivor Walklett; Trevers Walklett; Douglas Walklett
- Headquarters: Leeds, West Yorkshire, England
- Key people: Lawrence Tomlinson (Chairman)
- Products: Sports cars
- Parent: LNT Group
- Website: www.ginetta.com

Ginetta Cars Limited is a British specialist builder of racing and sports cars based in Garforth, Leeds, West Yorkshire.

== History ==
=== 20th century ===
Ginetta was founded in 1958 by four Walklett brothers (Bob, Ivor, Trevers and Douglas) in Woodbridge, Suffolk. The first car was built in 1957 and subsequently became known as the Ginetta G1; it was based on a pre-war Wolseley Hornet six. The first car built was the 1958 Ginetta G2, a cycle-fendered "special" using Ford 10hp mechanicals. The Walklett Brothers briefly also offered a kit car body called the Fairlite, a glass-fibre body shell priced at £49 for fitting to a Ford 8 or 10hp chassis.

The four Walklett brothers each had their areas of expertise: Bob was the managing director, Douglas was the mechanical engineer and also handled the electrical work, Ivor was the designer and Trevers was the stylist, working closely with Ivor.

From their original base, the company moved to Witham, Essex, in 1962, and between 1972 and 1974 operated from larger premises in Ballingdon Street adjacent to the railway bridge Sudbury, Suffolk, before returning to Witham. In 1988, the Walklett brothers needed bigger premises and so moved the company to Scunthorpe where they could expand. On 7 November 1989, the Walkletts sold Ginetta to an international group of enthusiasts, based in Sheffield and run by managing director Martin Phaff. Ginetta was in a strong financial position at the time of its sale and the Walkletts went on to retire.

Under Phaff, the company went on to produce the Ginetta G20 and the Ginetta G33. It was during this period that the company hit troubled times. After selling Ginetta, brothers Trevor and Ivor Walklett went on to form a new company called Design And Research Engineering (DARE) with the intent of manufacturing new copies of some of Ginetta's old designs, like the G4 and G12 – for which there were considerable demand, particularly in Japan. In 1994, Ginetta's Swedish importer Ingemar Engström formed a company for manufacturing a Volvo-engined version of the G34 there, called Gin1Car AB (pronounced "ginett car" in Swedish). Production started in 1997, before ending abruptly the following year.

=== 21st century ===
In late 2005, Ginetta was acquired by LNT Automotive, a company run by racing car driver, engineer and businessman Lawrence Tomlinson.

In mid-2007, Ginetta moved to a factory near Leeds, with a target to sell 200 cars per year. Tomlinson himself penned the base specification for the Ginetta G50, which marked 50 years of Ginetta production and became a successful GT4 car.

In March 2010, Ginetta acquired the Somerset-based sports car manufacturer Farbio, and re-badged their car as the Ginetta F400. In March 2011, Ginetta launched the G55, which competed in the Michelin Ginetta GT Supercup and was built to comply to the GT3 class regulations. In October 2011, Ginetta launched the G60, a two-door mid-engine sports car developed from the F400 and powered by a Ford-sourced 3.7-litre V6 engine.

In 2017, Ginetta acquired Blyton Park test circuit near Gainsborough, Lincolnshire, as a proving track to help develop road and race models.

In 2021 the Ginetta G56 was launched.

== Models ==
Models produced by Ginetta include the following:

=== G2 ===
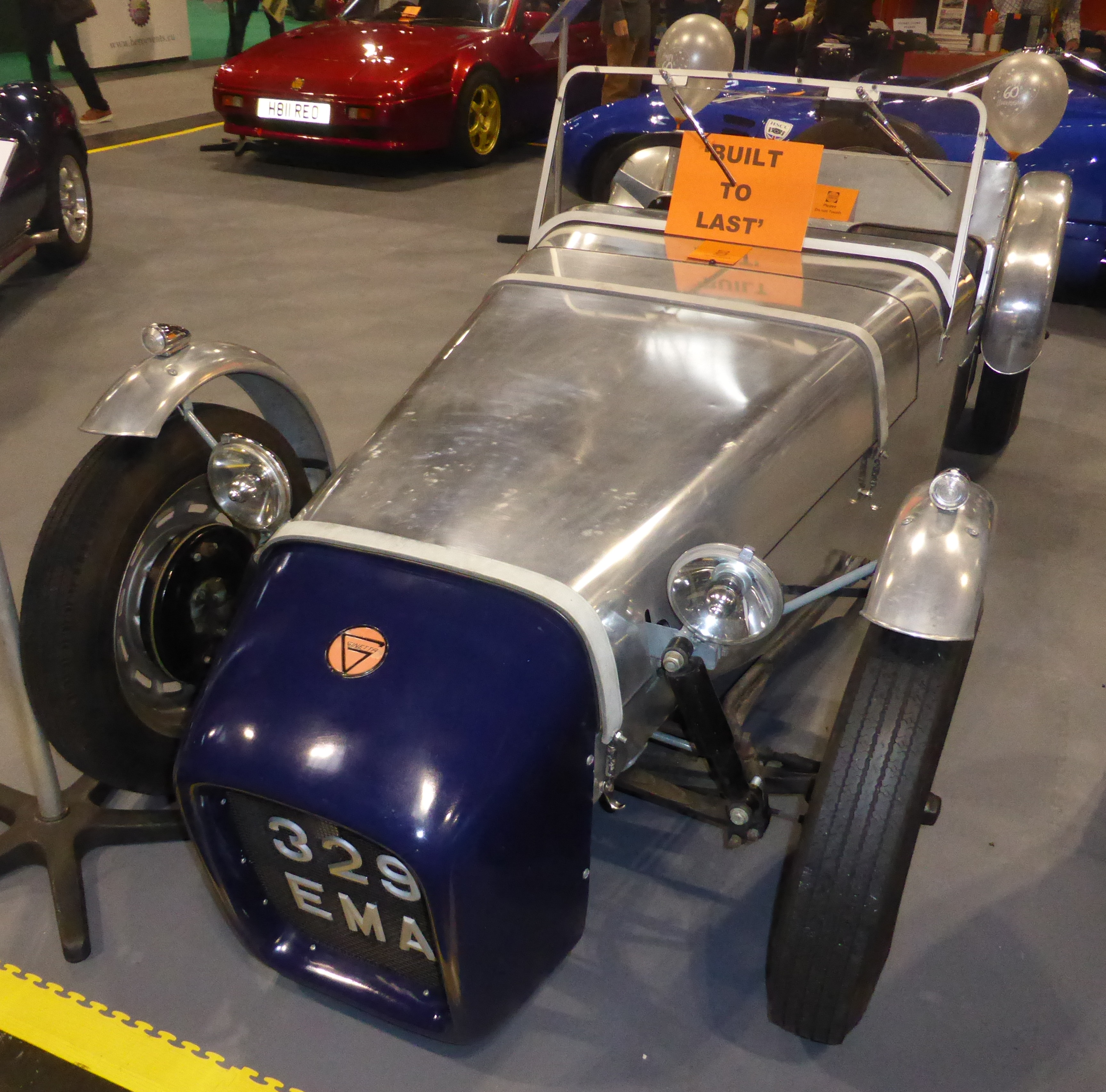
1958 Ginetta G2 at NEC 2018

Ginetta's first car, the G2, was produced as a kit car for enthusiasts and consisted of a tubular frame chassis to take Ford components and aluminium body. About 100 were produced.

=== G3 and G4 ===
The glass fibre-bodied G3 arrived in 1959 and was succeeded by the G4 in 1961. Unlike Ginetta's earlier efforts, the G4 could also be used as an everyday car while remaining competitive in motorsports. Production stopped in 1968 after about 500 had been built, but was revived in 1981 with the Series IV which was 2 in (51 mm) wider and 3 in (76 mm) longer than the III; production of this version ended in 1984.

=== G10 and G11 ===
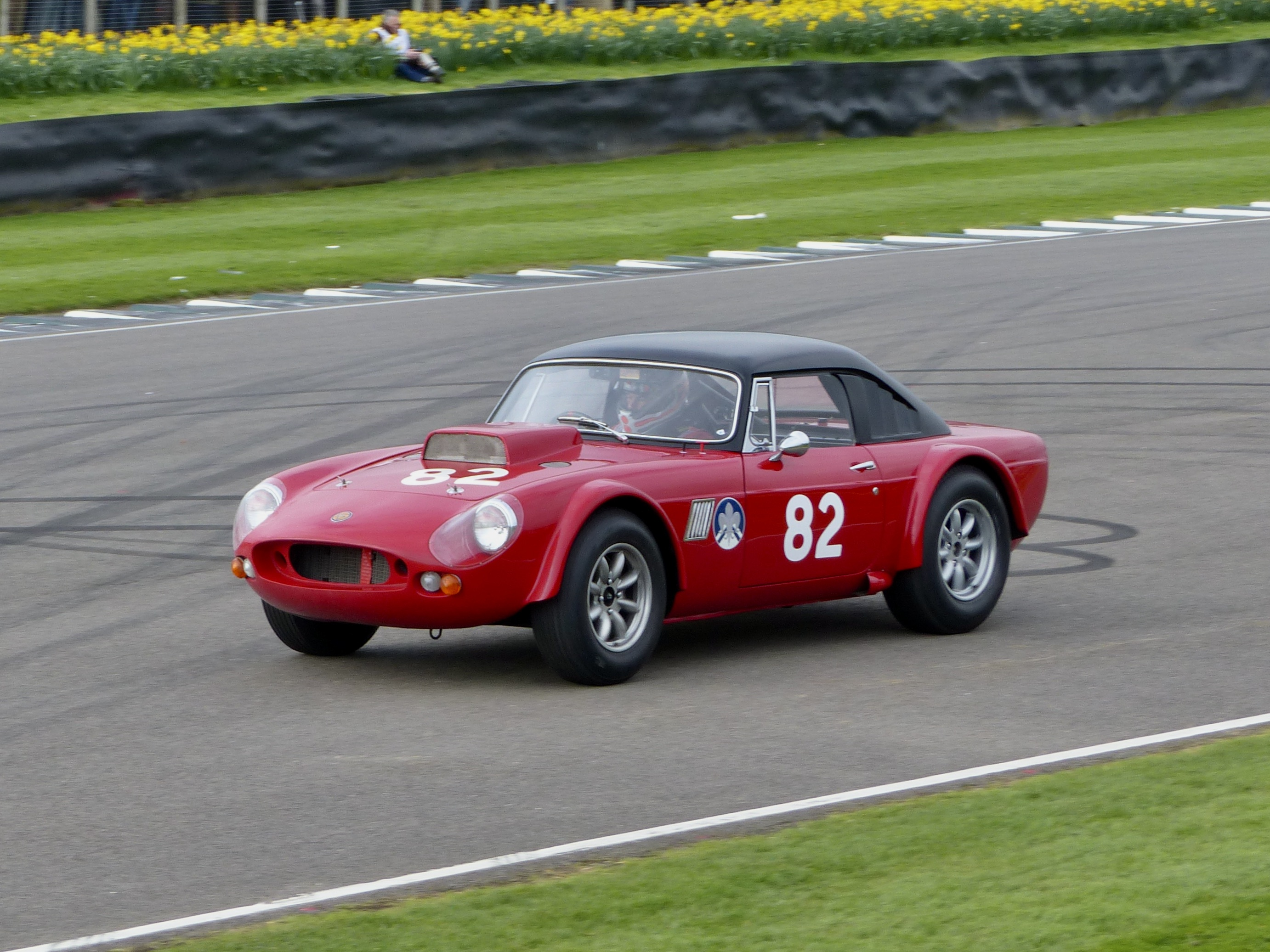
Ginetta G10 with James Guess at the wheel, Goodwood Members Meeting 2017

Launched at the 1965 Racing car show, the Ginetta G10 was meant to be a more powerful racing car than its predecessors. Weighing around 2,000 lb (900 kg) and fitted with a 289 cu in (4.7 L) V8 engine from the Ford Mustang, it was well received by the enthusiasts. Ginetta works driver Chris Meek secured a win with a prototype at the car's debut at Brands Hatch, beating a Jaguar E-Type which was considered to be the most successful GT racing car. However Ginetta failed to make a homologated version of the G10 in order for it to keep competing and as a result, it was forced out of the competition with a total production of only three cars. Following the reception the G10 had generated, Ginetta produced the G11, a street legal version of the G10 with the same body but with the Ford V8 replaced by the MGB 1800 engine. However, slow deliveries of the engine curbed production of the car and therefore only a handful were made.

=== G12 ===
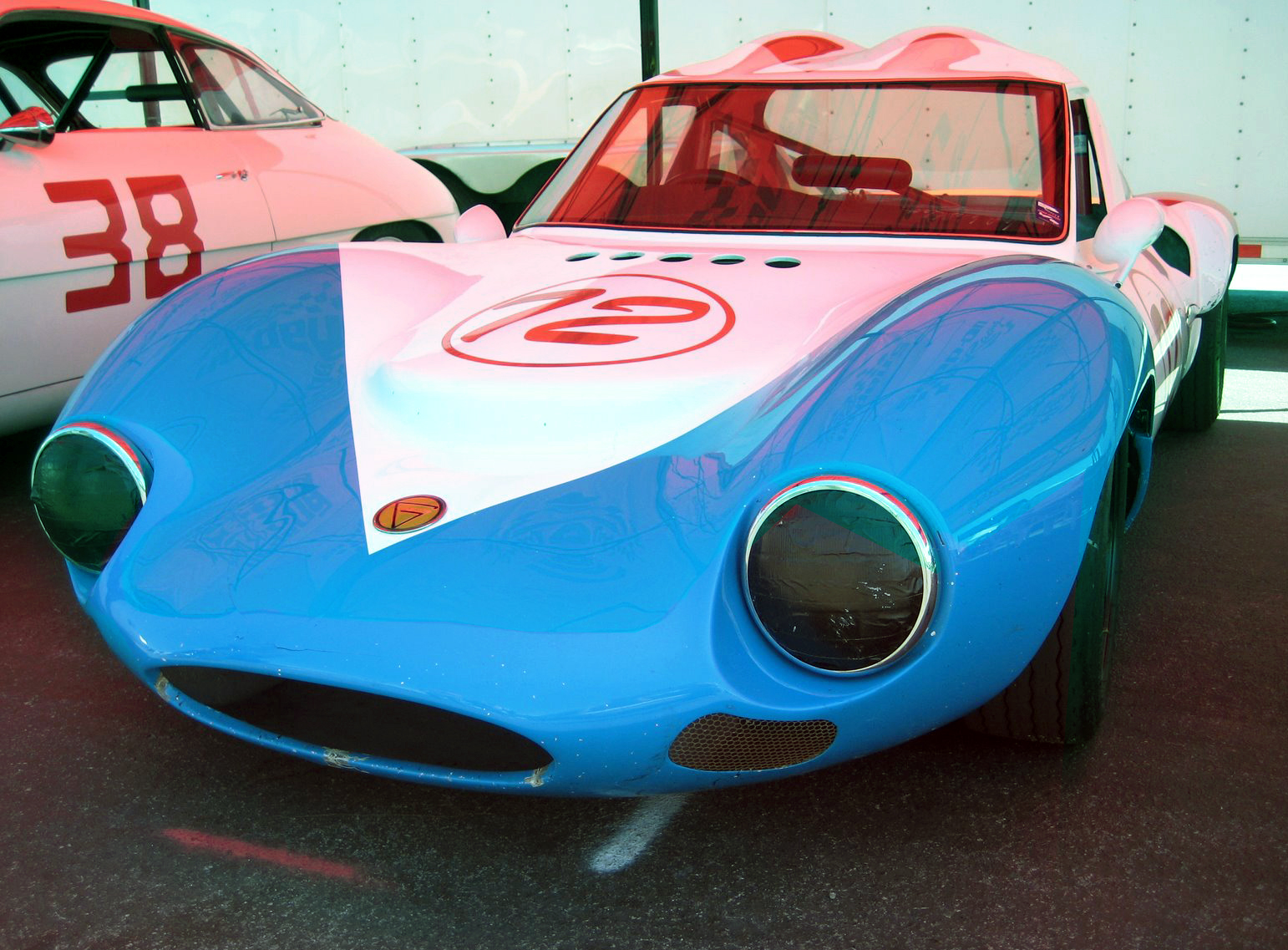
Ginetta G12

Unveiled in 1966, the G12 was an evolution of the G4 but had many new features that made it stand apart from its predecessors. The car had a new tubular steel space frame chassis, with the cockpit section mounted to it for extra strength, while removable body work allowed for easy repair. The front suspension consisted of Triumph-derived uprights and double wishbones (with camber adjustment courtesy of rose-joints on the upper items) and coil springs. While, at the rear, the usual arrangement of single upper transverse links with lower reversed wishbones (with rose-joints) and radius arms was present, along with coil springs. The car was fitted with anti-roll bars for increased safety, and the Triumph-sourced Girling disc brakes at the front and rear ensured increased stopping power. Power came from a 1.0-litre Cosworth SCA inline-four engine, though larger engines were fitted later such as an Aston Martin V8, but were less successful. The G12 dominated the competition in its class, outclassing Lotus Elan 26Rs and Coventry Climaxes, winning the 1,150 cc MN series. Outside track racing, the G12 also found success at hill climb events, before it was replaced by the G16. Approximately 28 were built, though at least 1 was converted into the Jerboa SP.

=== G15 ===
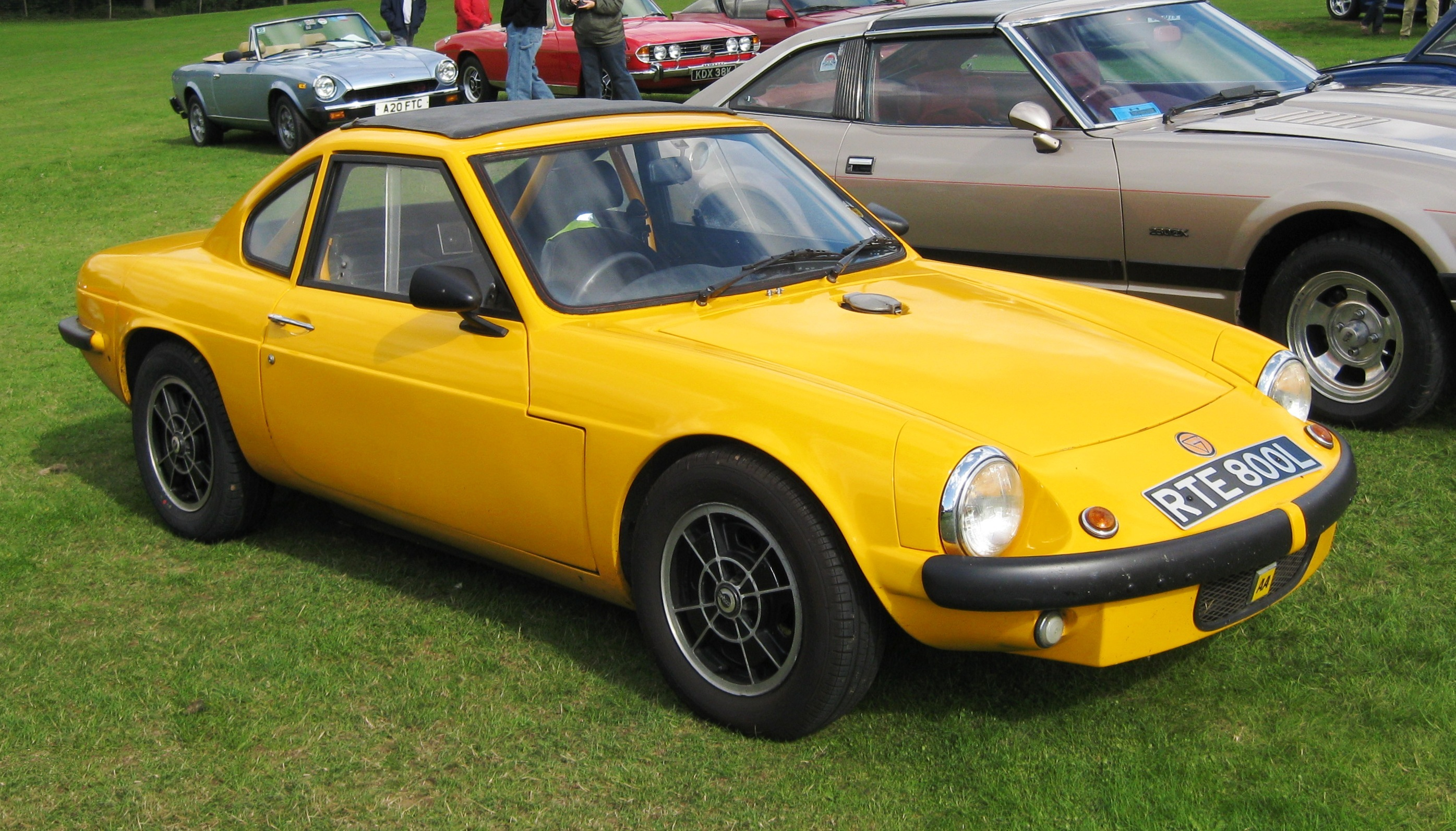
1969 Ginetta G15

In 1967 the G15, utilizing a rear-mounted 875 cc Sunbeam Imp engine, was launched. This two-seat coupé had a glass fibre body bolted to a tube chassis and used Imp rear and Triumph front suspension. Approximately 800 were produced from 1967 to 1974 and the car was fully type approved allowing for complete Ginetta cars to be sold for the first time. Eight G15s were produced with Volkswagen engines and called "Super S".

=== G16 ===
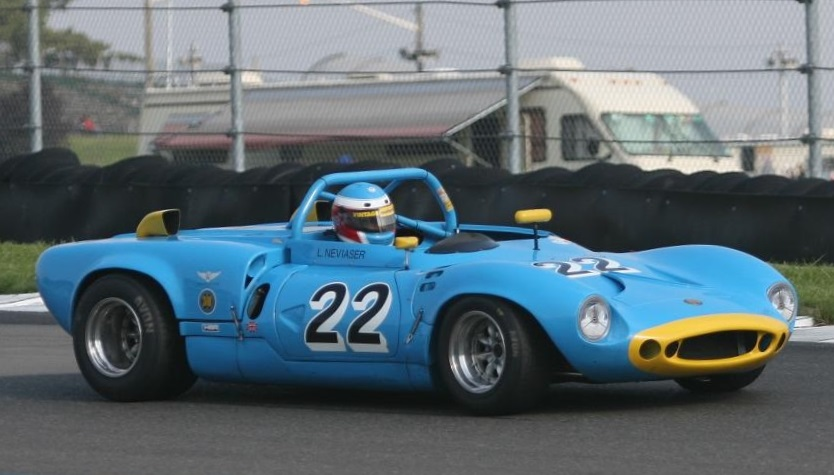
Ginetta G16

The G16 was produced as a Group 6 sports-racer in 1968-1969. Buyers installed engines of choice; known fitments include BRM, Coventry Climax, Cosworth FVA and BMW units of 2 litres capacity. Ten examples were built, but it did not prove particularly successful in competition.

=== G19 ===
The G19 was a single seater Formula 3 racing car of which only one was produced.

=== G20 ===
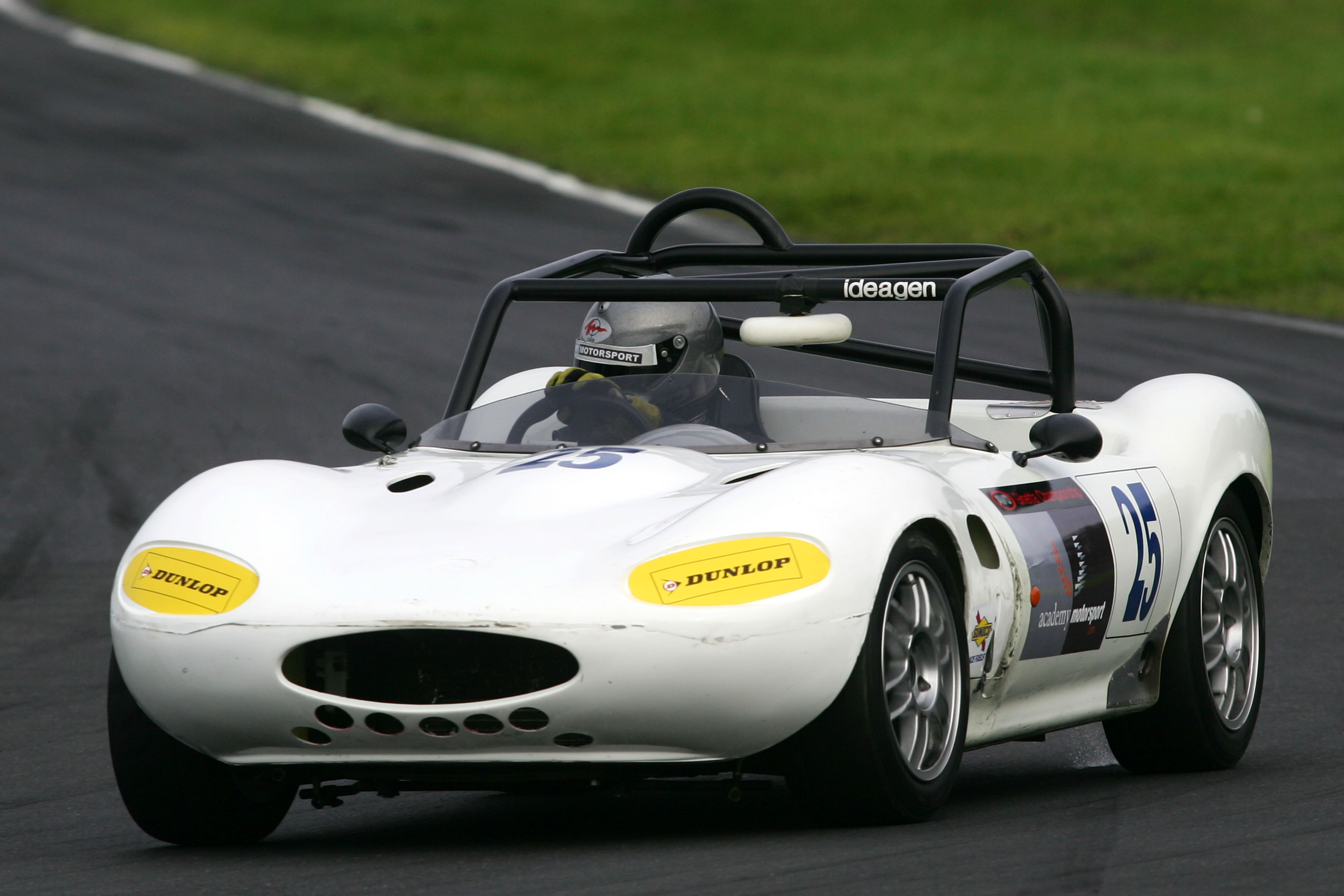
2005 Ginetta G20

Appearing in 2001 the G20 was a light racing car, similar to the earlier G27 which it gradually replaced. It competed in the Ginetta Championship single-make racing series; about 200 examples were built. The G20 was cheapier and easier to build than the G27, lacking doors and various other items required in a street-legal car. "G20" was also the name for a projected single-seat Formula 1 racer with a BRM V12 engine; the name was also considered for a V6-engined road car discussed in the 1970s.

=== G21 ===
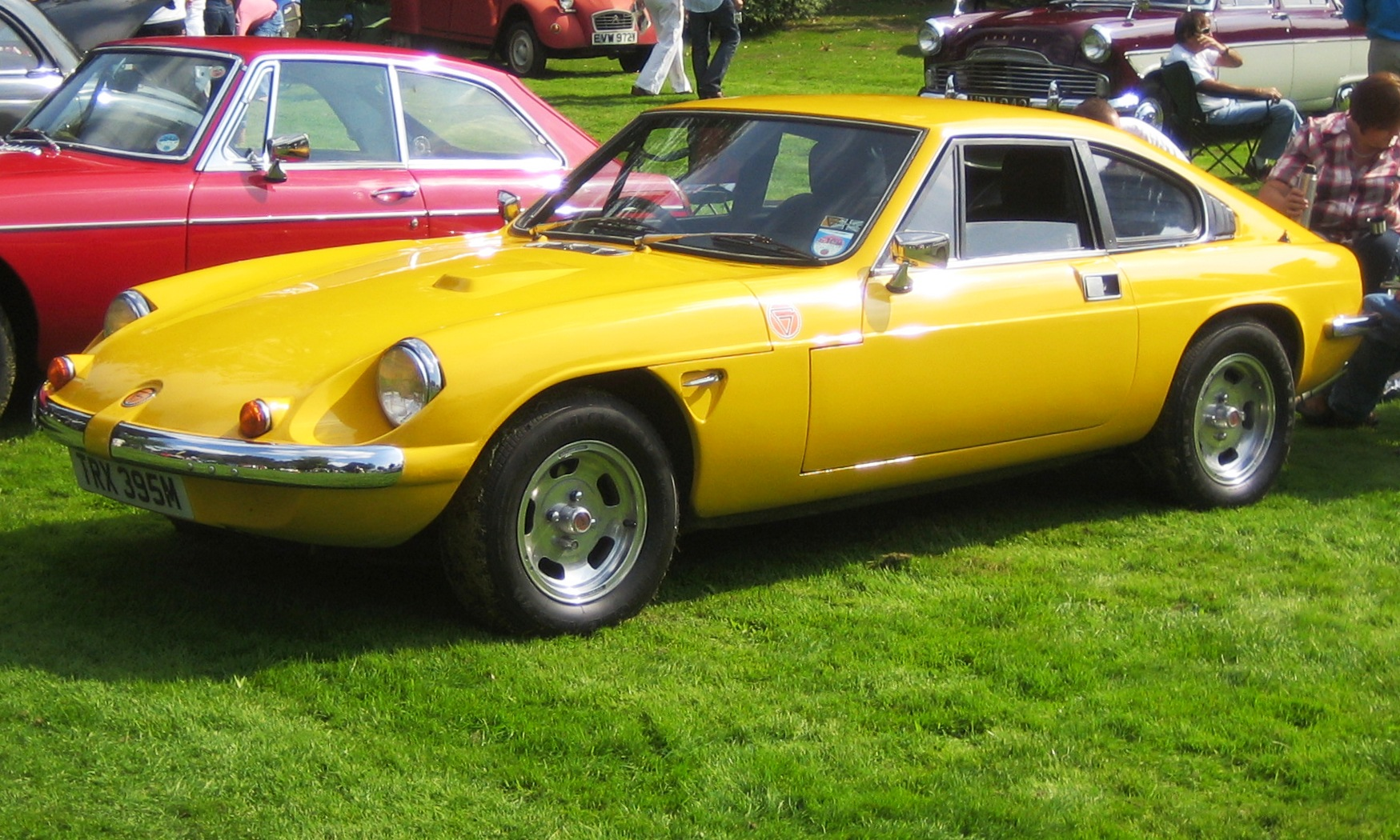
1974 Ginetta G21

In 1970, the G15 was joined by the larger G21, which was initially available with either a four-cylinder, 1.7-litre sourced from the Rootes Group (Sunbeam) or a 3.0-litre Ford Essex V6 engine. The car largely used Rootes components. The 1.7-litre Sunbeam Rapier engine subsequently became the standard four-cylinder engine for the car. 80 cars in total were produced before production ceased in 1974 due to the oil crisis. The car was later morphed into an open top G23 and G24 coupé version but none of those variants went to production.

=== GRS Tora ===
Trevor Walklett owned a 1968 Hillman Hunter which had been put up due to rust. Inspired by the success of the Dutton Sierra estate kit car, Ginetta developed a Range Rover-inspired fibreglass station wagon body for installation onto the Hunter's underpinnings. Called the GRS Tora Mark I it was first shown in October 1982, going on sale the next year. Although it was a two-door estate, it used the front doors of a four-door Hunter. These are shorter than a normal two-door design, leading to limited rear seat access and somewhat awkward proportions. More troubling was that the Hunter's fuel tank and filler location meant that the rear gate opening was very high, limiting the cars utility. In October 1983, a GRS Tora Pickup was shown. In August 1984, the GRS Tora Mark II started deliveries. This version rectified the concerns with the rear opening, with a relocated fuel tank (and filler now mounted on the flank of the car) allowing for a full-height rear gate. Being more expensive than the simpler Mark I model the two were offered side by side. Sales of the GRS Tora helped Ginetta stay afloat in the 1980s, but by 1988 Tora production gradually came to a halt as the market was changing and donor cars were becoming rarer.

At the July 1989 Newark Kit Car Show, Ginetta showed a GRS Tora Mark III. Unlike previous models, this was a four-door estate (of a rather beefy appearance) on Ford Cortina saloon underpinnings. It used the doors as well as the taillights of a Mark IV Cortina four-door saloon, and had Cortina engines or the option of a Perkins diesel. Only two were built, and Ginetta went back to its main business of making sports cars. All in all, about 320 Toras of all variants were built.

=== G26, G28, G30 and G31 ===
Following reorganization, the company moved to Scunthorpe and began making cars in kit form again in the 1980s starting with the G27 and followed by the G26, G28, G30 and G31, with all cars using Ford parts. The G26 was the first model to arrive, in 1984. The G26 and G31 both used flip-up headlamps; the G26 and G30 were fastback coupés while the G28 and G31 had a notchback profile.

The design used the Ford Cortina Mk3/Mk4 drivetrain and parts installed in a galvanized steel chassis of Ginetta's own construction. Originally, only four-cylinder engines could be fitted, but the G28's taller bonnetline made room for Ford's Cologne V6 engine. The bodywork was fibreglass, although the doors were the Ford Fiesta's steel units. The rear window on the fastback designs was also from the Fiesta, while the sportier notchbacks used the small window from the Sierra XR4i. 280 G26 were built. While the G31 was the last addition to the G26 line, it sold pretty well, with around 70 cars finished. Six G28 and fourteen G30 were finished, although since these cars were only available as kits it is unknown how many kits were actually sold. The total production of the G26 and its derivatives is about 370 cars.

The G29 code was assigned to a one-off competition car for the Thundersports racing series.

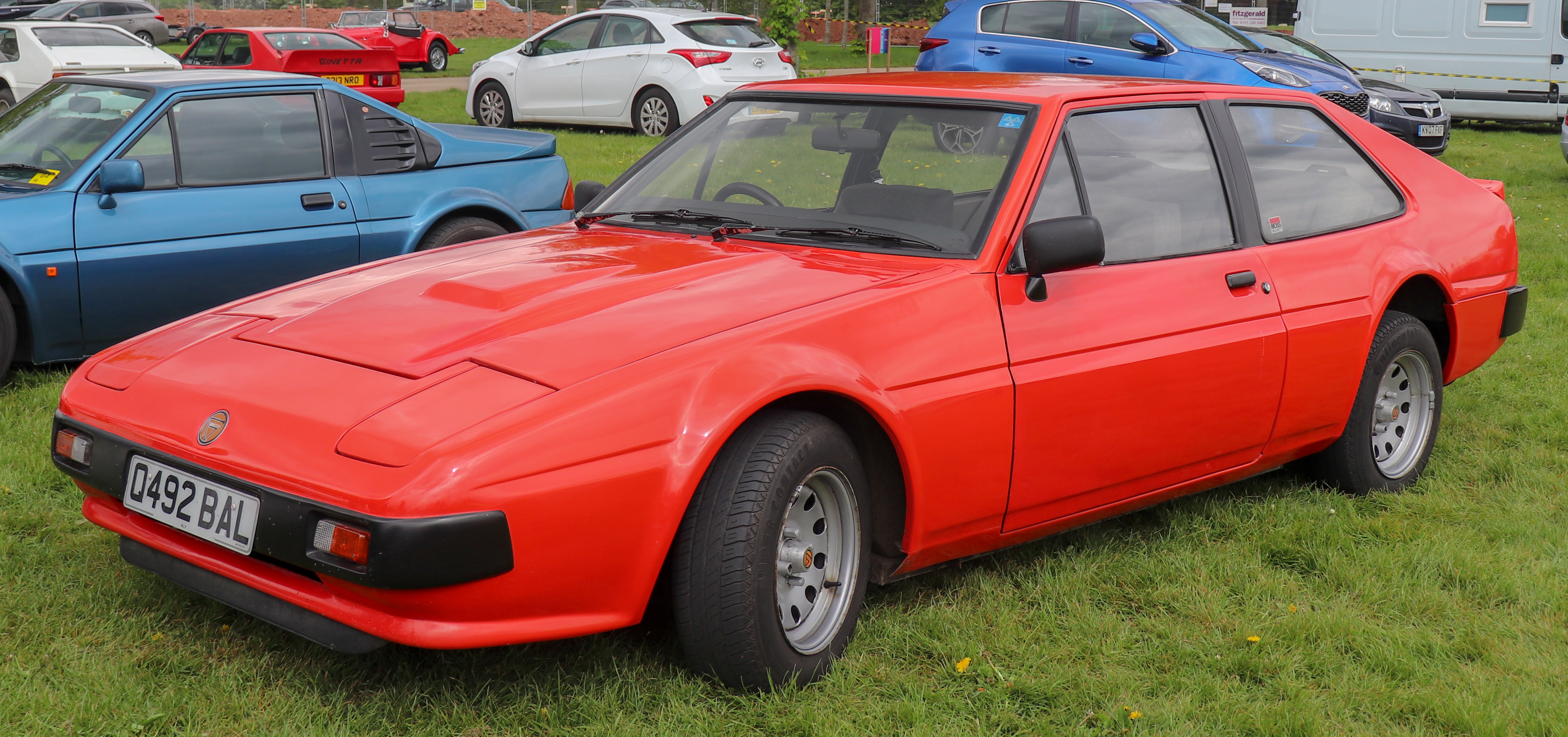
Ginetta G26

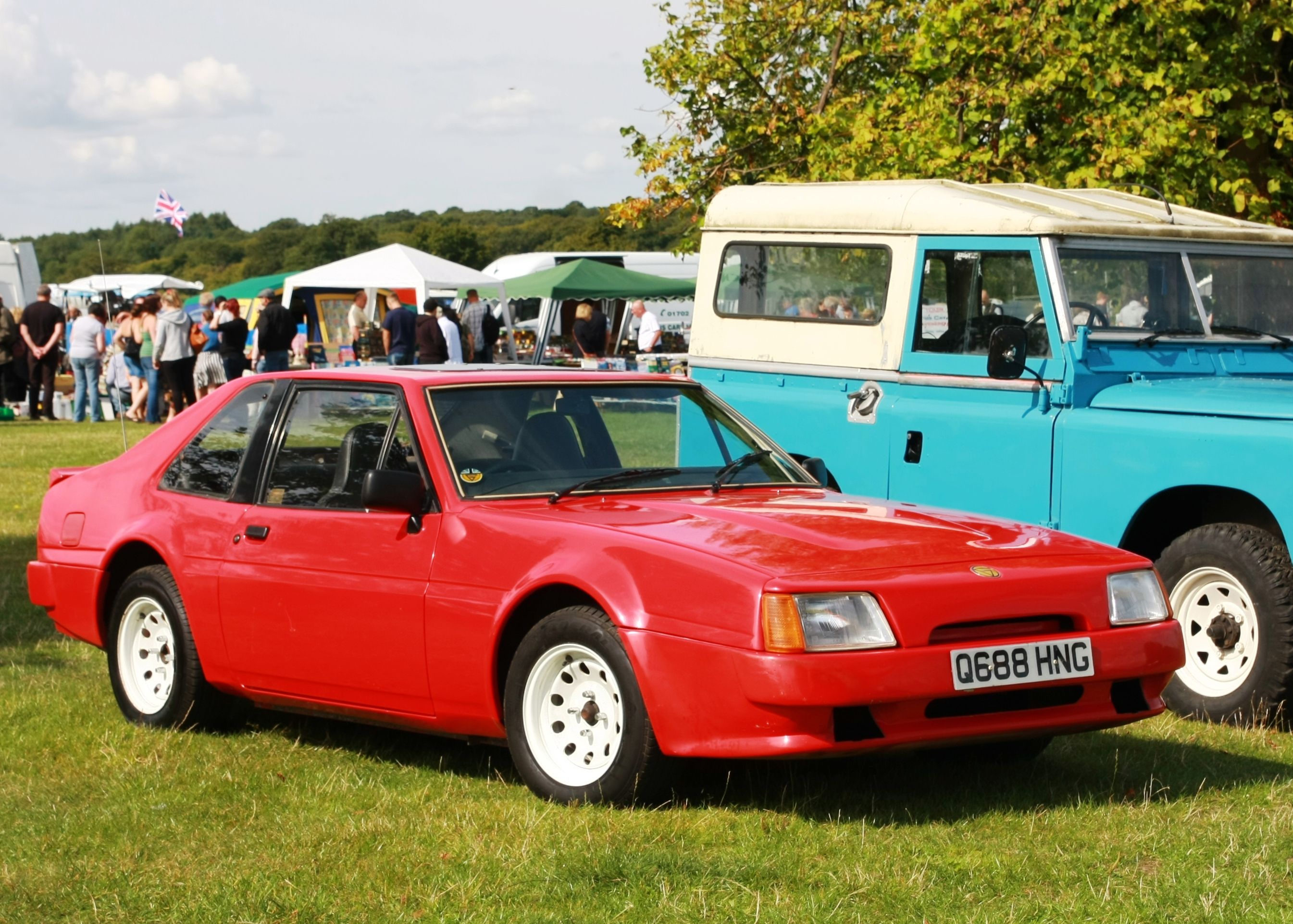
1987 Ginetta G28

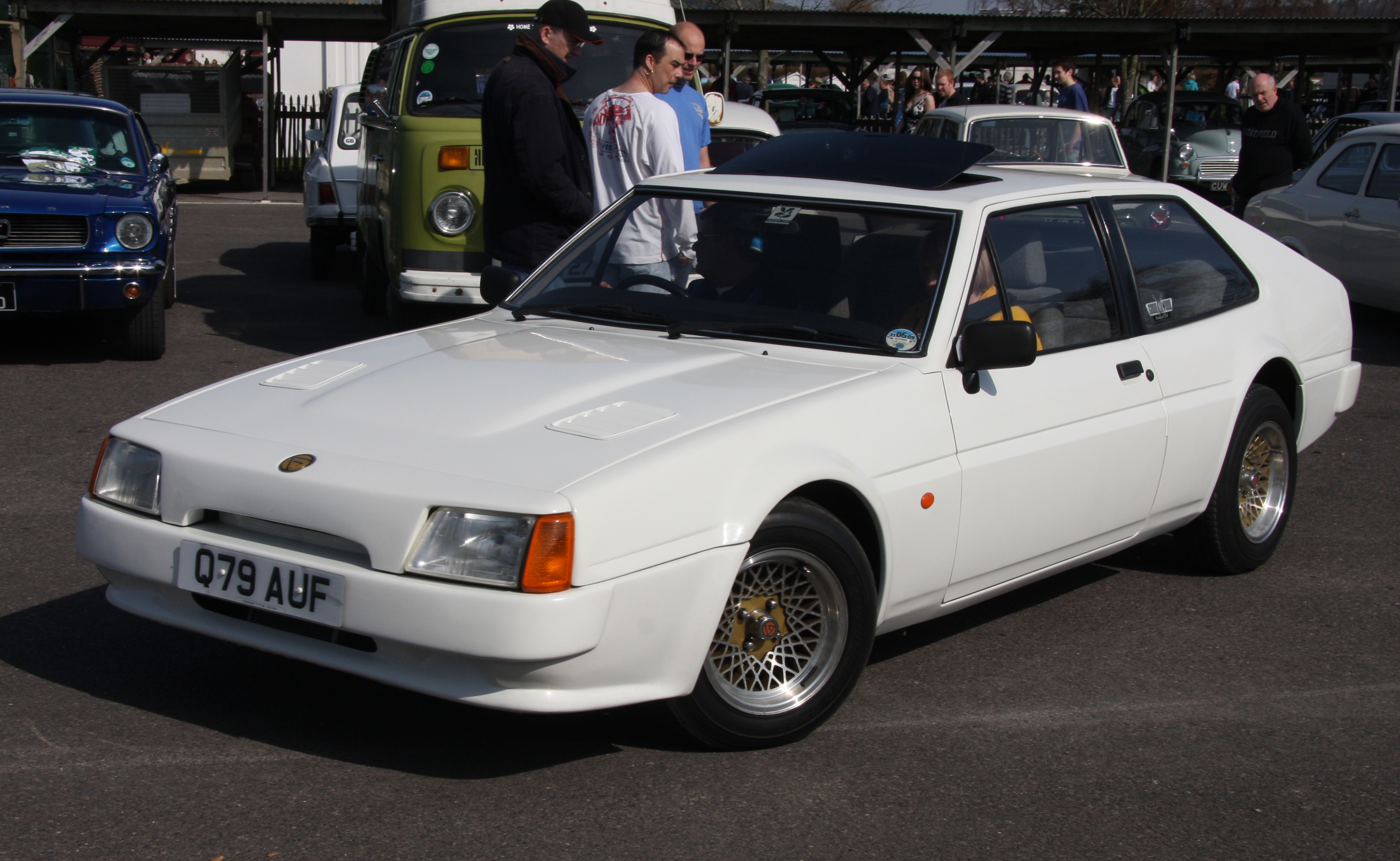
1988 Ginetta G30

=== G27, G33, and G34 ===
Introduced in 1985, the G27 was a two-seater sports car derived from the G4. Designed by Mark Walklett, it uses the front suspension from the Triumph Vitesse, a modified Jaguar independent rear suspension, and could be fitted with a wide range of engines up to the Rover V8. The G33 speedster was introduced in 1990; derived from the G27 it was typically equipped with a Rover V8 engine and was accordingly faster. In terms of appearance, the windshield, with its body-coloured frame, was the main difference compared to the G27, while the overall appearance was smoothed off, with various creases and folds removed. The G33 was soon offered as a kit as well, which left room for the G34, a version with a turbocharged Volvo four-cylinder engine and only offered as a fully built and type approved car. After considerable delays, 21 examples were built by Ginetta's Swedish importer in 1997 and 1998 after.

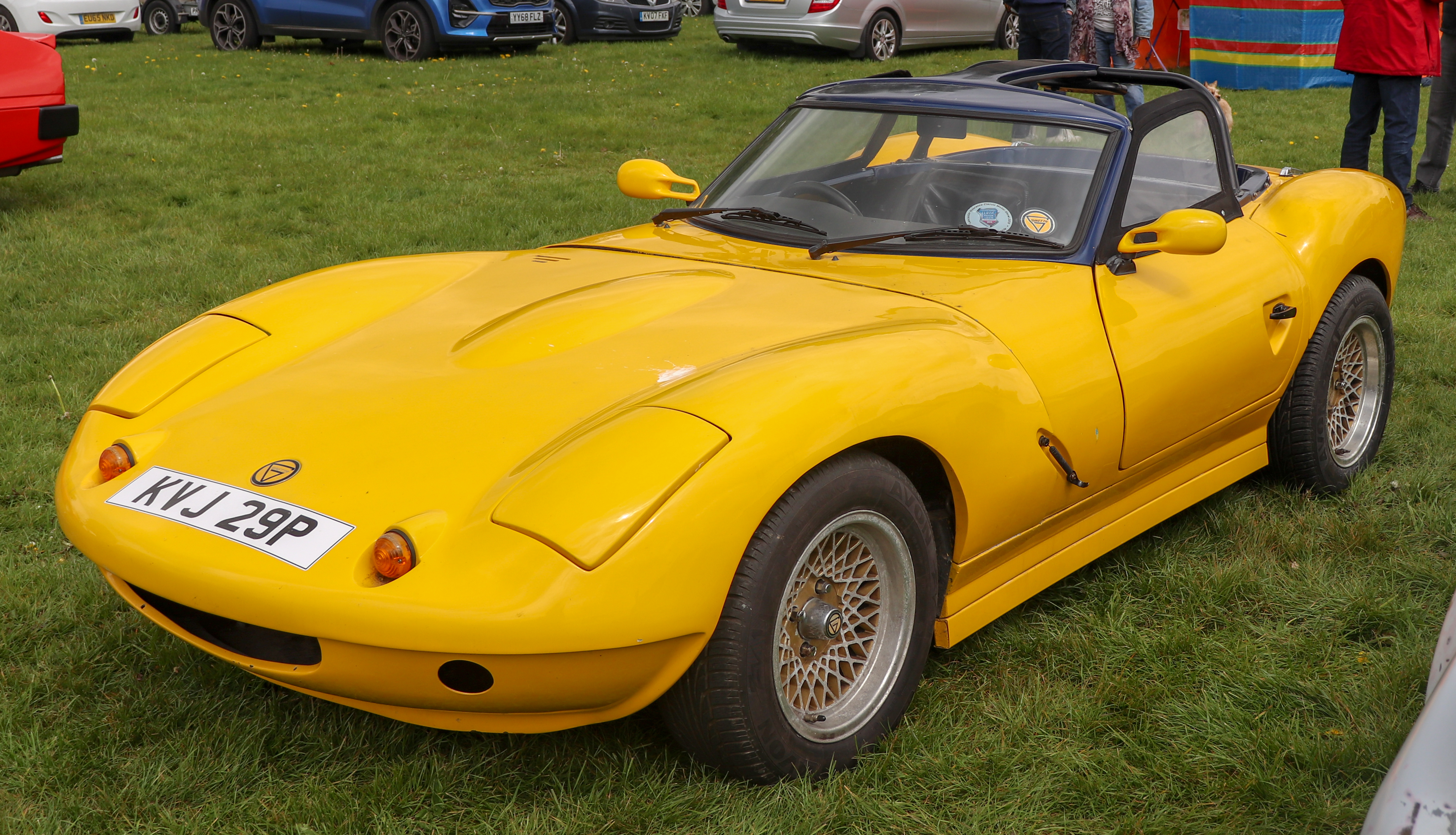
Ginetta G27

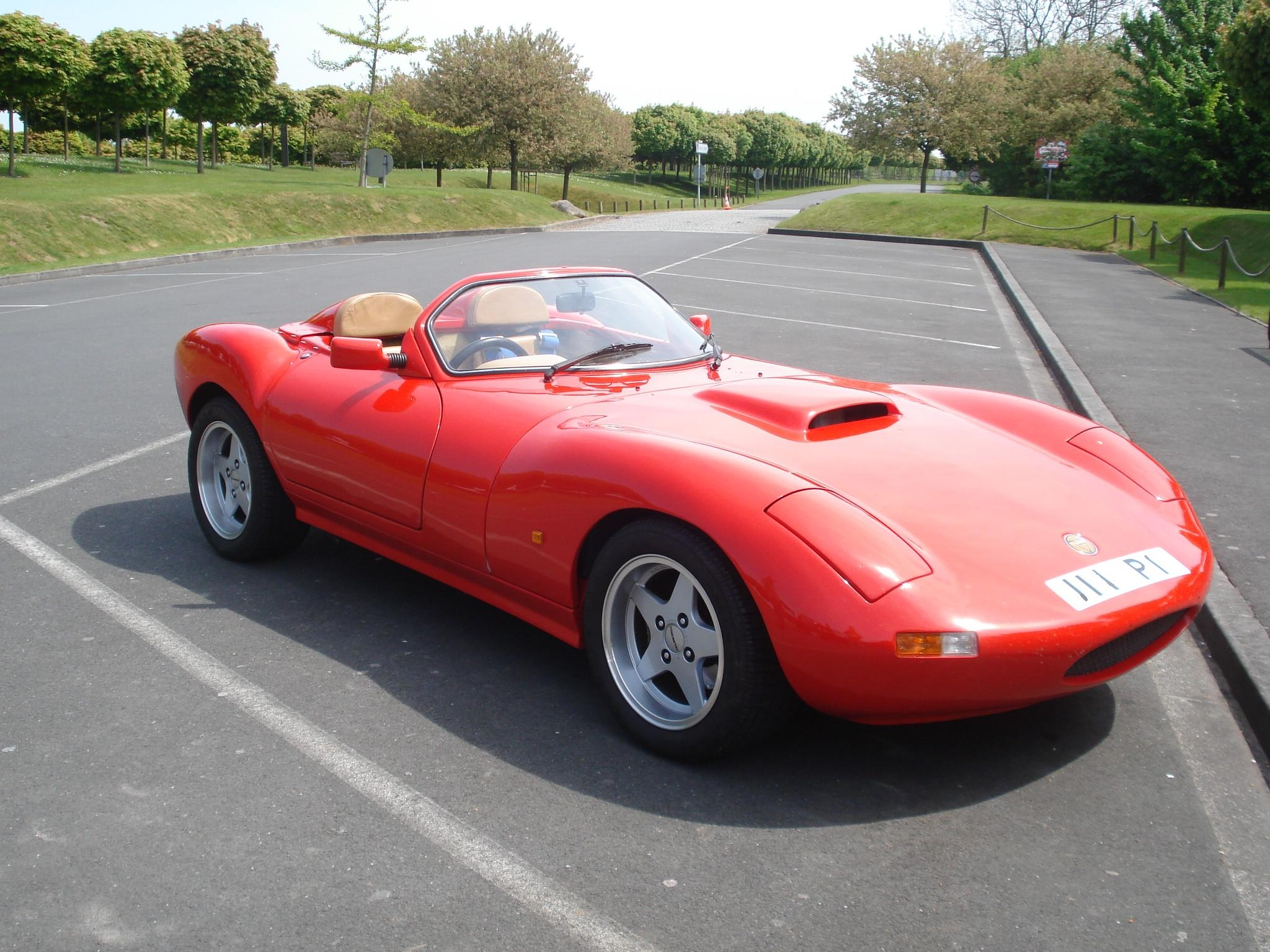
1992 Ginetta G33

=== G32 ===
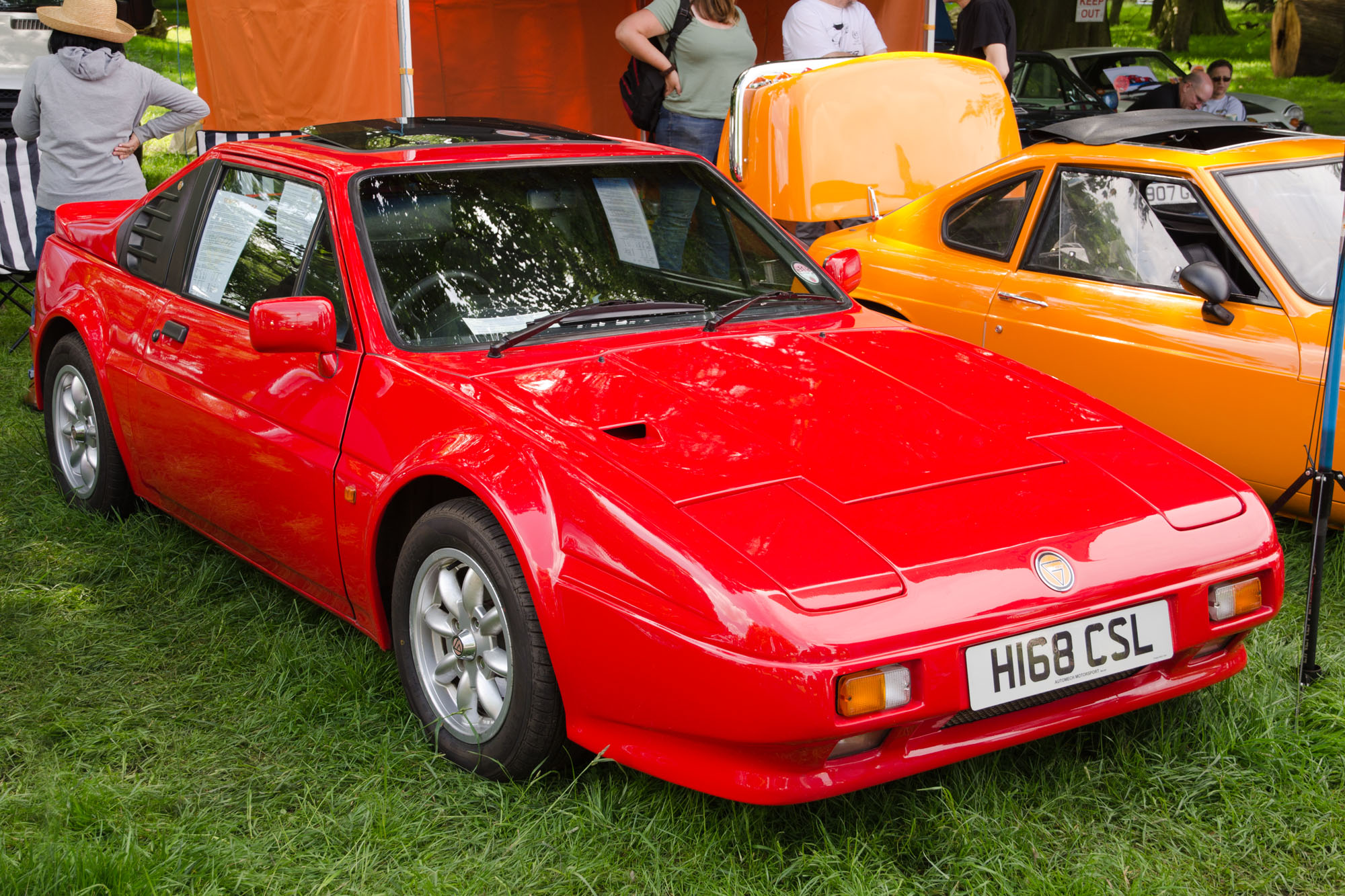
Ginetta G32

It was decided to re-enter the complete car business with the mid-engined G32 with a choice of 1.6- or 1.9-litre four-cylinder engine, available as a coupé or convertible. In 1990, the G32 coupé cost £13,700 (equivalent to £33,879 in 2025), the convertible £14,600 (equivalent to £36,104 in 2025), and the G33 £17,800 (equivalent to £44,018 in 2025). The G32 used a significant amount of parts from the contemporary Ford Fiesta.

=== G50 ===
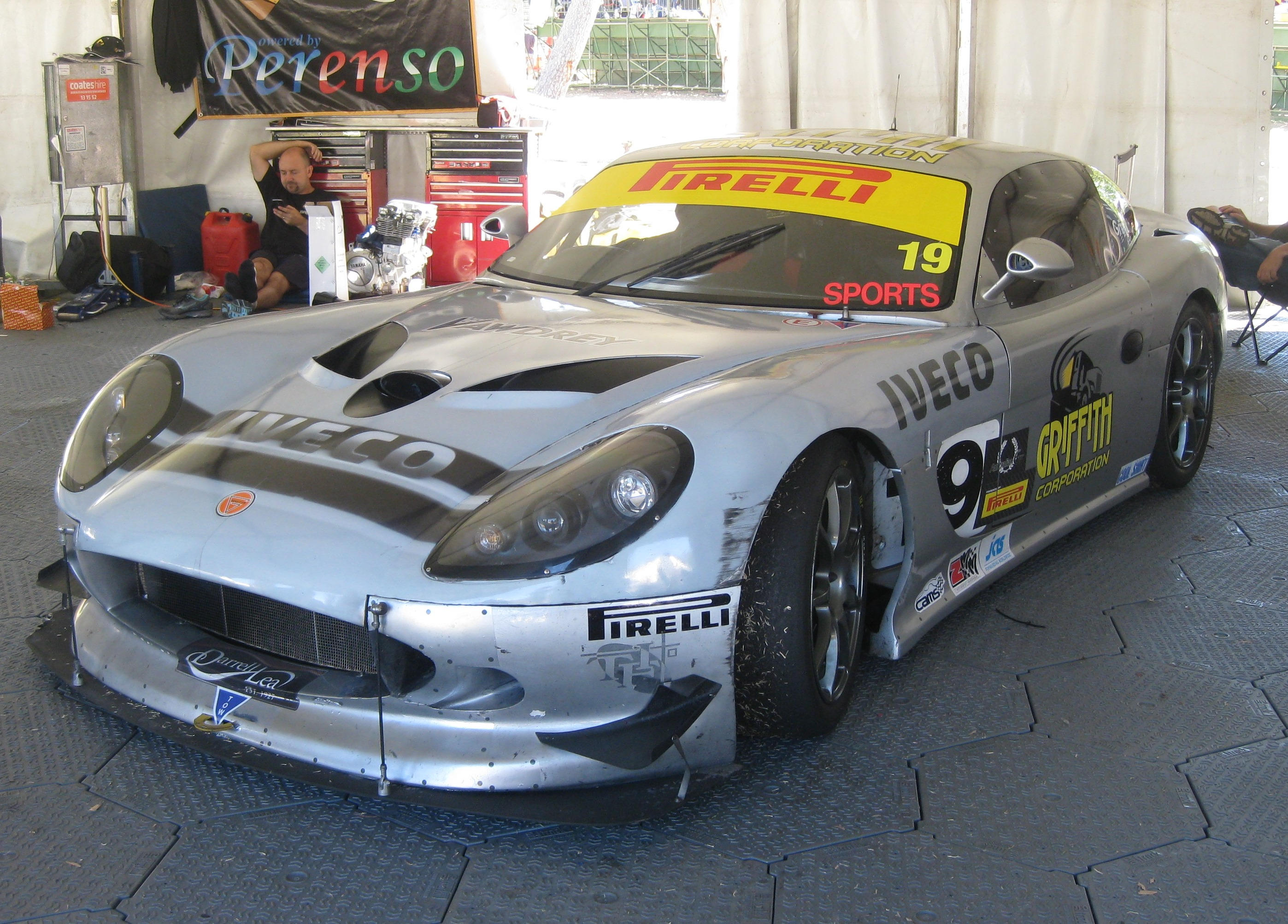
Ginetta G50 GT4

After Ginetta was acquired by Lawrence Tomlinson in 2005, the company began work on the design of the Ginetta G50 - utilizing a 3.5-litre V6 engine, generating a power output of 224 kW (300 hp; 305 PS) - to celebrate the company's 50th anniversary. In 2007, the car competed in its first race in the European GT4 Cup, in Nogaro France, finishing second.

Soon after this success, the car was officially launched at Autosport International in early 2008 alongside its sister car, the Ginetta G50 GT4. Together, they have become Ginetta's best selling cars.

=== G60 ===
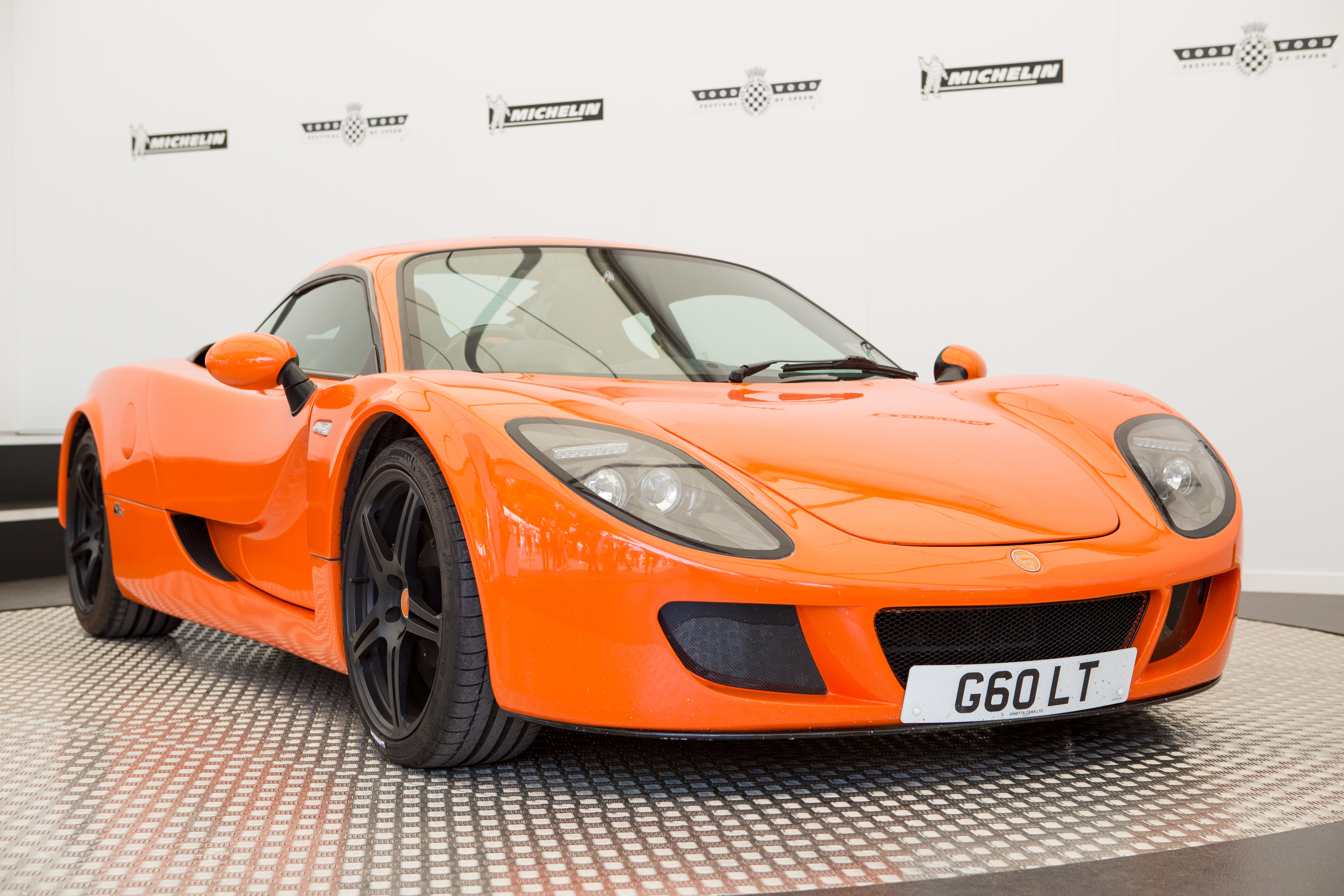
Ginetta G60

In March 2010, Lawrence acquired the Somerset-based sports car manufacturer Farbio Sports Cars, and in doing so inherited the F400, which was subsequently redesigned, redeveloped and rebranded into the Ginetta G60. This is a two-door mid-engined sports car which shares the same 3.7-litre V6 engine as its G55 GT3 stablemate and is capable of 0–97 km/h (0–60 mph) in 4.9 seconds, with a top speed of 266 km/h (165 mph).

=== G40 ===
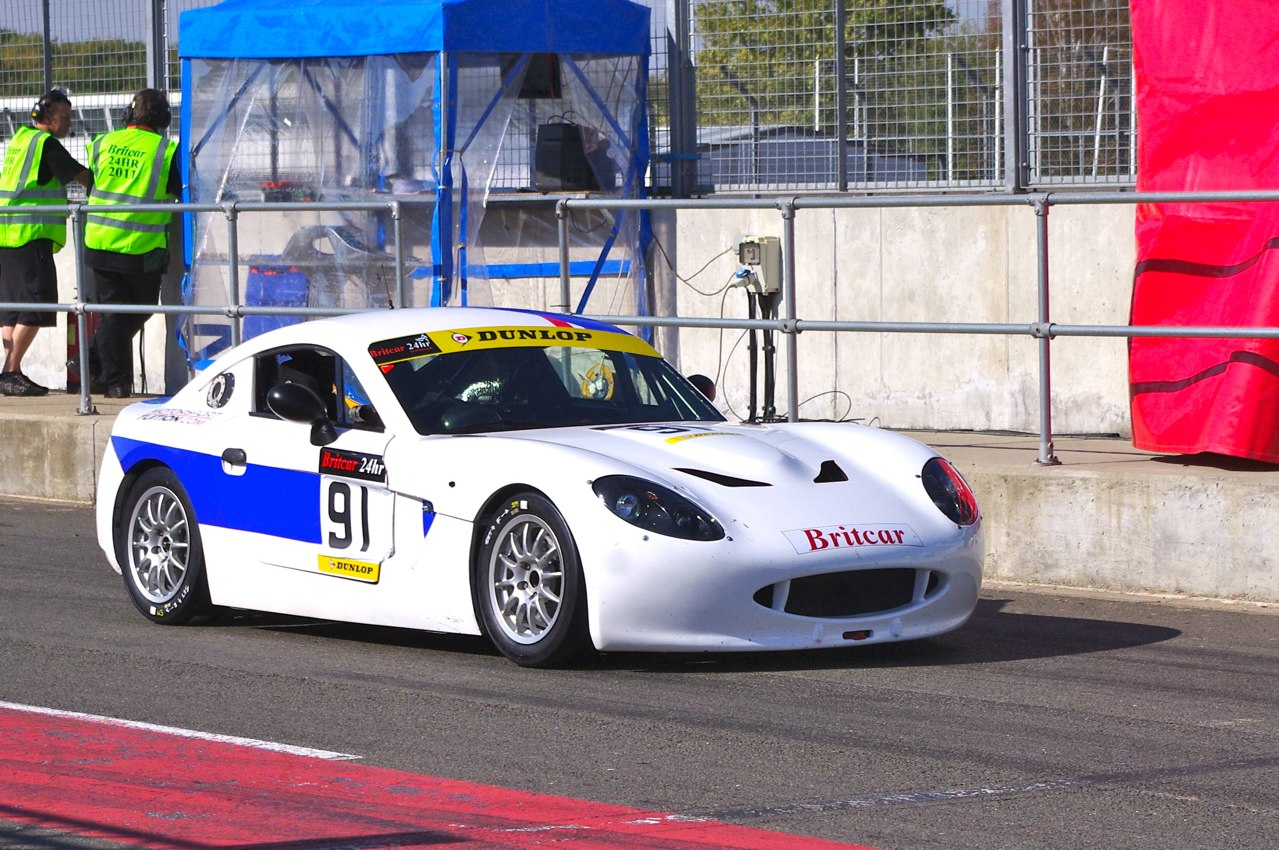
Ginetta G40

In 2010, Lawrence implemented a newer, safer car into the existing Ginetta Junior series and in doing so, replaced the old Ginetta G20 race car with a G40J.

Following the success of the G40J, Ginetta decided to introduce a Ginetta G40 Challenge car for the adult racers in its Challenge series. With the same engine as its sister car, the G40 Challenge car is capable of 123 kW (165 hp) and competes against existing G20 models. Today, the car features heavily in the Total Quartz Ginetta GT5 Challenge.

Ginetta unveiled its second road car, the Ginetta G40R, in 2011. It was designed to mimic the Walklett brothers' original vision of 'a race car for the road'. Capable of 0–97 km/h (0–60 mph) in 5.8 seconds, the G40R shares a number of characteristics with its racing siblings.

=== G55 ===
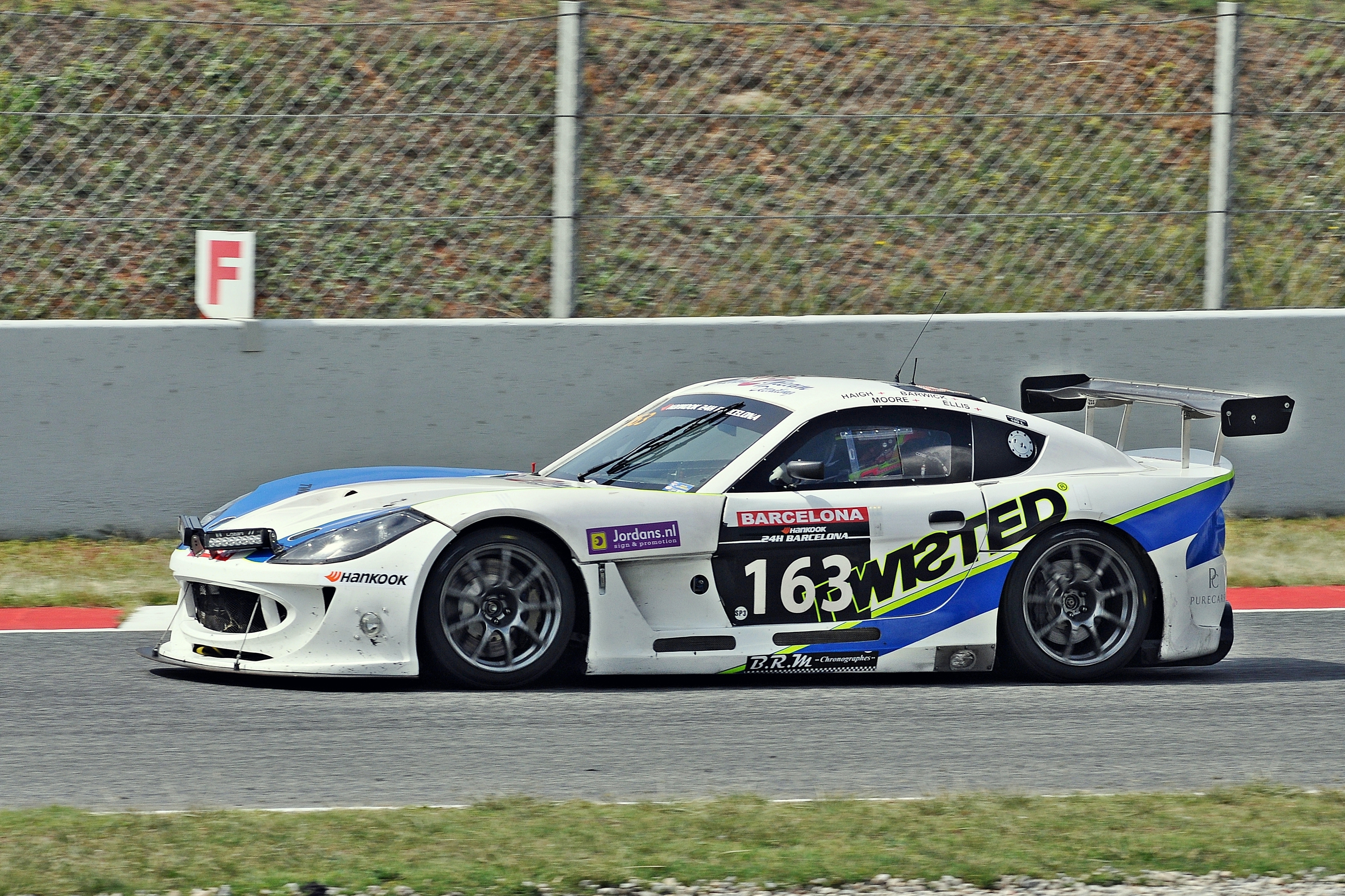
Ginetta G55

2011 saw the introduction of the G55 Cup car to the Ginetta GT Supercup, which, until that point, had only featured the G50 Cup car. Offering a 3.7-liter V6 engine generating a maximum power output of 380 hp (283 kW; 385 PS), the car provided Ginetta with the basis for their Ginetta G55 GT3 car; a larger spec car which gives GT teams a 4.35L V8 powerplant.

=== Akula ===
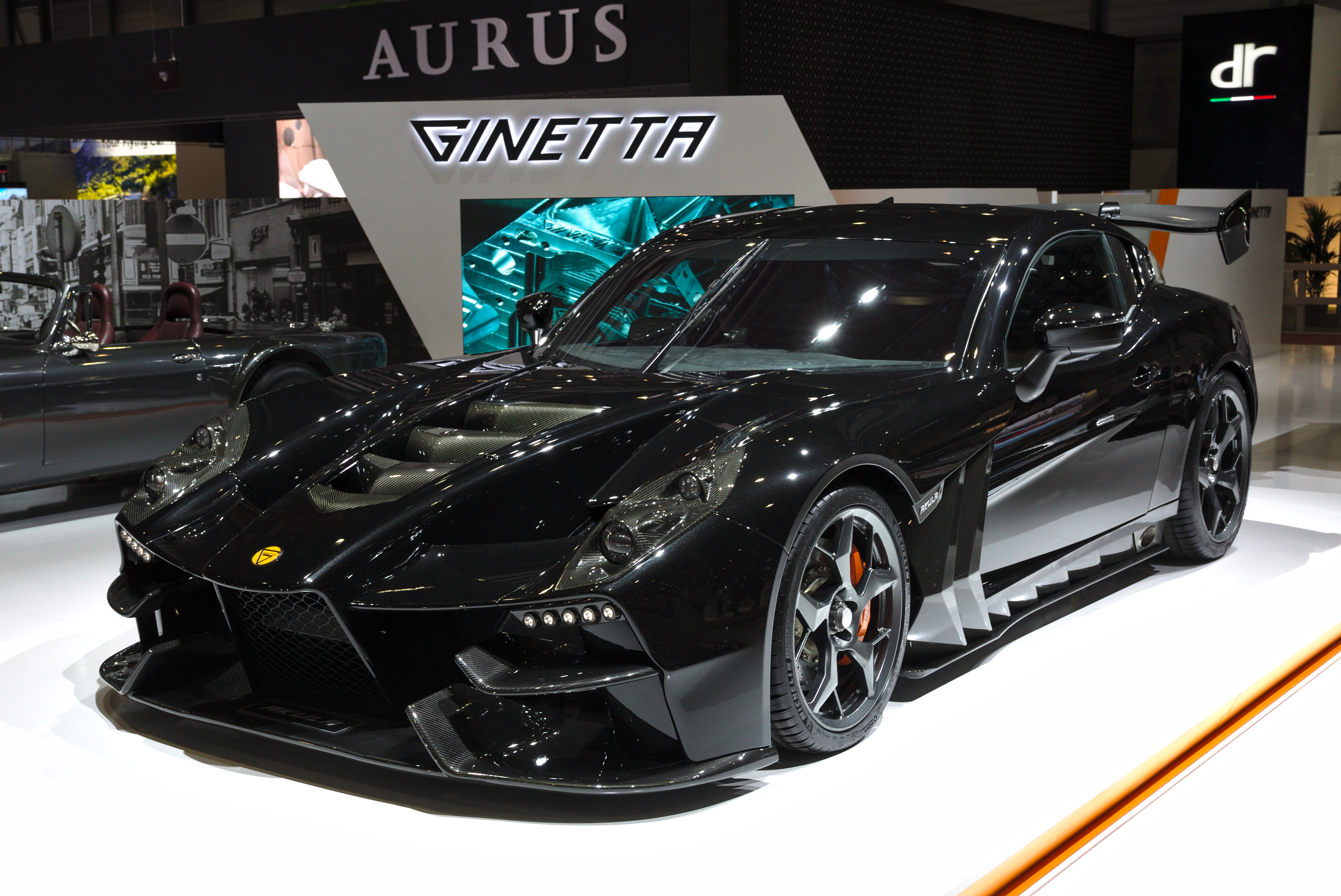
Ginetta Akula

On 5 March 2019, at the Geneva International Motor Show, Ginetta announced a new 6.0-litre Ginetta/Chevrolet LS2 OHV V8 600 hp (447 kW; 608 PS) supercar called the Akula (Акула), Russian for "shark".

== Motorsport ==
=== Michelin Ginetta GT4 SuperCup ===
The Michelin Ginetta GT4 SuperCup is a single-class race series which features the Ginetta G50 and G55 sports cars; running in support of the British Touring Car Championship.

The championship began as the Ginetta G50 Cup in 2008, supporting the British Formula Three Championship and British GT Championship. In 2009, it moved to support the BTCC. In 2011, with the introduction of the Ginetta G55, the championship became the Michelin Ginetta GT4 SuperCup.

The 2014 season will be the fourth running of the Michelin Ginetta GT4 Supercup, but it will be the first year in which the G50 GT4 and G55 GT4 cars are consolidated into one single class. In order to maintain fair competition, the two models will be equalized through a balance of performance test.

=== Protyre Motorsport Ginetta GT5 Challenge ===
The Protyre Motorsport Ginetta GT5 Challenge offers a low-cost opportunity to race in a single-make racing championship, over seven race weekends supporting the British GT package. In 2014, the series returned to Spa for an international round alongside the Swedish Ginetta Challenge series.

A popular entry-level championship for many GT racers, the series boasts packed grids with close racing. All weekends are triple headers, providing 21 races throughout the season, with all races counting towards the final championship positions.

=== Prototype ===
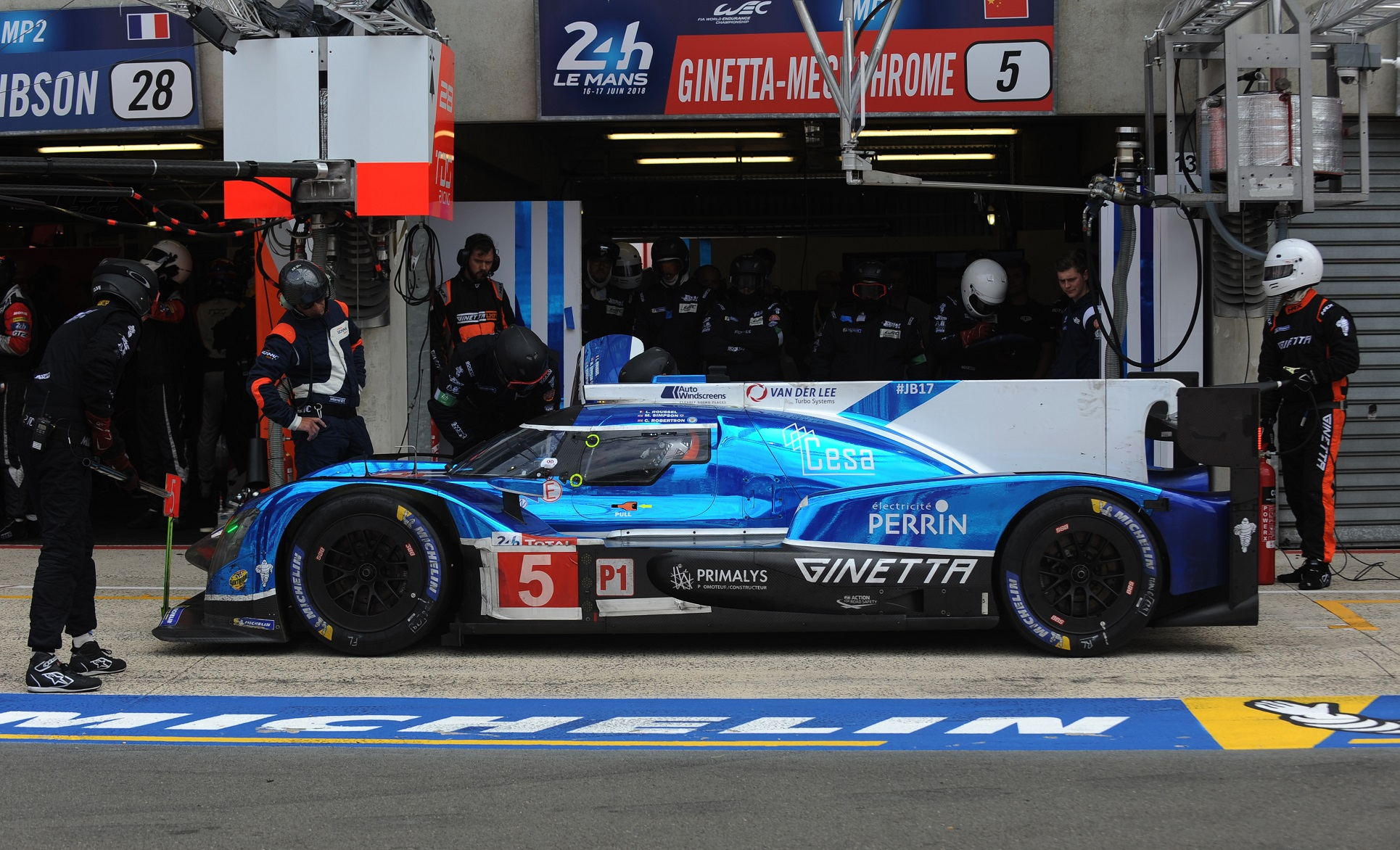
Ginetta G60-LT-P1

Ginetta supplies customer LMP3 cars for the European Le Mans Series and Asian Le Mans Series as well as the IMSA Prototype Challenge.

In 2017, Ginetta developed a LMP1 class car: the Ginetta G60-LT-P1. For the 2018–19 FIA World Endurance Championship season Ginetta entered 2 G60-LT-P1 in the WEC series in conjunction with TRSM Racing Manor. At the 2018 24 Hours of Le Mans, the #5 car finished 5th in class, while the #6 car retired after 10 hours due to persistent electrical issues.

== Racecars ==
Year	Car	Category
2008	Ginetta G50 GT4	SRO GT4
2009	Ginetta-Zytek GZ09S	LMP1
2011	Ginetta G55 GT4	SRO GT4
2015	Ginetta-Juno P3-15	LMP3
2016	Ginetta G57 P2	LMP2
2018	Ginetta G58	LMP2
2018	Ginetta G60-LT-P1	LMP1
2020	Ginetta G61-LT-P3	LMP3
2021	Ginetta G56 GT4	SRO GT4
2025	Ginetta G61-LT-P3 Evo	LMP3
2025	Ginetta G56 GT2	SRO GT2

== See also ==
- List of car manufacturers of the United Kingdom

== Bibliography ==
- Walklett, Bob (1994). Ginetta - The Inside Story: 31 Years of British Specialist Car Manufacturer. Bookmarque Publishing. ISBN 1-870519-28-0.
- Rose, John (1988). Ginetta: The Illustrated History. G T Foulis & Co Ltd. ISBN 0-85429-685-9.
- Pyman, T. (2004). History of the Ginetta G4. Bookmarque Publishing. ISBN 1-870519-69-8.
