= Sam Neary =

British racing driver (born 2002)

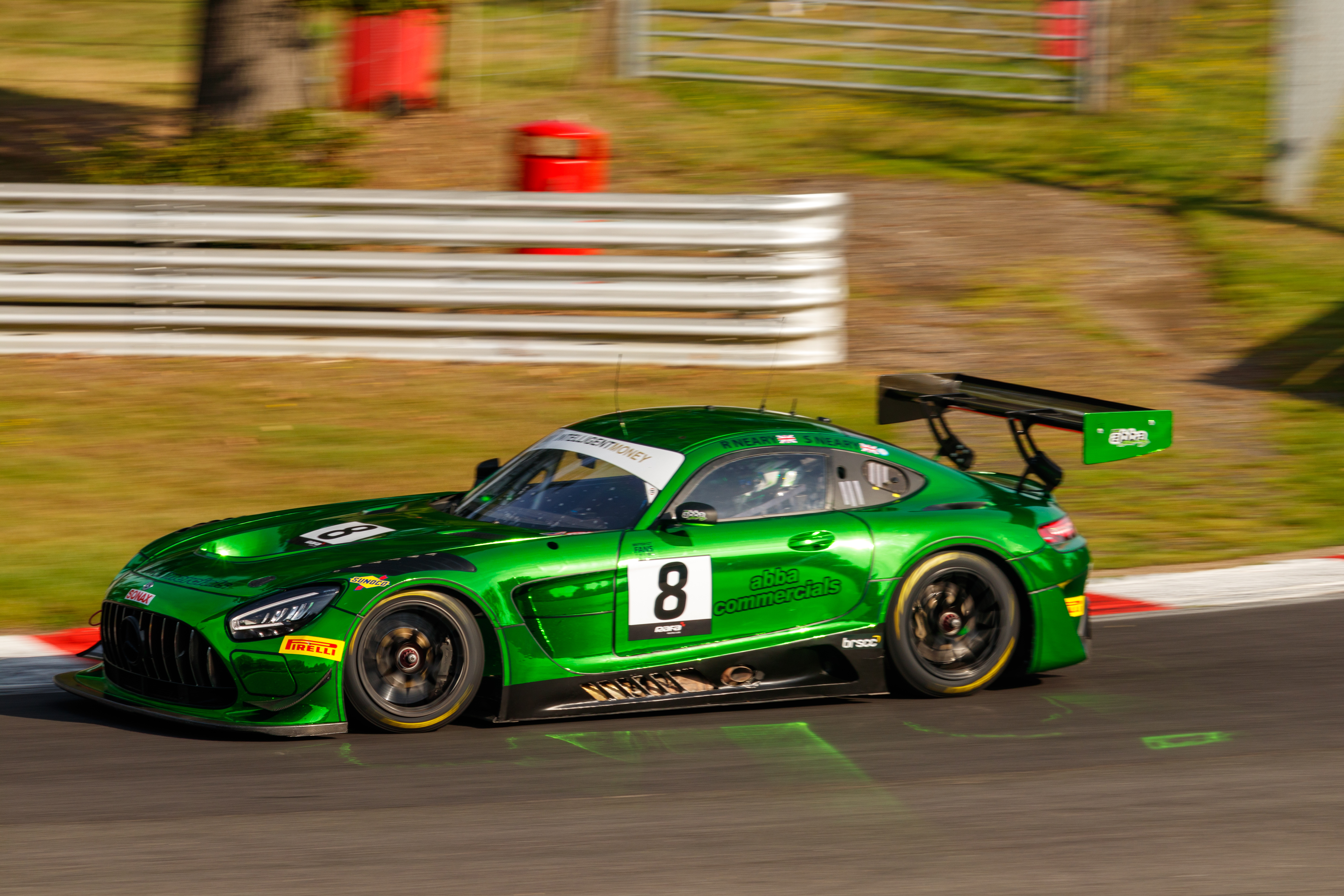
- Neary in 2023
- Nationality: (United Kingdom) British
- Born: 27 April 2002 (age 24) Liverpool, England
- Relatives: Richard Neary (father)
- Categorisation: FIA Silver (until 2024); FIA Gold (2025–)

Championship titles
- 2021: GT Cup Championship – GT3
Medal record
GT3
Representing United Kingdom
FIA Motorsport Games
Bronze medal – third place	2022 Le Castellet	GT Cup

Sam Neary (born 27 April 2002) is a British racing driver who last competed in the British GT Championship for Team Abba Racing.

== Personal life ==
Neary is the son of Team ABBA Racing founder Richard Neary, who he has driven with in the British GT Championship since his debut in 2020.

== Career ==
Neary made his car racing debut in late 2017, racing in the Ginetta Junior Winter Series for TCR. After finishing third in the SP3 class at the 2018 12 Hours of Spa-Francorchamps for Team ABBA, Neary returned to his family's team to compete in the 2019 Britcar Endurance Championship. Racing primarily in the Class 4, Neary scored three wins in the six races he contested to end the season fifth in points. During 2019, Neary also won the 12 Hours of Brno in the SP3 class for the same team.

In 2020, Neary continued with the family team to make his debut in the British GT Championship alongside his father, driving a Mercedes-AMG GT3. In his first season in the series, Neary scored a best outright result of sixth at Donington Park and three Pro-Am podiums to end the year fifth in points. Returning to the series for the following year, the father-son duo became the first in series history to win a race, doing so at the first Donington Park enduro. Across the rest of the season, Neary scored Silver-Am wins at Brands Hatch and the second Donington Park, with the latter also being an overall podium, to secure runner-up honors in class. During 2021, Neary also raced with the same team in the GT Cup Championship, in which he won both the GT3 and overall titles.

Continuing with the team for a third season in the British GT Championship, Neary scored a best overall result of third at Snetterton, which was also a Silver-Am win, as well as another class win at Oulton Park to round out the year fifth in points. During 2022, Neary also made select appearances in the Nürburgring Langstrecken-Serie for various teams, as well as racing in the Dubai 24 Hour for Holmgaard Motorsport in the TCR class. Towards the end of the year, Neary was also drafted in as a last-minute substitute for Chris Froggatt at the FIA Motorsport Games GT Cup, in which he finished third for Team UK.

Remaining with Team Abba for 2023, Neary clinched four Silver-Am podiums and a best result of fifth four rounds into the season at Snetterton, in the team's first race with the AMG GT3 Evo spec. In parallel, Neary joined Lamborghini-linked GRT Grasser Racing Team to race in the GT World Challenge Europe Endurance Cup, scoring a Silver Cup win at Barcelona and a further class podium at Monza to finish sixth in points.

The following year, Neary stayed with Team Abba for their first full season with the AMG GT3 Evo, securing two Silver-Am class wins and a best overall result of second at Silverstone en route to runner-up honors in the class standings. During 2024, Neary also raced at the 24 Hours of Spa for McLaren-fielding Optimum Motorsport. After being upgraded to an FIA Gold Categorisation, Neary only returned to the British GT Championship with Team Abba the following year, taking a best result of fourth at Oulton Park and a Pro-Am podium at the first Donington Park enduro.

== Racing record ==
=== Racing career summary ===
Season	Series	Team	Races	Wins	Poles	F/Laps	Podiums	Points	Position
2017	Ginetta Junior Winter Series	TCR	4	0	0	0	0	32	13th
2018	24H TCE Series – SP3	Team ABBA with Rollcentre Racing	1	0	0	0	1	17	NC
2019	Britcar Endurance Championship – Class 4	Team Abba Racing	6	3	2	5	3	97‡	5th‡
2019	Britcar Endurance Championship – Class 1	Team Abba Racing	2	2	1	2	2	0	NC†
2019	Britcar Endurance Championship – Class 3	Team Abba Racing	1	0	1	0	0	0	NC†
2019	24H TCE Series Europe – SP3	Team Abba Racing	1	1	0	0	1	18	NC
2020	British GT Championship – GT3	Team Abba Racing	7	0	0	0	0	34	11th
2020	GT Cup Championship – GT3	Team Abba Racing	4	2	2	2	4	0	NC†
2020	GT Cup Championship – GT3	Tecserv UK	1	1	1	0	1	72‡	**2nd‡**
2021	British GT Championship – GT3	Team Abba Racing	7	1	0	0	2	75	8th
2021	GT Cup Championship – GT3	Team Abba Racing							**1st**
2022	24H TCE Series Continents – TCR	Holmgaard Motorsport	1	0	0	0	0	17	NC
2022	British GT Championship – GT3	Team Abba Racing	8	0	1	0	1	31	19th
2022	GT Cup Championship – GT3	Team Abba Racing	4	0	0	0	1		
2022	GT Cup Championship – GTH	Team Abba Racing	4	0	0	0	0		
2022	FIA Motorsport Games GT Cup	Team United Kingdom	1	0	0	0	1	—N/a	**3rd**
2022	Nürburgring Langstrecken-Serie – BMW M2 CS	Walkenhorst Motorsport	1	0	0	0	0	0	NC
2022	Nürburgring Langstrecken-Serie – BMW M240i	Adrenalin Motorsport Team Alzner Automotive	1	0	0	0	0	0	NC
2022	Nürburgring Langstrecken-Serie – BMW M240i	Schnitzelalm Racing	1	0	0	0	0	0	NC
2022	Nürburgring Langstrecken-Serie – VT2 R+4	Team Sorg Rennsport	1	0	0	0	0	0	NC
2023	British GT Championship – GT3	Team Abba Racing	8	0	1	0	0	10	23rd
2023	GT World Challenge Europe Endurance Cup	GRT Grasser Racing Team	5	0	0	0	0	0	NC
2023	GT World Challenge Europe Endurance Cup – Silver	GRT Grasser Racing Team	5	1	1	1	2	53	6th
2023	GT Cup Championship – GTC	Topcats Racing	4	4	2	2	4	432‡	**1st‡**
2024	British GT Championship – GT3	Team Abba Racing	9	0	0	0	3	74.5	8th
2024	GT World Challenge Europe Endurance Cup	Optimum Motorsport	1	0	0	0	0	0	NC
2024	GT World Challenge Europe Endurance Cup – Bronze	Optimum Motorsport	1	0	0	0	0	4	36th
2025	British GT Championship – GT3	Team Abba Racing	6	0	0	0	0	42	12th

^{†} As Neary was a guest driver, he was ineligible to score points.

^{‡} Team standings.

=== Complete British GT Championship results ===
(key) (Races in bold indicate pole position) (Races in italics indicate fastest lap)

Year	Team	Car	Class	1	2	3	4	5	6	7	8	9	DC	Points
2020	Team ABBA Racing	Mercedes-AMG GT3	GT3 Pro-Am	OUL; 1; 8	OUL; 2 Ret	DON1; 1; 6	DON1; 2; 20	BRH; 7	DON2; 8	SNE; 1 DNS	SNE; 2 DNS	SIL; 11	5th	106.5
2021	Team ABBA Racing	Mercedes-AMG GT3	GT3 Silver-Am	BRH; 5	SIL; Ret	DON1; 1	SPA; Ret	SNE; 1	SNE; 2	OUL; 1 DSQ	OUL; 2 DSQ	DON2; 3	2nd	75
2022	Team ABBA Racing	Mercedes-AMG GT3	GT3 Silver-Am	OUL; 1; 13	OUL; 2; 4	SIL; DSQ	DON1; 13	SNE; 1; 3	SNE; 2; 11	SPA	BRH; 9	DON2; Ret	5th	119
2023	Team Abba Racing	Mercedes-AMG GT3	GT3 Silver-Am	OUL; 1 Ret	**OUL**; **2**; 13	SIL; 13	DON1; Ret						5th	91.5
2023	Team Abba Racing	Mercedes-AMG GT3 Evo	GT3 Silver-Am					SNE; 1; 5	SNE; 2; 14	ALG	BRH; Ret	DON2; 14	5th	91.5
2024	Team Abba Racing	Mercedes-AMG GT3 Evo	GT3 Silver-Am	OUL; 1; 11	OUL; 2; 8	SIL; 2	DON1; 13	SPA; Ret	SNE; 1; 3	SNE; 2; 7	DON2; DSQ	BRH; 4	2nd	158.5
2025	Team Abba Racing	Mercedes-AMG GT3 Evo	GT3 Pro-Am	DON1; 5	SIL; 10	OUL; 1; 4	OUL; 2 Ret	SPA; Ret	SNE; 1	SNE; 2	BRH	DON2; 9	12th	45

=== Complete GT World Challenge Europe results ===
==== GT World Challenge Europe Endurance Cup ====
Year	Team	Car	Class	1	2	3	4	5	6	7	Pos.	Points
2023	GRT Grasser Racing Team	Lamborghini Huracán GT3 Evo 2	Silver	MNZ; 27	LEC; Ret	**SPA**; **6H**; 28	**SPA**; **12H**; 62†	**SPA**; **24H**; Ret	NÜR; 47	CAT; 16	6th	53
2024	Optimum Motorsport	McLaren 720S GT3 Evo	Bronze	LEC	SPA; 6H; 45	SPA; 12H; 39	SPA; 24H; 23	NÜR	MNZ	JED	36th	4
