= Marcus Clutton =

British racing driver (born 1989)

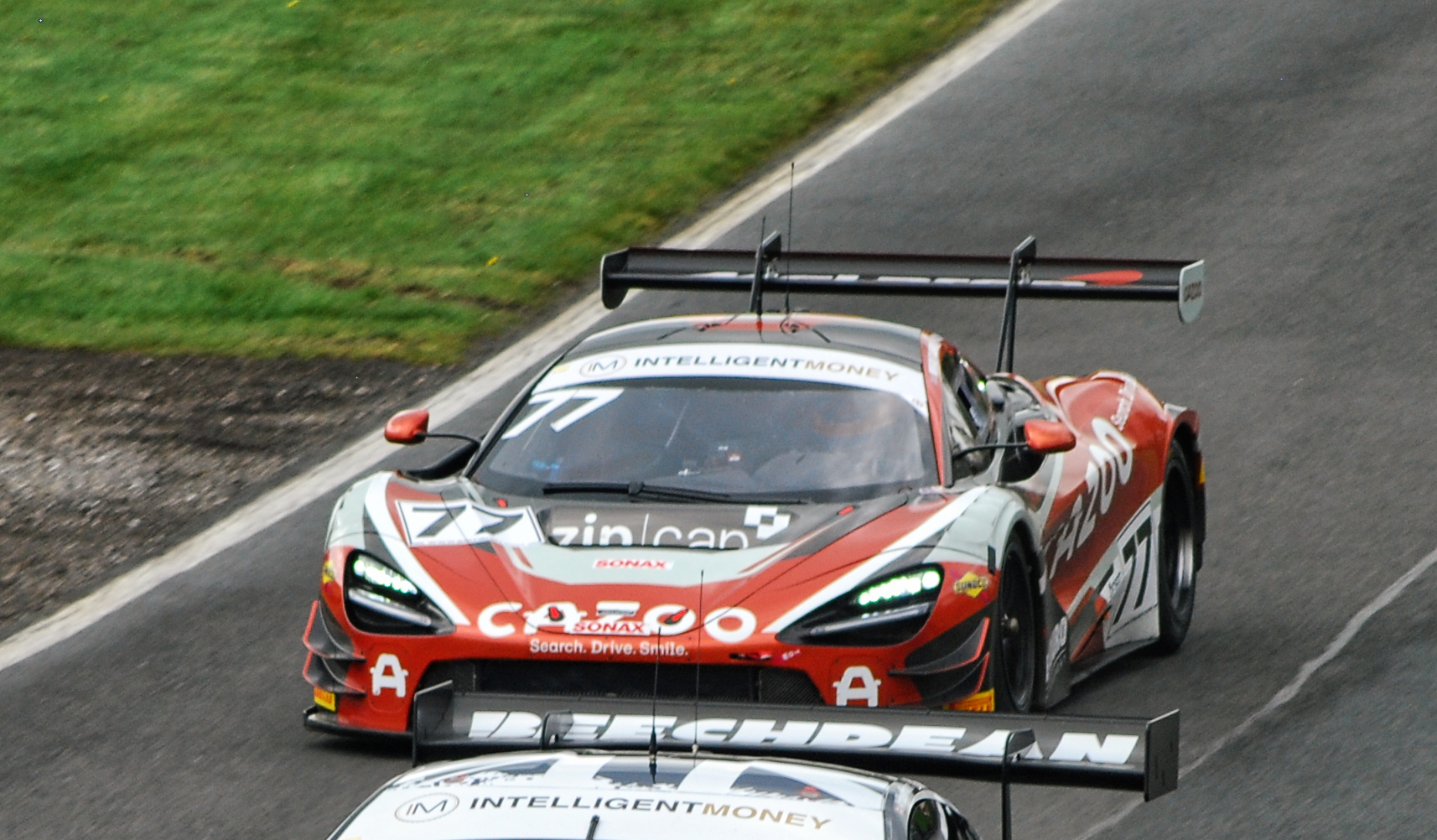
- Clutton in 2023
- Nationality: (United Kingdom) British
- Born: 3 May 1989 (age 37) Oldham, England
- Categorisation: FIA Silver (until 2022); FIA Gold (2023–)

Championship titles
- 2026 2026 2024 2020 2020 2011 2009: British GT – GT3; British GT – GT3 Pro-Am; British Endurance Championship – Class A GT Cup Championship – GT3; Radical Challenge Championship – Solo Challenge; British GT – GT4; British GT – Supersport

Marcus Anthony Clutton (born 3 March 1989) is a British racing driver who last competed for Orange Racing powered by JMH in the British GT Championship.

== Career ==
Clutton made his car racing debut in 2005, competing in the Porsche Club Championship. After appearances in Britcar and the BARC Formula Renault championship over the following two years, Clutton raced in select rounds of the 2009 British GT Championship for ABG Motorsport in the Supersport class, which he won after winning all three races he entered. Two years later, Clutton returned to the series and ABG to compete in the GT4 class, scoring three wins and four other podiums to seal the class title at season's end.

Following that, Clutton spent the next three seasons dabbling in the British Endurance Championship and the GT Cup Championship, before joining Chevron Cars to race in all but one round of the GT4 European Series. In his only season in the series, Clutton scored an outright win at Misano to take seventh in the Pro standings. Part-time appearances in the Britcar Endurance and British GT Championships then followed in 2017 and 2018, before primarily racing in the Radical Challenge Championship across the next two seasons, in which he took the Solo Challenge title in 2020. During 2020, Clutton also won the GT Cup Championship GT3 title for JMH Automotive, as well as making a one-off return to the British GT Championship for the same team in a Lamborghini Huracán GT3 Evo.

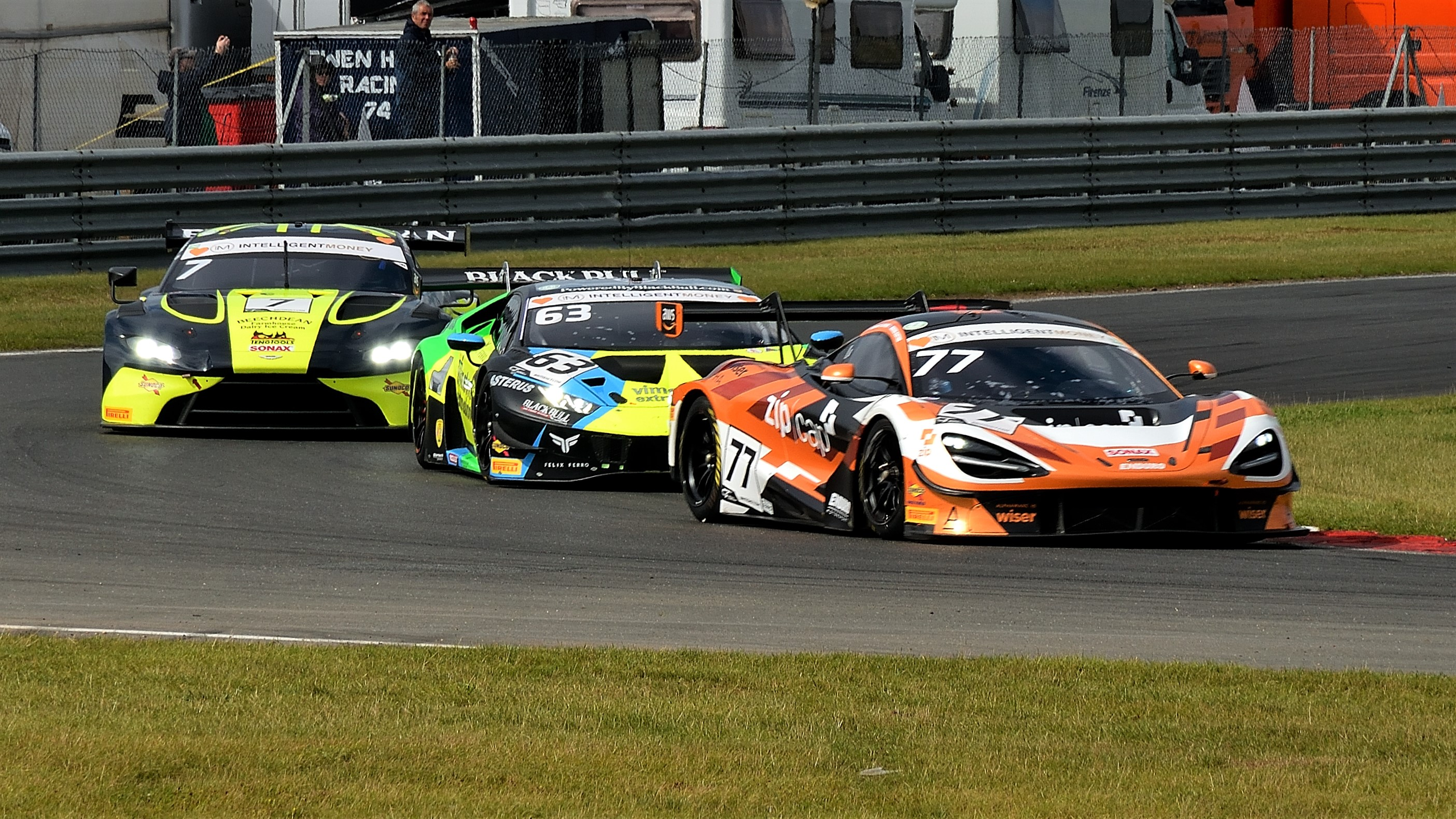
Clutton's McLaren leading a train of British GT cars at Snetterton in 2021.

In 2021, Clutton joined McLaren customer team Enduro Motorsport to partner Morgan Tillbrook on a full-time basis in the British GT Championship, in which he scored his first overall win at the season-ending Donington Park enduro en route to an eighth-place points finish in the Pro-Am points. Remaining with Enduro for 2022, Clutton took outright wins at Donington Park and Brands Hatch on his way to a third-place points finish in the overall and Pro-Am standings. During 2022, Clutton also raced in the GT3 class of the GT Cup Championship for the same team, taking seven wins and 11 podiums to secure runner-up honors.

At the start of the following year, Clutton and Tillbrook joined fellow McLaren customer team Orange Racing powered by JMH to race in the GT class of the Asian Le Mans Series, before returning to Enduro Motorsport to race in British GT for the rest of the year. In his third consecutive season with the team, Clutton scored outright podiums at Oulton Park and Donington Park to end the season 11th in Pro-Am. In 2024, Clutton joined McLaren-affiliated Garage 59 to continue in the British GT Championship, in which he scored a best outright result of third at Brands Hatch and a Pro-Am win at Silverstone en route to fifth in points. During 2024, Clutton also competed for PB Racing by JMH in select rounds of the British Endurance Championship, winning all five races he contested as he helped the team secure the Class A title.

Remaining with McLaren machinery for 2025, Clutton returned to Orange Racing powered by JMH to partner Simon Orange in the final two rounds of the GT Winter Series and the full British GT season. In the former, Clutton scored a lone win at Aragón, whereas in the latter, Clutton scored a lone podium at Oulton Park to take ninth in the GT3 Pro-Am standings. The following year, Clutton remained with Orange Racing powered by JMH for a dual campaign in the GT Winter Series and the British GT Championship. In the former, Clutton scored wins at Valencia and Aragón en route to runner-up honors in GT3. In the latter, Clutton took the pole at Spa and three outright podiums to enter the Brands Hatch, before winning the Brands Hatch finale to jump to secure the overall and GT3 Pro-Am titles with Orange.

== Racing record ==
=== Racing career summary ===
Season	Series	Team	Races	Wins	Poles	F/Laps	Podiums	Points	Position
2005	Porsche Club Championship								
2006	Britcar								
2007	BARC Formula Renault								
2009	British GT Championship – Supersport	ABG Motorsport	3	3	2	1	3	15	**1st**
2011	British GT Championship – GT4	ABG Motorsport	10	3	1	3	7	205.5	**1st**
2015	GT4 European Series – Pro	Chevron Cars	8	1	1	2	1	78	7th
2015	GT Cup UK – GTO	Chevron Racing	1	0	0	0	0	49	11th
2017	Britcar Endurance Championship – Class 3 Sprint	Track Focused	2	0	0	0	2	249‡	**1st‡**
2018	British GT Championship – GTC	JMH Auto	1	1	1	1	1	0	NC†
2019	Britcar Endurance Championship – Class 1	JMH Automotive	2	1	1	2	2	58‡	6th‡
2019	Radical Challenge Championship – Solo Challenge	Valour Racing	11	3	0	5	6	465	7th
2019	Britcar Endurance Championship – Class 4	Forelle Estates	2	2	1	2	2	143‡	4th‡
2020	Radical Challenge Championship – Solo Challenge	Valour Racing	12	9	3	6	12	794	**1st**
2020	British GT Championship – GT3 Pro-Am	JMH Automotive	2	0	0	0	1	27	10th
2020	GT Cup Championship – GT3	JMH Automotive	11	8	1	7	9	141‡	**1st‡**
2020	GT Cup Championship – GTO	JMH Automotive	2	2	1	2	2	0	NC†
2020	GT Cup Championship – GTH	Enduro Motorsport	4	0	0	2	0	0	NC†
2021	British GT Championship – GT3 Pro-Am	Enduro Motorsport	8	1	0	0	2	22.5	8th
2021	GT Cup Championship – GTH	Enduro Motorsport	12	0	0	0	4	155	9th
2022	British GT Championship – GT3 Pro-Am	Enduro Motorsport	9	2	0	0	4	141.5	**3rd**
2022	GT Cup Championship – GT3	Enduro Motorsport	20	7	4	0	18	430	**2nd‡**
2022	British Endurance Championship – Class C	PB Racing	4	2	3	4	4	118‡	**3rd‡**
2023	Asian Le Mans Series – GT	Orange Racing powered by JMH	2	0	0	0	0	0	24th
2023	British GT Championship – GT3 Pro-Am	Enduro Motorsport	8	0	0	0	2	63	11th
2023	British Endurance Championship – Class A	PB Racing						129‡	**1st‡**
2023	GT Cup Championship – GT3	Enduro Motorsport	12	1	0	1	5	0	NC†
2023	GT Cup Championship – GT3	Orange Racing powered by JMH	4	0	0	0	0	0	NC†
2024	British GT Championship – GT3 Pro-Am	Garage 59	7	1	0	0	2	99.5	5th
2024	British Endurance Championship – Class A	PB Racing by JMH	5	5	?	?	5	129‡	**1st‡**
2025	GT Winter Series – GT3	Orange Racing powered by JMH	6	1	0	?	2	88	6th
2025	British GT Championship – GT3 Pro-Am	Orange Racing powered by JMH	9	0	0	0	1	70	9th
2026	GT Winter Series – GT3	Orange Racing powered by JMH	15	2	?	?	8	222	**2nd**
2026	British GT Championship – GT3	Orange Racing powered by JMH	8	1	1	0	4	138.5	**1st**

^{†} As Clutton was a guest driver, he was ineligible to score points.

^{‡} Team standings.

=== Complete British GT Championship results ===
(key) (Races in bold indicate pole position) (Races in italics indicate fastest lap)

Year	Team	Car	Class	1	2	3	4	5	6	7	8	9	10	11	12	13	14	Pos	Points
2009	ABG Motorsport	KTM X-Bow	Supersport	**OUL**; **1**; 10	OUL; 2; 13	SPA; 1	SPA; 2	ROC; 1	ROC; 2	KNO; 1	KNO; 2	SNE; 1	SNE; 2	**DON**; 8	SIL	BRH; 1	BRH; 2	1st	15
2011	ABG Motorsport	KTM X-Bow GT4	GT4	OUL; 1; 16	OUL; 2 Ret	SNE; 9	**BRH**; 11	SPA; 1; 17	SPA; 2; 12	ROC; 1; 19	ROC; 2; 12	DON; 15	SIL; 18					1st	205.5
2018	JMH Auto	Ferrari 488 Challenge	GTC	OUL; 1	OUL; 2	ROC	SNE; 1	SNE; 2	SIL	SPA	BRH	DON; 12						NC†	0†
2020	JMH Automotive	Lamborghini Huracán GT3 Evo	GT3 Pro-Am	OUL; 1; 13	OUL; 2; 7	DON1; 1	DON1; 2	BRH	DON2	SNE; 1	SNE; 2	SIL						10th	24
2021	Enduro Motorsport	McLaren 720S GT3	GT3 Pro-Am	BRH; Ret	SIL; Ret	DON1; 4	SPA	SNE; 1 DSQ	SNE; 2; 18	OUL; 1; 10	OUL; 2; 6	DON2; 1						8th	22.5
2022	Enduro Motorsport	McLaren 720S GT3	GT3 Pro-Am	OUL; 1; 8	OUL; 2; 20	SIL; DSQ	DON1; 1	SNE; 1; 5	SNE; 2; 5	SPA; 26	BRH; 1	DON2; 3						3rd	141.5
2023	Enduro Motorsport	McLaren 720S GT3 Evo	GT3 Pro-Am	OUL; 1; 3	OUL; 2 Ret	SIL; 14	DON1; 23	SNE; 1; 10	SNE; 2; 7		BRH	DON2; 3						11th	63
2023	Enduro Motorsport	Aston Martin Vantage AMR GT3	GT3 Pro-Am							ALG; 11								11th	63
2024	Garage 59	McLaren 720S GT3 Evo	GT3 Pro-Am	OUL; 1; 7	OUL; 2; 28	SIL; 4	DON1; 4	SPA; 9	SNE; 1 WD	SNE; 2 WD	DON2; Ret	BRH; 3						5th	99.5
2025	Orange Racing powered by JMH	McLaren 720S GT3 Evo	GT3 Pro-Am	DON1; 7	SIL; 5	OUL; 1; 12	OUL; 2; 2	SPA; 18	SNE; 1; 10	SNE; 2; 7	BRH; 6	DON2; 8						9th	70
2026	Orange Racing powered by JMH	McLaren 720S GT3 Evo	GT3	SIL; 4	OUL; 1; 12	OUL; 2; 9	**SPA**; 2	SNE; 1; 3	SNE; 2; 2	DON; 6	BRH; 1							1st	138.5

=== Complete GT4 European Series results ===
(key) (Races in bold indicate pole position) (Races in italics indicate fastest lap)

Year	Team	Car	Class	1	2	3	4	5	6	7	8	9	10	11	12	DC	Pts
2015	Chevron Cars	Chevron GT4	Pro	NOG; 1	NOG; 2	ZAN; 1; 5	ZAN; 2; 8	RBR; 1 WD	RBR; 2 WD	SPA; 1; 6	SPA; 2; 7	NÜR; 1; 4	NÜR; 2; 6	**MIS**; **1**; 1	MIS; 2; 6	7th	78

=== Complete Asian Le Mans Series results ===
(key) (Races in bold indicate pole position) (Races in italics indicate fastest lap)

Year	Team	Class	Car	Engine	1	2	3	4	Pos.	Points
2023	Orange Racing powered by JMH	GT	McLaren 720S GT3	McLaren M840T 4.0 L Turbo V8	DUB; 1; 16	DUB; 2; 18	ABU; 1 DNS	ABU; 2 WD	24th	0
