= Ollie Brown (racing driver) =

British racing driver (born 1983)

- Nationality: (United Kingdom) British
- Born: 1983 (age 42–43)

British Touring Car Championship career
- Debut season: 2020
- Current team: RCIB Insurance with Fox Transport
- Car number: 34
- Starts: 9
- Wins: 0
- Poles: 0
- Fastest laps: 0
- Best finish: 24th in 2020

Ollie Brown (born 1983) is a British racing driver currently competing in the British Touring Car Championship. He debuted in 2020 with RCIB Insurance with Fox Transport after briefly racing in the Volkswagen Racing Cup. He is also competing in the GT Cup Championship.

== Racing record ==
=== Complete GT Cup Championship results ===
(key) (Races in bold indicate pole position in class – 1 point awarded just in first race; races in italics indicate fastest lap in class – 1 point awarded all races;-

Year	Team	Car	Class	1	2	3	4	5	6	7	8	9	10	11	12	13	14	15	16	17	18	19	20	DC	CP	Points
2020	Team HARD. Racing	Ginetta G55 Supercup	GTA	SNE; 1; 8	SNE; 2; 18	SNE; 3; 15	SNE; 4; 4	SIL; 1	SIL; 2	SIL; 3	SIL; 4	DON1; 1	DON1; 2	DON1; 3	DON1; 4	BRH; 1	BRH; 2	BRH; 3	BRH; 4	DON2; 1	DON2; 2	DON2; 3	DON2; 4	11th	4th	235

=== Complete British Touring Car Championship results ===
(key) (Races in bold indicate pole position – 1 point awarded just in first race) (Races in italics indicate fastest lap – 1 point awarded all races) (* signifies that driver lead race for at least one lap – 1 point given all races)

Year	Team	Car	1	2	3	4	5	6	7	8	9	10	11	12	13	14	15	16	17	18	19	20	21	22	23	24	25	26	27	Pos	Pts
2020	RCIB Insurance with Fox Transport	Volkswagen CC	DON; 1; 21	DON; 2 Ret	DON; 3; 22	BRH; 1; 20	BRH; 2; 20	BRH; 3; 13	OUL; 1; 22	OUL; 2; 22	OUL; 3 Ret	KNO; 1	KNO; 2	KNO; 3	THR; 1	THR; 2	THR; 3	SIL; 1	SIL; 2	SIL; 3	CRO; 1	CRO; 2	CRO; 3	SNE; 1	SNE; 2	SNE; 3	BRH; 1	BRH; 2	BRH; 3	24th	3
