= 2020 GT Cup Championship =

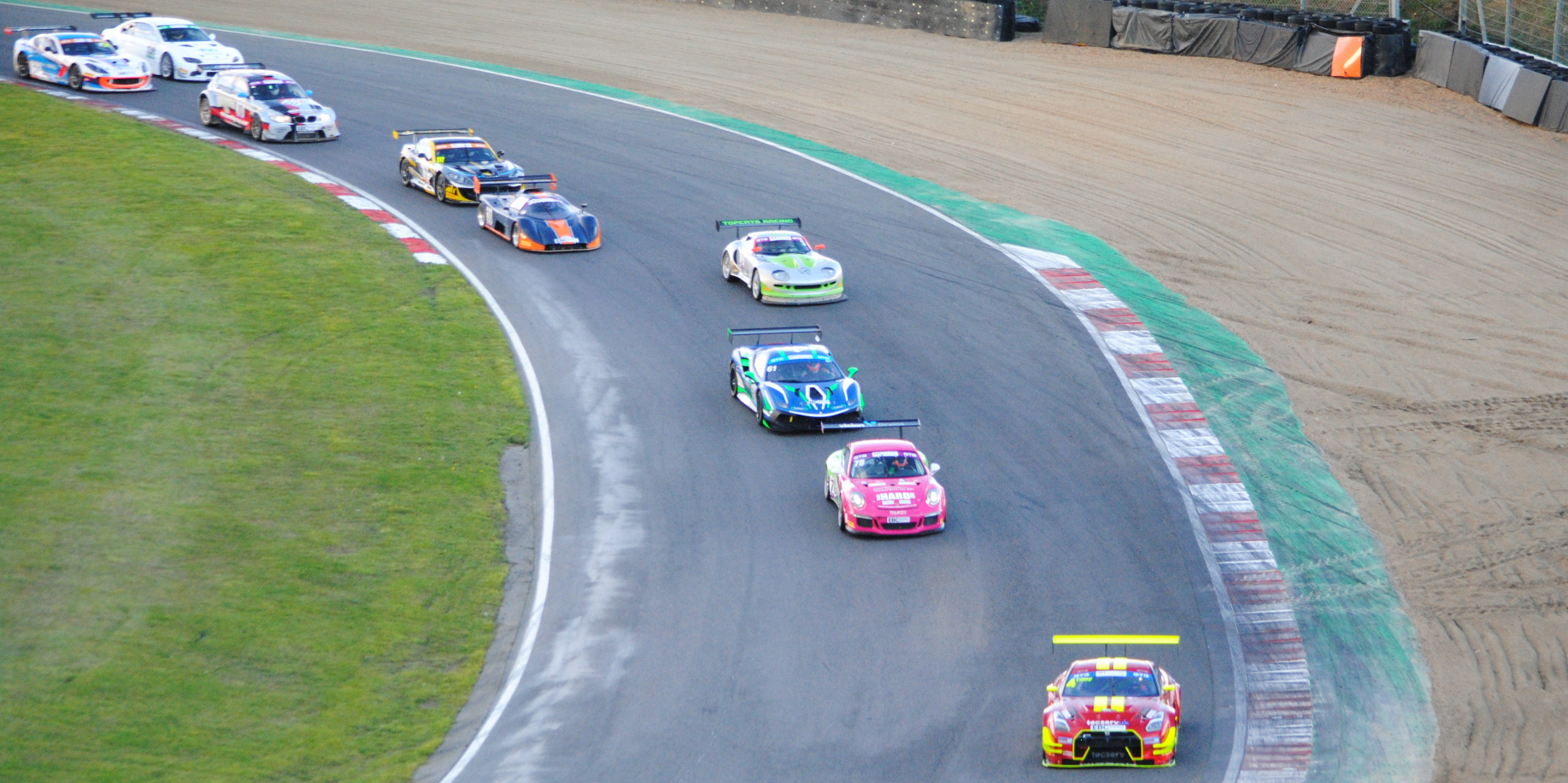
The start of the fourth race at Brands Hatch

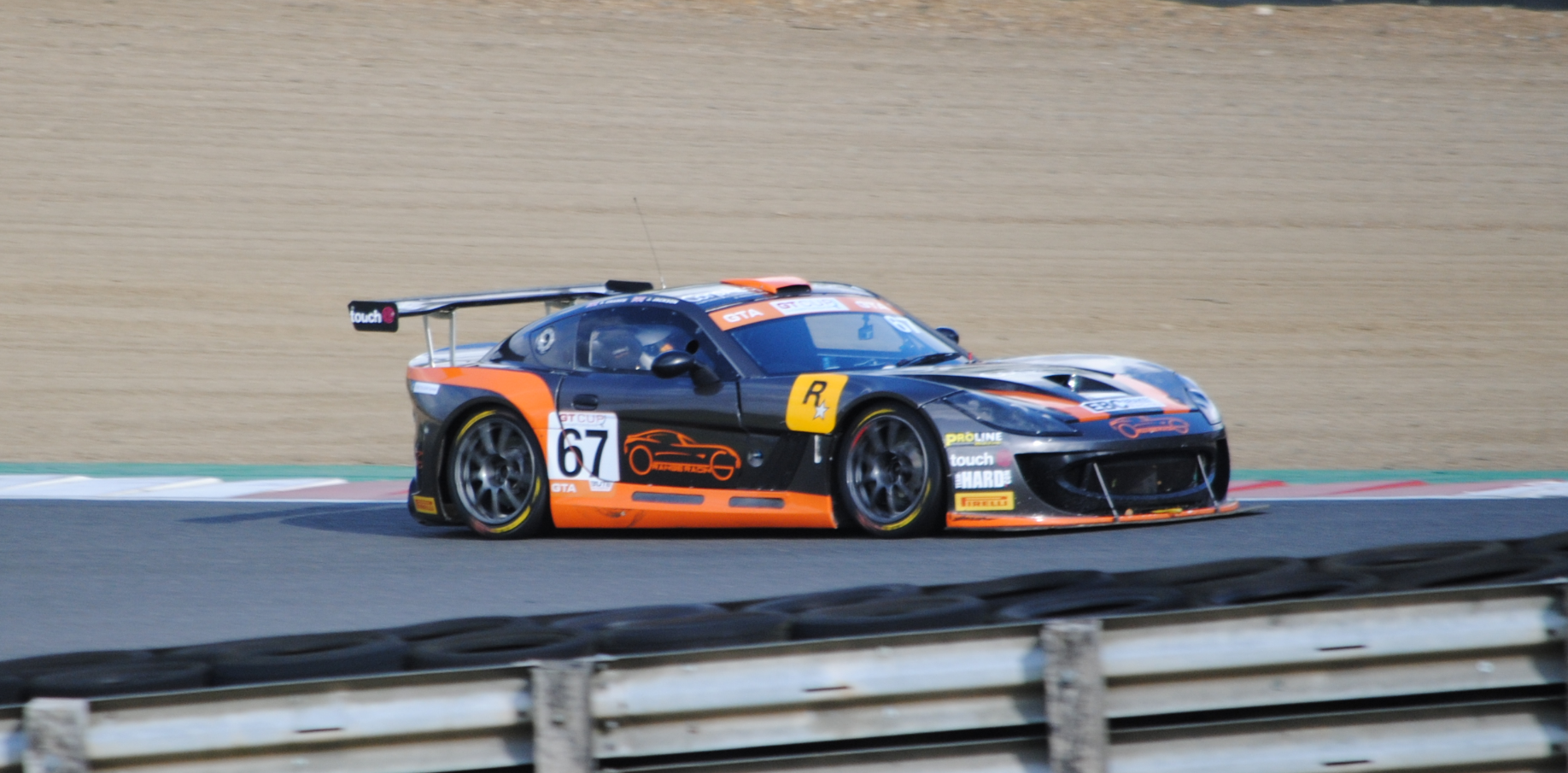
Group GTA and overall champions, Joshua Jackson and Simon Orange.

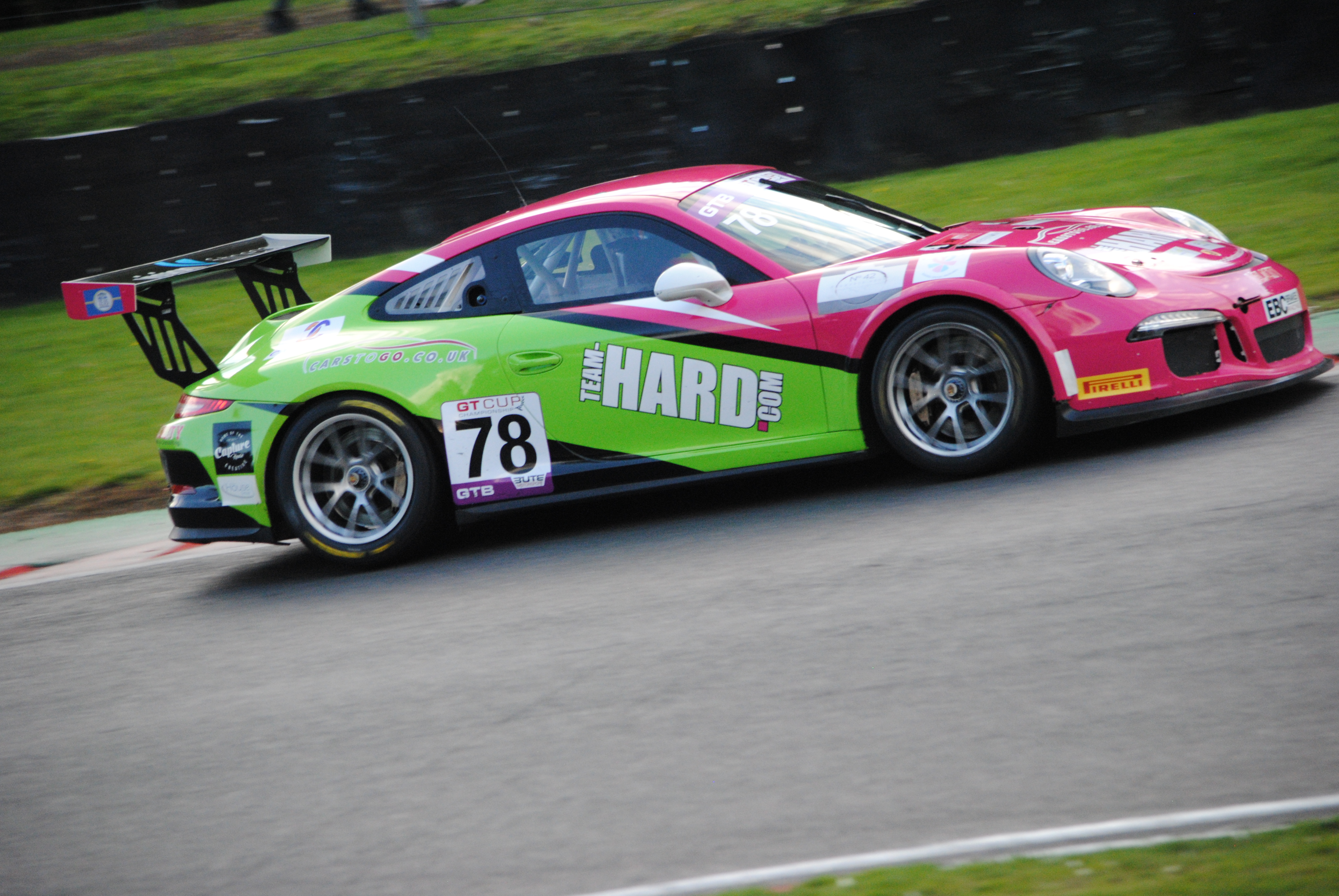
Group GTB champions, Ben Clayden and Sam Randon.

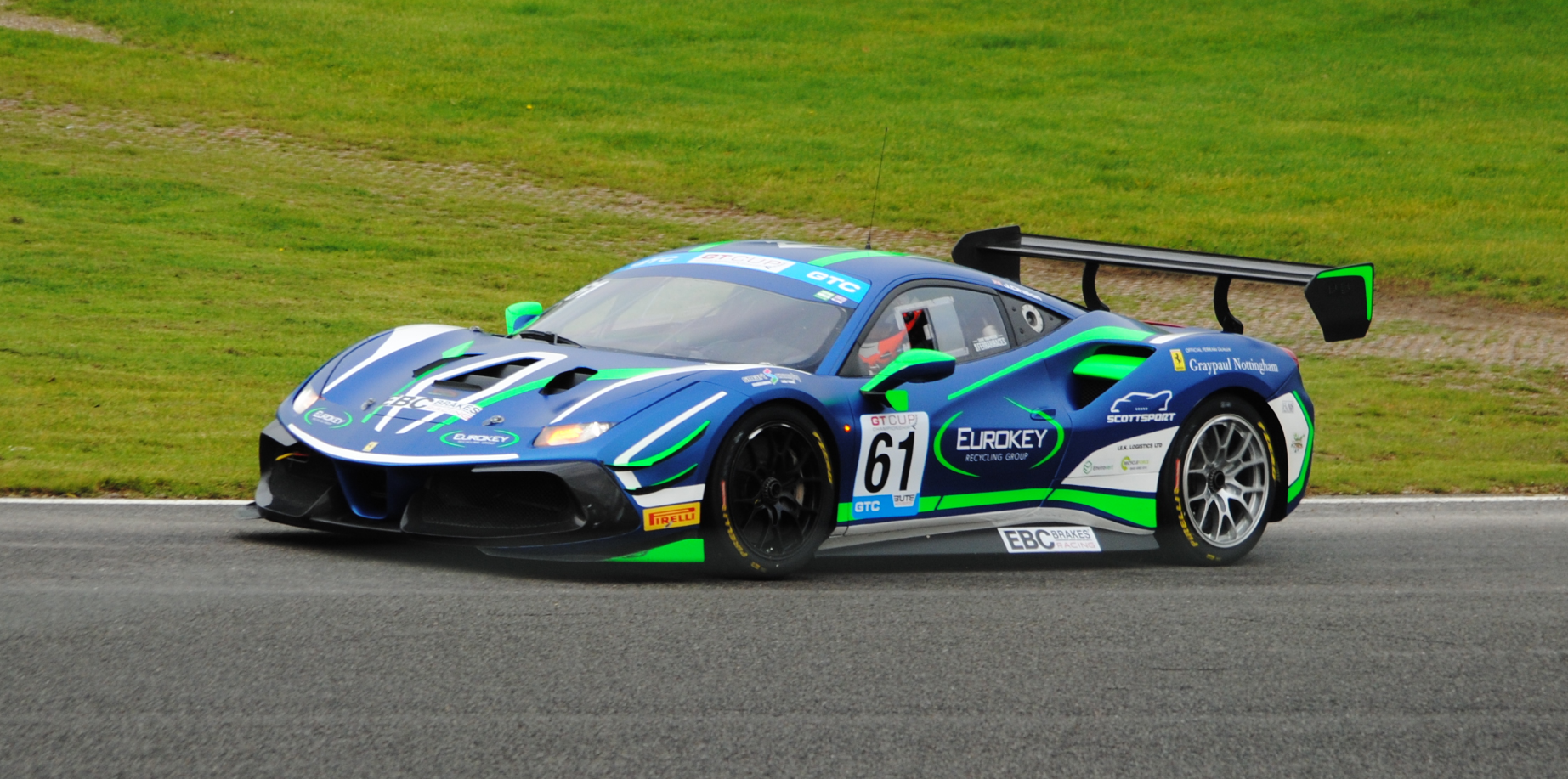
Group GTC champions, John Dhillon, Aaron Scott and Phil Quaife.

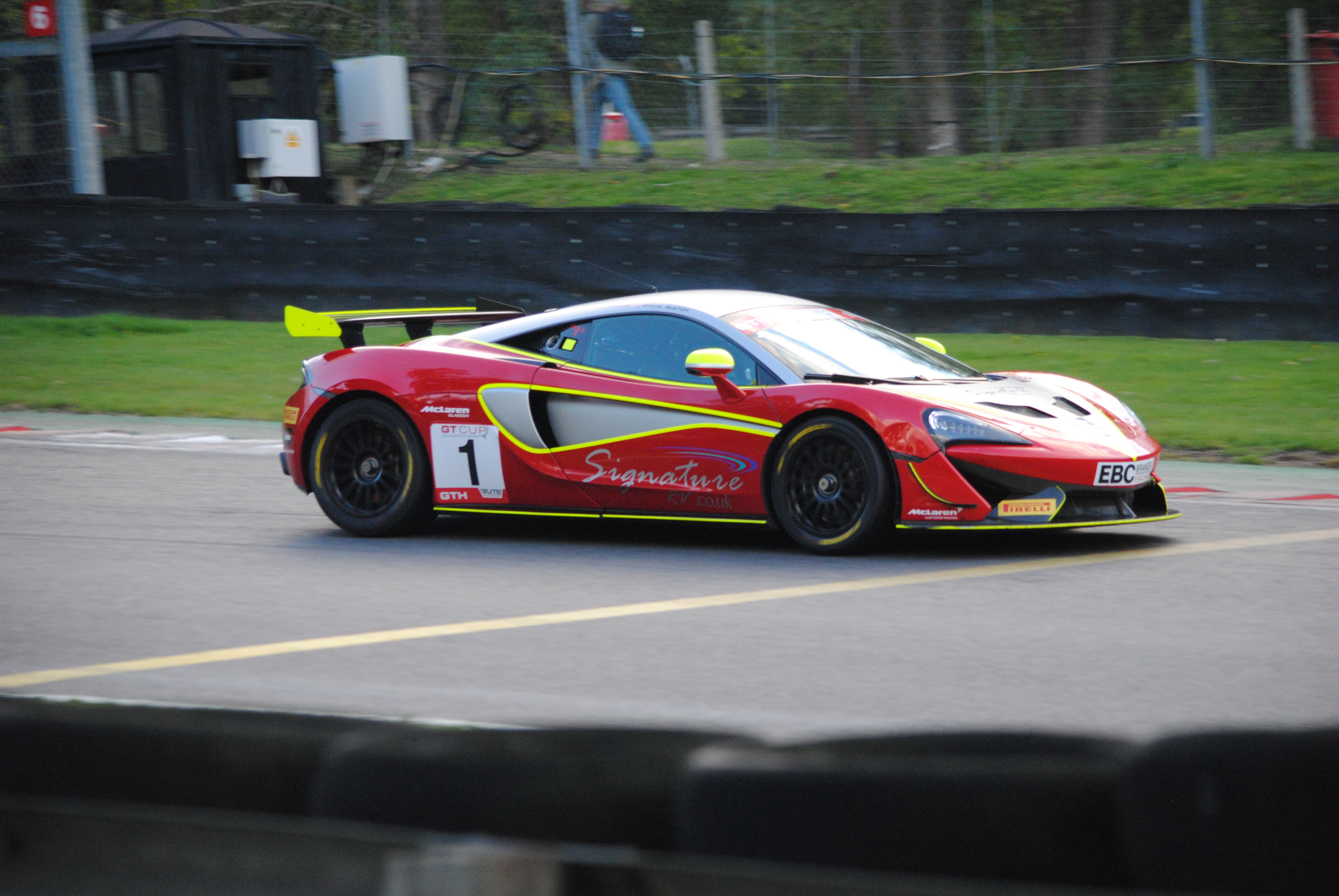
Reigning champions and Group GTH champions, Steve Ruston and John Whitehouse.

The 2020 GT Cup Championship was the 14th GT Cup Championship, a British sports car championship. The season began on 11 July at Snetterton Circuit and ended on 25 October at Donington Park, after twenty races held over five meetings.

== Calendar ==
Round	Circuit	Length	Date
1	Snetterton Circuit, Norfolk	25 min	11–12 July
2	Snetterton Circuit, Norfolk	50 min	11–12 July
3	Snetterton Circuit, Norfolk	25 min	11–12 July
4	Snetterton Circuit, Norfolk	50 min	11–12 July
5	Silverstone Circuit, Northamptonshire	25 min	15–16 August
6	Silverstone Circuit, Northamptonshire	50 min	15–16 August
7	Silverstone Circuit, Northamptonshire	25 min	15–16 August
8	Silverstone Circuit, Northamptonshire	50 min	15–16 August
9	Donington Park, Leicestershire	25 min	12–13 September
10	Donington Park, Leicestershire	50 min	12–13 September
11	Donington Park, Leicestershire	25 min	12–13 September
12	Donington Park, Leicestershire	50 min	12–13 September
13	Brands Hatch, Kent	25 min	10–11 October
14	Brands Hatch, Kent	50 min	10–11 October
15	Brands Hatch, Kent	25 min	10–11 October
16	Brands Hatch, Kent	50 min	10–11 October
17	Donington Park, Leicestershire	25 min	24–25 October
18	Donington Park, Leicestershire	50 min	24–25 October
19	Donington Park, Leicestershire	25 min	24–25 October
20	Donington Park, Leicestershire	50 min	24–25 October

== Entry list ==
Classes:
GTO: Open specification cars
GT3: GT3 cars
GTA: Cup (Ginetta G55 Supercup) cars
GTB: GT Cup (Porsche 991 GT3 Cup Gen 1, Marcos Mantis) cars
GTC: GT Cup (Porsche 991 GT3 Cup Gen 2, Ferrari Challenge) cars
GTH: GT4 cars

Team	Car	Engine	No.	Drivers	Class	Rounds
Signature RV/First Choice Group (Note: Car no. 1 is entered as Signature RV/First Choice Group and car no. 55 is entered as JMH Automotive.); JMH Automotive	McLaren 570S GT4	McLaren 3.8 L Turbo V8	1	(United Kingdom) Steve Ruston	GTH	All
Signature RV/First Choice Group; JMH Automotive	McLaren 570S GT4	McLaren 3.8 L Turbo V8	1	(United Kingdom) John Whitehouse	GTH	All
Signature RV/First Choice Group; JMH Automotive	Lamborghini Huracán GT3 Evo	Lamborghini 5.2 L V10	55	(United Kingdom) Marcus Clutton	GT3	1–12, 17–18
Signature RV/First Choice Group; JMH Automotive	Lamborghini Huracán GT3 Evo	Lamborghini 5.2 L V10	55	(United Kingdom) John Seale	GT3	1–12, 17–18
Signature RV/First Choice Group; JMH Automotive	Lamborghini Huracán GT3 Evo	Lamborghini 5.2 L V10	55	(United Kingdom) Marcus Clutton	GTO	19–20
Signature RV/First Choice Group; JMH Automotive	Lamborghini Huracán GT3 Evo	Lamborghini 5.2 L V10	55	(United Kingdom) John Seale	GTO	19–20
Topcats Racing	Marcos Mantis	Ford 4.6 L V8	3	(United Kingdom) Warren Gilbert	GTB	All
Topcats Racing	Marcos Mantis	Ford 4.6 L V8	3	(United Kingdom) Jensen Lunn	GTB	All
Topcats Racing	Marcos Mantis	Ford 4.6 L V8	99	(United Kingdom) Charlotte Gilbert	GTB	5–20
Topcats Racing	Marcos Mantis	Ford 4.6 L V8	99	(United Kingdom) Andrew Goord	GTB	5–12, 17–20
Topcats Racing	Marcos Mantis	Ford 4.6 L V8	99	(United Kingdom) Jensen Lunn	GTB	13–16
Tecserv UK; Triple M Motorsport (Note: Car no. 4 is entered as Tecserv UK and car no. 31 is entered as Triple M Motorsport.)	Nissan GT-R Nismo GT3	Nissan VR38DETT 3.8 L Turbo V6	4	(United Kingdom) Grahame Tilley	GT3	5–8, 13–20
Tecserv UK; Triple M Motorsport	Nissan GT-R Nismo GT3	Nissan VR38DETT 3.8 L Turbo V6	4	(United Kingdom) Will Tregurtha	GT3	5–8, 13–16, 19–20
Tecserv UK; Triple M Motorsport	Nissan GT-R Nismo GT3	Nissan VR38DETT 3.8 L Turbo V6	4	(United Kingdom) Sam Neary	GT3	17–18
Tecserv UK; Triple M Motorsport	Ginetta G55 GT4	Ford Cyclone 3.7 L V6	31	(United Kingdom) Ian Duggan	GTA	13–16
Tecserv UK; Triple M Motorsport	Ginetta G55 GT4	Ford Cyclone 3.7 L V6	31	(United Kingdom) Dan Morris	GTA	13–16
CTR Developments	Porsche 935	Porsche 3.3 L V8	5	(United Kingdom) Richard Chamberlain	GTO	9–12
IN2 Racing	Porsche 718 Cayman GT4 Clubsport	Porsche 3.8 L Flat-6	6	(United Kingdom) Ian Loggie	GTH	17–20
IN2 Racing	Porsche 997 GT3-R	Porsche 4.0 L Flat-6	59	(United Kingdom) Will Goff	GT3	1–4
Team ABBA Racing	Mercedes-AMG GT3	Mercedes-AMG M159 6.2 L V8	8	(United Kingdom) Richard Neary	GT3	9–12
Team ABBA Racing	Mercedes-AMG GT3	Mercedes-AMG M159 6.2 L V8	8	(United Kingdom) Sam Neary	GT3	9–12
Century Motorsport	Ginetta G55 Supercup	Ford Cyclone 3.7 L V6	9	(United Kingdom) James Kellett	GTA	5–20
Century Motorsport	Ginetta G55 Supercup	Ford Cyclone 3.7 L V6	9	(United Kingdom) Alex Stevenson	GTA	5–20
Motus One Racing	Ginetta G55 GT4	Ford Cyclone 3.7 L V6	11	(United Kingdom) Will Powell	GTH	9–12
Motus One Racing	Ginetta G55 GT4	Ford Cyclone 3.7 L V6	11	(United Kingdom) Dave Scaramanga	GTH	9–12
Whitebridge Motorsport	Aston Martin V8 Vantage GT4	Aston Martin 4.7 L V8	12	(United Kingdom) Chris Murphy	GTH	1, 3, 5, 7
Whitebridge Motorsport	Aston Martin V8 Vantage GT4	Aston Martin 4.7 L V8	12	(United Kingdom) Steve Birt	GTH	13–16
Whitebridge Motorsport	Aston Martin V8 Vantage GT4	Aston Martin 4.7 L V8	72	(United Kingdom) Chris Murphy	GTH	All
Whitebridge Motorsport	Aston Martin V8 Vantage GT4	Aston Martin 4.7 L V8	72	(United Kingdom) Steve Birt	GTH	1–8
Team Webb	Lamborghini Huracán Super Trofeo	Lamborghini 5.2 L V10	13	(United Kingdom) James Webb	GTC	9–12
Team HARD. Racing (Note: Cars no. 17, 34 and 67 is entered as Team HARD. Racing and car no. 78 is entered as Team HARD. Racing with 24-7 Motorsport.); Team HARD. Racing with 24-7 Motorsport	Ginetta G55 Supercup	Ford Cyclone 3.7 L V6	17	(United Kingdom) Patrick Collins	GTA	All
Team HARD. Racing; Team HARD. Racing with 24-7 Motorsport	Ginetta G55 Supercup	Ford Cyclone 3.7 L V6	17	(United Kingdom) Russell Lindsay	GTA	All
Team HARD. Racing; Team HARD. Racing with 24-7 Motorsport	Ginetta G55 Supercup	Ford Cyclone 3.7 L V6	34	(United Kingdom) Callum Jenkins	GTA	1–16
Team HARD. Racing; Team HARD. Racing with 24-7 Motorsport	Ginetta G55 Supercup	Ford Cyclone 3.7 L V6	34	(United Kingdom) Ollie Brown	GTA	1–4
Team HARD. Racing; Team HARD. Racing with 24-7 Motorsport	Ginetta G55 Supercup	Ford Cyclone 3.7 L V6	34	(United Kingdom) Harry Yardley-Rose	GTA	5–20
Team HARD. Racing; Team HARD. Racing with 24-7 Motorsport	Ginetta G55 Supercup	Ford Cyclone 3.7 L V6	34	(United Kingdom) Stephen Chandler	GTA	17–20
Team HARD. Racing; Team HARD. Racing with 24-7 Motorsport	Ginetta G55 Supercup	Ford Cyclone 3.7 L V6	67	(United Kingdom) Joshua Jackson	GTA	All
Team HARD. Racing; Team HARD. Racing with 24-7 Motorsport	Ginetta G55 Supercup	Ford Cyclone 3.7 L V6	67	(United Kingdom) Simon Orange	GTA	All
Team HARD. Racing; Team HARD. Racing with 24-7 Motorsport	Porsche 991 GT3 Cup	Porsche 4.0 L Flat-6	78	(United Kingdom) Ben Clayden	GTB	All
Team HARD. Racing; Team HARD. Racing with 24-7 Motorsport	Porsche 991 GT3 Cup	Porsche 4.0 L Flat-6	78	(United Kingdom) Sam Randon	GTB	All
Saxon Motorsport	BMW 150 GTR	BMW 5.0 L V10	20	(United Kingdom) Tom Barrow	GTB	9–16
SmarTrack Series Elite	Jaguar Project 8	Jaguar 5.0 L V8	22	(Germany) Immanuel Vinke	GTA	1–8
SmarTrack Series Elite	Jaguar Project 8	Jaguar 5.0 L V8	23	(United Kingdom) James Kellett	GTA	1–4
SmarTrack Series Elite	Jaguar Project 8	Jaguar 5.0 L V8	23	(United Kingdom) Alex Stevenson	GTA	1–4
SmarTrack Series Elite	Jaguar Project 8	Jaguar 5.0 L V8	24	(France) Raphael Del Sarte	GTA	1–8
SmarTrack Series Elite	Jaguar Project 8	Jaguar 5.0 L V8	24	(Netherlands) Ruben Del Sarte	GTA	1–8
Ultimate Speed	Aston Martin Vantage AMR GT3	Aston Martin 4.0 L Turbo V8	26	(United Kingdom) Michael Brown	GT3	9–12
Ultimate Speed	Aston Martin Vantage AMR GT3	Aston Martin 4.0 L Turbo V8	26	(United Kingdom) Matt Manderson	GT3	9–12
Gemini Motorsport	BMW M3 GTR	BMW 4.0 L V8	29	(United Kingdom) Andy Robey	GTB	1–8
ALP Racing	Saker RAPX	Subaru 2.0 L V8	30	(United Kingdom) David Brise	GTB	13–16
ALP Racing	Saker RAPX	Subaru 2.0 L V8	30	(United Kingdom) Alan Purbrick	GTB	13–16
Speedworks Motorsport	Toyota GR Supra GT4	BMW B58B30 3.0 L Twin-Turbo I6	32	(United Kingdom) Ron Johnson	GTH	9–12
Speedworks Motorsport	Toyota GR Supra GT4	BMW B58B30 3.0 L Twin-Turbo I6	32	(United Kingdom) Tom Ingram	GTH	9–12
G-Cat Racing	Porsche 911 GT3 R	Porsche 4.0 L Flat-6	33	(United Kingdom) Greg Caton	GT3	9–16
G-Cat Racing	Porsche 911 GT3 R	Porsche 4.0 L Flat-6	33	(United Kingdom) Shamus Jennings	GT3	9–16
Newbridge Motorsport	Aston Martin Vantage AMR GT4	Aston Martin 4.0 L Turbo V8	38	(United Kingdom) Matt Topham	GTH	9–12, 17–20
Newbridge Motorsport	Aston Martin Vantage AMR GT4	Aston Martin 4.0 L Turbo V8	38	(United Kingdom) Alex Toth-Jones	GTH	9–12, 17–20
Stanbridge Motorsport	Lotus Evora GT4	Toyota 4.0 L V6	41	(United Kingdom) James Simons	GTA	1–12
Stanbridge Motorsport	Lotus Evora GT4	Toyota 4.0 L V6	41	(United Kingdom) Fraser Smart	GTA	1–12
Stanbridge Motorsport	Aston Martin V8 Vantage GT4	Aston Martin 4.7 L V8	91	(United Kingdom) Stuart Hall	GTH	1–4
Stanbridge Motorsport	Aston Martin V8 Vantage GT4	Aston Martin 4.7 L V8	91	(United Kingdom) Chris Kemp	GTH	1–4
Scott Sport	Ferrari 488 Challenge Evo	Ferrari 3.9 L Turbo V8	61	(United Kingdom) John Dhillon	GTC	All
Scott Sport	Ferrari 488 Challenge Evo	Ferrari 3.9 L Turbo V8	61	(United Kingdom) Aaron Scott	GTC	1–8
Scott Sport	Ferrari 488 Challenge Evo	Ferrari 3.9 L Turbo V8	61	(United Kingdom) Phil Quaife	GTC	9–20
Scott Sport	Lamborghini Huracán Super Trofeo Evo	Lamborghini 5.2 L V10	77	(United Kingdom) Glynn Geddie	GTC	9–16
Scott Sport	Lamborghini Huracán Super Trofeo Evo	Lamborghini 5.2 L V10	77	(United Kingdom) Jim Geddie	GTC	9–16
Scott Sport	Ginetta G55 GT4	Ford Cyclone 3.7 L V6	80	(United Kingdom) Craig Wilkins	GTH	All
Enduro Motorsport	Mercedes-AMG GT4	Mercedes-AMG M178 4.0 L V8	66	(United Kingdom) Marcus Clutton	GTH	13–16
Enduro Motorsport	Mercedes-AMG GT4	Mercedes-AMG M178 4.0 L V8	66	(United Kingdom) Morgan Tillbrook	GTH	13–16
Geoff Steel Racing	BMW M3 GTR	BMW 4.0 L V8	71	(United Kingdom) Phil Keen	GTB	1–4
Geoff Steel Racing	BMW M3 GTR	BMW 4.0 L V8	71	(United Kingdom) Del Shelton	GTB	1–4
Geoff Steel Racing	BMW M3 GTR	BMW 4.0 L V8	888	(United Kingdom) Gareth Howell	GTB	17–20
Geoff Steel Racing	BMW M3 GTR	BMW 4.0 L V8	888	(United Kingdom) Richard Marsh	GTB	17–20
Geoff Steel Racing	BMW Evolution	BMW 4.0 L V8	138	(United Kingdom) Sam Allpass	GTO	13–16
Feathers Motorsport	Ginetta G55 GT4	Ford Cyclone 3.7 L V6	82	(United Kingdom) James Guess	GTH	1–16
WPI Motorsport	Lamborghini Huracán GT3 Evo	Lamborghini 5.2 L V10	88	(United Kingdom) Michael Igoe	GT3	1–4
WPI Motorsport	Lamborghini Huracán GT3 Evo	Lamborghini 5.2 L V10	88	(Denmark) Dennis Lind	GT3	1–4
Simon Green Motorsport	Porsche 991 GT3 Cup	Porsche 4.0 L Flat-6	98	(United Kingdom) Lee Frost	GTC	1–2
Simon Green Motorsport	Porsche 991 GT3 Cup	Porsche 4.0 L Flat-6	241	(United Kingdom) Lucky Khera	GTC	1–4
Simon Green Motorsport	Ferrari 488 Challenge	Ferrari 3.9 L Turbo V8	241	(United Kingdom) Lucky Khera	GTC	5–8
Simon Green Motorsport	Ferrari 488 Challenge	Ferrari 3.9 L Turbo V8	241	(United Kingdom) Ross Wylie	GTC	5–8
Domino's Pizza	Ginetta G55 GT4	Ford Cyclone 3.7 L V6	106	(United Kingdom) Henry Dawes	GTA	17–20
WDC Racing	McLaren 570S GT4	McLaren 3.8 L Turbo V8	171	(United Kingdom) Matt Le Breton	GTH	5–8
WDC Racing	McLaren 570S GT4	McLaren 3.8 L Turbo V8	171	(United Kingdom) Neil Garnham	GTH	5–8
WDC Racing	McLaren 570S GT4	McLaren 3.8 L Turbo V8	171	(United Kingdom) Rob Young	GTH	5–8
Makehappenracing	Ginetta G55 GT4	Ford Cyclone 3.7 L V6	212	(United Kingdom) Chris Hart	GTA	5–8, 13–16
Makehappenracing	Ginetta G55 GT4	Ford Cyclone 3.7 L V6	212	(United Kingdom) Stephen Walton	GTA	5–8, 13–16
Balfe Motorsport	McLaren 570S GT4	McLaren 3.8 L Turbo V8	222	(United Kingdom) Warren Hughes	GTH	5–8
Balfe Motorsport	McLaren 570S GT4	McLaren 3.8 L Turbo V8	222	(Switzerland) Jan Klingelnberg	GTH	5–8
24/7 Motorsport	Porsche 991 GT3 Cup	Porsche 4.0 L Flat-6	911	(United Kingdom) David Frankland	GTB	1–12. 17–20
24/7 Motorsport	Porsche 991 GT3 Cup	Porsche 4.0 L Flat-6	911	(United Kingdom) Will Tregurtha	GTB	9–12

Icon	Class
GTO	GTO Class
GT3	GT3 Class
GTA	GTA Class
GTB	GTB Class
GTC	GTC Class
GTH	GTH Class

== Results ==
Round		Circuit	Pole position	Fastest lap	Overall winner	Winning GTO	Winning GT3	Winning GTA	Winning GTB	Winning GTC	Winning GTH
1	R1	Snetterton Circuit	No. 88 WPI Motorsport	No. 88 WPI Motorsport	No. 88 WPI Motorsport	No Entrants	No. 88 WPI Motorsport	No. 34 Team HARD. Racing	No. 78 Team HARD. Racing with 24-7 Motorsport	No. 61 Scott Sport	No. 80 Scott Sport
1	R1	Snetterton Circuit	(United Kingdom) Michael Igoe (Denmark) Dennis Lind	(United Kingdom) Michael Igoe (Denmark) Dennis Lind	(United Kingdom) Michael Igoe (Denmark) Dennis Lind	No Entrants	(United Kingdom) Michael Igoe (Denmark) Dennis Lind	(United Kingdom) Ollie Brown (United Kingdom) Callum Jenkins	(United Kingdom) Ben Clayden (United Kingdom) Sam Random	(United Kingdom) John Dhillon (United Kingdom) Aaron Scott	(United Kingdom) Craig Wilkins
1	R2	Snetterton Circuit		No. 88 WPI Motorsport	No. 88 WPI Motorsport	No Entrants	No. 88 WPI Motorsport	No. 67 Team HARD. Racing	No. 78 Team HARD. Racing with 24-7 Motorsport	No. 61 Scott Sport	No. 82 Feathers Motorsport
1	R2	Snetterton Circuit		(United Kingdom) Michael Igoe (Denmark) Dennis Lind	(United Kingdom) Michael Igoe (Denmark) Dennis Lind	No Entrants	(United Kingdom) Michael Igoe (Denmark) Dennis Lind	(United Kingdom) Joshua Jackson (United Kingdom) Simon Orange	(United Kingdom) Ben Clayden (United Kingdom) Sam Random	(United Kingdom) John Dhillon (United Kingdom) Aaron Scott	(United Kingdom) James Guess
1	R3	Snetterton Circuit	No. 88 WPI Motorsport	No. 88 WPI Motorsport	No. 88 WPI Motorsport	No Entrants	No. 88 WPI Motorsport	No. 67 Team HARD. Racing	No. 3 Topcats Racing	No. 61 Scott Sport	No. 80 Scott Sport
1	R3	Snetterton Circuit	(United Kingdom) Michael Igoe (Denmark) Dennis Lind	(United Kingdom) Michael Igoe (Denmark) Dennis Lind	(United Kingdom) Michael Igoe (Denmark) Dennis Lind	No Entrants	(United Kingdom) Michael Igoe (Denmark) Dennis Lind	(United Kingdom) Joshua Jackson (United Kingdom) Simon Orange	(United Kingdom) Warren Gilbert (United Kingdom) Jensen Lunn	(United Kingdom) John Dhillon (United Kingdom) Aaron Scott	(United Kingdom) Craig Wilkins
1	R4	Snetterton Circuit		No. 88 WPI Motorsport	No. 88 WPI Motorsport	No Entrants	No. 88 WPI Motorsport	No. 34 Team HARD. Racing	No. 78 Team HARD. Racing with 24-7 Motorsport	No. 61 Scott Sport	No. 80 Scott Sport
1	R4	Snetterton Circuit		(United Kingdom) Michael Igoe (Denmark) Dennis Lind	(United Kingdom) Michael Igoe (Denmark) Dennis Lind	No Entrants	(United Kingdom) Michael Igoe (Denmark) Dennis Lind	(United Kingdom) Ollie Brown (United Kingdom) Callum Jenkins	(United Kingdom) Ben Clayden (United Kingdom) Sam Random	(United Kingdom) John Dhillon (United Kingdom) Aaron Scott	(United Kingdom) Craig Wilkins
2	R5	Silverstone Circuit	No. 4 Tecserv UK	No. 4 Tecserv UK	No. 61 Scott Sport	No Entrants	No. 55 JMH Automotive	No. 67 Team HARD. Racing	No. 3 Topcats Racing	No. 61 Scott Sport	No. 82 Feathers Motorsport
2	R5	Silverstone Circuit	(United Kingdom) Grahame Tilley (United Kingdom) Will Tregurtha	(United Kingdom) Grahame Tilley (United Kingdom) Will Tregurtha	(United Kingdom) John Dhillon (United Kingdom) Aaron Scott	No Entrants	(United Kingdom) Marcus Clutton (United Kingdom) John Seale	(United Kingdom) Joshua Jackson (United Kingdom) Simon Orange	(United Kingdom) Warren Gilbert (United Kingdom) Jensen Lunn	(United Kingdom) John Dhillon (United Kingdom) Aaron Scott	(United Kingdom) James Guess
2	R6	Silverstone Circuit		No. 55 JMH Automotive	No. 55 JMH Automotive	No Entrants	No. 55 JMH Automotive	No. 9 Century Motorsport	No. 78 Team HARD. Racing with 24-7 Motorsport	No. 241 Simon Green Motorsport	No. 1 Signature RV/First Choice Group
2	R6	Silverstone Circuit		(United Kingdom) Marcus Clutton (United Kingdom) John Seale	(United Kingdom) Marcus Clutton (United Kingdom) John Seale	No Entrants	(United Kingdom) Marcus Clutton (United Kingdom) John Seale	(United Kingdom) James Kellett (United Kingdom) Alex Stevenson	(United Kingdom) Ben Clayden (United Kingdom) Sam Random	(United Kingdom) Lucky Khera (United Kingdom) Ross Wylie	(United Kingdom) Steve Ruston (United Kingdom) John Whitehouse
2	R7	Silverstone Circuit	No. 55 JMH Automotive	No. 55 JMH Automotive	No. 55 JMH Automotive	No Entrants	No. 55 JMH Automotive	No. 212 Makehappenracing	No. 78 Team HARD. Racing with 24-7 Motorsport	No. 241 Simon Green Motorsport	No. 72 Whitebridge Motorsport
2	R7	Silverstone Circuit	(United Kingdom) Marcus Clutton (United Kingdom) John Seale	(United Kingdom) Marcus Clutton (United Kingdom) John Seale	(United Kingdom) Marcus Clutton (United Kingdom) John Seale	No Entrants	(United Kingdom) Marcus Clutton (United Kingdom) John Seale	(United Kingdom) Chris Hart (United Kingdom) Stephen Walton	(United Kingdom) Ben Clayden (United Kingdom) Sam Random	(United Kingdom) Lucky Khera (United Kingdom) Ross Wylie	(United Kingdom) Steve Birt (United Kingdom) Chris Murphy
2	R8	Silverstone Circuit		No. 241 Simon Green Motorsport	No. 241 Simon Green Motorsport	No Entrants	No. 55 JMH Automotive	No. 67 Team HARD. Racing	No. 78 Team HARD. Racing with 24-7 Motorsport	No. 241 Simon Green Motorsport	No. 1 Signature RV/First Choice Group
2	R8	Silverstone Circuit		(United Kingdom) Lucky Khera (United Kingdom) Ross Wylie	(United Kingdom) Lucky Khera (United Kingdom) Ross Wylie	No Entrants	(United Kingdom) Marcus Clutton (United Kingdom) John Seale	(United Kingdom) Joshua Jackson (United Kingdom) Simon Orange	(United Kingdom) Ben Clayden (United Kingdom) Sam Random	(United Kingdom) Lucky Khera (United Kingdom) Ross Wylie	(United Kingdom) Steve Ruston (United Kingdom) John Whitehouse
3	R9	Donington Park	No. 8 Team ABBA Racing	No. 8 Team ABBA Racing	No. 8 Team ABBA Racing	No Finishers	No. 8 Team ABBA Racing	No. 17 Team HARD. Racing	No. 20 Saxon Motorsport	No. 77 Scott Sport	No. 1 Signature RV/First Choice Group
3	R9	Donington Park	(United Kingdom) Richard Neary (United Kingdom) Sam Neary	(United Kingdom) Richard Neary (United Kingdom) Sam Neary	(United Kingdom) Richard Neary (United Kingdom) Sam Neary	No Finishers	(United Kingdom) Richard Neary (United Kingdom) Sam Neary	(United Kingdom) Patrick Collins (United Kingdom) Russell Lindsay	(United Kingdom) Tom Barrow	(United Kingdom) Glynn Geddie (United Kingdom) Jim Geddie	(United Kingdom) Steve Ruston (United Kingdom) John Whitehouse
3	R10	Donington Park		No. 55 JMH Automotive	No. 55 JMH Automotive	No. 5 CTR Developments	No. 55 JMH Automotive	No. 9 Century Motorsport	No. 20 Saxon Motorsport	No. 77 Scott Sport	No. 1 Signature RV/First Choice Group
3	R10	Donington Park		(United Kingdom) Marcus Clutton (United Kingdom) John Seale	(United Kingdom) Marcus Clutton (United Kingdom) John Seale	(United Kingdom) Richard Chamberlain	(United Kingdom) Marcus Clutton (United Kingdom) John Seale	(United Kingdom) James Kellett (United Kingdom) Alex Stevenson	(United Kingdom) Tom Barrow	(United Kingdom) Glynn Geddie (United Kingdom) Jim Geddie	(United Kingdom) Steve Ruston (United Kingdom) John Whitehouse
3	R11	Donington Park	No. 8 Team ABBA Racing	No. 8 Team ABBA Racing	No. 8 Team ABBA Racing	No Finishers	No. 8 Team ABBA Racing	No. 67 Team HARD. Racing	No. 3 Topcats Racing	No. 13 Team Webb	No. 1 Signature RV/First Choice Group
3	R11	Donington Park	(United Kingdom) Richard Neary (United Kingdom) Sam Neary	(United Kingdom) Richard Neary (United Kingdom) Sam Neary	(United Kingdom) Richard Neary (United Kingdom) Sam Neary	No Finishers	(United Kingdom) Richard Neary (United Kingdom) Sam Neary	(United Kingdom) Joshua Jackson (United Kingdom) Simon Orange	(United Kingdom) Warren Gilbert (United Kingdom) Jensen Lunn	(United Kingdom) James Webb	(United Kingdom) Steve Ruston (United Kingdom) John Whitehouse
3	R12	Donington Park		No. 55 JMH Automotive	No. 33 G-Cat Racing	No Finishers	No. 33 G-Cat Racing	No. 67 Team HARD. Racing	No. 911 24/7 Motorsport	No. 61 Scott Sport	No. 1 Signature RV/First Choice Group
3	R12	Donington Park		(United Kingdom) Marcus Clutton (United Kingdom) John Seale	(United Kingdom) Greg Caton (United Kingdom) Shamus Jennings	No Finishers	(United Kingdom) Greg Caton (United Kingdom) Shamus Jennings	(United Kingdom) Joshua Jackson (United Kingdom) Simon Orange	(United Kingdom) David Frankland (United Kingdom) Will Tregurtha	(United Kingdom) John Dhillon (United Kingdom) Phil Quaife	(United Kingdom) Steve Ruston (United Kingdom) John Whitehouse
4	R13	Brands Hatch	No. 4 Tecserv UK	No. 4 Tecserv UK	No. 33 G-Cat Racing	No Finishers	No. 33 G-Cat Racing	No. 67 Team HARD. Racing	No. 30 ALP Racing	No. 61 Scott Sport	No. 80 Scott Sport
4	R13	Brands Hatch	(United Kingdom) Grahame Tilley (United Kingdom) Will Tregurtha	(United Kingdom) Grahame Tilley (United Kingdom) Will Tregurtha	(United Kingdom) Greg Caton (United Kingdom) Shamus Jennings	No Finishers	(United Kingdom) Greg Caton (United Kingdom) Shamus Jennings	(United Kingdom) Joshua Jackson (United Kingdom) Simon Orange	(United Kingdom) David Brise (United Kingdom) Alan Purbrick	(United Kingdom) John Dhillon (United Kingdom) Phil Quaife	(United Kingdom) Craig Wilkins
4	R14	Brands Hatch		No. 4 Tecserv UK	No. 61 Scott Sport	No. 138 Geoff Steel Racing	No. 33 G-Cat Racing	No. 67 Team HARD. Racing	No. 78 Team HARD. Racing with 24-7 Motorsport	No. 61 Scott Sport	No. 66 Enduro Motorsport
4	R14	Brands Hatch		(United Kingdom) Grahame Tilley (United Kingdom) Will Tregurtha	(United Kingdom) John Dhillon (United Kingdom) Phil Quaife	(United Kingdom) Sam Allpass	(United Kingdom) Greg Caton (United Kingdom) Shamus Jennings	(United Kingdom) Joshua Jackson (United Kingdom) Simon Orange	(United Kingdom) Ben Clayden (United Kingdom) Sam Random	(United Kingdom) John Dhillon (United Kingdom) Phil Quaife	(United Kingdom) Marcus Clutton (United Kingdom) Morgan Tillbrook
4	R15	Brands Hatch	No. 4 Tecserv UK	No. 4 Tecserv UK	No. 4 Tecserv UK	No. 138 Geoff Steel Racing	No. 4 Tecserv UK	No. 212 Makehappenracing	No. 78 Team HARD. Racing with 24-7 Motorsport	No. 77 Scott Sport	No. 82 Feathers Motorsport
4	R15	Brands Hatch	(United Kingdom) Grahame Tilley (United Kingdom) Will Tregurtha	(United Kingdom) Grahame Tilley (United Kingdom) Will Tregurtha	(United Kingdom) Grahame Tilley (United Kingdom) Will Tregurtha	(United Kingdom) Sam Allpass	(United Kingdom) Grahame Tilley (United Kingdom) Will Tregurtha	(United Kingdom) Chris Hart (United Kingdom) Stephen Walton	(United Kingdom) Ben Clayden (United Kingdom) Sam Random	(United Kingdom) Glynn Geddie (United Kingdom) Jim Geddie	(United Kingdom) James Guess
4	R16	Brands Hatch		No. 4 Tecserv UK	No. 4 Tecserv UK	No. 138 Geoff Steel Racing	No. 4 Tecserv UK	No. 212 Makehappenracing	No. 30 ALP Racing	No. 61 Scott Sport	No. 82 Feathers Motorsport
4	R16	Brands Hatch		(United Kingdom) Grahame Tilley (United Kingdom) Will Tregurtha	(United Kingdom) Grahame Tilley (United Kingdom) Will Tregurtha	(United Kingdom) Sam Allpass	(United Kingdom) Grahame Tilley (United Kingdom) Will Tregurtha	(United Kingdom) Chris Hart (United Kingdom) Stephen Walton	(United Kingdom) David Brise (United Kingdom) Alan Purbrick	(United Kingdom) John Dhillon (United Kingdom) Phil Quaife	(United Kingdom) James Guess
5	R17	Donington Park	No. 4 Tecserv UK	No. 4 Tecserv UK	No. 4 Tecserv UK	No Entrants	No. 4 Tecserv UK	No. 106 Domino's Pizza	No. 78 Team HARD. Racing with 24-7 Motorsport	No. 61 Scott Sport	No. 38 Newbridge Motorsport
5	R17	Donington Park	(United Kingdom) Sam Neary (United Kingdom) Grahame Tilley	(United Kingdom) Sam Neary (United Kingdom) Grahame Tilley	(United Kingdom) Sam Neary (United Kingdom) Grahame Tilley	No Entrants	(United Kingdom) Sam Neary (United Kingdom) Grahame Tilley	(United Kingdom) Henry Dawes	(United Kingdom) Ben Clayden (United Kingdom) Sam Random	(United Kingdom) John Dhillon (United Kingdom) Phil Quaife	(United Kingdom) Matt Topham (United Kingdom) Alex Toth-Jones
5	R18	Donington Park		No. 55 JMH Automotive	No. 55 JMH Automotive	No Entrants	No. 55 JMH Automotive	No. 106 Domino's Pizza	No. 78 Team HARD. Racing with 24-7 Motorsport	No. 61 Scott Sport	No. 6 In2 Racing
5	R18	Donington Park		(United Kingdom) Marcus Clutton (United Kingdom) John Seale	(United Kingdom) Marcus Clutton (United Kingdom) John Seale	No Entrants	(United Kingdom) Marcus Clutton (United Kingdom) John Seale	(United Kingdom) Henry Dawes	(United Kingdom) Ben Clayden (United Kingdom) Sam Random	(United Kingdom) John Dhillon (United Kingdom) Phil Quaife	(United Kingdom) Ian Loggie
5	R19	Donington Park	No. 55 JMH Automotive	No. 55 JMH Automotive	No. 55 JMH Automotive	No. 55 JMH Automotive	No Finishers	No. 212 Makehappenracing	No. 78 Team HARD. Racing with 24-7 Motorsport	No. 61 Scott Sport	No. 38 Newbridge Motorsport
5	R19	Donington Park	(United Kingdom) Marcus Clutton (United Kingdom) John Seale	(United Kingdom) Marcus Clutton (United Kingdom) John Seale	(United Kingdom) Marcus Clutton (United Kingdom) John Seale	(United Kingdom) Marcus Clutton (United Kingdom) John Seale	No Finishers	(United Kingdom) Chris Hart (United Kingdom) Stephen Walton	(United Kingdom) Ben Clayden (United Kingdom) Sam Random	(United Kingdom) John Dhillon (United Kingdom) Phil Quaife	(United Kingdom) Matt Topham (United Kingdom) Alex Toth-Jones
5	R20	Donington Park		No. 55 JMH Automotive	No. 55 JMH Automotive	No. 55 JMH Automotive	No Finishers	No. 106 Domino's Pizza	No. 78 Team HARD. Racing with 24-7 Motorsport	No. 61 Scott Sport	No. 38 Newbridge Motorsport
5	R20	Donington Park		(United Kingdom) Marcus Clutton (United Kingdom) John Seale	(United Kingdom) Marcus Clutton (United Kingdom) John Seale	(United Kingdom) Marcus Clutton (United Kingdom) John Seale	No Finishers	(United Kingdom) Henry Dawes	(United Kingdom) Ben Clayden (United Kingdom) Sam Random	(United Kingdom) John Dhillon (United Kingdom) Phil Quaife	(United Kingdom) Matt Topham (United Kingdom) Alex Toth-Jones

=== Overall championship standings ===
Points are awarded as follows:

System	1st	2nd	3rd	4th	5th	6th	7th	8th	9th	10th	PP	Fastest lap
3+	25	18	15	12	10	8	6	4	2	1	1	1
2	18	15	12	10	8	6	4	2	1		1	1
1	15	12	10	8	6	4	2	1			1	1

(key)

Pos.	Drivers	No.	Class	SNE				SIL‡				DON1				BRH				DON2				Pts
1	(United Kingdom) Joshua Jackson (United Kingdom) Simon Orange	67	GTA	13	11	9	6	6	10	7	5	21	12	9	7	4	8	12	16	6	8	10	14	465
2	(United Kingdom) Ben Clayden (United Kingdom) Sam Randon	78	GTB	4	5	12	8	5	4	3	3	10	9	20	12	Ret	5	4	8	3	10	3	5	419
3	(United Kingdom) Steve Ruston (United Kingdom) John Whitehouse	1	GTH	10	8	8	7	10	6	10	6	9	8	8	8	8	9	14	11	7	11	8	DNS	387.5
4	(United Kingdom) Warren Gilbert (United Kingdom) Jensen Lunn	3	GTB	21	15	5	Ret	4	9	4	11	8	7	6	16	13	16	5	4	8	16	6	10	377
5	(United Kingdom) John Dhillon	61	GTC	3	2	2	2	1	3	18	2	5	Ret	4	3	2	1	3	2	2	2	2	2	349.5
5	(United Kingdom) Aaron Scott	61	GTC	3	2	2	2	1	3	18	2													349.5
5	(United Kingdom) Phil Quaife	61	GTC									5	Ret	4	3	2	1	3	2	2	2	2	2	349.5
6	(United Kingdom) James Guess	82	GTH	12	7	7	Ret	9	11	13	9	13	DNS	DNS	DNS	6	13	13	10	10	7	11	11	311
7	(United Kingdom) Craig Wilkins	80	GTH	7	12	6	5	Ret	Ret	14	8	DNS	DNS	11	10	5	14	Ret	13	14	9	12	9	302
8	(United Kingdom) Patrick Collins (United Kingdom) Russell Lindsay	17	GTA	DNS	Ret	11	9	20	14	12	14	11	14	18	Ret	12	21	18	12	17	13	14	12	281
9	(United Kingdom) Chris Murphy	72	GTH	11	13	17	11	19	15	9	Ret	14	Ret	14	9	15	18	16	14	15	12	13	13	273
9	(United Kingdom) Steve Birt	72	GTH	11	13	17	11	19	15	9	Ret													273
10	(United Kingdom) James Kellett (United Kingdom) Alex Stevenson	23	GTA	20	Ret	Ret	DNS																	260.5
10	(United Kingdom) James Kellett (United Kingdom) Alex Stevenson	9	GTA					17	7	17	12	19	10	Ret	11	16	12	17	15	18	Ret	15	6	260.5
11	(United Kingdom) Callum Jenkins	34	GTA	8	18	15	4	7	Ret	11	7	DSQ	Ret	16	Ret	10	17	15	7					235
11	(United Kingdom) Ollie Brown	34	GTA	8	18	15	4																	235
11	(United Kingdom) Harry Yardley-Rose	34	GTA					7	Ret	11	7	DSQ	Ret	16	Ret	10	17	15	7	16	Ret	DNS	DNS	235
11	(United Kingdom) Stephen Chandler	34	GTA																	16	Ret	DNS	DNS	235
12	(United Kingdom) David Frankland	911	GTB	15	14	14	10	16	13	DNS	13	18	15	19	6					Ret	15	Ret	DNS	178.5
12	(United Kingdom) Will Tregurtha	911	GTB									18	15	19	6									178.5
13	(United Kingdom) Charlotte Gilbert	99	GTB					18	16	8	16	16	DNS	12	17	18	20	10	17	11	DNS	DNS	DNS	164
13	(United Kingdom) Andrew Goord	99	GTB					18	16	8	16	16	DNS	12	17									164
13	(United Kingdom) Jensen Lunn	99	GTB													18	20	10	17					164
13	(United Kingdom) Warren Gilbert	99	GTB																	11	DNS	DNS	DNS	164
14	(United Kingdom) Marcus Clutton (United Kingdom) John Seale	55	GT3	Ret	DNS	DNS	DNS	3	1	1	10	3	1	Ret	2					19	1			141
15	(United Kingdom) James Simons (United Kingdom) Fraser Smart	41	GTA	17	17	20	13	14	17	15	Ret	Ret	DNS	DNS	DNS									84
16	(United Kingdom) Grahame Tilley	4	GT3					Ret	DNS	DNS	DNS					Ret	4	1	1	1	DNS	DNS	DNS	72
16	(United Kingdom) Will Tregurtha	4	GT3					Ret	DNS	DNS	DNS					Ret	4	1	1			DNS	DNS	72
16	(United Kingdom) Sam Neary	4	GT3																	1	DNS			72
17	(United Kingdom) Chris Murphy	12	GTH	19		13		12																67
17	(United Kingdom) Steve Birt	12	GTH							16						17	19	DNS	DNS					67
18	(United Kingdom) Andy Robey	29	GTB	14	10	16	DNS	11	Ret	Ret	DNS													58
19	(Germany) Immanuel Vinke	22	GTA	16	16	18	Ret	Ret	Ret	DNS	DNS													45
20	(France) Raphael Del Sarte (Netherlands) Ruben Del Sarte	24	GTA	18	Ret	19	12	DNS	DNS	DNS	DNS													32
21	(United Kingdom) Stuart Hall (United Kingdom) Chris Kemp	91	GTH	22	9	Ret	DNS																	23
22	(United Kingdom) Richard Chamberlain	5	GTO									DNS	16	DNS	DNS									16
Entries ineligible to score points
	(United Kingdom) Michael Igoe (Denmark) Dennis Lind	88	GT3	1	1	1	1																	
	(United Kingdom) Greg Caton (United Kingdom) Shamus Jennings	33	GT3									6	DSQ	2	1	1	2	Ret	DNS					
	(United Kingdom) Richard Neary (United Kingdom) Sam Neary	8	GT3									1	2	1	DSQ									
	(United Kingdom) Marcus Clutton (United Kingdom) John Seale	55	GTO																			1	1	
	(United Kingdom) Lucky Khera	241	GTC	5	4	4	3	2	2	2	1													
	(United Kingdom) Ross Wylie	241	GTC					2	2	2	1													
	(United Kingdom) Glynn Geddie (United Kingdom) Jim Geddie	77	GTC									4	4	5	DNS	3	3	2	Ret					
	(United Kingdom) Will Goff	59	GT3	2	3	3	DNS																	
	(United Kingdom) Mike Brown (United Kingdom) Mike Manderson	26	GT3									2	3	13	5									
	(United Kingdom) Henry Dawes	106	GTA																	4	3	5	4	
	(United Kingdom) James Webb	13	GTC									20	5	3	4									
	(United Kingdom) Matt Topham (United Kingdom) Alex Toth-Jones	38	GTH									12	Ret	10	Ret					5	6	7	3	
	(United Kingdom) David Brise (United Kingdom) Alan Purbrick	30	GTB													9	Ret	9	3					
	(United Kingdom) Chris Hart (United Kingdom) Stephen Walton	212	GTA					15	8	6	15					11	10	6	5	13	4	4	7	
	(United Kingdom) Warren Hughes (Switzerland) Jan Klingelnberg	222	GTB					13	5	5	4													
	(United Kingdom) Ian Loggie	6	GTH																	9	5	9	8	
	(United Kingdom) Tom Barrow	20	GTB									7	6	7	15	Ret	6	8	6					
	(United Kingdom) Lee Frost	98	GTC	6	6																			
	(United Kingdom) Marcus Clutton (United Kingdom) Morgan Tillbrook	66	GTH													7	7	Ret	Ret					
	(United Kingdom) Ian Duggan (United Kingdom) Dan Morris	31	GTA													14	15	7	Ret					
	(United Kingdom) Matt Le Breton (United Kingdom) Neil Garnham (United Kingdom) Rob Young	171	GTB					8	12	10	DNS													
	(United Kingdom) Phil Keen (United Kingdom) Del Shelton	71	GTB	9	Ret	10	DNS																	
	(United Kingdom) Sam Allpass	138	GTO													DNS	11	11	9					
	(United Kingdom) Ron Johnson (United Kingdom) Tom Ingram	32	GTH									15	11	15	13									
	(United Kingdom) Gareth Howell (United Kingdom) Richard Marsh	888	GTB																	12	14	Ret	DNS	
	(United Kingdom) Will Powell (United Kingdom) Dave Scaramanga	11	GTH									17	13	17	14									
Pos.	Drivers	No.	Class	SNE				SIL‡				DON1				BRH				DON2				Pts

Colour	Result
Gold	Winner
Silver	Second place
Bronze	Third place
Green	Points classification
Blue	Non-points classification
Blue	Non-classified finish (NC)
Purple	Retired, not classified (Ret)
Red	Did not qualify (DNQ)
Red	Did not pre-qualify (DNPQ)
Black	Disqualified (DSQ)
White	Did not start (DNS)
White	Withdrew (WD)
White	Race cancelled (C)
Blank	Did not practice (DNP)
Blank	Did not arrive (DNA)
Blank	Excluded (EX)

‡ – Race 4 at Silverstone was stopped after 5 laps due to heavy rain and half points were awarded.

=== Class championship standings ===
Points are awarded as follows:

System	1st	2nd	3rd	4th	5th	6th	7th	8th	9th	10th	PP	Fastest lap
3+	25	18	15	12	10	8	6	4	2	1	1	1
2	18	15	12	10	8	6	4	2	1		1	1
1	15	12	10	8	6	4	2	1			1	1

(key)

Pos.	Drivers	No.	SNE				SIL‡				DON1				BRH				DON2				Pts
GTO
1	(United Kingdom) Richard Chamberlain	5									DNS	16	DNS	DNS									16
Entries ineligible to score points
	(United Kingdom) Marcus Clutton (United Kingdom) John Seale	55																			1	1	
	(United Kingdom) Sam Allpass	138													DNS	11	11	9					
GT3
1	(United Kingdom) Marcus Clutton (United Kingdom) John Seale	55	Ret	DNS	DNS	DNS	3	1	1	10	3	1	Ret	2					19	1			141
2	(United Kingdom) Grahame Tilley	4					Ret	DNS	DNS	DNS					Ret	4	1	1	1	DNS	DNS	DNS	72
2	(United Kingdom) Will Tregurtha	4					Ret	DNS	DNS	DNS					Ret	4	1	1			DNS	DNS	72
2	(United Kingdom) Sam Neary	4																	1	DNS			72
Entries ineligible to score points
	(United Kingdom) Michael Igoe (Denmark) Dennis Lind	88	1	1	1	1																	
	(United Kingdom) Richard Neary (United Kingdom) Sam Neary	8									1	2	1	DSQ									
	(United Kingdom) Greg Caton (United Kingdom) Shamus Jennings	33									6	DSQ	2	1	1	2	Ret	DNS					
	(United Kingdom) Will Goff	59	2	3	3	DNS																	
	(United Kingdom) Mike Brown (United Kingdom) Mike Manderson	26									2	3	13	5									
GTA
1	(United Kingdom) Joshua Jackson (United Kingdom) Simon Orange	67	13	11	9	6	6	10	7	5	21	12	9	7	4	8	12	16	6	8	10	14	465
2	(United Kingdom) Patrick Collins (United Kingdom) Russell Lindsay	17	DNS	Ret	11	9	20	14	12	14	11	14	18	Ret	12	21	18	12	17	13	14	12	281
3	(United Kingdom) James Kellett (United Kingdom) Alex Stevenson	23	20	Ret	Ret	DNS																	260.5
3	(United Kingdom) James Kellett (United Kingdom) Alex Stevenson	9					17	7	17	12	19	10	Ret	11	16	12	17	15	18	Ret	15	6	260.5
4	(United Kingdom) Callum Jenkins	34	8	18	15	4	7	Ret	11	7	DSQ	Ret	16	Ret	10	17	15	7					235
4	(United Kingdom) Ollie Brown	34	8	18	15	4																	235
4	(United Kingdom) Harry Yardley-Rose	34					7	Ret	11	7	DSQ	Ret	16	Ret	10	17	15	7	16	Ret	DNS	DNS	235
4	(United Kingdom) Stephen Chandler	34																	16	Ret	DNS	DNS	235
5	(United Kingdom) James Simons (United Kingdom) Fraser Smart	41	17	17	20	13	14	17	15	Ret	Ret	Ret	DNS	DNS									84
6	(Germany) Immanuel Vinke	22	16	16	18	Ret	Ret	Ret	DNS	DNS													45
7	(France) Raphael Del Sarte (Netherlands) Ruben Del Sarte	24	18	Ret	19	12	DNS	DNS	DNS	DNS													32
Entries ineligible to score points
	(United Kingdom) Henry Dawes	106																	4	3	5	4	
	(United Kingdom) Chris Hart (United Kingdom) Stephen Walton	212					15	8	6	15					11	10	6	5	13	4	4	7	
	(United Kingdom) Ian Duggan (United Kingdom) Dan Morris	31													14	15	7	Ret					
GTB
1	(United Kingdom) Ben Clayden (United Kingdom) Sam Randon	78	4	5	12	8	5	4	3	3	10	9	20	12	Ret	5	4	8	3	10	3	5	419
2	(United Kingdom) Warren Gilbert (United Kingdom) Jensen Lunn	3	21	15	5	Ret	4	9	4	11	8	7	6	16	13	16	5	4	7	16	6	10	377
3	(United Kingdom) David Frankland	911	15	14	14	10	16	13	DNS	13	18	15	19	6					Ret	15	Ret	DNS	178.5
3	(United Kingdom) Will Tregurtha	911									18	15	19	6									178.5
4	(United Kingdom) Charlotte Gilbert	99					18	16	8	16	16	DNS	12	17	18	20	10	17	11	DNS	DNS	DNS	164
4	(United Kingdom) Andrew Goord	99					18	16	8	16	16	DNS	12	17									164
4	(United Kingdom) Jensen Lunn	99													18	20	10	17					164
4	(United Kingdom) Warren Gilbert	99																	11	DNS	DNS	DNS	164
5	(United Kingdom) Andy Robey	29	14	10	16	DNS	11	Ret	Ret	DNS													58
Entries ineligible to score points
	(United Kingdom) David Brise (United Kingdom) Alan Purbrick	30													9	Ret	9	3					
	(United Kingdom) Warren Hughes (Switzerland) Jan Klingelnberg	222					13	5	5	4													
	(United Kingdom) Tom Barrow	20									7	6	7	15	Ret	6	8	6					
	(United Kingdom) Matt Le Breton (United Kingdom) Neil Garnham (United Kingdom) Rob Young	171					8	12	10	DNS													
	(United Kingdom) Phil Keen (United Kingdom) Del Shelton	71	9	Ret	10	DNS																	
	(United Kingdom) Gareth Howell (United Kingdom) Richard Marsh	888																	12	14	Ret	DNS	
GTC
1	(United Kingdom) John Dhillon	61	3	2	2	2	1	3	18	2	5	Ret	4	3	2	1	3	2	2	2	2	2	349.5
1	(United Kingdom) Aaron Scott	61	3	2	2	2	1	3	18	2													349.5
1	(United Kingdom) Phil Quaife	61									5	Ret	4	3	2	1	3	2	2	2	2	2	349.5
Entries ineligible to score points
	(United Kingdom) Lucky Khera	241	5	4	4	3	2	2	2	1													
	(United Kingdom) Ross Wylie	241					2	2	2	1													
	(United Kingdom) James Webb	13									20	5	3	4									
	(United Kingdom) Glynn Geddie (United Kingdom) Jim Geddie	77									4	4	5	DNS	3	3	2	Ret					
	(United Kingdom) Lee Frost	98	6	6																			
GTH
1	(United Kingdom) Steve Ruston (United Kingdom) John Whitehouse	1	10	8	8	7	10	6	10	6	9	8	8	8	8	9	14	11	7	11	8	DNS	387.5
2	(United Kingdom) James Guess	82	12	7	7	Ret	9	11	13	9	13	DNS	DNS	DNS	6	13	13	10	10	7	11	11	212
3	(United Kingdom) Craig Wilkins	80	7	12	6	5	Ret	Ret	14	8	DNS	DNS	11	10	5	14	Ret	13	14	9	12	9	207
4	(United Kingdom) Chris Murphy	72	11	13	17	11	19	15	9	Ret	14	Ret	14	9	15	18	16	14	15	12	13	13	202
4	(United Kingdom) Steve Birt	72	11	13	17	11	19	15	9	Ret													202
5	(United Kingdom) Chris Murphy	12	19		13		12																67
5	(United Kingdom) Steve Birt	12							16						17	19	DNS	DNS					67
6	(United Kingdom) Stuart Hall (United Kingdom) Chris Kemp	91	22	9	Ret	DNS																	23
Entries ineligible to score points
	(United Kingdom) Matt Topham (United Kingdom) Alex Toth-Jones	38									12	Ret	10	Ret					5	6	7	3	
	(United Kingdom) Marcus Clutton (United Kingdom) Morgan Tillbrook	66													7	7	Ret	Ret					
	(United Kingdom) Ian Loggie	6																	9	5	9	8	
	(United Kingdom) Ron Johnson (United Kingdom) Tom Ingram	32									15	11	15	13									
	(United Kingdom) Will Powell (United Kingdom) Dave Scaramanga	11									17	13	17	14									
Pos.	Drivers	No.	SNE				SIL‡				DON1				BRH				DON2				Pts

Colour	Result
Gold	Winner
Silver	Second place
Bronze	Third place
Green	Points classification
Blue	Non-points classification
Blue	Non-classified finish (NC)
Purple	Retired, not classified (Ret)
Red	Did not qualify (DNQ)
Red	Did not pre-qualify (DNPQ)
Black	Disqualified (DSQ)
White	Did not start (DNS)
White	Withdrew (WD)
White	Race cancelled (C)
Blank	Did not practice (DNP)
Blank	Did not arrive (DNA)
Blank	Excluded (EX)

‡ – Race 4 at Silverstone was stopped after 5 laps due to heavy rain and half points were awarded.
