= 2022 GT Cup Championship =

The 2022 GT Cup Championship was the 16th GT Cup Championship, a British sports car championship. The season began on 9 April at Donington Park and ended on 9 October at Snetterton Circuit, after twenty-six races held over seven meetings.

The championship's sixth round was featured on Top Gear Series 33, Episode 4 demonstrating their scratch-built race team.

== Calendar ==
The calendar was announced on 21 September 2021. The championship will support the 2022 GT World Challenge Europe Sprint Cup at Brands Hatch.

Round	Circuit	Length	Date	Supporting
1	Donington Park National, Leicestershire	25 min	9–10 April	
2	Donington Park National, Leicestershire	50 min	9–10 April	
3	Donington Park National, Leicestershire	25 min	9–10 April	
4	Donington Park National, Leicestershire	50 min	9–10 April	
5	Brands Hatch GP, Kent	25 min	30 April–1 May	GT World Challenge Europe Sprint Cup
6	Brands Hatch GP, Kent	50 min	30 April–1 May	GT World Challenge Europe Sprint Cup
7	Brands Hatch GP, Kent	25 min	30 April–1 May	GT World Challenge Europe Sprint Cup
8	Brands Hatch GP, Kent	50 min	30 April–1 May	GT World Challenge Europe Sprint Cup
9	Snetterton Circuit, Norfolk	25 min	11–12 June	
10	Snetterton Circuit, Norfolk	50 min	11–12 June	
11	Snetterton Circuit, Norfolk	25 min	11–12 June	
12	Snetterton Circuit, Norfolk	50 min	11–12 June	
13	Oulton Park, Cheshire	50 min	9 July	
14	Oulton Park, Cheshire	50 min	9 July	
15	Silverstone GP, Northamptonshire	25 min	30–31 July	
16	Silverstone GP, Northamptonshire	50 min	30–31 July	
17	Silverstone GP, Northamptonshire	25 min	30–31 July	
18	Silverstone GP, Northamptonshire	50 min	30–31 July	
19	Donington Park GP, Leicestershire	25 min	18–19 September	
20	Donington Park GP, Leicestershire	50 min	18–19 September	
21	Donington Park GP, Leicestershire	25 min	18–19 September	
22	Donington Park GP, Leicestershire	50 min	18–19 September	
23	Snetterton Circuit, Norfolk	25 min	8–9 October	
24	Snetterton Circuit, Norfolk	50 min	8–9 October	
25	Snetterton Circuit, Norfolk	25 min	8–9 October	
26	Snetterton Circuit, Norfolk	50 min	8–9 October	

== Teams and drivers ==
Classes:

Class	Notes
Group GTO	Open specification (GT2, GTE, modified) cars
Group GT3	Homologated GT3 cars
Group GTA	Lower spec, challenge cars
Group GTB	Early year challenge and cup cars
Group GTC	Later year challenge and cup cars
Group GTH	Homologated GT4 cars

Team	Car	Engine	No.	Drivers	Rounds
GTO
(United Kingdom) CTR Developments	Porsche 935	Porsche 3.0 L KKK Flat-6	5	(United Kingdom) Richard Chamberlain	1–12, 15–18
(United Kingdom) RAW Motorsport	Radical RXC GT3	Ford EcoBoost 3.5 L V6	7	(United Kingdom) Steve Burgess	1–18
(United Kingdom) RAW Motorsport	Radical RXC GT3	Ford EcoBoost 3.5 L V6	7	(United Kingdom) Ben Dimmack	1–14
(United Kingdom) SB Race Engineering	McLaren MP4-12C GT3 Cam Am	McLaren M838T 3.8 L Turbo V8	28	(United Kingdom) Paul Bailey	1–4, 7–8
(United Kingdom) SB Race Engineering	McLaren MP4-12C GT3 Cam Am	McLaren M838T 3.8 L Turbo V8	28	(United Kingdom) Ross Wylie	1–4, 7–8
(United Kingdom) SB Race Engineering	Brabham BT62 Competition	Ford Modular 5.4 L V8	28	(United Kingdom) Paul Bailey	5–6
(United Kingdom) SB Race Engineering	Brabham BT62 Competition	Ford Modular 5.4 L V8	28	(United Kingdom) Ross Wylie	5–6
(United Kingdom) Simpson Motorsport	MARC II V8	Ford Modular 5.2 L V8	38	(United Kingdom) Sacha Kakad	1–4
(United Kingdom) Simpson Motorsport	MARC II V8	Ford Modular 5.2 L V8	38	(United Kingdom) James Kaye	1–4
GT3
(United Kingdom) Tecserv UK	Mercedes-AMG GT3 Evo	Mercedes-AMG M159 6.2 L V8	4	(United Kingdom) Grahame Tilley	All
(United Kingdom) Tecserv UK	Mercedes-AMG GT3 Evo	Mercedes-AMG M159 6.2 L V8	4	(United Kingdom) Will Tregurtha	All
(United Kingdom) Team ABBA Racing	Mercedes-AMG GT3	Mercedes-AMG M159 6.2 L V8	8	(United Kingdom) Richard Neary	1–4
(United Kingdom) Team ABBA Racing	Mercedes-AMG GT3	Mercedes-AMG M159 6.2 L V8	8	(United Kingdom) Sam Neary	1–4
(United Kingdom) Ram Racing	Mercedes-AMG GT3 Evo	Mercedes-AMG M159 6.2 L V8	11	(United Kingdom) Callum MacLeod	All
(United Kingdom) Ram Racing	Mercedes-AMG GT3 Evo	Mercedes-AMG M159 6.2 L V8	11	(United Kingdom) Mike Price	All
(United Kingdom) Ram Racing	Mercedes-AMG GT3 Evo	Mercedes-AMG M159 6.2 L V8	16	(United Kingdom) Ian Loggie	1–12, 15–26
(United Kingdom) Greystone GT	Lamborghini Huracán GT3 Evo	Lamborghini 5.2 L V10	22	(United Kingdom) Jon Lancaster	19–26
(United Kingdom) Greystone GT	Lamborghini Huracán GT3 Evo	Lamborghini 5.2 L V10	22	(United Kingdom) Rich Mason	19–26
(United Kingdom) Greystone GT	McLaren 720S GT3	McLaren M840T 4.0 L Turbo V8	23	(United Kingdom) Iain Campbell	All
(United Kingdom) Greystone GT	McLaren 720S GT3	McLaren M840T 4.0 L Turbo V8	23	(United Kingdom) Oliver Webb	All
(United Kingdom) Greystone GT	McLaren 720S GT3	McLaren M840T 4.0 L Turbo V8	24	(Estonia) Andrey Borodin	1–4, 15–26
(United Kingdom) Greystone GT	McLaren 720S GT3	McLaren M840T 4.0 L Turbo V8	24	(United Kingdom) Ed Pead	1–4, 15–26
(United Kingdom) G-Cat Racing	Porsche 911 GT3 R	Porsche 4.0 L Flat-6	33	(United Kingdom) Greg Caton	1–4
(United Kingdom) G-Cat Racing	Porsche 911 GT3 R	Porsche 4.0 L Flat-6	33	(United Kingdom) Shamus Jennings	1–4
(United Kingdom) Cook Motorsport	Mercedes-AMG GT3	Mercedes-AMG M159 6.2 L V8	36	(United Kingdom) Hugo Cook	19–26
(United Kingdom) Paddock Motorsport	McLaren 720S GT3	McLaren M840T 4.0 L Turbo V8	44	(United Kingdom) Steve Ruston	1–4, 9–26
(United Kingdom) Paddock Motorsport	McLaren 720S GT3	McLaren M840T 4.0 L Turbo V8	44	(United Kingdom) John Whitehouse	1–4, 9–26
(United Kingdom) Scott Sport	Lamborghini Huracán GT3 Evo	Lamborghini 5.2 L V10	61	(Italy) Andrea Amici	1–12
(United Kingdom) Scott Sport	Lamborghini Huracán GT3 Evo	Lamborghini 5.2 L V10	61	(United Kingdom) John Dhillon	1–12
(United Kingdom) Enduro Motorsport	McLaren 720S GT3	McLaren M840T 4.0 L Turbo V8	66	(United Kingdom) Marcus Clutton	1–12, 15–26
(United Kingdom) Enduro Motorsport	McLaren 720S GT3	McLaren M840T 4.0 L Turbo V8	66	(United Kingdom) Morgan Tillbrook	1–12, 19–26
(United Kingdom) Enduro Motorsport	McLaren 720S GT3	McLaren M840T 4.0 L Turbo V8	66	(United Kingdom) Hugo Cook	15–18
(United Kingdom) Orange Racing powered by JMH	McLaren 720S GT3	McLaren M840T 4.0 L Turbo V8	67	(United Kingdom) Michael O'Brien	All
(United Kingdom) Orange Racing powered by JMH	McLaren 720S GT3	McLaren M840T 4.0 L Turbo V8	67	(United Kingdom) Simon Orange	All
(United Kingdom) 7TSIX	McLaren 720S GT3	McLaren M840T 4.0 L Turbo V8	76	(United Kingdom) Bradley Ellis	15–18
(United Kingdom) 7TSIX	McLaren 720S GT3	McLaren M840T 4.0 L Turbo V8	76	(Cyprus) Leo Loucas	15–18
GTA
(United Kingdom) Topcats Racing	Ginetta G55 Supercup	Ford Cyclone 3.7 L V6	3	(United Kingdom) Charlotte Birch	19–26
(United Kingdom) Topcats Racing	Ginetta G55 Supercup	Ford Cyclone 3.7 L V6	3	(United Kingdom) Sam Randon	19–26
(United Kingdom) JMH Automotive	Ginetta G55 Supercup	Ford Cyclone 3.7 L V6	63	(United Kingdom) Matthew Maxfield	15–22
(United Kingdom) JMH Automotive	Ginetta G55 Supercup	Ford Cyclone 3.7 L V6	63	(United States) Conor Flynn	15–18
GTB
(United Kingdom) Simpson Motorsport	BMW M3 GTR	BMW 4.0 L V8	12	(United Kingdom) Jason Garrett	5–8
(United Kingdom) Simpson Motorsport	BMW M3 GTR	BMW 4.0 L V8	12	(United Kingdom) Sacha Kakad	5–8
(United Kingdom) Saxon Motorsport	BMW 150 GTR	BMW 5.0 L V10	20	(United Kingdom) Tom Barrow	5–8, 15–22
(United Kingdom) CSC Racing	Ferrari 458 Challenge	Ferrari 4.5 L V8	62	(United Kingdom) John Saunders	15–18
(United Kingdom) CSC Racing	Ferrari 458 Challenge	Ferrari 4.5 L V8	62	(United Kingdom) Matt Spark	15–18
(United Kingdom) DMS Automotive	McLaren 570S GT4	McLaren 3.8 L Turbo V8	71	(United Kingdom) Matt Le Breton	15–18
(United Kingdom) DMS Automotive	McLaren 570S GT4	McLaren 3.8 L Turbo V8	71	(United Kingdom) Rob Young	15–18
(United Kingdom) Whitebridge Motorsport	BMW M3 GTR	BMW 4.0 L V8	72	(Republic of Ireland) Chris Murphy	19–26
(United Kingdom) Whitebridge Motorsport	BMW M3 GTR	BMW 4.0 L V8	72	(United Kingdom) Andy Schultz	19–22, 26
(United Kingdom) 24/7 Motorsport	Audi R8 LMS GT4 Evo	Audi 5.2 L V10	91	(United Kingdom) David Frankland	19–26
(United Kingdom) 24/7 Motorsport	Audi R8 LMS GT4 Evo	Audi 5.2 L V10	91	(Brazil) Adriano Medeiros	19–22
(United Kingdom) 24/7 Motorsport	Audi R8 LMS GT4 Evo	Audi 5.2 L V10	91	(United Kingdom) Grahame Tilley	23–26
(United Kingdom) Geoff Steel Racing	Solution-F TC 12	BMW 4.0 L V8	138	(United Kingdom) Sam Allpass	5–8
GTC
(United Kingdom) Topcats Racing with Hex.com	Lamborghini Huracán Super Trofeo Evo	Lamborghini 5.2 L V10	3	(United Kingdom) Charlotte Birch	1–14
(United Kingdom) Topcats Racing with Hex.com	Lamborghini Huracán Super Trofeo Evo	Lamborghini 5.2 L V10	3	(United Kingdom) Charlotte Gilbert	1–14
(United Kingdom) Topcats Racing with Hex.com	Lamborghini Huracán Super Trofeo Evo	Lamborghini 5.2 L V10	9	(United Kingdom) Jensen Lunn	All
(United Kingdom) Topcats Racing with Hex.com	Lamborghini Huracán Super Trofeo Evo	Lamborghini 5.2 L V10	9	(United Kingdom) Warren Gilbert	1–14
(United Kingdom) Topcats Racing with Hex.com	Lamborghini Huracán Super Trofeo Evo	Lamborghini 5.2 L V10	9	(United Kingdom) Charlotte Birch	15–18
(United Kingdom) Topcats Racing with Hex.com	Lamborghini Huracán Super Trofeo Evo	Lamborghini 5.2 L V10	9	(United Kingdom) Charlotte Gilbert	19–26
(United Kingdom) Century Motorsport	Ginetta G56 Supercup	GM LS3 6.2 L V8	6	(United Kingdom) James Kellett	1–8, 13–14, 19–22
(United Kingdom) Century Motorsport	Ginetta G56 Supercup	GM LS3 6.2 L V8	6	(United Kingdom) Alex Stevenson	1–8, 13–14, 19–22
(United Kingdom) Motus One Team HARD. Racing	Porsche 991 GT3 Cup II	Porsche 4.0 L Flat-6	10	(Republic of Ireland) Chris Murphy	1–4
(United Kingdom) Motus One Team HARD. Racing	Porsche 991 GT3 Cup II	Porsche 4.0 L Flat-6	10	(Malta) James Taylor	1–4
(United Kingdom) Team Webb	Lamborghini Huracán Super Trofeo	Lamborghini 5.2 L V10	13	(United Kingdom) James Webb	1–8, 15–22
(United Kingdom) Team Webb	Lamborghini Huracán Super Trofeo	Lamborghini 5.2 L V10	13	(United Kingdom) Tom Webb	1–8, 15–22
(United Kingdom) 24/7 Motorsport	Porsche 991 GT3 Cup II	Porsche 4.0 L Flat-6	42	(United Kingdom) Adrian Watt	5–8, 15–18
(United Kingdom) FF Corse	Ferrari 488 Challenge Evo	Ferrari 3.9 L Twin-Turbo V8	56	(United Kingdom) Roy Millington	1–12, 15–22
(United Kingdom) FF Corse	Ferrari 488 Challenge Evo	Ferrari 3.9 L Twin-Turbo V8	56	(Denmark) Benny Simonsen	1–12, 15–22
(United Kingdom) Racelab	Ferrari 488 Challenge Evo 14; Lamborghini Huracán Super Trofeo EVO 2 4	Ferrari 3.9 L Twin-Turbo V8 14; Lamborghini 5.2 L V10 4	247	(United Kingdom) Lucky Khera	1–18
(United Kingdom) Racelab	Ferrari 488 Challenge Evo 14; Lamborghini Huracán Super Trofeo EVO 2 4	Ferrari 3.9 L Twin-Turbo V8 14; Lamborghini 5.2 L V10 4	247	(United Kingdom) David McDonald	1–4, 6–8, 13–18
GTH
(United Kingdom) Abba Racing	Mercedes-AMG GT4	Mercedes-AMG M178 4.0 L V8	8	(United Kingdom) Ed McDermott	19–22
(United Kingdom) Abba Racing	Mercedes-AMG GT4	Mercedes-AMG M178 4.0 L V8	8	(United Kingdom) Sam Neary	19–22
(United Kingdom) Motus One Team HARD. Racing	Ginetta G55 GT4	Ford Cyclone 3.7 L V6	10	(United Kingdom) Callum Jenkins	5–8
(United Kingdom) Motus One Team HARD. Racing	Ginetta G55 GT4	Ford Cyclone 3.7 L V6	10	(United Kingdom) Danny Krywyj	5–8
(United Kingdom) Greystone GT	McLaren 570S GT4	McLaren 3.8 L Turbo V8	14	(United Kingdom) Michael Broadhurst	All
(United Kingdom) Greystone GT	McLaren 570S GT4	McLaren 3.8 L Turbo V8	14	(United Kingdom) Phil Carter	All
(United Kingdom) Greystone GT	McLaren 570S GT4	McLaren 3.8 L Turbo V8	77	(United Kingdom) Euan Hankey	All
(United Kingdom) Greystone GT	McLaren 570S GT4	McLaren 3.8 L Turbo V8	77	(United Kingdom) Mark Hopton	All
(United Kingdom) Greystone GT	McLaren 570S GT4	McLaren 3.8 L Turbo V8	80	(United Kingdom) Jon Lancaster	1–12, 15–18
(United Kingdom) Greystone GT	McLaren 570S GT4	McLaren 3.8 L Turbo V8	80	(United States) Ron Trenka	1–12, 15–18
(United Kingdom) Orange Racing powered by JMH	McLaren 570S GT4	McLaren 3.8 L Turbo V8	17	(United Kingdom) Will Dendy	All
(United Kingdom) Orange Racing powered by JMH	McLaren 570S GT4	McLaren 3.8 L Turbo V8	17	(United Kingdom) Patrick Collins	1–14, 17–26
(United Kingdom) Orange Racing powered by JMH	McLaren 570S GT4	McLaren 3.8 L Turbo V8	17	(United Kingdom) Russell Lindsay	1–14
(United Kingdom) Orange Racing powered by JMH	McLaren 570S GT4	McLaren 3.8 L Turbo V8	17	(United Kingdom) Matt Le Breton	15
(United Kingdom) Paddock Motorsport (United Kingdom) Top Gear	McLaren 570S GT4	McLaren 3.8 L Turbo V8	25	(United Kingdom) Adam Hatfield	1–18, 19–26
(United Kingdom) Paddock Motorsport (United Kingdom) Top Gear	McLaren 570S GT4	McLaren 3.8 L Turbo V8	25	(United Kingdom) Kavi Jundu	1–18, 19–26
(United Kingdom) Paddock Motorsport (United Kingdom) Top Gear	McLaren 570S GT4	McLaren 3.8 L Turbo V8	25	(United Kingdom) Ollie Hall	19–22
(United Kingdom) Paddock Motorsport (United Kingdom) Top Gear	McLaren 570S GT4	McLaren 3.8 L Turbo V8	25	(United Kingdom) Louis Smithen	19–22
(United Kingdom) Paddock Motorsport (United Kingdom) Top Gear	McLaren 570S GT4	McLaren 3.8 L Turbo V8	26	(United Kingdom) Tehmur Chohan	All
(United Kingdom) Paddock Motorsport (United Kingdom) Top Gear	McLaren 570S GT4	McLaren 3.8 L Turbo V8	26	(United Kingdom) Tom Roche	1–8, 13–26
(United Kingdom) Paddock Motorsport (United Kingdom) Top Gear	McLaren 570S GT4	McLaren 3.8 L Turbo V8	26	(United Kingdom) Moh Ritson	9–12
(United Kingdom) Make Happen Racing	Ginetta G55 GT4	Ford Cyclone 3.7 L V6	30	(United Kingdom) Neil Burroughs	1–4
(United Kingdom) Make Happen Racing	Ginetta G55 GT4	Ford Cyclone 3.7 L V6	30	(United Kingdom) Greg Evans	1–4
(United Kingdom) Make Happen Racing	Mercedes-AMG GT4	Mercedes-AMG M178 4.0 L V8	69	(United Kingdom) Chris Hart	All
(United Kingdom) Make Happen Racing	Mercedes-AMG GT4	Mercedes-AMG M178 4.0 L V8	69	(United Kingdom) Stephen Walton	All
(United Kingdom) Make Happen Racing	Mercedes-AMG GT4	Mercedes-AMG M178 4.0 L V8	96	(United Kingdom) Jon Currie	1–18, 23–26
(United Kingdom) Make Happen Racing	Mercedes-AMG GT4	Mercedes-AMG M178 4.0 L V8	96	(United Kingdom) Phil Keen	23–26
(United Kingdom) Track Focused	Mercedes-AMG GT4	Mercedes-AMG M178 4.0 L V8	39	(United Kingdom) Darren Kell	1–8, 15–26
(United Kingdom) Track Focused	Mercedes-AMG GT4	Mercedes-AMG M178 4.0 L V8	39	(United Kingdom) James Kell	1–8, 15–26
(United Kingdom) Valluga Racing	Porsche 718 Cayman GT4 RS Clubsport	Porsche 4.0 L Flat-6	50	(United Kingdom) Sam Maher-Loughnan	All
(United Kingdom) Valluga Racing	Porsche 718 Cayman GT4 RS Clubsport	Porsche 4.0 L Flat-6	50	(United Kingdom) James Wallis	All
(United Kingdom) Valluga Racing	Porsche 718 Cayman GT4 Clubsport	Porsche 4.0 L Flat-6	51	(Republic of Ireland) Cameron Fenton	1–4
(United Kingdom) Valluga Racing	Porsche 718 Cayman GT4 Clubsport	Porsche 4.0 L Flat-6	51	(United Kingdom) Neil MacLennan	1–4
(United Kingdom) Valluga Racing	Porsche 718 Cayman GT4 Clubsport	Porsche 4.0 L Flat-6	51	(United Kingdom) Benji Hetherington	5–8
(United Kingdom) Valluga Racing	Porsche 718 Cayman GT4 Clubsport	Porsche 4.0 L Flat-6	51	(United Kingdom) Matthew Graham	5–8
(United Kingdom) Valluga Racing	Porsche 718 Cayman GT4 Clubsport	Porsche 4.0 L Flat-6	51	(United Kingdom) Charlie Hollings	15–18
(United Kingdom) Valluga Racing	Porsche 718 Cayman GT4 Clubsport	Porsche 4.0 L Flat-6	51	(Cyprus) Rhea Loucas	15–18
(United Kingdom) Valluga Racing	Porsche 718 Cayman GT4 Clubsport	Porsche 4.0 L Flat-6	52	(United Kingdom) Chris Bates	1–8
(United Kingdom) Valluga Racing	Porsche 718 Cayman GT4 Clubsport	Porsche 4.0 L Flat-6	52	(United Kingdom) Darren Burke	1–8
(United Kingdom) Vector Racing	Aston Martin Vantage AMR GT4	Aston Martin 4.0 L Turbo V8	57	(Australia) Peter Jackson	1–4
(United Kingdom) Formula Women	McLaren 570S GT4	McLaren 3.8 L Turbo V8	64	(Canada) Erika Hoffman	9–18
(United Kingdom) Formula Women	McLaren 570S GT4	McLaren 3.8 L Turbo V8	64	(United Kingdom) Jodie Sloss	9–18
(United Kingdom) Formula Women	McLaren 570S GT4	McLaren 3.8 L Turbo V8	65	(Jamaica) Sara Misir	9–18
(United Kingdom) Formula Women	McLaren 570S GT4	McLaren 3.8 L Turbo V8	65	(United Kingdom) Steph Sore	9–18
(United Kingdom) Fox Motorsport	McLaren 570S GT4	McLaren 3.8 L Turbo V8	78	(United Kingdom) Jordan Albert	1–8
(United Kingdom) Fox Motorsport	McLaren 570S GT4	McLaren 3.8 L Turbo V8	78	(United Kingdom) Tim Docker	1–8
(United Kingdom) Caffeine Six by Parr Motorsport	Porsche 718 Cayman GT4 Clubsport	Porsche 4.0 L Flat-6	86	(United Kingdom) Tim Creswick	5–26
(United Kingdom) Caffeine Six by Parr Motorsport	Porsche 718 Cayman GT4 Clubsport	Porsche 4.0 L Flat-6	86	(United Kingdom) Chris Dymond	5–22
(United Kingdom) 24/7 Motorsport	Audi R8 LMS GT4 Evo	Audi 5.2 L V10	91	(United Kingdom) David Frankland	1–4, 15–18
(United Kingdom) 24/7 Motorsport	Audi R8 LMS GT4 Evo	Audi 5.2 L V10	91	(Brazil) Adriano Medeiros	1–4, 15–18

== Race calendar and results ==
**Bold** indicates the overall winner.

Round		Circuit	Date	Pole position	GTO Winners	GT3 Winners	GTA Winners	GTB Winners	GTC Winners	GTH Winners
1	R1	(United Kingdom) Donington Park	9 April	(United Kingdom) No. 16 Ram Racing	(United Kingdom) No. 7 RAW Motorsport	**(United Kingdom) No. 16 Ram Racing**	No Entries	No Entries	(United Kingdom) No. 247 Racelab	(United Kingdom) No. 69 Make Happen Racing
1	R1	(United Kingdom) Donington Park	9 April	(United Kingdom) Ian Loggie	(United Kingdom) Steve Burgess (United Kingdom) Ben Dimmack	**(United Kingdom) Ian Loggie**	No Entries	No Entries	(United Kingdom) Lucky Khera (United Kingdom) David McDonald	(United Kingdom) Chris Hart (United Kingdom) Stephen Walton
1	R2	(United Kingdom) Donington Park	9 April	(United Kingdom) No. 8 Team ABBA Racing	(United Kingdom) No. 7 RAW Motorsport	**(United Kingdom) No. 66 Enduro Motorsport**	No Entries	No Entries	(United Kingdom) No. 247 Racelab	(United Kingdom) No. 50 Valluga Racing
1	R2	(United Kingdom) Donington Park	9 April	(United Kingdom) Richard Neary (United Kingdom) Sam Neary	(United Kingdom) Steve Burgess (United Kingdom) Ben Dimmack	**(United Kingdom) Marcus Clutton** **(United Kingdom) Morgan Tillbrook**	No Entries	No Entries	(United Kingdom) Lucky Khera (United Kingdom) David McDonald	(United Kingdom) Sam Maher-Loughnan (United Kingdom) James Wallis
1	R3	(United Kingdom) Donington Park	10 April	(United Kingdom) No. 16 Ram Racing	(United Kingdom) No. 7 RAW Motorsport	**(United Kingdom) No. 67 Orange Racing powered by JMH**	No Entries	No Entries	(United Kingdom) No. 247 Racelab	(United Kingdom) No. 39 Track Focused
1	R3	(United Kingdom) Donington Park	10 April	(United Kingdom) Ian Loggie	(United Kingdom) Steve Burgess (United Kingdom) Ben Dimmack	**(United Kingdom) Michael O'Brien** **(United Kingdom) Simon Orange**	No Entries	No Entries	(United Kingdom) Lucky Khera (United Kingdom) David McDonald	(United Kingdom) Darren Kell (United Kingdom) James Kell
1	R4	(United Kingdom) Donington Park	10 April	(United Kingdom) No. 67 Orange Racing powered by JMH	(United Kingdom) No. 7 RAW Motorsport	**(United Kingdom) No. 23 Greystone GT**	No Entries	No Entries	(United Kingdom) No. 56 FF Corse	(United Kingdom) No. 69 Make Happen Racing
1	R4	(United Kingdom) Donington Park	10 April	(United Kingdom) Michael O'Brien (United Kingdom) Simon Orange	(United Kingdom) Steve Burgess (United Kingdom) Ben Dimmack	**(United Kingdom) Iain Campbell** **(United Kingdom) Oliver Webb**	No Entries	No Entries	(United Kingdom) Roy Millington (Denmark) Benny Simonsen	(United Kingdom) Chris Hart (United Kingdom) Stephen Walton
2	R5	(United Kingdom) Brands Hatch	30 April	(United Kingdom) No. 66 Enduro Motorsport	**(United Kingdom) No. 7 RAW Motorsport**	(United Kingdom) No. 66 Enduro Motorsport	No Entries	(United Kingdom) No. 20 Saxon Motorsport	(United Kingdom) No. 247 Racelab	(United Kingdom) No. 51 Valluga Racing
2	R5	(United Kingdom) Brands Hatch	30 April	(United Kingdom) Marcus Clutton (United Kingdom) Morgan Tillbrook	**(United Kingdom) Steve Burgess** **(United Kingdom) Ben Dimmack**	(United Kingdom) Marcus Clutton (United Kingdom) Morgan Tillbrook	No Entries	(United Kingdom) Tom Barrow	(United Kingdom) Lucky Khera	(United Kingdom) Matthew Graham (United Kingdom) Benji Hetherington
2	R6	(United Kingdom) Brands Hatch	30 April	(United Kingdom) No. 67 Orange Racing powered by JMH	(United Kingdom) No. 7 RAW Motorsport	**(United Kingdom) No. 67 Orange Racing powered by JMH**	No Entries	No Finishers	(United Kingdom) No. 9 Topcats Racing with Hex.com	(United Kingdom) No. 50 Valluga Racing
2	R6	(United Kingdom) Brands Hatch	30 April	(United Kingdom) Michael O'Brien (United Kingdom) Simon Orange	(United Kingdom) Steve Burgess (United Kingdom) Ben Dimmack	**(United Kingdom) Michael O'Brien** **(United Kingdom) Simon Orange**	No Entries	No Finishers	(United Kingdom) Warren Gilbert (United Kingdom) Jensen Lunn	(United Kingdom) Sam Maher-Loughnan (United Kingdom) James Wallis
2	R7	(United Kingdom) Brands Hatch	1 May	(United Kingdom) No. 66 Enduro Motorsport	(United Kingdom) No. 7 RAW Motorsport	**(United Kingdom) No. 66 Enduro Motorsport**	No Entries	(United Kingdom) No. 20 Saxon Motorsport	(United Kingdom) No. 247 Racelab	(United Kingdom) No. 50 Valluga Racing
2	R7	(United Kingdom) Brands Hatch	1 May	(United Kingdom) Marcus Clutton (United Kingdom) Morgan Tillbrook	(United Kingdom) Steve Burgess (United Kingdom) Ben Dimmack	**(United Kingdom) Marcus Clutton** **(United Kingdom) Morgan Tillbrook**	No Entries	(United Kingdom) Tom Barrow	(United Kingdom) Lucky Khera (United Kingdom) David McDonald	(United Kingdom) Sam Maher-Loughnan (United Kingdom) James Wallis
2	R8	(United Kingdom) Brands Hatch	1 May	(United Kingdom) No. 67 Orange Racing powered by JMH	(United Kingdom) No. 28 SB Race Engineering	**(United Kingdom) No. 61 Scott Sport**	No Entries	(United Kingdom) No. 20 Saxon Motorsport	(United Kingdom) No. 247 Racelab	(United Kingdom) No. 77 Greystone GT
2	R8	(United Kingdom) Brands Hatch	1 May	(United Kingdom) Michael O'Brien (United Kingdom) Simon Orange	(United Kingdom) Paul Bailey (United Kingdom) Ross Wylie	**(Italy) Andrea Amici** **(United Kingdom) John Dhillon**	No Entries	(United Kingdom) Tom Barrow	(United Kingdom) Lucky Khera (United Kingdom) David McDonald	(United Kingdom) Euan Hankey (United Kingdom) Mark Hopton
3	R9	(United Kingdom) Snetterton	11 June	(United Kingdom) No. 66 Enduro Motorsport	(United Kingdom) No. 5 CTR Developments	**(United Kingdom) No. 66 Enduro Motorsport**	No Entries	No Entries	(United Kingdom) No. 9 Topcats Racing with Hex.com	(United Kingdom) No. 17 Orange Racing powered by JMH
3	R9	(United Kingdom) Snetterton	11 June	(United Kingdom) Marcus Clutton (United Kingdom) Morgan Tillbrook	(United Kingdom) Richard Chamberlain	**(United Kingdom) Marcus Clutton** **(United Kingdom) Morgan Tillbrook**	No Entries	No Entries	(United Kingdom) Warren Gilbert (United Kingdom) Jensen Lunn	(United Kingdom) Patrick Collins (United Kingdom) Russell Lindsay
3	R10	(United Kingdom) Snetterton	11 June	(United Kingdom) No. 67 Orange Racing powered by JMH	(United Kingdom) No. 7 RAW Motorsport	**(United Kingdom) No. 67 Orange Racing powered by JMH**	No Entries	No Entries	(United Kingdom) No. 9 Topcats Racing with Hex.com	(United Kingdom) No. 50 Valluga Racing
3	R10	(United Kingdom) Snetterton	11 June	(United Kingdom) Michael O'Brien (United Kingdom) Simon Orange	(United Kingdom) Steve Burgess (United Kingdom) Ben Dimmack	**(United Kingdom) Michael O'Brien** **(United Kingdom) Simon Orange**	No Entries	No Entries	(United Kingdom) Warren Gilbert (United Kingdom) Jensen Lunn	(United Kingdom) Sam Maher-Loughnan (United Kingdom) James Wallis
3	R11	(United Kingdom) Snetterton	12 June	(United Kingdom) No. 16 Ram Racing	(United Kingdom) No. 7 RAW Motorsport	**(United Kingdom) No. 16 Ram Racing**	No Entries	No Entries	(United Kingdom) No. 247 Racelab	(United Kingdom) No. 69 Make Happen Racing
3	R11	(United Kingdom) Snetterton	12 June	(United Kingdom) Ian Loggie	(United Kingdom) Steve Burgess (United Kingdom) Ben Dimmack	**(United Kingdom) Ian Loggie**	No Entries	No Entries	(United Kingdom) Lucky Khera	(United Kingdom) Chris Hart (United Kingdom) Stephen Walton
3	R12	(United Kingdom) Snetterton	12 June	(United Kingdom) No. 16 Ram Racing	(United Kingdom) No. 7 RAW Motorsport	**(United Kingdom) No. 11 Ram Racing**	No Entries	No Entries	(United Kingdom) No. 247 Racelab	(United Kingdom) No. 25 Paddock Motorsport
3	R12	(United Kingdom) Snetterton	12 June	(United Kingdom) Ian Loggie	(United Kingdom) Steve Burgess (United Kingdom) Ben Dimmack	**(United Kingdom) Callum MacLeod** **(United Kingdom) Mike Price**	No Entries	No Entries	(United Kingdom) Lucky Khera	(United Kingdom) Adam Hatfield (United Kingdom) Kavi Jundu
4	R13	(United Kingdom) Oulton Park	9 July	(United Kingdom) No. 67 Orange Racing powered by JMH	No Finishers	**(United Kingdom) No. 23 Greystone GT**	No Entries	No Entries	(United Kingdom) No. 9 Topcats Racing with Hex.com	(United Kingdom) No. 17 Orange Racing powered by JMH
4	R13	(United Kingdom) Oulton Park	9 July	(United Kingdom) Michael O'Brien (United Kingdom) Simon Orange	No Finishers	**(United Kingdom) Iain Campbell** **(United Kingdom) Oliver Webb**	No Entries	No Entries	(United Kingdom) Warren Gilbert (United Kingdom) Jensen Lunn	(United Kingdom) Patrick Collins (United Kingdom) Will Dendy (United Kingdom) Russell Lindsay
4	R14	(United Kingdom) Oulton Park	9 July	(United Kingdom) No. 67 Orange Racing powered by JMH	No Starters	**(United Kingdom) No. 11 Ram Racing**	No Entries	No Entries	(United Kingdom) No. 247 Racelab	(United Kingdom) No. 50 Valluga Racing
4	R14	(United Kingdom) Oulton Park	9 July	(United Kingdom) Michael O'Brien (United Kingdom) Simon Orange	No Starters	**(United Kingdom) Callum MacLeod** **(United Kingdom) Mike Price**	No Entries	No Entries	(United Kingdom) Lucky Khera (United Kingdom) David McDonald	(United Kingdom) Sam Maher-Loughnan (United Kingdom) James Wallis
5	R15	(United Kingdom) Silverstone	30 July	(United Kingdom) No. 16 Ram Racing	**(United Kingdom) No. 7 RAW Motorsport**	(United Kingdom) No. 66 Enduro Motorsport	(United Kingdom) No. 63 JMH Automotive	(United Kingdom) No. 20 Saxon Motorsport	(United Kingdom) No. 9 Topcats Racing with Hex.com	(United Kingdom) No. 50 Valluga Racing
5	R15	(United Kingdom) Silverstone	30 July	(United Kingdom) Ian Loggie	**(United Kingdom) Steve Burgess**	(United Kingdom) Hugo Cook (United Kingdom) Marcus Clutton	(United Kingdom) Matthew Maxfield (United States) Conor Flynn	(United Kingdom) Tom Barrow	(United Kingdom) Charlotte Birch (United Kingdom) Jensen Lunn	(United Kingdom) Sam Maher-Loughnan (United Kingdom) James Wallis
5	R16	(United Kingdom) Silverstone	30 July	(United Kingdom) No. 66 Enduro Motorsport	(United Kingdom) No. 7 RAW Motorsport	**(United Kingdom) No. 66 Enduro Motorsport**	(United Kingdom) No. 63 JMH Automotive	(United Kingdom) No. 20 Saxon Motorsport	(United Kingdom) No. 56 FF Corse	(United Kingdom) No. 77 Greystone GT
5	R16	(United Kingdom) Silverstone	30 July	(United Kingdom) Hugo Cook (United Kingdom) Marcus Clutton	(United Kingdom) Steve Burgess	**(United Kingdom) Hugo Cook** **(United Kingdom) Marcus Clutton**	(United States) Conor Flynn (United Kingdom) Matthew Maxfield	(United Kingdom) Tom Barrow	(United Kingdom) Roy Millington (Denmark) Benny Simonsen	(United Kingdom) Euan Hankey (United Kingdom) Mark Hopton
5	R17	(United Kingdom) Silverstone	31 July	(United Kingdom) No. 7 RAW Motorsport	(United Kingdom) No. 7 RAW Motorsport	**(United Kingdom) No. 67 Orange Racing powered by JMH**	(United Kingdom) No. 63 JMH Automotive	(United Kingdom) No. 20 Saxon Motorsport	(United Kingdom) No. 247 Racelab	(United Kingdom) No. 26 Paddock Motorsport
5	R17	(United Kingdom) Silverstone	31 July	(United Kingdom) Steve Burgess	(United Kingdom) Steve Burgess	**(United Kingdom) Michael O'Brien** **(United Kingdom) Simon Orange**	(United States) Conor Flynn (United Kingdom) Matthew Maxfield	(United Kingdom) Tom Barrow	(United Kingdom) Lucky Khera (United Kingdom) David McDonald	(United Kingdom) Tehmur Chohan (United Kingdom) Tom Roche
5	R18	(United Kingdom) Silverstone	31 July	(United Kingdom) No. 7 RAW Motorsport	(United Kingdom) No. 7 RAW Motorsport	**(United Kingdom) No. 67 Orange Racing powered by JMH**	No Finishers	(United Kingdom) No. 20 Saxon Motorsport	(United Kingdom) No. 247 Racelab	(United Kingdom) No. 26 Paddock Motorsport
5	R18	(United Kingdom) Silverstone	31 July	(United Kingdom) Steve Burgess	(United Kingdom) Steve Burgess	**(United Kingdom) Michael O'Brien** **(United Kingdom) Simon Orange**	No Finishers	(United Kingdom) Tom Barrow	(United Kingdom) Lucky Khera (United Kingdom) David McDonald	(United Kingdom) Tehmur Chohan (United Kingdom) Tom Roche
6	R19	(United Kingdom) Donington Park	18 September	(United Kingdom) No. 66 Enduro Motorsport	No Entries	**(United Kingdom) No. 66 Enduro Motorsport**	(United Kingdom) No. 3 Topcats Racing	(United Kingdom) No. 20 Saxon Motorsport	(United Kingdom) No. 9 Topcats Racing with Hex.com	(United Kingdom) No. 17 Orange Racing powered by JMH
6	R19	(United Kingdom) Donington Park	18 September	(United Kingdom) Marcus Clutton (United Kingdom) Morgan Tillbrook	No Entries	**(United Kingdom) Marcus Clutton** **(United Kingdom) Morgan Tillbrook**	(United Kingdom) Charlotte Birch (United Kingdom) Sam Randon	(United Kingdom) Tom Barrow	(United Kingdom) Charlotte Gilbert (United Kingdom) Jensen Lunn	(United Kingdom) Patrick Collins (United Kingdom) Will Dendy
6	R20	(United Kingdom) Donington Park	18 September	(United Kingdom) No. 36 Cook Motorsport	No Entries	**(United Kingdom) No. 66 Enduro Motorsport**	(United Kingdom) No. 3 Topcats Racing	(United Kingdom) No. 91 24-7 Motorsport	(United Kingdom) No. 9 Topcats Racing with Hex.com	(United Kingdom) No. 77 Greystone GT
6	R20	(United Kingdom) Donington Park	18 September	(United Kingdom) Hugo Cook	No Entries	**(United Kingdom) Morgan Tillbrook** **(United Kingdom) Marcus Clutton**	(United Kingdom) Charlotte Birch (United Kingdom) Sam Randon	(United Kingdom) David Frankland (Brazil) Adriano Medeiros	(United Kingdom) Charlotte Gilbert (United Kingdom) Jensen Lunn	(United Kingdom) Mark Hopton (United Kingdom) Euan Hankey
6	R21	(United Kingdom) Donington Park	19 September	(United Kingdom) No. 66 Enduro Motorsport	No Entries	**(United Kingdom) No. 66 Enduro Motorsport**	(United Kingdom) No. 3 Topcats Racing	(United Kingdom) No. 72 Whitebridge Motorsport	(United Kingdom) No. 13 Team Webb	(United Kingdom) No. 39 Track Focused
6	R21	(United Kingdom) Donington Park	19 September	(United Kingdom) Morgan Tillbrook (United Kingdom) Marcus Clutton	No Entries	**(United Kingdom) Morgan Tillbrook** **(United Kingdom) Marcus Clutton**	(United Kingdom) Charlotte Birch (United Kingdom) Sam Randon	(Republic of Ireland) Chris Murphy (United Kingdom) Andy Schultz	(United Kingdom) James Webb (United Kingdom) Tom Webb	(United Kingdom) Darren Kell (United Kingdom) James Kell
6	R22	(United Kingdom) Donington Park	19 September	(United Kingdom) No. 66 Enduro Motorsport	No Entries	**(United Kingdom) No. 67 Orange Racing powered by JMH**	(United Kingdom) No. 3 Topcats Racing	No Finishers	(United Kingdom) No. 13 Team Webb	(United Kingdom) No. 17 Orange Racing powered by JMH
6	R22	(United Kingdom) Donington Park	19 September	(United Kingdom) Morgan Tillbrook (United Kingdom) Marcus Clutton	No Entries	**(United Kingdom) Simon Orange** **(United Kingdom) Michael O'Brien**	(United Kingdom) Charlotte Birch (United Kingdom) Sam Randon	No Finishers	(United Kingdom) James Webb (United Kingdom) Tom Webb	(United Kingdom) Patrick Collins (United Kingdom) Will Dendy
7	R23	(United Kingdom) Snetterton	8 October	(United Kingdom) No. 36 Cook Motorsport	No Entries	**(United Kingdom) No. 67 Orange Racing powered by JMH**	(United Kingdom) No. 3 Topcats Racing	(United Kingdom) No. 72 Whitebridge Motorsport	(United Kingdom) No. 9 Topcats Racing with Hex.com	(United Kingdom) No. 17 Orange Racing powered by JMH
7	R23	(United Kingdom) Snetterton	8 October	(United Kingdom) Hugo Cook	No Entries	**(United Kingdom) Michael O'Brien** **(United Kingdom) Simon Orange**	(United Kingdom) Charlotte Birch (United Kingdom) Sam Randon	(Republic of Ireland) Chris Murphy	(United Kingdom) Charlotte Gilbert (United Kingdom) Jensen Lunn	(United Kingdom) Patrick Collins (United Kingdom) Will Dendy
7	R24	(United Kingdom) Snetterton	8 October	(United Kingdom) No. 36 Cook Motorsport	No Entries	**(United Kingdom) No. 66 Enduro Motorsport**	(United Kingdom) No. 3 Topcats Racing	(United Kingdom) No. 72 Whitebridge Motorsport	(United Kingdom) No. 9 Topcats Racing with Hex.com	(United Kingdom) No. 50 Valluga Racing
7	R24	(United Kingdom) Snetterton	8 October	(United Kingdom) Hugo Cook	No Entries	**(United Kingdom) Marcus Clutton** **(United Kingdom) Morgan Tillbrook**	(United Kingdom) Charlotte Birch (United Kingdom) Sam Randon	(Republic of Ireland) Chris Murphy	(United Kingdom) Charlotte Gilbert (United Kingdom) Jensen Lunn	(United Kingdom) Sam Maher-Loughnan (United Kingdom) James Wallis
7	R25	(United Kingdom) Snetterton	9 October	(United Kingdom) No. 36 Cook Motorsport	No Entries	**(United Kingdom) No. 36 Cook Motorsport**	(United Kingdom) No. 3 Topcats Racing	(United Kingdom) No. 72 Whitebridge Motorsport	(United Kingdom) No. 9 Topcats Racing with Hex.com	(United Kingdom) No. 39 Track Focused
7	R25	(United Kingdom) Snetterton	9 October	(United Kingdom) Hugo Cook	No Entries	**(United Kingdom) Hugo Cook**	(United Kingdom) Charlotte Birch (United Kingdom) Sam Randon	(Republic of Ireland) Chris Murphy	(United Kingdom) Charlotte Gilbert (United Kingdom) Jensen Lunn	(United Kingdom) Darren Kell (United Kingdom) James Kell
7	R26	(United Kingdom) Snetterton	9 October	(United Kingdom) No. 36 Cook Motorsport	No Entries	**(United Kingdom) No. 36 Cook Motorsport**	(United Kingdom) No. 3 Topcats Racing	(United Kingdom) No. 72 Whitebridge Motorsport	(United Kingdom) No. 9 Topcats Racing with Hex.com	(United Kingdom) No. 17 Orange Racing powered by JMH
7	R26	(United Kingdom) Snetterton	9 October	(United Kingdom) Hugo Cook	No Entries	**(United Kingdom) Hugo Cook**	(United Kingdom) Charlotte Birch (United Kingdom) Sam Randon	(Republic of Ireland) Chris Murphy (United Kingdom) Andy Schultz	(United Kingdom) Charlotte Gilbert (United Kingdom) Jensen Lunn	(United Kingdom) Patrick Collins (United Kingdom) Will Dendy
