= 2024 GT4 Winter Series =

Multi-event motor racing championship

== Calendar ==
The calendar for the 2024 season was announced on the 26th March 2023. The 2024 GT4 Winter Series will run entirely on the Iberian Peninsula, with two races in Portugal, and four races in Spain.
At each circuit, the race weekend will consist of three races in total, two 30 minute races, and a single 60 minute race.

Round	Circuit	Date	Map of circuit locations
1	(Portugal) Circuito do Estoril, Estoril	13–14 January	2024 GT4 Winter Series (Iberia)
2	(Portugal) Algarve International Circuit, Portimão	20–21 January	2024 GT4 Winter Series (Iberia)
3	(Spain) Circuito de Jerez, Jerez de la Frontera	10–11 February	2024 GT4 Winter Series (Iberia)
4	(Spain) Circuit Ricardo Tormo, Cheste	17–18 February	2024 GT4 Winter Series (Iberia)
5	(Spain) MotorLand Aragón, Alcañiz	2–3 March	2024 GT4 Winter Series (Iberia)
6	(Spain) Circuit de Barcelona-Catalunya, Montmeló	9–10 March	2024 GT4 Winter Series (Iberia)

== Entry list ==
Entrant/Team	Car	No.	Drivers	Class	Rounds
(Portugal) Speedy Motorsport	BMW M4 GT4 (G82)	5	(Portugal) Luis Liberal	Am	1–2
(Germany) BWT Mücke Motorsport	Mercedes-AMG GT4	8	(Germany) Mattis Pluschkell	P	3
(Portugal) RACAR Motorsport	Aston Martin Vantage GT4 (2024)	9	(Brazil) Roberto Faria	P	1–2
(Portugal) RACAR Motorsport	Aston Martin Vantage GT4 (2024)	9	(France) Mathieu Martins	P	1–2
(Portugal) RACAR Motorsport	Aston Martin Vantage GT4 (2024)	9	(Portugal) Manuel Gião	P	TBC
(Spain) NM Racing Team	Mercedes-AMG GT4	10	(Switzerland) Max Huber	Am	All
(Spain) NM Racing Team	Mercedes-AMG GT4	15	(Spain) Alberto de Martin	Am	1–4, 6
(Spain) NM Racing Team	Mercedes-AMG GT4	15	(Spain) Nil Montserrat	Am	1–4, 6
(Spain) NM Racing Team	Mercedes-AMG GT4	16	(Spain) Lluc Ibáñez	P	6
(Spain) NM Racing Team	Mercedes-AMG GT4	16	(United States) Alexandre Papadopulos	P	6
(Spain) NM Racing Team	Mercedes-AMG GT4	36	(Spain) Gullermo Aso	PA	5
(Spain) NM Racing Team	Mercedes-AMG GT4	36	(United States) Alexandre Papadopulos	PA	5
(Germany) Schnitzelalm Racing	Mercedes-AMG GT4	11	(Germany) Joel Mesch	P	All
(Germany) Schnitzelalm Racing	Mercedes-AMG GT4	11	(Germany) Jay Mo Härtling	P	1
(Germany) Schnitzelalm Racing	Mercedes-AMG GT4	11	(Germany) Marcel Marchewicz	P	2–6
(Germany) SR Motorsport	Porsche 718 Cayman GT4 RS Clubsport	110	(Germany) Willi Kühne	CT	All
(Germany) SR Motorsport	Porsche 718 Cayman GT4 RS Clubsport	110	(Germany) Enrico Förderer	CT	All
(Germany) SR Motorsport	Porsche 718 Cayman GT4 RS Clubsport	111	(Germany) Michael Sander	CT	All
(Germany) SR Motorsport	Porsche 718 Cayman GT4 RS Clubsport	111	(Germany) Tim Neuser	CT	1, 5
(Germany) SR Motorsport	Porsche 718 Cayman GT4 RS Clubsport	111	(Germany) Thomas Rackl	CT	2–4
(United Kingdom) Forsetti Motorsport	Aston Martin Vantage GT4 (2024)	19	(United Arab Emirates) Jamie Day	P	All
(United Kingdom) Forsetti Motorsport	Aston Martin Vantage GT4 (2024)	19	(United Kingdom) Mikey Porter	P	All
(Austria) Wimmer Werk Motorsport	Porsche 718 Cayman GT4 RS Clubsport	22	Ivan Ekelchik	P	6
(Austria) Wimmer Werk Motorsport	Porsche 718 Cayman GT4 RS Clubsport	22	(Austria) Raphael Rennhofer	P	6
(Austria) Wimmer Werk Motorsport	Porsche 718 Cayman GT4 RS Clubsport	24	(Kazakhstan) Egor Khichin	PA	1–2, 5–6
(Austria) Wimmer Werk Motorsport	Porsche 718 Cayman GT4 RS Clubsport	24	Ivan Ekelchik	PA	1–2, 5
(Austria) Wimmer Werk Motorsport	Porsche 718 Cayman GT4 RS Clubsport	24	(United States) Nicholas Maloy	PA	6
(United Kingdom) Elite Motorsport	McLaren Artura GT4	27	(Republic of Ireland) Alex Denning	P	3
(United Kingdom) Elite Motorsport	McLaren Artura GT4	27	(United Kingdom) Tom Emson	P	3
(United Kingdom) Elite Motorsport	McLaren Artura GT4	78	(United Kingdom) Tom Lebbon	P	All
(United Kingdom) Elite Motorsport	McLaren Artura GT4	78	(United Kingdom) Zac Meakin	P	All
(Germany) W&S Motorsport	Porsche 718 Cayman GT4 RS Clubsport	31	(Czech Republic) Josef Knopp	PA	3, 6
(Germany) W&S Motorsport	Porsche 718 Cayman GT4 RS Clubsport	31	(Germany) Alexander Danzer	PA	3
(Germany) W&S Motorsport	Porsche 718 Cayman GT4 RS Clubsport	31	(Germany) Max Kronberg	PA	6
(Germany) ME-Motorsport	BMW M4 GT4 (G82)	33	(Germany) Linus Hahn	TBC	4
(Germany) ME-Motorsport	BMW M4 GT4 (G82)	33	(Germany) Thomi Rackl	TBC	4
(Germany) ME-Motorsport	BMW M4 GT4 (G82)	66	(Germany) Markus Michele	PA	4
(Germany) ME-Motorsport	BMW M4 GT4 (G82)	66	(Germany) Philip Wiskirchen	PA	4
(Germany) Speedworxx Automotive	Porsche 718 Cayman GT4 RS Clubsport	66	(Germany) Arne Hoffmeister	CT	2
(Germany) Speedworxx Automotive	Porsche 718 Cayman GT4 RS Clubsport	66	(Germany) Franz Linden	CT	2
(Germany) Speedworxx Automotive	Porsche 718 Cayman GT4 RS Clubsport	660	(Germany) Arne Hoffmeister	CT	4, 6
(Germany) Speedworxx Automotive	Porsche 718 Cayman GT4 RS Clubsport	660	(Germany) Franz Linden	CT	4, 6
(Austria) razoon - more than racing	Porsche 718 Cayman GT4 RS Clubsport	77	(Austria) Andreas Höfler	PA	1–2
(Austria) razoon - more than racing	Porsche 718 Cayman GT4 RS Clubsport	77	(Austria) Leo Pichler	PA	1–2
(Austria) razoon - more than racing	Porsche 718 Cayman GT4 RS Clubsport	77	(Austria) Daniel Drexel	P	5–6
(Austria) razoon - more than racing	Porsche 718 Cayman GT4 RS Clubsport	77	(Austria) Leo Pichler	P	6
(Austria) razoon - more than racing	BMW M4 GT4 (G82)	81	(Austria) Richard Wolf	Am	1–2, 4–5
(Austria) razoon - more than racing	BMW M4 GT4 (G82)	81	(Turkey) Önder Erdem	Am	1, 4
(Germany) CV Performance Group	Mercedes-AMG GT4	84	(United Arab Emirates) Alex Connor	P	5–6
(Germany) CV Performance Group	Mercedes-AMG GT4	84	(United Arab Emirates) Lachlan Robinson	P	5
(Germany) CV Performance Group	Mercedes-AMG GT4	84	(Czech Republic) Michal Makeš	P	6
(Germany) CV Performance Group	Mercedes-AMG GT4	85	(United Kingdom) Charles Dawson	PA	All
(Germany) CV Performance Group	Mercedes-AMG GT4	85	(Norway) Emil Gjerdrum	PA	All
(Germany) SRS Team Sorg Rennsport	Porsche 718 Cayman GT4 RS Clubsport	93	(Germany) Christian Coen	Am	4
(Germany) SRS Team Sorg Rennsport	Porsche 718 Cayman GT4 RS Clubsport	93	(Germany) Dennis Bohn	Am	6
(Germany) SRS Team Sorg Rennsport	Porsche 718 Cayman GT4 RS Clubsport	94	(Germany) Christian Coen	Am	5
(Germany) SRS Team Sorg Rennsport	Porsche 718 Cayman GT4 RS Clubsport	94	(Germany) Niklas Kalus	Am	5
(Germany) East-Racing Motorsport	Porsche 718 Cayman GT4 RS Clubsport	99	(Germany) Florian Bauer	Am	1, 3
(Germany) East-Racing Motorsport	Porsche 718 Cayman GT4 RS Clubsport	99	(Germany) Jan Niklas Sommershoff	Am	1
(Germany) East-Racing Motorsport	Porsche 718 Cayman GT4 RS Clubsport	99	(Germany) Manuel Lauck	PA	5
(Germany) East-Racing Motorsport	Porsche 718 Cayman GT4 RS Clubsport	99	(Germany) Jan Niklas Sommershoff	PA	5
(Germany) Hofor Racing by Bonk Motorsport	BMW M4 GT4 (G82)	127	(Germany) Michael Bonk	Am	2
(Germany) Hofor Racing by Bonk Motorsport	BMW M4 GT4 (G82)	127	(Switzerland) Martin Kroll	Am	2
(United Kingdom) Nigel Greensall Motorsport	Toyota GR Supra GT4	166	(United Kingdom) Harry Barton	PA	4
(United Kingdom) Nigel Greensall Motorsport	Toyota GR Supra GT4	166	(United Kingdom) Nigel Greensall	PA	4
(Germany) FK Performance Motorsport	BMW M4 GT4 (G82)	187	(New Zealand) Rianna O'Meara-Hunt	PA	2
(Germany) FK Performance Motorsport	BMW M4 GT4 (G82)	187	(Netherlands) Gianni Van de Craatz	PA	2
(Germany) Teichmann Racing	Audi R8 LMS GT4 Evo	823	(Germany) Pierre Lemmerz	Am	1
Entry Lists:

Icon	Class
P	Pro
PA	Pro-Am Cup
Am	Am Cup
CT	Cayman Trophy

== Race results ==
Bold indicates overall winner.

Event		Circuit	Date	Pro Winners	Pro-Am Winners	AM Winners	CT Winners	Report
1	1	(Portugal) Circuito do Estoril	13–14 January	**(United Kingdom) No. 19 Forsetti Motorsport**	(Austria) No. 77 razoon - more than racing	(Spain) No. 10 NM Racing Team	(Germany) No. 110 SR Motorsport	
1	1	(Portugal) Circuito do Estoril	13–14 January	**(United Arab Emirates) Jamie Day** **(United Kingdom) Mikey Porter**	(Austria) Leo Pichler	(Switzerland) Max Huber	(Germany) Willi Kühne (Germany) Enrico Förderer	
1	2	(Portugal) Circuito do Estoril	13–14 January	(United Kingdom) No. 78 Elite Motorsport	**(Austria) No. 77 razoon - more than racing**	(Portugal) No. 5 Speedy Motorsport	(Germany) No. 110 SR Motorsport	
1	2	(Portugal) Circuito do Estoril	13–14 January	(United Kingdom) Tom Lebbon (United Kingdom) Zac Meakin	**(Austria) Andreas Höfler** **(Austria) Leo Pichler**	(Portugal) Luis Liberal	(Germany) Willi Kühne (Germany) Enrico Förderer	
1	3	(Portugal) Circuito do Estoril	13–14 January	**(Germany) No. 11 Schnitzelalm Racing**	(Germany) No. 85 CV Performance Group	(Spain) No. 15 NM Racing Team	(Germany) No. 111 SR Motorsport	
1	3	(Portugal) Circuito do Estoril	13–14 January	**(Germany) Jay Mo Härtling** **(Germany) Joel Mesch**	(United Kingdom) Charles Dawson (Norway) Emil Gjerdrum	(Spain) Alberto de Martin (Spain) Nil Montserrat	(Germany) Michael Sander (Germany) Tim Neuser	
2	1	(Portugal) Algarve International Circuit	20–21 January	**(Germany) No. 11 Schnitzelalm Racing**	(Germany) No. 85 CV Performance Group	(Spain) No. 10 NM Racing Team	(Germany) No. 111 SR Motorsport	
2	1	(Portugal) Algarve International Circuit	20–21 January	**(Germany) Marcel Marchewicz** **(Germany) Joel Mesch**	(United Kingdom) Charles Dawson (Norway) Emil Gjerdrum	(Switzerland) Max Huber	(Germany) Michael Sander (Germany) Tim Neuser	
2	2	(Portugal) Algarve International Circuit	20–21 January	**(United Kingdom) No. 19 Forsetti Motorsport**	(Austria) No. 77 razoon - more than racing	(Spain) No. 15 NM Racing Team	(Germany) No. 110 SR Motorsport	
2	2	(Portugal) Algarve International Circuit	20–21 January	**(United Arab Emirates) Jamie Day** **(United Kingdom) Mikey Porter**	(Austria) Andreas Höfler (Austria) Leo Pichler	(Spain) Alberto de Martin (Spain) Nil Montserrat	(Germany) Willi Kühne (Germany) Enrico Förderer	
2	3	(Portugal) Algarve International Circuit	20–21 January	**(United Kingdom) No. 19 Forsetti Motorsport**	(Austria) No. 77 razoon - more than racing	(Spain) No. 15 NM Racing Team	(Germany) No. 66 Speedworxx Automotive	
2	3	(Portugal) Algarve International Circuit	20–21 January	**(United Arab Emirates) Jamie Day** **(United Kingdom) Mikey Porter**	(Austria) Andreas Höfler (Austria) Leo Pichler	(Spain) Alberto de Martin (Spain) Nil Montserrat	(Germany) Arne Hoffmeister (Germany) Franz Linden	
3	1	(Spain) Circuito de Jerez	10–11 February	**(United Kingdom) No. 19 Forsetti Motorsport**	(Germany) No. 85 CV Performance Group	(Spain) No. 15 NM Racing Team	(Germany) No. 111 SR Motorsport	
3	1	(Spain) Circuito de Jerez	10–11 February	**(United Arab Emirates) Jamie Day** **(United Kingdom) Mikey Porter**	(United Kingdom) Charles Dawson (Norway) Emil Gjerdrum	(Spain) Alberto de Martin (Spain) Nil Montserrat	(Germany) Michael Sander (Germany) Tim Neuser	
3	2	(Spain) Circuito de Jerez	10–11 February	(United Kingdom) No. 78 Elite Motorsport	**(Germany) No. 31 W&S Motorsport**	(Germany) No. 99 East-Racing Motorsport	(Germany) No. 110 SR Motorsport	
3	2	(Spain) Circuito de Jerez	10–11 February	(United Kingdom) Tom Lebbon (United Kingdom) Zac Meakin	**(Germany) Alexander Danzer** **(Czech Republic) Josef Knopp**	(Germany) Florian Bauer	(Germany) Willi Kühne (Germany) Enrico Förderer	
3	3	(Spain) Circuito de Jerez	10–11 February	**(United Kingdom) No. 78 Elite Motorsport**	(Germany) No. 31 W&S Motorsport	(Spain) No. 10 NM Racing Team	(Germany) No. 111 SR Motorsport	
3	3	(Spain) Circuito de Jerez	10–11 February	**(United Kingdom) Tom Lebbon** **(United Kingdom) Zac Meakin**	(Germany) Alexander Danzer (Czech Republic) Josef Knopp	(Switzerland) Max Huber	(Germany) Michael Sander (Germany) Tim Neuser	
4	1	(Spain) Circuit Ricardo Tormo	17–18 February	**(United Kingdom) No. 19 Forsetti Motorsport**	(United Kingdom) No. 166 Nigel Greensall Motorsport	(Spain) No. 10 NM Racing Team	(Germany) No. 111 SR Motorsport	
4	1	(Spain) Circuit Ricardo Tormo	17–18 February	**(United Arab Emirates) Jamie Day** **(United Kingdom) Mikey Porter**	(United Kingdom) Harry Barton (United Kingdom) Nigel Greensall	(Switzerland) Max Huber	(Germany) Michael Sander (Germany) Tim Neuser	
4	2	(Spain) Circuit Ricardo Tormo	17–18 February	**(Germany) No. 11 Schnitzelalm Racing**	(Germany) No. 66 ME-Motorsport	(Spain) No. 15 NM Racing Team	(Germany) No. 110 SR Motorsport	
4	2	(Spain) Circuit Ricardo Tormo	17–18 February	**(Germany) Marcel Marchewicz** **(Germany) Joel Mesch**	(Germany) Markus Michele (Germany) Philip Wiskirchen	(Spain) Alberto de Martin (Spain) Nil Montserrat	(Germany) Willi Kühne (Germany) Enrico Förderer	
4	3	(Spain) Circuit Ricardo Tormo	17–18 February	**(United Kingdom) No. 78 Elite Motorsport**	(Germany) No. 66 ME-Motorsport	(Spain) No. 15 NM Racing Team	(Germany) No. 111 SR Motorsport	
4	3	(Spain) Circuit Ricardo Tormo	17–18 February	**(United Kingdom) Tom Lebbon** **(United Kingdom) Zac Meakin**	(Germany) Markus Michele (Germany) Philip Wiskirchen	(Spain) Alberto de Martin (Spain) Nil Montserrat	(Germany) Michael Sander (Germany) Tim Neuser	
5	1	(Spain) MotorLand Aragón	2–3 March	**(United Kingdom) No. 19 Forsetti Motorsport**	(Germany) No. 85 CV Performance Group	(Spain) No. 10 NM Racing Team	(Germany) No. 111 SR Motorsport	
5	1	(Spain) MotorLand Aragón	2–3 March	**(United Arab Emirates) Jamie Day** **(United Kingdom) Mikey Porter**	(United Kingdom) Charles Dawson (Norway) Emil Gjerdrum	(Switzerland) Max Huber	(Germany) Michael Sander (Germany) Tim Neuser	
5	2	(Spain) MotorLand Aragón	2–3 March	**(Germany) No. 11 Schnitzelalm Racing**	(Austria) No. 24 Wimmer Werk Motorsport	(Spain) No. 10 NM Racing Team	(Germany) No. 110 SR Motorsport	
5	2	(Spain) MotorLand Aragón	2–3 March	**(Germany) Marcel Marchewicz** **(Germany) Joel Mesch**	Ivan Ekelchik (Kazakhstan) Egor Khichin	(Switzerland) Max Huber	(Germany) Willi Kühne (Germany) Enrico Förderer	
5	3	(Spain) MotorLand Aragón	2–3 March					
6	1	(Spain) Circuit de Barcelona-Catalunya	9–10 March					
6	2	(Spain) Circuit de Barcelona-Catalunya	9–10 March					
6	3	(Spain) Circuit de Barcelona-Catalunya	9–10 March					

== Championship Standings ==
Points are awarded as follows:

Position in class	Number of starters per class						
Position in class	1	2	3	4	5	6	7
1st	5.00	7.50	8.33	8.75	9.00	9.17	9.29
2nd		2.50	5.00	6.25	7.00	7.50	7.86
3rd			1.67	3.75	5.00	5.83	6.43
4th				1.25	3.00	4.17	5.00
5th					1.00	2.50	3.57
6th						0.83	2.14
7th							0.71

=== GT4 Pro Drivers ===
Pos.	Driver	Team	EST (Portugal)			POR (Portugal)			JER (Spain)			VAL (Spain)			ARA (Spain)			CAT (Spain)			Points
Pos.	Driver	Team	RC1	RC2	RC3	RC1	RC2	RC3	RC1	RC2	RC3	RC1	RC2	RC3	RC1	RC2	RC3	RC1	RC2	RC3	Points
1	(Germany) Joel Mesch	(Germany) Schnitzelalm Racing	2	2	1	1	2	2	Ret	4	3	2	1	Ret	3	1					42.50
2	(United Arab Emirates) Jamie Day	(United Kingdom) Forsetti Motorsport	1	3	2	3	1	1	1	3	5	1	2	2	1	3					40
2	(United Kingdom) Mikey Porter	(United Kingdom) Forsetti Motorsport	1	3	2	3	1	1	1	3	5	1	2	2	1	3					40
3	(Germany) Jay Mo Härtling	(Germany) Schnitzelalm Racing	2	2	1																21.25
3	(Germany) Marcel Marchewicz	(Germany) Schnitzelalm Racing				1	2	2	Ret	4	3	2	1	Ret	3	1					21.25
4	(United Kingdom) Tom Lebbon	(United Kingdom) Elite Motorsport	4	1	4	4	4	3	2	1	1	3	3	1	2	2					17.50
4	(United Kingdom) Zac Meakin	(United Kingdom) Elite Motorsport	4	1	4	4	4	3	2	1	1	3	3	1	2	2					17.50
4	(Brazil) Roberto Faria	(Portugal) RACAR Motorsport	3	Ret	3	2	3	Ret													17.50
4	(France) Mathieu Martins	(Portugal) RACAR Motorsport	3	Ret	3	2	3	Ret													17.50
–	(Germany) Mattis Pluschkell	(Germany) BWT Mücke Motorsport							3	5	2										
–	(Republic of Ireland) Alex Denning	(United Kingdom) Elite Motorsport							4	2	4										
–	(United Kingdom) Tom Emson	(United Kingdom) Elite Motorsport							4	2	4										
–	(United Kingdom) Matt George	(United Kingdom) Forsetti Motorsport										4	4	3							
–	(United Arab Emirates) Alex Connor	(Germany) CV Performance Group													4	4					
–	(United Arab Emirates) Lachlan Robinson	(Germany) CV Performance Group													4	4					
–	(Austria) Daniel Drexel	(Austria) razoon - more than racing													Ret	5					

=== GT4 Pro/Am Drivers ===
Pos.	Driver	Team	EST (Portugal)			POR (Portugal)			JER (Spain)			VAL (Spain)			ARA (Spain)			CAT (Spain)			Points
Pos.	Driver	Team	RC1	RC2	RC3	RC1	RC2	RC3	RC1	RC2	RC3	RC1	RC2	RC3	RC1	RC2	RC3	RC1	RC2	RC3	Points
1	(Austria) Leo Pichler	(Austria) razoon - more than racing	1	1	Ret	4	1	1													35.41
2	(Austria) Andreas Höfler	(Austria) razoon - more than racing		1	Ret	4	1	1													27.08
3	(United Kingdom) Charles Dawson	(Germany) CV Performance Group	Ret	2	1	1	3	Ret	1	2	2										25.83
3	(Norway) Emil Gjerdrum	(Germany) CV Performance Group	Ret	2	1	1	3	Ret	1	2	2										25.83
4	Ivan Ekelchik	(Austria) Wimmer Werk Motorsport	2	DSQ	Ret	3	2	2													21.25
4	(Kazakhstan) Egor Khichin	(Austria) Wimmer Werk Motorsport	2	DSQ	Ret	3	2	2													21.25
5	(New Zealand) Rianna O'Meara-Hunt	(Germany) FK Performance Motorsport				2	4	3													11.25
5	(Netherlands) Gianni Van de Craatz	(Germany) FK Performance Motorsport				2	4	3													11.25
–	(Germany) Alexander Danzer	(Germany) W&S Motorsport							2	1	1										
–	(Czech Republic) Josef Knopp	(Germany) W&S Motorsport							2	1	1										

=== GT4 Am Drivers ===
Pos.	Driver	Team	EST (Portugal)			POR (Portugal)			JER (Spain)			VAL (Spain)			ARA (Spain)			CAT (Spain)			Points
Pos.	Driver	Team	RC1	RC2	RC3	RC1	RC2	RC3	RC1	RC2	RC3	RC1	RC2	RC3	RC1	RC2	RC3	RC1	RC2	RC3	Points
1	(Spain) Alberto de Martin	(Spain) NM Racing Team	Ret	3	1	2	1	1	1	3	2										39.75
2	(Switzerland) Max Huber	(Spain) NM Racing Team	1	2	2	1	3	Ret	3	2	1										38.17
3	(Spain) Nil Montserrat	(Spain) NM Racing Team	DNS	DNS	1	2	1	1	1	3	2										33.92
4	(Austria) Richard Wolf	(Austria) razoon - more than racing	3	4	5	3	2	2													30.75
5	(Portugal) Luis Liberal	(Portugal) Speedy Motorsport	2	1	3	Ret	4	DNS													25.50
6	(Turkey) Önder Erdem	(Austria) razoon - more than racing	3	4	5																12.50
7	(Germany) Florian Bauer	(Germany) East-Racing Motorsport	4	Ret	4				2	1	3										8.34
7	(Germany) Jan Niklas Sommershoff	(Germany) East-Racing Motorsport	4	Ret	4																8.34
8	(Germany) Michael Bonk	(Germany) Hofor Racing by Bonk Motorsport				4	5	3													7.75
8	(Switzerland) Martin Kroll	(Germany) Hofor Racing by Bonk Motorsport				4	5	3													7.75
9	(Germany) Pierre Lemmerz	(Germany) Teichmann Racing	5	5	6																5.83

=== Cayman Trophy Drivers ===
Pos.	Driver	Team	EST (Portugal)			POR (Portugal)			JER (Spain)			VAL (Spain)			ARA (Spain)			CAT (Spain)			Points
Pos.	Driver	Team	RC1	RC2	RC3	RC1	RC2	RC3	RC1	RC2	RC3	RC1	RC2	RC3	RC1	RC2	RC3	RC1	RC2	RC3	Points
1	(Germany) Michael Sander	(Germany) SR Motorsport	2	2	1	1	2	2	1	2	1										30.83
2	(Germany) Willi Kühne	(Germany) SR Motorsport	1	1	2	3	1	3	2	1	2										29.17
2	(Germany) Enrico Förderer	(Germany) SR Motorsport	1	1	2	3	1	3	2	1	2										29.17
3	(Germany) Thomas Rackl	(Germany) SR Motorsport				1	2	2													18.33
4	(Germany) Arne Hoffmeister	(Germany) Speedworxx Automotive				2	3	1													15.00
4	(Germany) Franz Linden	(Germany) Speedworxx Automotive				2	3	1													15.00
5	(Germany) Tim Neuser	(Germany) SR Motorsport	2	2	1				1	2	1										12.50
