= Charles Dawson (racing driver) =

British racing driver (born 1990)

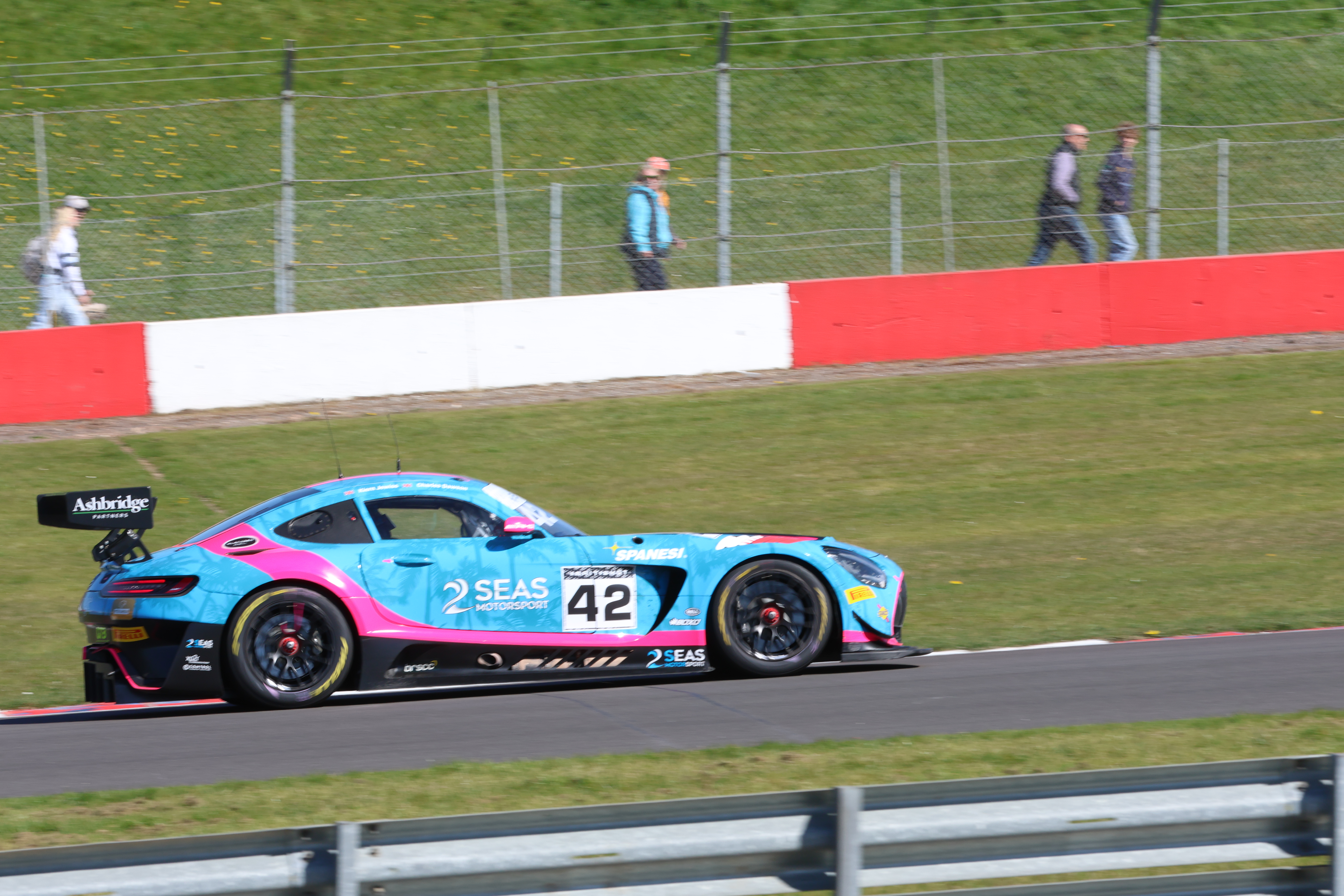
- Dawson in 2025
- Nationality: (United Kingdom) British
- Born: Charles Piers Leighton Dawson; December 1990 (age 35) Guiting Power, England
- Categorisation: FIA Bronze

Championship titles
- 2025 2025 2024 2024 2022: British GT – GT3; British GT – GT3 Pro-Am; British GT – GT4 Pro-Am; GT4 Winter Series – Pro-Am; NES 500 – TCR

Charles Piers Leighton Dawson (born December 1990) is a British racing driver who last competed in GT World Challenge Europe for 2 Seas Motorsport. He won the 2025 British GT Championship together with Kiern Jewiss.

== Career ==
Dawson began his racing career in 2022, competing at the 6 Hours of Abu Dhabi for AC Motorsport in the TCR class. Following that, Dawson joined Max Kruse Racing to compete in the NES 500, winning the TCR title on debut, as well as winning in a one-off appearance in the Spezial Tourenwagen Trophy in Division 2. During 2022, Dawson also competed in select rounds of the 24H TCE Series for Autorama Motorsport by Wolf-Power Racing and AC Motorsport, taking one TCR class podium for each team.

In 2023, Dawson joined Porsche-affiliated W&S Motorsport to compete in the GT4 European Series, but was forced to skip the first four rounds after injuring himself in a testing accident on the eve of the season at Monza. Returning for the final two rounds, Dawson salvaged a lone Am class podium at the Hockenheimring and ended the season 11th in points. During 2023, Dawson also competed in the GT Cup Championship on a part-time basis for Mercedes-linked Ram Racing in the GTH class, as well as racing at the 24 Hours of Barcelona for Red Ant Racing in the 992 class.

Continuing in GT4 machinery for 2024, Dawson began the year with CV Performance Group in the GT4 Winter Series, winning the Pro-Am title alongside Emil Gjerdrum with four wins to their name. For the rest of the year, Dawson joined Team Parker Racing to race a Mercedes-AMG GT4 in the British GT Championship and select rounds of the GT Cup Championship alongside Seb Morris. Between the two campaigns, Dawson found more success in the former, winning at Oulton Park on his way to third in GT4 points and sealing the Pro-Am title in the process. Towards the end of the year, Dawson returned to the GT4 European Series with fellow Mercedes outfit NM Racing Team alongside Andy Cantu, taking a pair of Am wins at Hockenheim and Monza, as well as a Pro-Am win at Jeddah.

Stepping up to GT3 for 2025, Dawson made his debut for AKM Motorsport in the GT Winter Series at Aragón, before joining 2 Seas Motorsport to share a Mercedes-AMG GT3 Evo with Kiern Jewiss in the British GT Championship. In his first year in the category, Dawson established himself as the fastest bronze-rated driver, winning at Donington Park, Snetterton and Brands Hatch en route to the overall and Pro-Am titles at season's end. During 2025, Dawson also raced with the team in the last three rounds of the GT World Challenge Europe Endurance Cup, most notably taking a Bronze win at the Nürburgring with Ben Barnicoat and Tom Lebbon, as well as a Pro-Am podium in International GT Open at Barcelona.

The following year, Dawson remained with 2 Seas Motorsport for a dual campaign in the Bronze class of the GT World Challenge Europe Endurance and Sprint Cups, partnering Reece Barr in the former and Jewiss in both. In the Endurance Cup, Dawson took class wins at the Nürburgring and Algarve to secure third in points, while in the latter, he clinched third in the Bronze Cup points with four class podiums to his name. During 2026, Dawson also made selected appearances in British GT for the team, in which he took an overall podium at Donington Park. At the end of the year, Dawson continued with 2 Seas to compete in the GT3 class of the 2026–27 Asian Le Mans Series.

== Racing record ==
=== Racing career summary ===
Season	Series	Team	Races	Wins	Poles	F/Laps	Podiums	Points	Position
2022	6 Hours of Abu Dhabi – TCR	AC Motorsport	1	0	0	0	0	—N/a	5th
2022	NES 500 – TCR	Max Kruse Racing							**1st**
2022	Spezial Tourenwagen Trophy – Division 2	Max Kruse Racing	2	1	0	0	2	39.65	
2022	24H TCE Series – TCR	Autorama Motorsport by Wolf-Power Racing	1	0	0	0	1	49	7th
2022	24H TCE Series – TCR	AC Motorsport	1	0	0	0	1	49	7th
2023	GT Cup Championship – GTH	Ram Racing							
2023	GT4 European Series – Am	W&S Motorsport	3	0	0	0	1	30	11th
2023	24H GT Series – 992	Red Ant Racing	1	0	0	0	0	29	NC
2024	GT4 Winter Series – Pro-Am	CV Performance Group	18	4	3	1	14	79.58	**1st**
2024	British GT Championship – GT4 Pro-Am	Team Parker Racing	9	1	0	0	4	136	**3rd**
2024	GT Cup Championship – GTH	Team Parker Racing							
2024	GT4 European Series – Am	NM Racing Team	4	2	0	0	2	62	10th
2024	GT4 European Series – Pro-Am	NM Racing Team	2	1	0	0	1	33	12th
2025	GT Winter Series – GT3	AKM Motorsport	3	0	0	0	2	34	12th
2025	British GT Championship – GT3 Pro-Am	2 Seas Motorsport	9	3	0	0	4	173.5	**1st**
2025	GT World Challenge Europe Endurance Cup	2 Seas Motorsport	3	0	0	0	0	0	NC
2025	GT World Challenge Europe Endurance Cup – Bronze	2 Seas Motorsport	3	1	0	0	1	32	12th
2025	Intercontinental GT Challenge	2 Seas Motorsport	1	0	0	0	0	0	NC
2025	International GT Open	2 Seas Motorsport	2	0	0	0	0	0	47th
2025	International GT Open – Pro-Am	2 Seas Motorsport	2	2	0	0	1	10	19th
2026	GT World Challenge Europe Endurance Cup	2 Seas Motorsport	5	0	0	0	0	0	NC
2026	GT World Challenge Europe Endurance Cup – Bronze	2 Seas Motorsport	5	2	1	0	2	82	**3rd**
2026	Intercontinental GT Challenge	2 Seas Motorsport	1	0	0	0	0	0	NC
2026	British GT Championship – GT3	2 Seas Motorsport	2	0	0	0	1	22.5	12th
2026	GT World Challenge Europe Sprint Cup	2 Seas Motorsport	8	0	0	0	0	0	NC
2026	GT World Challenge Europe Sprint Cup – Bronze	2 Seas Motorsport	8	0	4	1	4	69.5	**3rd**
2026–27	Asian Le Mans Series – GT3	2 Seas Motorsport							

* Season still in progress.

^{†} As Dawson was a guest driver, he was ineligible for points.

=== Complete GT4 European Series results ===
(key) (Races in bold indicate pole position) (Races in italics indicate fastest lap)

Year	Team	Car	Class	1	2	3	4	5	6	7	8	9	10	11	12	Pos	Points
2023	W&S Motorsport	Porsche 718 Cayman GT4 RS Clubsport	Am	MNZ; 1	MNZ; 2	LEC; 1	LEC; 2	SPA; 1	SPA; 2	MIS; 1	MIS; 2	HOC; 1; 30	HOC; 2; 19	CAT; 1 Ret	CAT; 2 WD	11th	30
2024	NM Racing Team	Mercedes AMG GT4	Am	LEC; 1	LEC; 2	MIS; 1	MIS; 2	SPA; 1	SPA; 2	HOC; 1; 31	HOC; 2; 13	MNZ; 1; 40	MNZ; 2; 20			10th	62
2024	NM Racing Team	Mercedes AMG GT4	Pro-Am											JED; 1; 22	JED; 2; 13	12th	33

=== Complete British GT Championship results ===
(key) (Races in bold indicate pole position) (Races in italics indicate fastest lap)

Year	Team	Car	Class	1	2	3	4	5	6	7	8	9	DC	Points
2024	Team Parker Racing	Mercedes-AMG GT4	GT4	OUL; 1; 20	**OUL**; **2**; 18	SIL; 23	DON1; Ret	SPA; 16	SNE; 1; 16	SNE; 2; 17	DON2; 14	BRH; 20	3rd	136
2025	2 Seas Motorsport	Mercedes-AMG GT3 Evo	GT3	**DON1**; 1	SIL; 2	OUL; 1; 9	OUL; 2; 11	SPA; 6	**SNE**; **1**; 1	SNE; 2; 8	BRH; 1	DON2; 4	1st	173.5
2026	2 Seas Motorsport	Mercedes-AMG GT3 Evo	GT3	SIL; Ret	OUL; 1	OUL; 2	SPA	SNE; 1	SNE; 2	DON; 3	BRH		12th	22.5

=== Complete GT World Challenge Europe results ===
==== GT World Challenge Europe Endurance Cup ====
(key) (Races in bold indicate pole position) (Races in italics indicate fastest lap)

Year	Team	Car	Class	1	2	3	4	5	6	7	Pos.	Points
2025	2 Seas Motorsport	Mercedes-AMG GT3 Evo	Bronze	LEC	MNZ	SPA; 6H; 56	SPA; 12H; 40	SPA; 24H; 26	NÜR; 31	CAT; 44	12th	32
2026	2 Seas Motorsport	Mercedes-AMG GT3 Evo	Bronze	LEC; 27	MNZ; 41†	SPA; 6H; 38	SPA; 12H; 20	SPA; 24H; 27	**NÜR**; 23	ALG; 13	3rd	82

==== GT World Challenge Europe Sprint Cup ====
(key) (Races in bold indicate pole position) (Races in italics indicate fastest lap)

Year	Team	Car	Class	1	2	3	4	5	6	7	8	Pos.	Points
2026	2 Seas Motorsport	Mercedes-AMG GT3 Evo	Bronze	MIS; 1; 26	**MIS**; **2**; 31	**MAG**; **1**; 21	MAG; 2; 25	ZAN; 1; 26	**ZAN**; **2**; 23	**CAT**; **1**; 35	CAT; 2; 30	3rd	69.5

=== Complete International GT Open Results ===
(key) (Races in bold indicate pole position) (Races in italics indicate fastest lap)

Year	Team	Car	Class	1	2	3	4	5	6	7	8	9	10	11	12	13	14	Pos.	Points
2025	2 Seas Motorsport	Mercedes-AMG GT3 Evo	Pro-Am	ALG; 1	ALG; 2	SPA	HOC; 1	HOC; 2	HUN; 1	HUN; 2	LEC; 1	LEC; 2	RBR; 1	RBR; 2	CAT; 1; 5	CAT; 2; 3	MNZ	19th	10
