= Zac Meakin =

British-Ukrainian racing driver (born 2006)

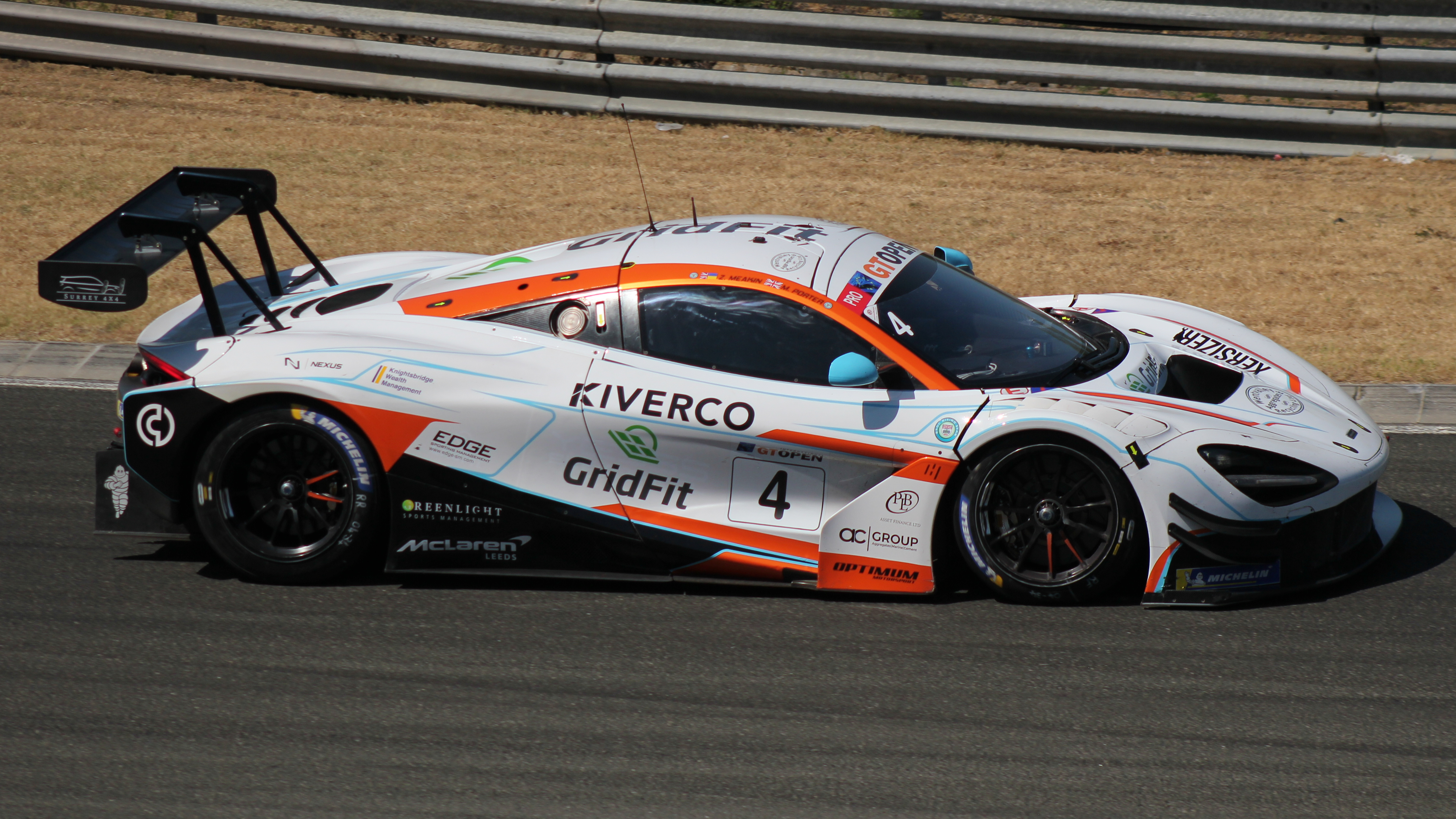
- Meakin in 2025
- Born: Zac Brian Meakin; 18 December 2006 (age 19)
- Nationality: (United Kingdom) British
- Categorisation: FIA Silver

Championship titles
- 2024: British GT – GT4

Zac Brian Meakin (born 18 November 2006) is a British-Ukrainian racing driver who last competed for Greystone GT in International GT Open.

== Career ==
Meakin stepped up to car racing in 2021, joining Raceway Motorsport to compete in the Ginetta Junior Championship. Spending two seasons in the series, Meakin scored a lone podium at Thruxton in his sophomore season, in which he drove for Preptech UK on his way to 11th in points. The following year, Meakin switched to GT4 competition as he joined Team Parker Racing in the British GT Championship. Starting off with a Porsche Cayman, Meakin took pole at Silverstone as the grid was set by FP2 times, and scored a best result of sixth at Oulton Park as he ended the year 14th in points after switching to a McLaren Artura mid-season.

Staying in GT4 competition for 2024, Meakin joined Elite Motorsport to race in the GT4 Winter Series alongside Tom Lebbon. After taking his maiden win in car racing at Estoril, Meakin won at Jerez, before taking his fourth win of the season at Valencia. Meakin took a final win at Barcelona on his way to third in points. For the rest of the year, Meakin returned to the GT4 class of the British GT Championship, joining Optimum Motorsport for his sophomore season alongside Jack Brown. Taking his first win of the season at Silverstone, Meakin took further wins at Donington Park, Snetterton and Brands Hatch to clinch the GT4 title at season's end. At the end of 2024, Meakin made his International GT Open debut at Monza for Optimum Motorsport alongside Mikey Porter.

Meakin returned to International GT Open the following year, returning to Optimum Motorsport alongside Porter for his first full-season in the series. In the season-opening round at Algarve, Meakin took his maiden series podium in race two by finishing second, a feat he repeated at the Hungaroring and Le Castellet to end the year eighth in points. During 2025, Meakin made a one-off appearance in the GT4 European Series for RAFA Racing by Race Lab at Spa, replacing Julius Dinesen in the team's No. 81 entry. Meakin also made his debut in the GT World Challenge Europe Endurance Cup for Greystone GT at Barcelona, finishing sixth in the Silver Cup on his debut.

After winning the 6 hours of Portimão with Greystone GT at the start of the year, Meakin continued with the team for the rest of the year to compete in International GT Open and the 24 Hours of Spa, as a new addition to the McLaren GT3 Junior Driver Programme. After starting off the season with a win at Algarve, Meakin scored nine further podiums, as well as taking his second win of the season at the Barcelona finale to clinch runner-up honours overall.

== Karting record ==
=== Karting career summary ===
Season	Series	Team	Position
2018	Kartmasters British GP – X30 Mini	Wentvalley Motorsports	8th
2018	IAME Winter Cup – X30 Junior	Wentvalley Motorsports	28th
2018	IAME International Final – X30 Junior	Fusion Motorsport	NC
2019	British Kart Championship – X30 Junior	Fusion Motorsport	13th
2019	IAME International Final – X30 Junior		22nd

== Racing record ==
=== Racing career summary ===
Season	Series	Team	Races	Wins	Poles	F/Laps	Podiums	Points	Position
2021	Ginetta Junior Championship	Raceway Motorsport	20	0	0	0	0	92	20th
2022	Ginetta Junior Championship	Preptech UK	25	0	0	0	1	273	11th
2023	British GT Championship – GT4	Team Parker Racing	8	0	1	0	0	30	14th
2024	GT4 Winter Series	Elite Motorsport	18	6	3	2	13	99.71	**3rd**
2024	British GT Championship – GT4	Optimum Motorsport	9	4	2	0	5	171.5	**1st**
2024	International GT Open	Optimum Motorsport	1	0	0	0	0	0	NC†
2025	International GT Open	Optimum Motorsport	14	0	0	0	3	88	8th
2025	McLaren Trophy Europe – Pro	SMC Motorsport	10	2	1	0	6	84	4th
2025	GT4 European Series – Silver	RAFA Racing by Race Lab	2	0	0	0	0	1	22nd
2025	GT World Challenge Europe Endurance Cup	Greystone GT	1	0	0	0	0	0	NC
2025	GT World Challenge Europe Endurance Cup – Silver	Greystone GT	1	0	0	0	0	8	32nd
2026	6H of Portimão	Greystone GT	1	1	1	0	1	—N/a	**1st**
2026	International GT Open	Greystone GT	14	2	3	3	11	147	**2nd**
2026	GT World Challenge Europe Endurance Cup	Greystone GT	1	0	0	0	0	0	NC
2026	GT World Challenge Europe Endurance Cup – Silver	Greystone GT	1	0	0	0	0	2	35th

^{†} As Meakin was a guest driver, he was ineligible to score points.

=== Complete Ginetta Junior Championship results ===
(key) (Races in bold indicate pole position) (Races in italics indicate fastest lap)

Year	Team	1	2	3	4	5	6	7	8	9	10	11	12	13	14	15	16	17	18	19	20	21	22	23	24	25	26	DC	Points
2021	Raceway Motorsport	THR; 1; 13	THR; 2; 15	SNE; 1; 21	SNE; 2; 15	SNE; 3; 17	BHI; 1; 14	BHI; 2; 18	BHI; 3; 16	OUL; 1 Ret	OUL; 2 C	KNO; 1 Ret	KNO; 2; 11	KNO; 3 Ret	KNO; 4 DNS	THR; 1	THR; 2	THR; 3	SIL; 1; 23	SIL; 2; 14	SIL; 3; 16	DON; 1; 18	DON; 2; 11	DON; 3; 14	BHGP; 1; 19	BHGP; 2; 18	BHGP; 3; 15	20th	92
2022	Preptech UK	DON; 1; 12	DON; 2; 15	DON; 3 Ret	BHI; 1; 8	BHI; 2; 10	BHI; 3; 12	THR1; 1; 13	THR1; 2; 5	CRO; 1; 18	CRO; 2; 11	KNO; 1; 7	KNO; 2; 4	KNO; 3; 5	SNE; 1; 10	SNE; 2; 11	SNE; 3; 12	THR2; 1; 10	THR2; 2; 2	THR2; 3; 9	SIL; 1; 8	SIL; 2 Ret	SIL; 3; 16	BHGP; 1 Ret	BHGP; 2; 10	BHGP; 3; 9		11th	273

=== Complete British GT Championship results ===
(key) (Races in bold indicate pole position in class) (Races in italics indicate fastest lap in class)

Year	Entrant	Chassis	Class	1	2	3	4	5	6	7	8	9	DC	Pts
2023	Team Parker Racing	Porsche 718 Cayman GT4 RS Clubsport	GT4	OUL; 1; 24	OUL; 2; 23	**SIL**; 25	DON; DNS	SNE; 1 Ret	SNE; 2 Ret				14th	30
2023	Team Parker Racing	McLaren Artura GT4	GT4							ALG; 23	BRH; Ret	DON; 28	14th	30
2024	Optimum Motorsport	McLaren Artura GT4	GT4	OUL; 1; 22	OUL; 2; 21	**SIL**; 20	DON1; 18	SPA; 23	SNE; 1; 21	SNE; 2; 14	DON2; 23	**BRH**; 13	1st	171.5

=== Complete International GT Open results ===
(key) (Races in bold indicate pole position) (Races in italics indicate fastest lap)

Year	Team	Car	Class	1	2	3	4	5	6	7	8	9	10	11	12	13	14	Pos.	Points
2024	Optimum Motorsport	McLaren 720S GT3 Evo	Pro	ALG; 1	ALG; 2	HOC; 1	HOC; 2	SPA	HUN; 1	HUN; 2	LEC; 1	LEC; 2	RBR; 1	RBR; 2	CAT; 1	CAT; 2	MNZ; 27	NC†	0
2025	Optimum Motorsport	McLaren 720S GT3 Evo	Pro	ALG; 1; 6	ALG; 2; 2	SPA; 4	HOC; 1; 4	HOC; 2; 7	HUN; 1; 2	HUN; 2; 9	LEC; 1; 6	LEC; 2; 2	RBR; 1; 19	RBR; 2; 13	CAT; 1; 5	CAT; 2; 5	MNZ; 25	8th	88
2026	Greystone GT	McLaren 720S GT3 Evo	Pro	ALG; 1; 3	**ALG**; **2**; 1	SPA; 13	**MIS**; **1**; 2	MIS; 2; 2	HUN; 1; 3	HUN; 2; 2	LEC; 1 Ret	LEC; 2; 6	HOC; 1; 2	HOC; 2; 3	MNZ; 2	CAT; 1; 3	**CAT**; **2**; 1	2nd	147

^{†} As Meakin was a guest driver, he was ineligible to score points. ^{*}Season still in progress.

=== Complete GT4 European Series results ===
(key) (Races in bold indicate pole position) (Races in italics indicate fastest lap)

Year	Team	Car	Class	1	2	3	4	5	6	7	8	9	10	11	12	Pos	Points
2025	RAFA Racing by Race Lab	McLaren Artura GT4	Silver	LEC; 1	LEC; 2	ZAN; 1	ZAN; 2	SPA; 1; 13	SPA; 2; 10	MIS; 1	MIS; 2	NÜR; 1	NÜR; 2	CAT; 1	CAT; 2	22nd	1

=== Complete GT World Challenge Europe results ===
==== GT World Challenge Europe Endurance Cup ====
(key) (Races in bold indicate pole position) (Races in italics indicate fastest lap)

Year	Team	Car	Class	1	2	3	4	5	6	7	Pos.	Points
2025	Greystone GT	McLaren 720S GT3 Evo	Silver	LEC	MNZ	SPA; 6H	SPA; 12H	SPA; 24H	NÜR	CAT; 24	32nd	8
2026	Greystone GT	McLaren 720S GT3 Evo	Silver	LEC	MNZ	SPA; 6H; 34	SPA; 12H; 52	SPA; 24H; 37	NÜR	ALG	35th	2
