= 2024 British GT Championship =

Sports car racing season

The 2024 British GT Championship is the 32nd British GT Championship, a sports car championship promoted by the SRO Motorsports Group. The season began on 30 March at Oulton Park and ended on 29 September at Brands Hatch.

== Calendar ==
The calendar was unveiled on 27 July 2023. In a change from the 2023 schedule, the annual overseas round sees the return of Spa after racing at Portimão the previous year.

Round	Circuit	Length	Date
1	(United Kingdom) Oulton Park, Cheshire	60 min	30 March–1 April
2	(United Kingdom) Oulton Park, Cheshire	60 min	30 March–1 April
3	(United Kingdom) Silverstone Circuit, Northamptonshire	180 min	27–28 April
4	(United Kingdom) Donington Park, Leicestershire	180 min	25–26 May
5	Circuit de Spa-Francorchamps, Stavelot, Belgium	120 min	22–23 June
6	(United Kingdom) Snetterton Circuit, Norfolk	60 min	13–14 July
7	(United Kingdom) Snetterton Circuit, Norfolk	60 min	13–14 July
8	(United Kingdom) Donington Park, Leicestershire	120 min	7–8 September
9	(United Kingdom) Brands Hatch, Kent	120 min	28–29 September

== Entry list ==
Team	Car	Engine	No.	Drivers	Class	Rounds
GT3
(United Kingdom) Century Motorsport	BMW M4 GT3	BMW S58B30T0 3.0 L Turbo I6	1	(United Kingdom) Darren Leung	PA	3
(United Kingdom) Century Motorsport	BMW M4 GT3	BMW S58B30T0 3.0 L Turbo I6	1	(Belgium) Dries Vanthoor	PA	3
(United Kingdom) Century Motorsport	BMW M4 GT3	BMW S58B30T0 3.0 L Turbo I6	14	(United Kingdom) Dan Harper	PA	1–4
(United Kingdom) Century Motorsport	BMW M4 GT3	BMW S58B30T0 3.0 L Turbo I6	14	(United Kingdom) Michael Johnston	PA	1–4
(United Kingdom) Century Motorsport	BMW M4 GT3	BMW S58B30T0 3.0 L Turbo I6	22	(United Kingdom) Carl Cavers	SA	All
(United Kingdom) Century Motorsport	BMW M4 GT3	BMW S58B30T0 3.0 L Turbo I6	22	(United Kingdom) Lewis Plato	SA	All
(United Kingdom) Team RJN	McLaren 720S GT3 Evo	McLaren M840T 4.0 L Turbo V8	2	(United Kingdom) Alex Buncombe	PA	1–5, 9
(United Kingdom) Team RJN	McLaren 720S GT3 Evo	McLaren M840T 4.0 L Turbo V8	2	(United Kingdom) Chris Buncombe	PA	1–2, 4–5
(United Kingdom) Team RJN	McLaren 720S GT3 Evo	McLaren M840T 4.0 L Turbo V8	2	(United Kingdom) Simon Watts	PA	3
(United Kingdom) Team RJN	McLaren 720S GT3 Evo	McLaren M840T 4.0 L Turbo V8	2	(United Kingdom) Josh Caygill	PA	9
(United Kingdom) Team RJN	McLaren 720S GT3 Evo	McLaren M840T 4.0 L Turbo V8	23	(United Kingdom) Chris Buncombe	PA	3
(United Kingdom) Team RJN	McLaren 720S GT3 Evo	McLaren M840T 4.0 L Turbo V8	23	(United Kingdom) Jann Mardenborough	PA	3
(United Kingdom) Greystone GT	Mercedes-AMG GT3 Evo	Mercedes-AMG M159 6.2 L V8	3	(United Kingdom) Callum MacLeod	PA	All
(United Kingdom) Greystone GT	Mercedes-AMG GT3 Evo	Mercedes-AMG M159 6.2 L V8	3	(United Kingdom) Mike Price	PA	All
(United Kingdom) Greystone GT	McLaren 720S GT3 Evo	McLaren M840T 4.0 L Turbo V8	99	(Estonia) Andrey Borodin	PA	5
(United Kingdom) Greystone GT	McLaren 720S GT3 Evo	McLaren M840T 4.0 L Turbo V8	99	(United Kingdom) Oliver Webb	PA	5
(Bahrain) 2 Seas Motorsport	Mercedes-AMG GT3 Evo	Mercedes-AMG M159 6.2 L V8	6	(United Kingdom) Phil Keen	PA	1–7
(Bahrain) 2 Seas Motorsport	Mercedes-AMG GT3 Evo	Mercedes-AMG M159 6.2 L V8	6	(United Kingdom) Ian Loggie	PA	1–7
(Bahrain) 2 Seas Motorsport	Mercedes-AMG GT3 Evo	Mercedes-AMG M159 6.2 L V8	18	(Germany) Maximilian Götz	PA	All
(Bahrain) 2 Seas Motorsport	Mercedes-AMG GT3 Evo	Mercedes-AMG M159 6.2 L V8	18	(Hong Kong) Kevin Tse	PA	All
(Bahrain) 2 Seas Motorsport	Porsche 911 GT3 R (992)	Porsche M97/80 4.2 L Flat-6	6	(United Kingdom) Phil Keen	PA	8
(Bahrain) 2 Seas Motorsport	Porsche 911 GT3 R (992)	Porsche M97/80 4.2 L Flat-6	6	(United Kingdom) Ian Loggie	PA	8
(United Kingdom) Team Abba Racing	Mercedes-AMG GT3 Evo	Mercedes-AMG M159 6.2 L V8	8	(United Kingdom) Richard Neary	SA	All
(United Kingdom) Team Abba Racing	Mercedes-AMG GT3 Evo	Mercedes-AMG M159 6.2 L V8	8	(United Kingdom) Sam Neary	SA	All
(United Kingdom) Paddock Motorsport	McLaren 720S GT3 Evo	McLaren M840T 4.0 L Turbo V8	9	(United Kingdom) Martin Plowman	PA	All
(United Kingdom) Paddock Motorsport	McLaren 720S GT3 Evo	McLaren M840T 4.0 L Turbo V8	9	(United States) Mark Smith	PA	All
(United Kingdom) Blackthorn	Aston Martin Vantage AMR GT3 1–2; Aston Martin Vantage AMR GT3 Evo 3–8	Aston Martin M177 4.0 L Turbo V8	10	(United Kingdom) Josh Rowledge	SA	1–8
(United Kingdom) Blackthorn	Aston Martin Vantage AMR GT3 1–2; Aston Martin Vantage AMR GT3 Evo 3–8	Aston Martin M177 4.0 L Turbo V8	10	(United Kingdom) Matt Topham	SA	1–8
(United Kingdom) Blackthorn	Aston Martin Vantage AMR GT3 1–2; Aston Martin Vantage AMR GT3 Evo 3–8	Aston Martin M177 4.0 L Turbo V8	87	(United Kingdom) Jonathan Adam	PA	1–8
(United Kingdom) Blackthorn	Aston Martin Vantage AMR GT3 1–2; Aston Martin Vantage AMR GT3 Evo 3–8	Aston Martin M177 4.0 L Turbo V8	87	(Italy) Giacomo Petrobelli	PA	1–8
(United Kingdom) RAM Racing	BMW M4 GT3	BMW S58B30T0 3.0 L Turbo I6	15	(United Kingdom) John Ferguson	PA	1–8
(United Kingdom) RAM Racing	BMW M4 GT3	BMW S58B30T0 3.0 L Turbo I6	15	(Switzerland) Raffaele Marciello	PA	1–5
(United Kingdom) RAM Racing	BMW M4 GT3	BMW S58B30T0 3.0 L Turbo I6	15	(Germany) Max Hesse	PA	6–8
(United Kingdom) Race Lab	McLaren 720S GT3 Evo	McLaren M840T 4.0 L Turbo V8	24	(United Kingdom) Euan Hankey	PA	3–5
(United Kingdom) Race Lab	McLaren 720S GT3 Evo	McLaren M840T 4.0 L Turbo V8	24	(United Kingdom) Lucky Khera	PA	3–5
(United Kingdom) Optimum Motorsport	McLaren 720S GT3 Evo	McLaren M840T 4.0 L Turbo V8	27	(United Kingdom) Tom Gamble	PA	All
(United Kingdom) Optimum Motorsport	McLaren 720S GT3 Evo	McLaren M840T 4.0 L Turbo V8	27	(United Kingdom) Mark Radcliffe	PA	All
(United Kingdom) Optimum Motorsport	McLaren 720S GT3 Evo	McLaren M840T 4.0 L Turbo V8	84	(United Kingdom) Andrew Gilbert	SA	3
(United Kingdom) Optimum Motorsport	McLaren 720S GT3 Evo	McLaren M840T 4.0 L Turbo V8	84	(Spain) Fran Rueda	SA	3
(United Kingdom) J&S Racing	Audi R8 LMS Evo II	Audi DAR 5.2 L V10	32	(United Kingdom) Hugo Cook	SA	All
(United Kingdom) J&S Racing	Audi R8 LMS Evo II	Audi DAR 5.2 L V10	32	(United Kingdom) Sacha Kakad	SA	All
(United Kingdom) Garage 59	McLaren 720S GT3 Evo	McLaren M840T 4.0 L Turbo V8	59	(United Kingdom) Shaun Balfe	SA	All
(United Kingdom) Garage 59	McLaren 720S GT3 Evo	McLaren M840T 4.0 L Turbo V8	59	(United Kingdom) Adam Smalley	SA	All
(United Kingdom) Garage 59	McLaren 720S GT3 Evo	McLaren M840T 4.0 L Turbo V8	77	(United Kingdom) Marcus Clutton	PA	All
(United Kingdom) Garage 59	McLaren 720S GT3 Evo	McLaren M840T 4.0 L Turbo V8	77	(United Kingdom) Morgan Tillbrook	PA	All
(United Kingdom) Garage 59	McLaren 720S GT3 Evo	McLaren M840T 4.0 L Turbo V8	88	(Portugal) Miguel Ramos	Am	5
(United Kingdom) Barwell Motorsport	Lamborghini Huracán GT3 Evo 2	Lamborghini DGF 5.2 L V10	63	(United Kingdom) Ricky Collard	PA	All
(United Kingdom) Barwell Motorsport	Lamborghini Huracán GT3 Evo 2	Lamborghini DGF 5.2 L V10	63	(United Kingdom) Rob Collard	PA	All
(United Kingdom) Barwell Motorsport	Lamborghini Huracán GT3 Evo 2	Lamborghini DGF 5.2 L V10	78	(United Kingdom) Alex Martin	PA	All
(United Kingdom) Barwell Motorsport	Lamborghini Huracán GT3 Evo 2	Lamborghini DGF 5.2 L V10	78	(United Kingdom) Sandy Mitchell	PA	All
(United Kingdom) Orange Racing powered by JMH	McLaren 720S GT3 Evo	McLaren M840T 4.0 L Turbo V8	67	(United Kingdom) Simon Orange	SA	1–5
(United Kingdom) Orange Racing powered by JMH	McLaren 720S GT3 Evo	McLaren M840T 4.0 L Turbo V8	67	(United Kingdom) Tom Roche	SA	1–5
(United Kingdom) Orange Racing powered by JMH	McLaren 720S GT3 Evo	McLaren M840T 4.0 L Turbo V8	67	(Germany) Benjamin Goethe	PA	9
(United Kingdom) Orange Racing powered by JMH	McLaren 720S GT3 Evo	McLaren M840T 4.0 L Turbo V8	67	(United Kingdom) Simon Orange	PA	9
(United Kingdom) Sky - Tempesta Racing	Ferrari 296 GT3	Ferrari F163CE 3.0 L Turbo V6	93	(United Kingdom) Chris Froggatt	SA	3
(United Kingdom) Sky - Tempesta Racing	Ferrari 296 GT3	Ferrari F163CE 3.0 L Turbo V6	93	(Sweden) Alexander West	SA	3
(United Kingdom) Beechdean AMR	Aston Martin Vantage AMR GT3 Evo	Aston Martin M177 4.0 L Turbo V8	97	(United Kingdom) Andrew Howard	SA	1–5, 8–9
(United Kingdom) Beechdean AMR	Aston Martin Vantage AMR GT3 Evo	Aston Martin M177 4.0 L Turbo V8	97	(United Kingdom) Jessica Hawkins	SA	1–5, 8
(United Kingdom) Beechdean AMR	Aston Martin Vantage AMR GT3 Evo	Aston Martin M177 4.0 L Turbo V8	97	(United Kingdom) Tom Wood	SA	9
GT4
(United Kingdom) Forsetti Motorsport	Aston Martin Vantage AMR GT4 Evo	Aston Martin M177 4.0 L Turbo V8	7	(United Arab Emirates) Jamie Day	S	All
(United Kingdom) Forsetti Motorsport	Aston Martin Vantage AMR GT4 Evo	Aston Martin M177 4.0 L Turbo V8	7	(United Kingdom) Mikey Porter	S	All
(United Kingdom) Forsetti Motorsport	Aston Martin Vantage AMR GT4 Evo	Aston Martin M177 4.0 L Turbo V8	47	(United Kingdom) William Orton	PA	All
(United Kingdom) Forsetti Motorsport	Aston Martin Vantage AMR GT4 Evo	Aston Martin M177 4.0 L Turbo V8	47	(United Kingdom) Marc Warren	PA	All
(United Kingdom) Paddock Motorsport	McLaren Artura GT4	McLaren M630 3.0 L Turbo V6	11	(United Kingdom) Alex Walker	S	1–7
(United Kingdom) Paddock Motorsport	McLaren Artura GT4	McLaren M630 3.0 L Turbo V6	11	(United Kingdom) Blake Angliss	S	1–4
(United Kingdom) Paddock Motorsport	McLaren Artura GT4	McLaren M630 3.0 L Turbo V6	11	(United Kingdom) Adam Hatfield	S	5–7
(United Kingdom) Paddock Motorsport	Mercedes-AMG GT4	Mercedes-AMG M178 4.0 L Turbo V8	12	(United Kingdom) Matt Cowley	PA	All
(United Kingdom) Paddock Motorsport	Mercedes-AMG GT4	Mercedes-AMG M178 4.0 L Turbo V8	12	(United Kingdom) Ed McDermott	PA	All
(United Kingdom) Xentek Motorsport	Porsche 718 Cayman GT4 RS Clubsport	Porsche MDG 4.0 L Flat-6	16	(United Kingdom) Bal Sidhu	PA	8
(United Kingdom) Xentek Motorsport	Porsche 718 Cayman GT4 RS Clubsport	Porsche MDG 4.0 L Flat-6	16	(United Kingdom) Josh Steed	PA	8
(United Kingdom) RAM Racing	Mercedes-AMG GT4	Mercedes-AMG M178 4.0 L Turbo V8	17	(United Kingdom) Harry George	S	All
(United Kingdom) RAM Racing	Mercedes-AMG GT4	Mercedes-AMG M178 4.0 L Turbo V8	17	(United States) Luca Hopkinson	S	All
(United Kingdom) Mahiki Racing	Lotus Emira GT4	Lotus 2GR-FE 3.6 L V6	20	(United Kingdom) Ian Duggan	PA	All
(United Kingdom) Mahiki Racing	Lotus Emira GT4	Lotus 2GR-FE 3.6 L V6	20	(United Kingdom) Gordie Mutch	PA	All
(United Kingdom) Mahiki Racing	Lotus Emira GT4	Lotus 2GR-FE 3.6 L V6	69	(United Kingdom) Nathan Harrison	PA	All
(United Kingdom) Mahiki Racing	Lotus Emira GT4	Lotus 2GR-FE 3.6 L V6	69	(United Kingdom) Steven Lake	PA	All
(United Kingdom) Breakell Racing	Mercedes-AMG GT4	Mercedes-AMG M178 4.0 L Turbo V8	25	(United Kingdom) Harley Haughton	PA	3, 8
(United Kingdom) Breakell Racing	Mercedes-AMG GT4	Mercedes-AMG M178 4.0 L Turbo V8	25	(United Kingdom) Carl Garnett	PA	3
(United Kingdom) Breakell Racing	Mercedes-AMG GT4	Mercedes-AMG M178 4.0 L Turbo V8	25	(United Kingdom) James Breakell	PA	8
(United Kingdom) Century Motorsport	BMW M4 GT4 Gen II	BMW S58B30T0 3.0 L Turbo I6	29	(United Kingdom) Ian Gough	PA	All
(United Kingdom) Century Motorsport	BMW M4 GT4 Gen II	BMW S58B30T0 3.0 L Turbo I6	29	(United Kingdom) Tom Wrigley	PA	All
(United Kingdom) Century Motorsport	BMW M4 GT4 Gen II	BMW S58B30T0 3.0 L Turbo I6	65	(United Kingdom) Nathan Freke	S	9
(United Kingdom) Century Motorsport	BMW M4 GT4 Gen II	BMW S58B30T0 3.0 L Turbo I6	65	(United Kingdom) Chris Salkeld	S	9
(United Kingdom) Century Motorsport	BMW M4 GT4 Gen II	BMW S58B30T0 3.0 L Turbo I6	71	(United Kingdom) Ravi Ramyead	PA	1–8
(United Kingdom) Century Motorsport	BMW M4 GT4 Gen II	BMW S58B30T0 3.0 L Turbo I6	71	(United Kingdom) Charlie Robertson	PA	1–8
(United Kingdom) Team Parker Racing	Mercedes-AMG GT4	Mercedes-AMG M178 4.0 L Turbo V8	30	(United Kingdom) Jon Currie	PA	8
(United Kingdom) Team Parker Racing	Mercedes-AMG GT4	Mercedes-AMG M178 4.0 L Turbo V8	30	(United Kingdom) Phil Quaife	PA	8
(United Kingdom) Team Parker Racing	Mercedes-AMG GT4	Mercedes-AMG M178 4.0 L Turbo V8	31	(United Kingdom) Charles Dawson	PA	All
(United Kingdom) Team Parker Racing	Mercedes-AMG GT4	Mercedes-AMG M178 4.0 L Turbo V8	31	(United Kingdom) Seb Morris	PA	All
(Japan) Toyota Gazoo Racing UK	Toyota GR Supra GT4 Evo	BMW B58B30 3.0 L Turbo I6	44	(United Kingdom) Kavi Jundu	PA	1–7
(Japan) Toyota Gazoo Racing UK	Toyota GR Supra GT4 Evo	BMW B58B30 3.0 L Turbo I6	44	(United Kingdom) Dan Vaughan	PA	1–7
(Japan) Toyota Gazoo Racing UK	Toyota GR Supra GT4 Evo	BMW B58B30 3.0 L Turbo I6	44	(United Kingdom) Michael O'Brien	PA	9
(Japan) Toyota Gazoo Racing UK	Toyota GR Supra GT4 Evo	BMW B58B30 3.0 L Turbo I6	44	(United Kingdom) Benjamin Tusting	PA	9
(France) Team CMR	Ginetta G56 GT4 Evo	GM LS3 6.2 L V8	56	(United Kingdom) Stuart Middleton	S	3
(France) Team CMR	Ginetta G56 GT4 Evo	GM LS3 6.2 L V8	56	(United Kingdom) Freddie Tomlinson	S	3
(United Kingdom) DTO Motorsport	Ginetta G56 GT4 Evo	GM LS3 6.2 L V8	56	(United Kingdom) Freddie Tomlinson	S	4–9
(United Kingdom) DTO Motorsport	Ginetta G56 GT4 Evo	GM LS3 6.2 L V8	56	(United Kingdom) Stuart Middleton	S	4–5
(United Kingdom) DTO Motorsport	Ginetta G56 GT4 Evo	GM LS3 6.2 L V8	56	(United Kingdom) Aston Millar	S	6–9
(United Kingdom) CWS Engineering	Ginetta G56 GT4 Evo	GM LS3 6.2 L V8	58	(United Kingdom) Tom Holland	PA	All
(United Kingdom) CWS Engineering	Ginetta G56 GT4 Evo	GM LS3 6.2 L V8	58	(United Kingdom) Colin White	PA	All
(United Kingdom) Academy Motorsport	Ford Mustang GT4 (2024)	Ford Coyote 5.0 L V8	61	(United States) Erik Evans	S	All
(United Kingdom) Academy Motorsport	Ford Mustang GT4 (2024)	Ford Coyote 5.0 L V8	61	(Canada) Marco Signoretti	S	All
(United Kingdom) Academy Motorsport	Ford Mustang GT4 (2024)	Ford Coyote 5.0 L V8	62	(United Kingdom) Will Moore	S	All
(United Kingdom) Academy Motorsport	Ford Mustang GT4 (2024)	Ford Coyote 5.0 L V8	62	(United Kingdom) Matt Nicoll-Jones	S	All
(United Kingdom) Steller Motorsport	Audi R8 LMS GT4 Evo	Audi DAR 5.2 L V10	79	(United Kingdom) Jordan Albert	PA	1–4, 6–9
(United Kingdom) Steller Motorsport	Audi R8 LMS GT4 Evo	Audi DAR 5.2 L V10	79	(United Kingdom) Tim Docker	PA	1–4, 6–9
(United Kingdom) Optimum Motorsport	McLaren Artura GT4	McLaren M630 3.0 L Turbo V6	90	(United Kingdom) Jack Brown	S	All
(United Kingdom) Optimum Motorsport	McLaren Artura GT4	McLaren M630 3.0 L Turbo V6	90	(United Kingdom) Zac Meakin	S	All
(United Kingdom) Race Lab	McLaren Artura GT4	McLaren M630 3.0 L Turbo V6	95	(United Kingdom) Callum Davies	S	All
(United Kingdom) Race Lab	McLaren Artura GT4	McLaren M630 3.0 L Turbo V6	95	(India) Sai Sanjay	S	All
Entrylists:

Icon	Class
S	Silver Cup
PA	Pro-Am Cup
SA	Silver-Am Cup
Am	Am Cup

== Race results ==
Bold indicates overall winner for each car class (GT3 and GT4).

=== GT3 ===
Event	Circuit	Pole position	Pro-Am Winners	Silver-Am Winners	Am Winners
1	Oulton Park	(United Kingdom) No. 63 Barwell Motorsport	**(United Kingdom) No. 63 Barwell Motorsport**	(United Kingdom) No. 59 Garage 59	No entries
1	Oulton Park	(United Kingdom) Ricky Collard (United Kingdom) Rob Collard	**(United Kingdom) Ricky Collard** **(United Kingdom) Rob Collard**	(United Kingdom) Shaun Balfe (United Kingdom) Adam Smalley	No entries
2	Oulton Park	(United Kingdom) No. 78 Barwell Motorsport	**(United Kingdom) No. 78 Barwell Motorsport**	(United Kingdom) No. 59 Garage 59	No entries
2	Oulton Park	(United Kingdom) Alex Martin (United Kingdom) Sandy Mitchell	**(United Kingdom) Alex Martin** **(United Kingdom) Sandy Mitchell**	(United Kingdom) Shaun Balfe (United Kingdom) Adam Smalley	No entries
3	Silverstone	(Bahrain) No. 18 2 Seas Motorsport	(United Kingdom) No. 23 Team RJN	**(United Kingdom) No. 59 Garage 59**	No entries
3	Silverstone	(Germany) Maximilian Götz (Hong Kong) Kevin Tse	(United Kingdom) Chris Buncombe (United Kingdom) Jann Mardenborough	**(United Kingdom) Shaun Balfe** **(United Kingdom) Adam Smalley**	No entries
4	Donington Park	(United Kingdom) No. 78 Barwell Motorsport	**(United Kingdom) No. 78 Barwell Motorsport**	(United Kingdom) No. 59 Garage 59	No entries
4	Donington Park	(United Kingdom) Alex Martin (United Kingdom) Sandy Mitchell	**(United Kingdom) Alex Martin** **(United Kingdom) Sandy Mitchell**	(United Kingdom) Shaun Balfe (United Kingdom) Adam Smalley	No entries
5	Spa-Francorchamps	(Bahrain) No. 18 2 Seas Motorsport	**(Bahrain) No. 18 2 Seas Motorsport**	(United Kingdom) No. 59 Garage 59	No finishers
5	Spa-Francorchamps	(Germany) Maximilian Götz (Hong Kong) Kevin Tse	**(Germany) Maximilian Götz** **(Hong Kong) Kevin Tse**	(United Kingdom) Shaun Balfe (United Kingdom) Adam Smalley	No finishers
6	Snetterton	(United Kingdom) No. 63 Barwell Motorsport	**(United Kingdom) No. 78 Barwell Motorsport**	(United Kingdom) No. 8 Team Abba Racing	No entries
6	Snetterton	(United Kingdom) Ricky Collard (United Kingdom) Rob Collard	**(United Kingdom) Alex Martin** **(United Kingdom) Sandy Mitchell**	(United Kingdom) Richard Neary (United Kingdom) Sam Neary	No entries
7	Snetterton	(United Kingdom) No. 78 Barwell Motorsport	**(Bahrain) No. 18 2 Seas Motorsport**	(United Kingdom) No. 59 Garage 59	No entries
7	Snetterton	(United Kingdom) Alex Martin (United Kingdom) Sandy Mitchell	**(Germany) Maximilian Götz** **(Hong Kong) Kevin Tse**	(United Kingdom) Shaun Balfe (United Kingdom) Adam Smalley	No entries
8	Donington Park	(United Kingdom) No. 63 Barwell Motorsport	**(United Kingdom) No. 63 Barwell Motorsport**	(United Kingdom) No. 59 Garage 59	No entries
8	Donington Park	(United Kingdom) Ricky Collard (United Kingdom) Rob Collard	**(United Kingdom) Ricky Collard** **(United Kingdom) Rob Collard**	(United Kingdom) Shaun Balfe (United Kingdom) Adam Smalley	No entries
9	Brands Hatch	(United Kingdom) No. 2 Team RJN	**(United Kingdom) No. 2 Team RJN**	(United Kingdom) No. 8 Team Abba Racing	No entries
9	Brands Hatch	(United Kingdom) Alex Buncombe (United Kingdom) Josh Caygill	**(United Kingdom) Alex Buncombe** **(United Kingdom) Josh Caygill**	(United Kingdom) Richard Neary (United Kingdom) Sam Neary	No entries

=== GT4 ===
Event	Circuit	Pole position	Pro-Am Winners	Silver Winners
1	Oulton Park	(United Kingdom) No. 7 Forsetti Motorsport	(United Kingdom) No. 31 Team Parker Racing	**(United Kingdom) No. 7 Forsetti Motorsport**
1	Oulton Park	(United Arab Emirates) Jamie Day (United Kingdom) Mikey Porter	(United Kingdom) Charles Dawson (United Kingdom) Seb Morris	**(United Arab Emirates) Jamie Day** **(United Kingdom) Mikey Porter**
2	Oulton Park	(United Kingdom) No. 31 Team Parker Racing	**(United Kingdom) No. 31 Team Parker Racing**	(United Kingdom) No. 7 Forsetti Motorsport
2	Oulton Park	(United Kingdom) Charles Dawson (United Kingdom) Seb Morris	**(United Kingdom) Charles Dawson** **(United Kingdom) Seb Morris**	(United Arab Emirates) Jamie Day (United Kingdom) Mikey Porter
3	Silverstone	(United Kingdom) No. 90 Optimum Motorsport	(United Kingdom) No. 20 Mihiki Racing	**(United Kingdom) No. 90 Optimum Motorsport**
3	Silverstone	(United Kingdom) Jack Brown (United Kingdom) Zac Meakin	(United Kingdom) Ian Duggan (United Kingdom) Gordie Mutch	**(United Kingdom) Jack Brown** **(United Kingdom) Zac Meakin**
4	Donington Park	(United Kingdom) No. 56 DTO Motorsport	(United Kingdom) No. 47 Forsetti Motorsport	**(United Kingdom) No. 90 Optimum Motorsport**
4	Donington Park	(United Kingdom) Stuart Middleton (United Kingdom) Freddie Tomlinson	(United Kingdom) William Orton (United Kingdom) Marc Warren	**(United Kingdom) Jack Brown** **(United Kingdom) Zac Meakin**
5	Spa-Francorchamps	(United Kingdom) No. 56 DTO Motorsport	**(United Kingdom) No. 29 Century Motorsport**	(United Kingdom) No. 7 Forsetti Motorsport
5	Spa-Francorchamps	(United Kingdom) Stuart Middleton (United Kingdom) Freddie Tomlinson	**(United Kingdom) Ian Gough** **(United Kingdom) Tom Wrigley**	(United Arab Emirates) Jamie Day (United Kingdom) Mikey Porter
6	Snetterton	(United Kingdom) No. 56 DTO Motorsport	**(United Kingdom) No. 71 Century Motorsport**	(United Kingdom) No. 56 DTO Motorsport
6	Snetterton	(United Kingdom) Aston Millar (United Kingdom) Freddie Tomlinson	**(United Kingdom) Ravi Ramyead** **(United Kingdom) Charlie Robertson**	(United Kingdom) Aston Millar (United Kingdom) Freddie Tomlinson
7	Snetterton	(United Kingdom) No. 90 Optimum Motorsport	(United Kingdom) No. 47 Forsetti Motorsport	**(United Kingdom) No. 90 Optimum Motorsport**
7	Snetterton	(United Kingdom) Jack Brown (United Kingdom) Zac Meakin	(United Kingdom) William Orton (United Kingdom) Marc Warren	**(United Kingdom) Jack Brown** **(United Kingdom) Zac Meakin**
8	Donington Park	(United Kingdom) No. 7 Forsetti Motorsport	**(United Kingdom) No. 71 Century Motorsport**	(United Kingdom) No. 61 Academy Motorsport
8	Donington Park	(United Arab Emirates) Jamie Day (United Kingdom) Mikey Porter	**(United Kingdom) Ravi Ramyead** **(United Kingdom) Charlie Robertson**	(United States) Erik Evans (Canada) Marco Signoretti
9	Brands Hatch	(United Kingdom) No. 90 Optimum Motorsport	(United Kingdom) No. 58 CWS Engineering	**(United Kingdom) No. 90 Optimum Motorsport**
9	Brands Hatch	(United Kingdom) Jack Brown (United Kingdom) Zac Meakin	(United Kingdom) Tom Holland (United Kingdom) Colin White	**(United Kingdom) Jack Brown** **(United Kingdom) Zac Meakin**

== Championship standings ==
=== Scoring system ===
Length	1st	2nd	3rd	4th	5th	6th	7th	8th	9th	10th
1 hour	25	18	15	12	10	8	6	4	2	1
2+ hours	37.5	27	22.5	18	15	12	9	6	3	1.5

=== Drivers' championship ===
==== Overall ====
Pos.	Drivers	Team	OUL		SIL	DON	SPA	SNE		DON	BRH	Points
GT3
1	(United Kingdom) Ricky Collard (United Kingdom) Rob Collard	(United Kingdom) Barwell Motorsport	**1**	5	5	5	3	2	2	**1**	5	182
2	(United Kingdom) Alex Martin (United Kingdom) Sandy Mitchell	(United Kingdom) Barwell Motorsport	3	**1**	Ret	**1**	4	1	10	4	2	177
3	(United Kingdom) Shaun Balfe (United Kingdom) Adam Smalley	(United Kingdom) Garage 59	5	4	1	8	2	10	4	3	8	140
4	(United Kingdom) Phil Keen (United Kingdom) Ian Loggie	(Bahrain) 2 Seas Motorsport	2	3	10	3	5	4	13	5		103.5
5	(United Kingdom) Tom Gamble (United Kingdom) Mark Radcliffe	(United Kingdom) Optimum Motorsport	4	2	Ret	2	7	8	3	Ret	12	86.5
6	(United Kingdom) Marcus Clutton (United Kingdom) Morgan Tillbrook	(United Kingdom) Garage 59	7	28	4	4	9	WD	WD	Ret	3	76.5
7	(Germany) Maximilian Götz (Hong Kong) Kevin Tse	(Bahrain) 2 Seas Motorsport	13	10	**12**	7	1	9	1	12	Ret	75
8	(United Kingdom) Richard Neary (United Kingdom) Sam Neary	(United Kingdom) Team Abba Racing	11	8	2	13	Ret	3	7	DSQ	4	74.5
9	(United Kingdom) Jonathan Adam (Italy) Giacomo Petrobelli	(United Kingdom) Blackthorn	10	16	8	9	DSQ	11	5	2		53
10	(United Kingdom) Callum MacLeod (United Kingdom) Mike Price	(United Kingdom) Greystone GT	6	9	18	14	8	7	6	10	10	37.5
11	(United Kingdom) Carl Cavers (United Kingdom) Lewis Plato	(United Kingdom) Century Motorsport	17	17	14	12	Ret	12	8	6	7	31
12	(United Kingdom) Josh Rowledge (United Kingdom) Matt Topham	(United Kingdom) Blackthorn	21	Ret	19	16	6	6	9	9		25
13	(United Kingdom) Hugo Cook (United Kingdom) Sacha Kakad	(United Kingdom) J&S Racing	15	12	15	10	26	5	12	11	9	20.5
14	(United Kingdom) John Ferguson	(United Kingdom) RAM Racing	12	7	9	17	10	DSQ	DSQ	Ret		16.5
=	(Switzerland) Raffaele Marciello	(United Kingdom) RAM Racing	12	7	9	17	10					16.5
15	(United Kingdom) Simon Orange	(United Kingdom) Orange Racing powered by JMH	14	13	6	Ret	Ret				Ret	15
=	(United Kingdom) Tom Roche	(United Kingdom) Orange Racing powered by JMH	14	13	6	Ret	Ret					15
16	(United Kingdom) Dan Harper (United Kingdom) Michael Johnston	(United Kingdom) Century Motorsport	9	14	17	6						14
17	(United Kingdom) Martin Plowman (United States) Mark Smith	(United Kingdom) Paddock Motorsport	16	11	11	15	11	13	11	8	11	13
18	(United Kingdom) Chris Buncombe	(United Kingdom) Team RJN	8	6	3	Ret						12
=	(United Kingdom) Alex Buncombe	(United Kingdom) Team RJN	8	6	WD	Ret					1	12
19	(United Kingdom) Jessica Hawkins (United Kingdom) Andrew Howard	(United Kingdom) Beechdean AMR	18	15	16	11	Ret			7		9
–	(United Kingdom) Euan Hankey (United Kingdom) Lucky Khera	(United Kingdom) Race Lab			NC	Ret						0
–	(United Kingdom) Simon Watts	(United Kingdom) Team RJN			WD							0
–	(Germany) Max Hesse	(United Kingdom) RAM Racing						DSQ	DSQ	Ret		0
Drivers ineligible to score points
–	(United Kingdom) Josh Caygill	(United Kingdom) Team RJN									1	0
–	(United Kingdom) Jann Mardenborough	(United Kingdom) Team RJN			3							0
–	(United Kingdom) Andrew Gilbert (Spain) Fran Rueda	(United Kingdom) Optimum Motorsport			7							0
–	(United Kingdom) Darren Leung (Belgium) Dries Vanthoor	(United Kingdom) Century Motorsport			13							0
–	(United Kingdom) Chris Froggatt (Sweden) Alexander West	(United Kingdom) Sky - Tempesta Racing			WD							0
GT4
1	(United Kingdom) Jack Brown (United Kingdom) Zac Meakin	(United Kingdom) Optimum Motorsport	22	21	**20**	18	23	21	14	23	**13**	171.5
2	(United Arab Emirates) Jamie Day (United Kingdom) Mikey Porter	(United Kingdom) Forsetti Motorsport	**19**	20	21	24	14	17	15	**19**	14	164.5
3	(United Kingdom) Charles Dawson (United Kingdom) Seb Morris	(United Kingdom) Team Parker Racing	20	**18**	23	Ret	16	16	17	14	20	136
4	(United Kingdom) William Orton (United Kingdom) Marc Warren	(United Kingdom) Forsetti Motorsport	23	19	24	19	13	18	16	27	Ret	124
5	(United Kingdom) Ian Gough (United Kingdom) Tom Wrigley	(United Kingdom) Century Motorsport	29	24	29	26	12	22	24	15	19	84
6	(United Kingdom) Ravi Ramyead (United Kingdom) Charlie Robertson	(United Kingdom) Century Motorsport	24	Ret	31	Ret	WD	14	Ret	13		72.5
=	(United States) Erik Evans (Canada) Marco Signoretti	(United Kingdom) Academy Motorsport by Multimatic	25	23	25	31	15	Ret	18	17	23	72.5
8	(United Kingdom) Harry George (United States) Luca Hopkinson	(United Kingdom) RAM Racing	27	22	35	22	18	DSQ	DSQ	18	16	68
9	(United Kingdom) Alex Walker	(United Kingdom) Paddock Motorsport	28	27	28	21	17	20	20			51
10	(United Kingdom) Freddie Tomlinson	(France) Team CMR			27							45
10	(United Kingdom) Freddie Tomlinson	(United Kingdom) DTO Motorsport				**32**	19	15	Ret	28	18	45
11	(United Kingdom) Ian Duggan (United Kingdom) Gordie Mutch	(United Kingdom) Mahiki Racing	26	26	22	29	27	26	19	Ret	Ret	38.5
12	(United Kingdom) Tom Holland (United Kingdom) Colin White	(United Kingdom) CWS Engineering	30	Ret	33	25	20	23	25	20	17	31
13	(United Kingdom) Aston Millar	(United Kingdom) DTO Motorsport						15	Ret	28	18	30
14	(United Kingdom) Callum Davies (India) Sai Sanjay	(United Kingdom) Race Lab	31	Ret	30	27	22	28	22	DNS	15	27.5
15	(United Kingdom) Blake Angliss	(United Kingdom) Paddock Motorsport	28	27	28	21						27
16	(United Kingdom) Adam Hatfield	(United Kingdom) Paddock Motorsport					17	20	20			24
17	(United Kingdom) Kavi Jundu (United Kingdom) Dan Vaughan	(United Kingdom) Toyota Gazoo Racing UK	Ret	Ret	37	20	21	27	Ret			24
18	(United Kingdom) Matt Cowley (United Kingdom) Ed McDermott	(United Kingdom) Paddock Motorsport	WD	WD	34	Ret	24	24	21	16	Ret	22
19	(United Kingdom) Will Moore (United Kingdom) Matt Nicoll-Jones	(United Kingdom) Academy Motorsport by Multimatic	Ret	Ret	NC	23	25	19	Ret	Ret	Ret	20
20	(United Kingdom) Stuart Middleton	(France) Team CMR			27							15
20	(United Kingdom) Stuart Middleton	(United Kingdom) DTO Motorsport				**32**	19					15
21	(United Kingdom) Nathan Harrison (United Kingdom) Steven Lake	(United Kingdom) Mahiki Racing	32	25	32	28	Ret	25	23	26	22	8
22	(United Kingdom) Jordan Albert (United Kingdom) Tim Docker	(United Kingdom) Steller Motorsport	33	Ret	36	30		29	26	25	Ret	1.5
**Drivers ineligible to score points**
–	(United Kingdom) Carl Garnett (United Kingdom) Harley Haughton	(United Kingdom) Breakell Racing			26							0
Pos.	Drivers	Team	OUL		SIL	DON	SPA	SNE		DON	BRH	Points

Colour	Result
Gold	Winner
Silver	Second place
Bronze	Third place
Green	Points classification
Blue	Non-points classification
Blue	Non-classified finish (NC)
Purple	Retired, not classified (Ret)
Red	Did not qualify (DNQ)
Red	Did not pre-qualify (DNPQ)
Black	Disqualified (DSQ)
White	Did not start (DNS)
White	Withdrew (WD)
White	Race cancelled (C)
Blank	Did not practice (DNP)
Blank	Did not arrive (DNA)
Blank	Excluded (EX)

**Bold** indicates pole position

== See also ==
- 2024 GT World Challenge Europe
- 2024 GT World Challenge Europe Sprint Cup
- 2024 GT World Challenge Europe Endurance Cup
- 2024 GT World Challenge Asia
- 2024 GT World Challenge America
- 2024 GT World Challenge Australia
- 2024 Intercontinental GT Challenge
