= Mikey Porter =

British racing driver (born 2007)

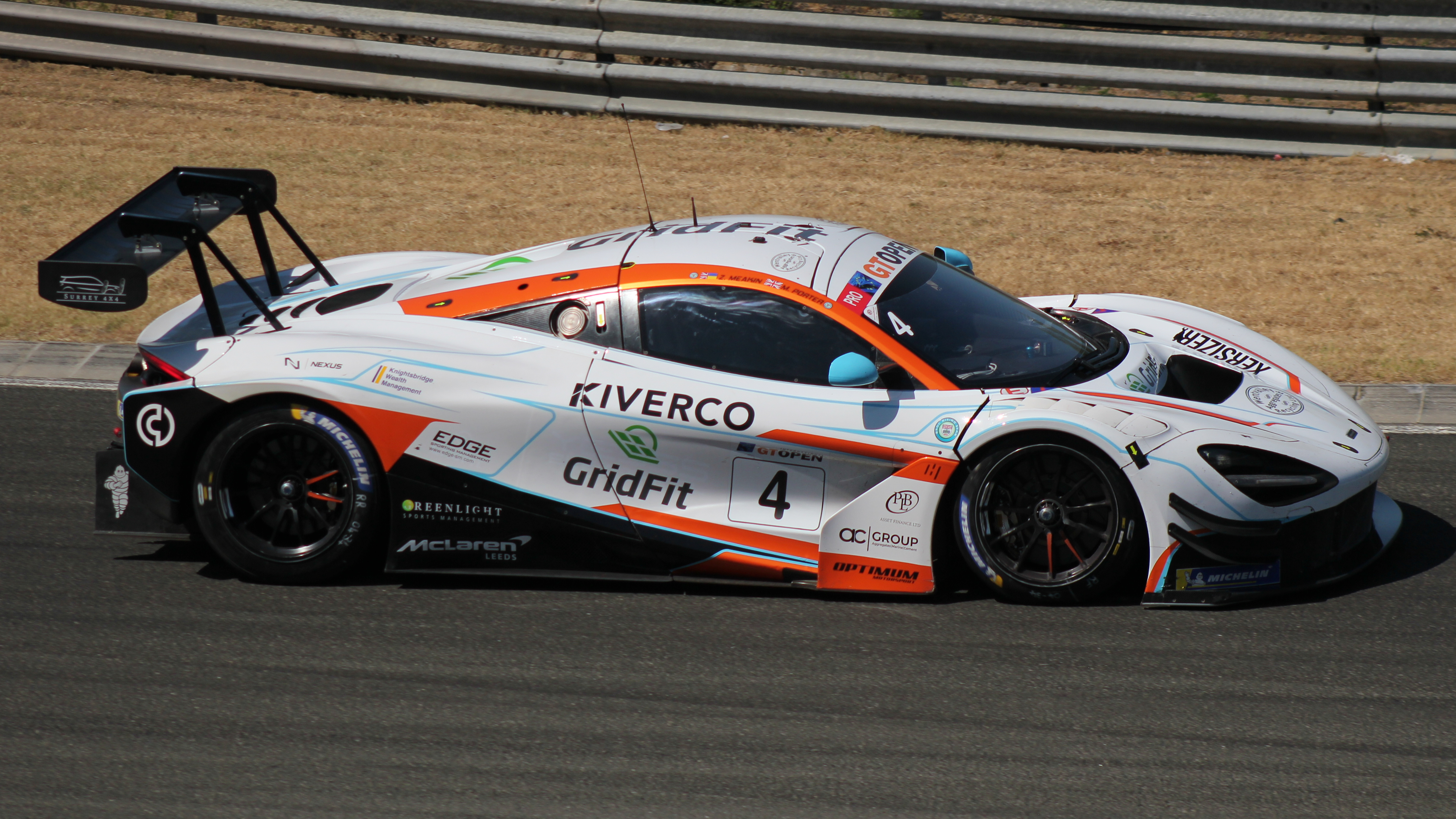
- Porter in 2025
- Nationality: (United Kingdom) British
- Born: Michael Porter; 27 May 2007 (age 19) Lingfield, Surrey, United Kingdom
- Categorisation: FIA Silver

Championship titles
- 2024 2024 2024: British GT Championship – GT4 Silver; GT Cup Championship – GTH; GT4 Winter Series – Pro

Michael Porter (born 27 May 2007) is a British racing driver who last competed in GT World Challenge Europe for Optimum Motorsport.

== Career ==
Porter made his car racing debut in 2022, racing in the final two rounds of the Ginetta Junior Championship for Preptech UK. After racing in the end-of-year Winter Championship for R Racing, Porter remained with them for the following year's main season, in which he scored nine podiums en route to a fourth-place points finish.

Stepping up to GT4 competition for 2024, Porter joined Forsetti Motorsport to race in the GT4 Winter Series, British GT and GT Cup Championships, as a candidate for the AMR Driver Academy. In the former, Porter took seven wins in the six-round season to clinch the GT4 Pro title at the finale in Barcelona. In the British GT Championship, Porter won the season-opening race at Oulton Park and scored four more podiums to end the season to secure runner-up honors overall, whilst also securing the GT4 Silver title. Meanwhile in the GT Cup Championship, Porter secured the GTH class title alongside Sam Neser and Matthew Higgins. During 2024, Porter also made one-off appearances in the GT4 European Series for the same team, as well as in the International GT Open for McLaren-fielding Optimum Motorsport.

At the beginning of 2025, Porter raced in the Middle East Trophy for Optimum Motorsport, finishing third overall at the 6 Hours of Abu Dhabi and second among the GT3 Pro entries. Porter raced in International GT Open for the rest of the year for the same team alongside Zac Meakin for their first full-season in the series. In the season-opening round at Algarve, the pair took their maiden series podium in race two by finishing second, a feat they repeated at the Hungaroring and Le Castellet to end the year eighth in points. In parallel, Porter raced in the Gold Cup of the GT World Challenge Europe Endurance Cup for the same team alongside Largim Ali and James Allen.

For the following year, Porter remained with Optimum for a dual campaign in both the GT World Challenge Europe Endurance and Sprint Cups, as a new addition to the McLaren GT3 Junior Driver Programme. Between the two campaigns, Porter found more success in the latter, where he was third in the Silver Cup standings with class wins at Brands Hatch and Barcelona. During 2026, Porter made a one-off return to British GT with the team, scoring a GT4 podium and a Silver class win at Spa.

== Racing record ==
=== Racing career summary ===
Season	Series	Team	Races	Wins	Poles	F/Laps	Podiums	Points	Position
2022	Ginetta Junior Championship	Preptech UK	6	0	0	0	0	36	26th
2022	Ginetta Junior Winter Championship	R Racing	4	0	0	0	1	79	6th
2023	Ginetta Junior Championship	R Racing	27	0	0	1	9	545	4th
2024	GT4 Winter Series – Pro	Forsetti Motorsport	18	7	7	4	17	119.01	**1st**
2024	British GT Championship – GT4	Forsetti Motorsport	9	1	2	0	7	164.5	**2nd**
2024	GT Cup Championship – GTH	Forsetti Motorsport						457	**1st**
2024	GT4 European Series – Silver	Forsetti Motorsport	2	0	0	0	0	4	23rd
2024	International GT Open	Optimum Motorsport	1	0	0	0	0	0	NC†
2025	Middle East Trophy – GT3	Optimum Motorsport	2	0	0	0	1	21	7th
2025	International GT Open	Optimum Motorsport	14	0	0	0	3	88	8th
2025	GT World Challenge Europe Endurance Cup	Optimum Motorsport	5	0	0	0	0	0	NC
2025	GT World Challenge Europe Endurance Cup – Silver	Optimum Motorsport	5	0	0	0	0	37	6th
2025–26	24H Series Middle East – GT3	Optimum Motorsport	2	0	0	0	0	2	23rd
2026	GT World Challenge Europe Endurance Cup	Optimum Motorsport	5	0	0	0	0	0	NC
2026	GT World Challenge Europe Endurance Cup – Silver	Optimum Motorsport	5	0	0	0	0	41	7th
2026	GT World Challenge Europe Sprint Cup	Optimum Motorsport	10	0	0	0	0	0	NC
2026	GT World Challenge Europe Sprint Cup – Silver	Optimum Motorsport	10	2	0	0	4	79.5	3rd
2026	British GT Championship – GT4	Optimum Motorsport	1	0	1	0	1	27	13th

=== Complete Ginetta Junior Championship results ===
(key) (Races in bold indicate pole position) (Races in italics indicate fastest lap)

Year	Team	1	2	3	4	5	6	7	8	9	10	11	12	13	14	15	16	17	18	19	20	21	22	23	24	25	26	27	DC	Points
2022	Preptech UK	DON; 1	DON; 2	DON; 3	BHI; 1	BHI; 2	BHI; 3	THR1; 1	THR1; 2	CRO; 1	CRO; 2	KNO; 1	KNO; 2	KNO; 3	SNE; 1	SNE; 2	SNE; 3	THR2; 1	THR2; 2	THR2; 3	SIL; 1; 17	SIL; 2; 8	SIL; 3; 14	BHGP; 1; 15	BHGP; 2; 18	BHGP; 3; 19			26th	36
2023	R Racing	OUL; 1; 5	OUL; 2; 10	OUL; 3; 5	SIL1; 1; 6	SIL1; 2; 9	SIL1; 3; 6	DON1; 1 Ret	DON1; 2; 4	DON1; 3; 2	SIL2; 1; 3	SIL2; 2; 4	SIL2; 3; 2	SIL2; 4; 5	SIL2; 5; 2	SIL2; 6; 6	SNE; 1; 8	SNE; 2; 2	SNE; 3; 2	CAD; 1; 2	CAD; 2; 8	CAD; 3; 2	BRH; 1; 5	BRH; 2; 3	BRH; 3; 6	DON2; 1 Ret	DON2; 2; 4	DON2; 3; 5	4th	545

=== Complete British GT Championship results ===
(key) (Races in bold indicate pole position in class) (Races in italics indicate fastest lap in class)

Year	Entrant	Chassis	Class	1	2	3	4	5	6	7	8	9	DC	Points
2024	Forsetti Motorsport	Aston Martin Vantage AMR GT4 Evo	GT4	**OUL**; **1**; 19	OUL; 2; 20	SIL; 21	DON; 24	SPA; 14	SNE; 1; 17	SNE; 2; 15	**DON**; 19	BRH; 14	2nd	164.5
2026	Optimum Motorsport	McLaren Artura GT4	GT4	SIL	OUL; 1	OUL; 2	**SPA**; 14	SNE; 1	SNE; 2	DON	BRH		13th	27

=== Complete International GT Open results ===
(key) (Races in bold indicate pole position) (Races in italics indicate fastest lap)

Year	Team	Car	Class	1	2	3	4	5	6	7	8	9	10	11	12	13	14	Pos.	Points
2024	Optimum Motorsport	McLaren 720S GT3 Evo	Pro	ALG; 1	ALG; 2	HOC; 1	HOC; 2	SPA	HUN; 1	HUN; 2	LEC; 1	LEC; 2	RBR; 1	RBR; 2	CAT; 1	CAT; 2	MNZ; 27	NC†	0
2025	Optimum Motorsport	McLaren 720S GT3 Evo	Pro	ALG; 1; 6	ALG; 2; 2	SPA; 4	HOC; 1; 4	HOC; 2; 7	HUN; 1; 2	HUN; 2; 9	LEC; 1; 6	LEC; 2; 2	RBR; 1; 19	RBR; 2; 13	CAT; 1; 5	CAT; 2; 5	MNZ; 25	8th	88

^{†} As Porter was a guest driver, he was ineligible to score points.

=== Complete GT World Challenge Europe results ===
==== GT World Challenge Europe Endurance Cup ====
(key) (Races in bold indicate pole position; results in italics indicate fastest lap)

Year	Team	Car	Class	1	2	3	4	5	6	7	Pos.	Points
2025	Optimum Motorsport	McLaren 720S GT3 Evo	Gold	LEC; 52	MNZ; 24	SPA; 6H; 43	SPA; 12H; 39	SPA; 24H; 39	NÜR; 29	CAT; 41	6th	37
2026	Optimum Motorsport	McLaren 720S GT3 Evo	Silver	LEC; Ret	MNZ; Ret	SPA; 6H; 30	SPA; 12H; 11	SPA; 24H; 17	NÜR; Ret	ALG; 19	7th	41

==== GT World Challenge Europe Sprint Cup ====
(key) (Races in bold indicate pole position; results in italics indicate fastest lap)

Year	Team	Car	Class	1	2	3	4	5	6	7	8	9	10	Pos.	Points
2026	Optimum Motorsport	McLaren 720S GT3 Evo	Silver	BRH; 1; 13	BRH; 2; 13	MIS; 1; 29	MIS; 2; 33	MAG; 1; 42	MAG; 2; 13	ZAN; 1; 25	ZAN; 2; 29	CAT; 1; 21	CAT; 2; 18	3rd	79.5
