= Jamie Day (racing driver) =

Racing driver (born 2005)

- Nationality: (United Kingdom) British (United Arab Emirates) Emirati (Note: Day is a British citizen who lives in Dubai and regularly competes under the Emirati flag.)
- Born: Jamie Alan Day; 17 August 2005 (age 21) United Kingdom
- Categorisation: FIA Silver

Championship titles
- 2025 2024 2024: GT World Challenge Europe Sprint Cup – Silver Cup; British GT Championship – GT4 Silver; GT4 Winter Series

Jamie Alan Day (born 17 August 2005) is a British racing driver who last competed under the Emirati flag in GT World Challenge Europe for Walkenhorst Motorsport and in ADAC GT Masters for Comtoyou Racing.

== Personal life ==
Day is the son of Xcel Motorsport team director Kevin Day. Day was born in the United Kingdom, but has lived in Dubai for most of his life.

== Career ==
Day began karting at the age of six. In his karting career which lasted until 2022, he most notably won the 2017 MSA Kartmasters GP in Mini Max and the 2019 FFSA Karting OK-J title. Day also was a race winner in the Champions of the Future, Karting European Championship and WSK Euro Series, while also being a factory driver for Leclerc by Lennox Racing.

Day made his single-seater debut in 2021, joining Xcel Motorsport to compete in the Formula 4 UAE Championship. In his maiden season in single-seaters, Day took his only win of the season at the second Yas Marina round and finished third at in race two Dubai, which helped him secure sixth in points. After finishing fifth in the Non-Championship Trophy Round later that year, Day returned to Xcel Motorsport for his sophomore season in the Formula 4 UAE Championship. Taking his first podium of the season in the season-opening round at Yas Marina, Day then scored only three points finished across the next four rounds, including a second-place finish at Dubai, on his way to 13th in points.

Day then switched to GT4 racing, joining R Racing to race in the British GT Championship. Driving alongside Josh Miller, the pair became the series' youngest winning pair by scoring class wins at Snetterton and Spa to secure third in the GT4 standings. At the end of 2022, Day also made a one-off appearance for Mirage Racing in the GT4 European Series at Barcelona. Remaining in GT4 competition for 2023, Day rejoined Mirage Racing to compete in his first full season in GT4 European Series. Racing in the Silver class alognside Ruben del Sarte for most of the season, the duo took a lone class podium at Spa and ended the year 15th in points.

Day then joined Forsetti Motorsport for 2024, winning the GT4 Winter Series with them at the start of the year, before remaining with them to race in the GT4 class of the British GT Championship. In his second season in the series, Day won the season-opening race at Oulton Park and scored four more podiums to end the season runner-up in the GT4 overall standings, as the Silver Cup champion. During 2024, Day also competed for Racing Spirit of Léman in the GT4 European Series, in which he scored three podiums in the final four races to finish fifth in the Silver Cup standings. Having made his GT3 debut earlier in 2024 with PROsport Racing in ADAC GT Masters, Day joined Earl Bamber Motorsport to race in the GT class for the last two rounds of the 2024–25 Asian Le Mans Series. In the four races he contested, Day took his first podium in GT3 competition in race two at Dubai before ending the season with a second-place finish at Yas Marina to secure fifth in points.

For the rest of 2025, Day joined Comtoyou Racing for a dual programme in both the GT World Challenge Europe Endurance and Sprint Cups after graduating from the AMR Driver Academy. Finishing 33rd in the Silver Cup standings of the former, Day found more success in the latter, scoring three class wins and two more podiums to secure the Silver Cup title at the season finale in Valencia alongside Kobe Pauwels. During 2025, Day also competed in GT World Challenge Australia for Volante Rosso Motorsport alongside Liam Talbot, scoring a lone win at Sandown on his debut round. Day returned EBM for the first round of the 2025–26 Asian Le Mans Series at Sepang, in which he scored a best result of seventh.

In 2026, Day joined Walkenhorst Motorsport for a dual campaign in the GT World Challenge Europe Endurance and Sprint Cups, as well as returning to Comtoyou for his first full season in ADAC GT Masters. In the Endurance Cup, Day took a best result of seventh at the 24 Hours of Spa, whereas in the Sprint Cup, he took seven out of ten podiums to secure runner-up honours in the Silver Cup with Mateo Villagomez. Paired up with Baudouin Detout in the latter, Day won from pole at the Nürburgring and took another podium at the Salzburgring to secure tenth in the overall standings.

== Karting record ==
=== Karting career summary ===
Season	Series	Team	Position
2014	Kartmasters British GP – IAME Cadet		30th
2015	LGM Series – IAME Cadet		42nd
2015	Super One Series – IAME Cadet	Eclipse Motorsport	33rd
2015	Euro Finale – Micro Max		2nd
2016	WSK Super Master Series – 60 Mini	Energy Corse	33rd
2016	BNL International Karting Series – Mini		14th
2016	Euro Finale – Mini Max Small		5th
2017	Rotax Euro Challenge – Rotax Junior	KR Sport	4th
2017	Karting Academy Trophy	Day, Kevin	10th
2017	Super One Series – Mini Max		5th
2017	Super One Series – OK-J		3rd
2017	Kartmasters British GP – Mini Max		1st
2017	MSA Kartmasters Grand Prix – OK-J		4th
2017	Karting World Championship – OK-J	Energy Corse	NC
2017	RMC Grand Finals – Mini Max	Al Ain Raceway	2nd
2018	WSK Super Master Series – OK-J	Energy Corse	65th
2018	South Garda Winter Cup – OK-J	Energy Corse	33rd
2018	Karting European Championship – OK-J	Energy Corse	33rd
2018	WSK Open Cup – OK-J	Energy Corse	18th
2018	Karting World Championship – OK-J	Energy Corse	NC
2018	WSK Final Cup – OK-J	Energy Corse	58th
2018	IAME International Final – X30 Junior	KR Sport	24th
2018	RMC Grand Finals – Junior Max	Al Ain Raceway	40th
2019	South Garda Winter Cup – OK-J	Lennox Racing Team	10th
2019	WSK Super Master Series – OK-J	Lennox Racing Team	3rd
2019	WSK Euro Series – OK-J	Lennox Racing Team	10th
2019	Coupe de France – OK-J	Lennox Racing Team	1st
2019	Karting European Championship – OK-J	Lennox Racing Team	6th
2019	Karting World Championship – OK-J	Lennox Racing Team	6th
2019	Rok Cup Superfinal – Super ROK	Lennox Racing Team	5th
2019	WSK Open Cup – OK	Lennox Racing Team	14th
2019	Italian Karting Championship – OK-J		10th
2019	SKUSA SuperNationals – X30 Junior		24th
2019	Kartmasters British GP – X30 Junior	KR Sport	24th
2020	WSK Super Master Series – OK	Leclerc By Lennox Racing	6th
2020	South Garda Winter Cup – OK	Leclerc By Lennox Racing	20th
2020	WSK Euro Series – OK	Leclerc By Lennox Racing	19th
2020	Champions of the Future – OK	Leclerc By Lennox Racing	15th
2020	Karting European Championship – OK	Leclerc By Lennox Racing	28th
2020	Karting World Championship – OK-J	Leclerc By Lennox Racing	NC
2020	Italian Karting Championship – OK	Birel ART Racing	13th
2021	IAME Winter Cup – X30 Senior	KR Sport	9th
2021	IAME Euro Series – X30 Senior	KR Sport	45th
2021	WSK Euro Series – KZ2	Leclerc By Lennox Racing	18th
2021	Karting European Championship – KZ2	Leclerc By Lennox Racing	32nd
2021	International Super Cup – KZ2	Leclerc By Lennox Racing	NC
2022	Kartmasters British GP – X30 Senior	Privateer	11th

== Racing record ==
=== Racing career summary ===
Season	Series	Team	Races	Wins	Poles	F/Laps	Podiums	Points	Position
2021	Formula 4 UAE Championship	Xcel Motorsport	20	1	0	0	2	142	6th
2021	Formula 4 UAE Championship – Trophy Round	Xcel Motorsport	1	0	0	0	0	—N/a	5th
2022	Formula 4 UAE Championship	Xcel Motorsport	20	0	0	0	2	48	13th
2022	British GT Championship – GT4	R Racing	9	2	1	0	4	156	**3rd**
2022	GT4 European Series – Silver	Mirage Racing	2	0	0	0	0	14	18th
2023	GT4 European Series – Silver	Mirage Racing	12	0	0	0	1	42	15th
2023	GT4 America Series – Silver	van der Steur Racing	2	0	0	0	0	18	12th
2024	GT4 Winter Series – Pro	Forsetti Motorsport	18	7	7	4	17	119.01	**1st**
2024	British GT Championship – GT4	Forsetti Motorsport	9	1	2	0	7	164.5	**2nd**
2024	GT4 European Series – Silver	Racing Spirit of Léman	12	0	0	0	3	91	5th
2024	ADAC GT Masters	PROsport Racing	2	0	0	0	0	0	NC†
2024	GT World Challenge Australia – Pro-Am	Volante Rosso Motorsport	0	0	0	0	0	0	NC
2024–25	Asian Le Mans Series – GT	Earl Bamber Motorsport	4	0	0	0	2	46	5th
2025	Middle East Trophy – GT3	Earl Bamber Motorsport	1	0	0	0	0	0	NC
2025	Middle East Trophy – GT3	Comtoyou Racing	1	0	0	0	0	0	NC
2025	GT World Challenge Europe Endurance Cup	Comtoyou Racing	5	0	0	0	0	0	NC
2025	GT World Challenge Europe Endurance Cup – Silver	Comtoyou Racing	5	0	0	0	0	8	33rd
2025	GT World Challenge Europe Sprint Cup	Comtoyou Racing	10	0	0	0	0	7	19th
2025	GT World Challenge Europe Sprint Cup – Silver	Comtoyou Racing	10	3	2	2	5	102	**1st**
2025	GT World Challenge Australia – Pro-Am	Volante Rosso Motorsport	4	1	1	0	1	38	14th
2025–26	Asian Le Mans Series – GT	Earl Bamber Motorsport	2	0	0	0	0	6	23rd
2025–26	24H Series Middle East – GT3	EBM	1	0	0	0	0	42	9th
2025–26	24H Series Middle East – GT3	Paradine Competition	1	0	0	0	0	42	9th
2026	GT World Challenge Europe Endurance Cup	natural elements by Walkenhorst Motorsport	4	0	0	0	0	7	28th
2026	GT World Challenge Europe Sprint Cup	Walkenhorst Motorsport	10	0	0	0	0	0	NC
2026	GT World Challenge Europe Sprint Cup – Silver	Walkenhorst Motorsport	10	0	0	0	7	88	**2nd**
2026	ADAC GT Masters	Comtoyou Racing	12	1	1	0	2	116	10th
2026	FIA GT World Cup	Comtoyou Racing						—N/a	

^{†} As Day was a guest driver, he was ineligible to score points.

=== Complete Formula 4 UAE Championship results ===
(key) (Races in bold indicate pole position) (Races in italics indicate fastest lap)

Year	Team	1	2	3	4	5	6	7	8	9	10	11	12	13	14	15	16	17	18	19	20	DC	Points
2021	Xcel Motorsport	DUB1; 1; 12	DUB1; 2; 4	DUB1; 3; 4	DUB1; 4 Ret	YMC1; 1; 4	YMC1; 2 Ret	YMC1; 3; 6	YMC1; 4; 9	DUB2; 1; 7	DUB2; 2 Ret	DUB2; 3; 11	DUB2; 4; 5	YMC2; 1; 5	YMC2; 2; 9	YMC2; 3; 5	YMC2; 4; 1	DUB3; 1; 9	DUB3; 2; 3	DUB3; 3; 5	DUB3; 4; 7	6th	142
2022	Xcel Motorsport	YMC1; 1 Ret	YMC1; 2; 15	YMC1; 3; 7	YMC1; 4; 3	DUB1; 1; 7	DUB1; 2; 9	DUB1; 3; 19	DUB1; 4; 15	DUB2; 1; 16	DUB2; 2; 10	DUB2; 3; 19	DUB2; 4; 11	DUB3; 1; 17	DUB3; 2; 19	DUB3; 3; 11	DUB3; 4; 2	YMC2; 1; 22	YMC2; 2; 21	YMC2; 3; 13	YMC2; 4; 13	13th	48

=== Complete British GT Championship results ===
(key) (Races in bold indicate pole position in class) (Races in italics indicate fastest lap in class)

Year	Entrant	Chassis	Class	1	2	3	4	5	6	7	8	9	DC	Pts
2022	R Racing	Aston Martin Vantage AMR GT4	GT4	OUL; 1; 17	OUL; 2; 18	SIL; 23	DON1; 22	SNE; 1; 17	**SNE**; **2**; 23	SPA; 13	BRH; 14	DON2; 15	3rd	156
2024	Forsetti Motorsport	Aston Martin Vantage AMR GT4 Evo	GT4	**OUL**; **1**; 19	OUL; 2; 20	SIL; 21	DON1; 24	SPA; 14	SNE; 1; 17	SNE; 2; 15	**DON2**; 19	BRH; 14	2nd	164.5

=== Complete GT4 European Series results ===
(key) (Races in bold indicate pole position) (Races in italics indicate fastest lap)

Year	Team	Car	Class	1	2	3	4	5	6	7	8	9	10	11	12	Pos	Points
2022	Mirage Racing	Aston Martin Vantage AMR GT4	Silver	IMO; 1	IMO; 2	LEC; 1	LEC; 2	MIS; 1	MIS; 2	SPA; 1	SPA; 2	HOC; 1	HOC; 2	CAT; 1; 13	CAT; 2; 12	18th	14
2023	Mirage Racing	Aston Martin Vantage AMR GT4	Silver	MNZ; 1; 13	MNZ; 2; 17	LEC; 1; 17	LEC; 2; 11	SPA; 1; 4	SPA; 2; 12	MIS; 1; 10	MIS; 2; 10	HOC; 1; 6	HOC; 2; 36†	CAT; 1; 37†	CAT; 2; 4	15th	42
2024	Racing Spirit of Léman	Aston Martin Vantage AMR GT4 Evo	Silver	LEC; 1; 7	LEC; 2; 14	MIS; 1; 8	MIS; 2; 24	SPA; 1; 4	SPA; 2 Ret	HOC; 1; 8	HOC; 2; 6	MNZ; 1; 3	MNZ; 2; 3	JED; 1; 4	JED; 2; 3	5th	91

=== Complete ADAC GT Masters results ===
(key) (Races in bold indicate pole position) (Races in italics indicate fastest lap)

Year	Team	Car	1	2	3	4	5	6	7	8	9	10	11	12	DC	Points
2024	PROsport Racing	Aston Martin Vantage AMR GT3	OSC; 1	OSC; 2	ZAN; 1	ZAN; 2	NÜR; 1	NÜR; 2	SPA; 1; 13	SPA; 2; 11	RBR; 1	RBR; 2	HOC; 1	HOC; 2	NC	0
2026	Comtoyou Racing	Aston Martin Vantage AMR GT3 Evo	RBR; 1; 8^{2}	RBR; 2; 10	ZAN; 1; 11	ZAN; 2; 8	LAU; 1; 9	LAU; 2; 6	NÜR; 1; 12	**NÜR**; **2**; 1^{1}	SAL; 1; 10	SAL; 2; 3	HOC; 1; 12	HOC; 2; 12^{2}	10th	116

=== Complete Asian Le Mans Series results ===
(key) (Races in bold indicate pole position) (Races in italics indicate fastest lap)

Year	Team	Class	Car	Engine	1	2	3	4	5	6	Pos.	Points
2024–25	Earl Bamber Motorsport	GT	Aston Martin Vantage AMR GT3	Aston Martin M177 4.0 L Turbo V8	SEP; 1	SEP; 2	DUB; 2; 20	DUB; 2; 3	ABU; 1; 5	ABU; 2; 2	5th	46
2025–26	Earl Bamber Motorsport	GT	Aston Martin Vantage AMR GT3	Aston Martin M177 4.0 L Turbo V8	SEP; 1; 7	SEP; 2; 14	DUB; 1	DUB; 2	ABU; 1	ABU; 2	23rd	6

=== Complete GT World Challenge Europe results ===
==== GT World Challenge Europe Endurance Cup ====
(key) (Races in bold indicate pole position) (Races in italics indicate fastest lap)

Year	Team	Car	Class	1	2	3	4	5	6	7	Pos.	Points
2025	Comtoyou Racing	Aston Martin Vantage AMR GT3 Evo	Silver	LEC; 36	**MNZ**; Ret	SPA; 6H; 62	SPA; 12H; 54	SPA; 24H; Ret	NÜR; 26	BAR; 49	33rd	8
2026	natural elements by Walkenhorst Motorsport	Aston Martin Vantage AMR GT3 Evo	Pro	LEC; WD	MNZ; 28	SPA; 6H; 32	SPA; 12H; 9	SPA; 24H; 7	NÜR; 16	ALG; 12	28th	7

==== GT World Challenge Europe Sprint Cup ====
(key) (Races in bold indicate pole position) (Races in italics indicate fastest lap)

Year	Team	Car	Class	1	2	3	4	5	6	7	8	9	10	Pos.	Points
2025	Comtoyou Racing	Aston Martin Vantage AMR GT3 Evo	Silver	BRH; 1; 27	BRH; 2; 14	ZAN; 1; 15	ZAN; 2; 8	MIS; 1; 17	MIS; 2; 9	MAG; 1; 7	**MAG**; **2**; 9	**VAL**; **1**; 11	VAL; 2; 17	1st	102
2026	Walkenhorst Motorsport	Aston Martin Vantage AMR GT3 Evo	Silver	BRH; 1; 16	BRH; 2; 20	MIS; 1; 14	MIS; 2; 16	MAG; 1; 24	MAG; 2; 26	ZAN; 1; 39	ZAN; 2; 19	CAT; 1; 26	CAT; 2; 15	2nd	88
