= 2022 6 Hours of Abu Dhabi =

Endurance automotive competition

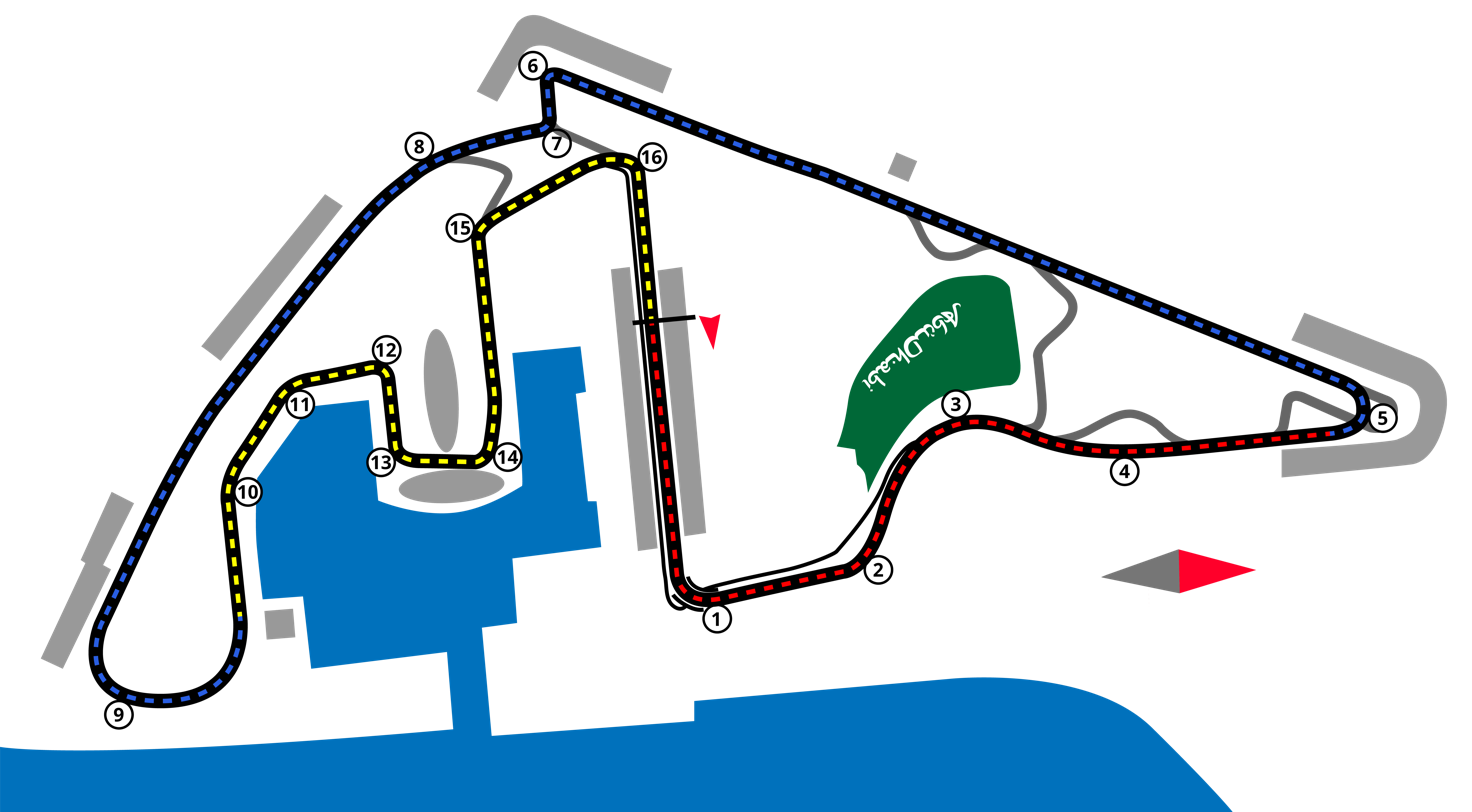
Yas Marina Circuit, Abu Dubai

The 2022 6 Hours of Abu Dhabi (formally known as the Hankook 6 Hours Abu Dhabi), was the 2nd running of the 6 Hours of Abu Dhabi, an endurance race that took place at the Yas Marina Circuit on 22 January 2022. The race was a non-championship round, as part of the 24H Series.

== Schedule ==
Date	Time (local: GST)	Event	Distance
Friday, 21 January	19:20	Free Practice (All cars)	-
Saturday, 22 January	09:50	Qualifying 1	-
Saturday, 22 January	10:10	Qualifying 2	-
Saturday, 22 January	14:25-20:45	Race	6 Hours

== Teams and Drivers ==
The entry list consisted of 32 cars; 19 were entered in GT and 13 were entered in TCE.

No.	Team	Car	Driver 1	Driver 2	Driver 3	Driver 4	Driver 5
GT3 (8 entries)
2	(Netherlands) JR Motorsport	BMW M6 GT3	(Netherlands) Ted van Viet	(Netherlands) Max Weering	-	-	-
10	(Germany) Leipert Motorsport	Lamborghini Huracán GT3 Evo	(United States) Jean-Francois Brunot	(China) Kerong Li	-	-	-
44	(Slovakia) ARC Bratislava	Lamborghini Huracán GT3	(Slovakia) Matej Konôpka	(Slovakia) Miro Konôpka	-	-	-
48	(Netherlands) Saalocin by KoxRacing	Porsche 911 GT3 R (991)	(Netherlands) Peter Kox	(Netherlands) Stéphane Kox	(Netherlands) Nico Pronk	-	-
86	(Austria) Baron Motorsport	Ferrari 488 GT3 Evo 2020	(Austria) Philipp Baron	(Zimbabwe) Axcil Jefferies	(Austria) Ernst Kirchmayr	(Denmark) Mikkel Mac	(Poland) Roman Ziermian
88	(Italy) LP Racing	Lamborghini Huracán GT3 Evo	(Taiwan) Evan Chen	(United States) Thomas Yu Lee	(Italy) Lorenzo Veglia	-	-
92	(Germany) Herberth Motorsport	Porsche 911 GT3 R (991)	(Germany) Jürgen Häring	(Germany) Markus Neuhofer	(Germany) Alfred Renauer	-	-
710	(Germany) Leipert Motorsport	Lamborghini Huracán Super Trofeo Evo 2	(United States) Gregg Gorski	(Luxembourg) Gabriele Rindone	(United States) Gerhard Watzinger	-	-
992 (8 entries)
923	(Germany) Huber Racing	Porsche 992 GT3 Cup	(Italy) Enrico Fulgenzi	(Germany) Matthias Hoffsümmer	(Luxembourg) Gabriele Rindone	-	-
924	(Germany) Huber Racing	Porsche 992 GT3 Cup	(Poland) Maciej Blazek	(France) Clément Mateu	(Germany) Mark Wallenwein	-	-
928	(Germany) HRT Performance	Porsche 992 GT3 Cup	(Australia) Theo Koundouris	(Australia) Sergio Pires	(Australia) Marcel Zalloua	-	-
929	(Germany) HRT Performance	Porsche 992 GT3 Cup	(Finland) Olli Kangas	(Finland) Simo Kangas	-	-	-
930	(Germany) HRT Performance	Porsche 992 GT3 Cup	(Finland) Kari-Pekka Laaksonen	(Finland) Jari Ollila	-	-	-
944	(Germany) ID Racing	Porsche 992 GT3 Cup	(Germany) Christof Langer	(United Kingdom) Steven Liquorish	(Netherlands) Bas Schouten	-	-
977	(United Arab Emirates) RABDAN Motorsport by ID Racing	Porsche 992 GT3 Cup	(United Arab Emirates) Saif Alameri	(United Arab Emirates) Salem Alketbi	(United Arab Emirates) Saeed Almheiri	-	-
979	(Belgium) Speed Lover	Porsche 992 GT3 Cup	(Belgium) Wim Meulders	(Belgium) Rik Renmans	-	-	-
991 (3 entries)
915	(Portugal) P21Motorsport	Porsche 991 GT3 II Cup	(Portugal) Nuno Caetnovich	(Portugal) Afonso Vaz	-	-	-
921	(Portugal) P21Motorsport	Porsche 991 GT3 II Cup	(Portugal) Jose Monroy	(Portugal) Rui Silva	-	-	-
960	(United Arab Emirates) TT Racing	Porsche 991 GT3 II Cup	(United Kingdom) John Murray	(United Kingdom) Phil Quaife	(United Kingdom) Jonathan Simmonds	-	-
TG (7 entries)
202	(France) Les Deux Arbres	Ligier JS2 R	(France) Christophe Bouchut	(France) Hugo Valente	-	-	-
205	(United Kingdom) Valluga	Porsche 718 Cayman GT4 RS Clubsport	(United Kingdom) Bradley Ellis	(United Kingdom) Charlie Hollings	Leo Loucas	Rhea Loucas	-
215	(France) SK Racing	Ligier JS2 R	(France) Jérôme Dacosta	(France) Franck Eburderie	(France) Franck Lavergne	(France) Franco Lemma	-
217	(Spain) PCR Sport	Ligier JS2 R	(Spain) Juan Andújar	(Spain) Harriet Arruabarrena	(Spain) Jacobo García	-	-
223	(Luxembourg) LAMERA by Racetrack	Lamera GT	(France) Frederic Delpit	(France) Levet Louis-Marie	(Luxembourg) Laurent Ozkan	(Luxembourg) Tommy Rollinger	-
278	(United Kingdom) CWS Engineering	Ginetta G55 Supercup	(United States) Matthew Ibrahim	(United Kingdom) Kristian Prosser	-	-	-
478	(United Kingdom) CWS Engineering	Ginetta G56 GT4	(United Kingdom) Darren Leung	(Australia) Robert Thomson	(United Kingdom) Colin White	-	-
TCR (6 entries)
117	(Spain) PCR Sport	Cupra León Competición TCR	(Spain) Vincente Dasi	(Spain) Jacobo García	(Spain) Josep Parera	-	-
133	(Hungary) Zengő Motorsport	Cupra León TCR	(Hungary) Szabolcs Gál	(Hungary) Tamás Horváth	(Hungary) KISMA	(Hungary) Csaba Tóth	(Hungary) Zoltán Zengő
188	(Belgium) AC Motorsport	Audi RS 3 LMS TCR (2017)	(Netherlands) Luc Breukers	(Germany) Patrick Sing	(Latvia) Ivars Vallers	-	-
199	(Belgium) AC Motorsport	Audi RS 3 LMS TCR (2017)	(United Kingdom) Ricky Coomber	(United Kingdom) Charles Dawson	(Belgium) Arnaud Quede	(Brazil) Gustavo Xavier	-
218	(Denmark) Sally Racing	Cupra León TCR	(Denmark) Morten Eriksen	(Denmark) Mik Henriksen	(Denmark) Daniel Zefier	-	-
219	(Denmark) Sally Racing	Cupra León TCR	(Denmark) Ole Kiltgaard	(Denmark) Mikkel Obel	(Denmark) Lasse Poulsen	-	-

== Results ==
=== Qualifying ===
Pole positions in each class are denoted in bold.

Pos.	Class	No.	Team	Q1	Q2	Avg
1	**GT3**	**86**	**(Austria) Baron Motorsport**	**1:53.706**	**1:55.961**	**1:54.833**
2	GT3	48	(Netherlands) Saalocin by KoxRacing	1:54.366	1:56.232	1:55.299
3	GT3	88	(Italy) LP Racing	1:56.790	1:54.480	1:55.635
4	GT3	92	(Germany) Herberth Motorsport	1:59.341	1:54.016	1:56.678
5	GT3	710	(Germany) Leipert Motorsport	1:57.031	1:56.712	1:56.871
6	GT3	44	(Slovakia) ARC Bratislava	1:58.554	1:56.456	1:57.505
7	GT3	2	(Netherlands) JR Motorsport	2:00.924	1:54.356	1:57.640
8	**992**	**923**	**(Germany) Huber Racing**	**1:59.127**	**1:56.294**	**1:57.710**
9	992	924	(Germany) Huber Racing	1:59.750	1:57.544	1:58.647
10	992	977	(United Arab Emirates) RABDAN Motorsport by ID Racing	2:00.403	1:58.042	1:59.222
11	992	944	(Germany) ID Racing	2:00.312	1:59.654	1:59.983
12	**991**	**960**	**(United Arab Emirates) TT Racing**	**1:58.016**	**2:02.366**	**2:00.191**
13	992	979	(Belgium) Speed Lover	2:01.329	2:00.629	2:00.979
14	992	929	(Germany) HRT Performance	1:59.825	2:03.935	2:01.880
15	GT3	10	(Germany) Leipert Motorsport	2:07.939	1:58.892	2:03.415
16	**TG**	**478**	**(United Kingdom) CWS Engineering**	**2:02.767**	**2:04.532**	**2:03.649**
17	992	930	(Germany) HRT Performance	2:01.605	2:06.564	2:04.084
18	992	928	(Germany) HRT Performance	2:10.735	2:00.044	2:05.389
19	TG	278	(United Kingdom) CWS Engineering	2:06.992	2:05.811	2:06.401
20	991	921	(Portugal) P21Motorsport	2:06.100	2:09.682	2:07.896
21	**TCR**	**133**	**(Hungary) Zengő Motorsport**	**2:07.906**	**2:09.372**	**2:08.639**
22	TG	217	(Spain) PCR Sport	2:08.814	2:08.854	2:08.834
23	TG	223	(Luxembourg) LAMERA by Racetrack	2:09.522	2:10.873	2:10.197
24	TG	205	(United Kingdom) Valluga	2:08.615	2:12.230	2:10.422
25	TCR	219	(Denmark) Sally Racing	2:12.308	2:09.024	2:10.666
26	TCR	188	(Belgium) AC Motorsport	2:09.440	2:12.662	2:11.051
27	TCR	117	(Spain) PCR Sport	2:16.099	2:10.021	2:13.060
28	TCR	218	(Denmark) Sally Racing	2:12.117	2:14.042	2:13.079
29	TG	202	(France) Les Deux Arbres	No Time	2:03.906	2:03.906
30	TCR	199	(Belgium) AC Motorsport	No Time	2:09.014	2:09.014
31	TG	215	(France) SK Racing	No Time	No Time	No Time
DNS	991	915	(Portugal) P21Motorsport	No Time	No Time	No Time

=== Race ===
Class winners are denoted in bold.

Pos	Class	No.	Team	Drivers	Chassis	Time/Reason	Laps
Pos	Class	No.	Team	Drivers	Engine	Time/Reason	Laps
1	**GT3**	**86**	**(Austria) Baron Motorsport**	**(Austria) Philipp Baron** **(Zimbabwe) Axcil Jefferies** **(Austria) Ernst Kirchmayr** **(Denmark) Mikkel Mac** **(Poland) Roman Ziermian**	**Ferrari 488 GT3 Evo 2020**	**6:04:16.725**	**166**
1	**GT3**	**86**	**(Austria) Baron Motorsport**	**(Austria) Philipp Baron** **(Zimbabwe) Axcil Jefferies** **(Austria) Ernst Kirchmayr** **(Denmark) Mikkel Mac** **(Poland) Roman Ziermian**	**Ferrari 3.9 L Twin-Turbo V8**	**6:04:16.725**	**166**
2	GT3	2	(Netherlands) JR Motorsport	(Netherlands) Ted van Viet (Netherlands) Max Weering	BMW M6 GT3	+1 Lap	165
2	GT3	2	(Netherlands) JR Motorsport	(Netherlands) Ted van Viet (Netherlands) Max Weering	BMW 4.4 L Turbo V8	+1 Lap	165
3	GT3	48	(Netherlands) Saalocin by KoxRacing	(Netherlands) Peter Kox (Netherlands) Stéphane Kox (Netherlands) Nico Pronk	Porsche 911 GT3 R (991)	+1 Lap	165
3	GT3	48	(Netherlands) Saalocin by KoxRacing	(Netherlands) Peter Kox (Netherlands) Stéphane Kox (Netherlands) Nico Pronk	Porsche 4.0 L Flat-6	+1 Lap	165
4	GT3	92	(Germany) Herberth Motorsport	(Germany) Jürgen Häring (Germany) Markus Neuhofer (Germany) Alfred Renauer	Porsche 911 GT3 R (991)	+1 Lap	165
4	GT3	92	(Germany) Herberth Motorsport	(Germany) Jürgen Häring (Germany) Markus Neuhofer (Germany) Alfred Renauer	Porsche 4.0 L Flat-6	+1 Lap	165
5	GT3	10	(Germany) Leipert Motorsport	(United States) Jean-Francois Brunot (China) Kerong Li	Lamborghini Huracán GT3 Evo	+2 Laps	164
5	GT3	10	(Germany) Leipert Motorsport	(United States) Jean-Francois Brunot (China) Kerong Li	Lamborghini 5.2 L V10	+2 Laps	164
6	GT3	44	(Slovakia) ARC Bratislava	(Slovakia) Matej Konôpka (Slovakia) Miro Konôpka	Lamborghini Huracán GT3	+2 Laps	164
6	GT3	44	(Slovakia) ARC Bratislava	(Slovakia) Matej Konôpka (Slovakia) Miro Konôpka	Lamborghini 5.2 L V10	+2 Laps	164
7	**992**	**923**	**(Germany) Huber Racing**	**(Italy) Enrico Fulgenzi** **(Germany) Matthias Hoffsümmer** **(Luxembourg) Gabriele Rindone**	**Porsche 992 GT3 Cup**	**+3 Laps**	**163**
7	**992**	**923**	**(Germany) Huber Racing**	**(Italy) Enrico Fulgenzi** **(Germany) Matthias Hoffsümmer** **(Luxembourg) Gabriele Rindone**	**Porsche 4.0 L Flat-6**	**+3 Laps**	**163**
8	992	977	(United Arab Emirates) RABDAN Motorsport by ID Racing	(United Arab Emirates) Saif Alameri (United Arab Emirates) Salem Alketbi (United Arab Emirates) Saeed Almheiri	Porsche 992 GT3 Cup	+4 Laps	162
8	992	977	(United Arab Emirates) RABDAN Motorsport by ID Racing	(United Arab Emirates) Saif Alameri (United Arab Emirates) Salem Alketbi (United Arab Emirates) Saeed Almheiri	Porsche 4.0 L Flat-6	+4 Laps	162
9	GT3	710	(Germany) Leipert Motorsport	(United States) Gregg Gorski (Luxembourg) Gabriele Rindone (United States) Gerhard Watzinger	Lamborghini Huracán Super Trofeo Evo 2	+6 Laps	160
9	GT3	710	(Germany) Leipert Motorsport	(United States) Gregg Gorski (Luxembourg) Gabriele Rindone (United States) Gerhard Watzinger	Lamborghini 5.2 L V10	+6 Laps	160
10	992	928	(Germany) HRT Performance	(Australia) Theo Koundouris (Australia) Sergio Pires (Australia) Marcel Zalloua	Porsche 992 GT3 Cup	+8 Laps	158
10	992	928	(Germany) HRT Performance	(Australia) Theo Koundouris (Australia) Sergio Pires (Australia) Marcel Zalloua	Porsche 4.0 L Flat-6	+8 Laps	158
11	**TG**	**202**	**(France) Les Deux Arbres**	**(France) Christophe Bouchut** **(France) Hugo Valente**	**Ligier JS2 R**	**+8 Laps**	**158**
11	**TG**	**202**	**(France) Les Deux Arbres**	**(France) Christophe Bouchut** **(France) Hugo Valente**	**Ford Cyclone 3.7 L V6**	**+8 Laps**	**158**
12 DNF	992	944	(Germany) ID Racing	(Germany) Christof Langer (United Kingdom) Steven Liquorish (Netherlands) Bas Schouten	Porsche 992 GT3 Cup	+9 Laps	157
12 DNF	992	944	(Germany) ID Racing	(Germany) Christof Langer (United Kingdom) Steven Liquorish (Netherlands) Bas Schouten	Porsche 4.0 L Flat-6	+9 Laps	157
13	992	929	(Germany) HRT Performance	(Finland) Olli Kangas (Finland) Simo Kangas	Porsche 992 GT3 Cup	+9 Laps	157
13	992	929	(Germany) HRT Performance	(Finland) Olli Kangas (Finland) Simo Kangas	Porsche 4.0 L Flat-6	+9 Laps	157
14	992	979	(Belgium) Speed Lover	(Belgium) Wim Meulders (Belgium) Rik Renmans	Porsche 992 GT3 Cup	+10 Laps	156
14	992	979	(Belgium) Speed Lover	(Belgium) Wim Meulders (Belgium) Rik Renmans	Porsche 4.0 L Flat-6	+10 Laps	156
15	**TCR**	**188**	**(Belgium) AC Motorsport**	**(Netherlands) Luc Breukers** **(Germany) Patrick Sing** **(Latvia) Ivars Vallers**	**Audi RS 3 LMS TCR (2017)**	**+13 Laps**	**153**
15	**TCR**	**188**	**(Belgium) AC Motorsport**	**(Netherlands) Luc Breukers** **(Germany) Patrick Sing** **(Latvia) Ivars Vallers**	**Volkswagen EA888 2.0 L I4**	**+13 Laps**	**153**
16	992	930	(Germany) HRT Performance	(Finland) Kari-Pekka Laaksonen (Finland) Jari Ollila	Porsche 992 GT3 Cup	+14 Laps	152
16	992	930	(Germany) HRT Performance	(Finland) Kari-Pekka Laaksonen (Finland) Jari Ollila	Porsche 4.0 L Flat-6	+14 Laps	152
17	TG	278	(United Kingdom) CWS Engineering	(United States) Matthew Ibrahim (United Kingdom) Kristian Prosser	Ginetta G55 Supercup	+15 Laps	151
17	TG	278	(United Kingdom) CWS Engineering	(United States) Matthew Ibrahim (United Kingdom) Kristian Prosser	Ford Cyclone 3.7 L V6	+15 Laps	151
18	TG	223	(Luxembourg) LAMERA by Racetrack	(France) Frederic Delpit (France) Levet Louis-Marie (Luxembourg) Laurent Ozkan (Luxembourg) Tommy Rollinger	Lamera GT	+15 Laps	151
18	TG	223	(Luxembourg) LAMERA by Racetrack	(France) Frederic Delpit (France) Levet Louis-Marie (Luxembourg) Laurent Ozkan (Luxembourg) Tommy Rollinger	Volvo 2.5 L I5	+15 Laps	151
19	TG	205	(United Kingdom) Valluga	(United Kingdom) Bradley Ellis (United Kingdom) Charlie Hollings; Leo Loucas; Rhea Loucas	Porsche 718 Cayman GT4 RS Clubsport	+16 Laps	150
19	TG	205	(United Kingdom) Valluga	(United Kingdom) Bradley Ellis (United Kingdom) Charlie Hollings; Leo Loucas; Rhea Loucas	Porsche 3.8 L Flat-6	+16 Laps	150
20	TCR	133	(Hungary) Zengő Motorsport	(Hungary) Szabolcs Gál (Hungary) Tamás Horváth (Hungary) KISMA (Hungary) Csaba Tóth (Hungary) Zoltán Zengő	Cupra León TCR	+17 Laps	149
20	TCR	133	(Hungary) Zengő Motorsport	(Hungary) Szabolcs Gál (Hungary) Tamás Horváth (Hungary) KISMA (Hungary) Csaba Tóth (Hungary) Zoltán Zengő	Volkswagen EA888 2.0 L I4	+17 Laps	149
21	TCR	117	(Spain) PCR Sport	(Spain) Vincente Dasi (Spain) Jacobo García (Spain) Josep Parera	Cupra León Competición TCR	+17 Laps	149
21	TCR	117	(Spain) PCR Sport	(Spain) Vincente Dasi (Spain) Jacobo García (Spain) Josep Parera	Volkswagen EA888 2.0 L I4	+17 Laps	149
22	TCR	219	(Denmark) Sally Racing	(Denmark) Ole Kiltgaard (Denmark) Mikkel Obel (Denmark) Lasse Poulsen	Cupra León TCR	+18 Laps	148
22	TCR	219	(Denmark) Sally Racing	(Denmark) Ole Kiltgaard (Denmark) Mikkel Obel (Denmark) Lasse Poulsen	Volkswagen EA888 2.0 L I4	+18 Laps	148
23	TG	478	(United Kingdom) CWS Engineering	(United Kingdom) Darren Leung (Australia) Robert Thomson (United Kingdom) Colin White	Ginetta G56 GT4	+18 Laps	148
23	TG	478	(United Kingdom) CWS Engineering	(United Kingdom) Darren Leung (Australia) Robert Thomson (United Kingdom) Colin White	Ginetta 6.2 L V8	+18 Laps	148
24	TCR	199	(Belgium) AC Motorsport	(United Kingdom) Ricky Coomber (United Kingdom) Charles Dawson (Belgium) Arnaud Quede (Brazil) Gustavo Xavier	Audi RS 3 LMS TCR (2017)	+21 Laps	145
24	TCR	199	(Belgium) AC Motorsport	(United Kingdom) Ricky Coomber (United Kingdom) Charles Dawson (Belgium) Arnaud Quede (Brazil) Gustavo Xavier	Volkswagen EA888 2.0 L I4	+21 Laps	145
25 DNF	991	921	(Portugal) P21Motorsport	(Portugal) Jose Monroy (Portugal) Rui Silva	Porsche 991 GT3 II Cup	+33 Laps	133
25 DNF	991	921	(Portugal) P21Motorsport	(Portugal) Jose Monroy (Portugal) Rui Silva	Porsche 4.0 L Flat-6	+33 Laps	133
26 DNF	TCR	218	(Denmark) Sally Racing	(Denmark) Morten Eriksen (Denmark) Mik Henriksen (Denmark) Daniel Zefier	Cupra León TCR	+34 Laps	132
26 DNF	TCR	218	(Denmark) Sally Racing	(Denmark) Morten Eriksen (Denmark) Mik Henriksen (Denmark) Daniel Zefier	Volkswagen EA888 2.0 L I4	+34 Laps	132
27	TG	215	(France) SK Racing	(France) Jérôme Dacosta (France) Franck Eburderie (France) Franck Lavergne (France) Franco Lemma	Ligier JS2 R	+34 Laps	132
27	TG	215	(France) SK Racing	(France) Jérôme Dacosta (France) Franck Eburderie (France) Franck Lavergne (France) Franco Lemma	Ford Cyclone 3.7 L V6	+34 Laps	132
28 DNF	991	960	(United Arab Emirates) TT Racing	(United Kingdom) John Murray (United Kingdom) Phil Quaife (United Kingdom) Jonathan Simmonds	Porsche 991 GT3 II Cup	+51 Laps	115
28 DNF	991	960	(United Arab Emirates) TT Racing	(United Kingdom) John Murray (United Kingdom) Phil Quaife (United Kingdom) Jonathan Simmonds	Porsche 4.0 L Flat-6	+51 Laps	115
29 DNF	TG	217	(Spain) PCR Sport	(Spain) Juan Andújar (Spain) Harriet Arruabarrena (Spain) Jacobo García	Ligier JS2 R	+83 Laps	83
29 DNF	TG	217	(Spain) PCR Sport	(Spain) Juan Andújar (Spain) Harriet Arruabarrena (Spain) Jacobo García	Ford Cyclone 3.7 L V6	+83 Laps	83
30 DNF	992	924	(Germany) Huber Racing	(Poland) Maciej Blazek (France) Clément Mateu (Germany) Mark Wallenwein	Porsche 992 GT3 Cup	+115 Laps	51
30 DNF	992	924	(Germany) Huber Racing	(Poland) Maciej Blazek (France) Clément Mateu (Germany) Mark Wallenwein	Porsche 4.0 L Flat-6	+115 Laps	51
31 DNF	GT3	88	(Italy) LP Racing	(Taiwan) Evan Chen (United States) Thomas Yu Lee (Italy) Lorenzo Veglia	Lamborghini Huracán GT3 Evo	+118 Laps	48
31 DNF	GT3	88	(Italy) LP Racing	(Taiwan) Evan Chen (United States) Thomas Yu Lee (Italy) Lorenzo Veglia	Lamborghini 5.2 L V10	+118 Laps	48
DNS	991	915	(Portugal) P21Motorsport	(Portugal) Nuno Caetnovich (Portugal) Afonso Vaz	Porsche 991 GT3 II Cup	+166 Laps	0
DNS	991	915	(Portugal) P21Motorsport	(Portugal) Nuno Caetnovich (Portugal) Afonso Vaz	Porsche 4.0 L Flat-6	+166 Laps	0
