= James Wallis (racing driver) =

British racing driver (born 2005)

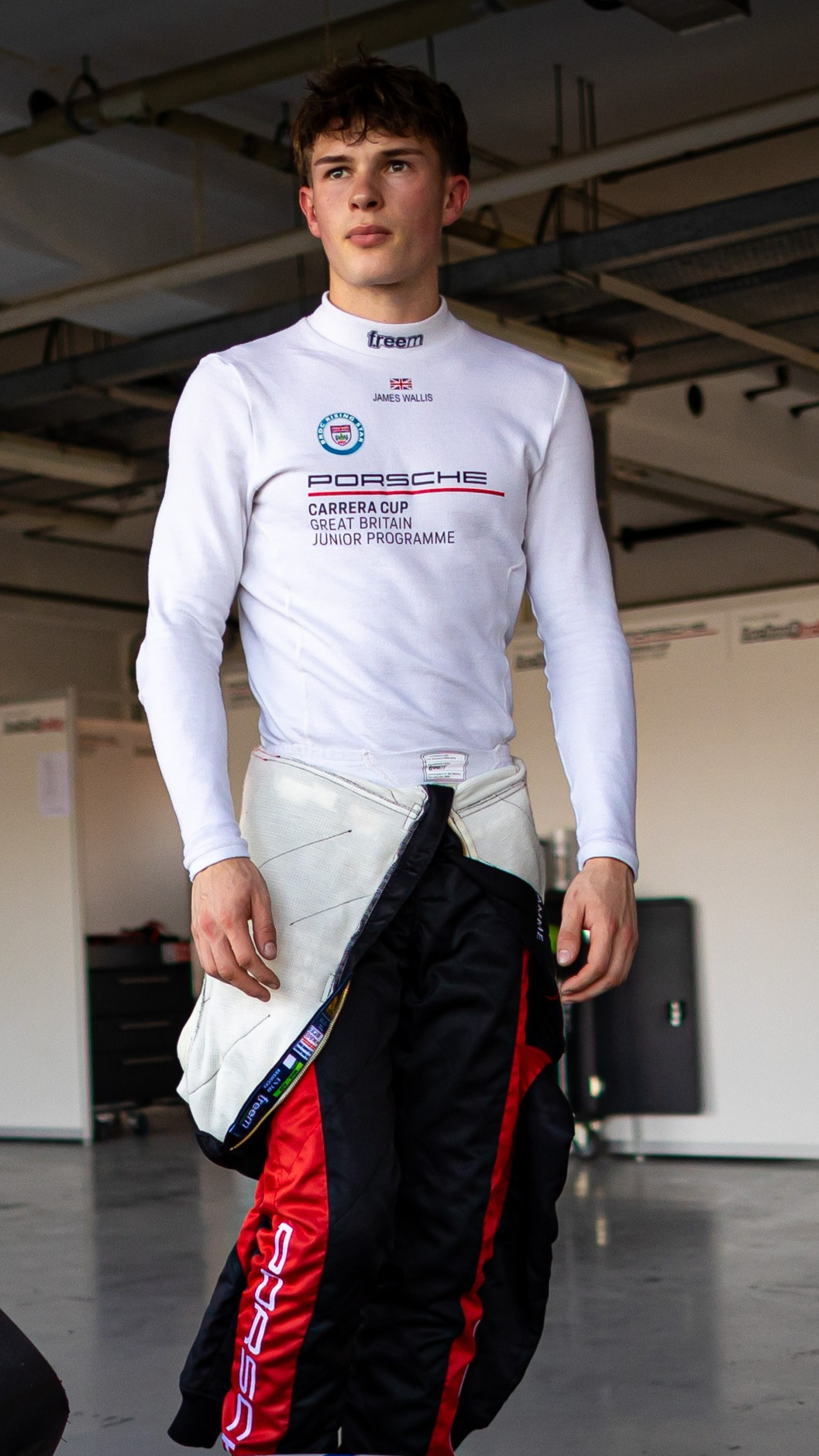
- Wallis in 2024
- Nationality: (United Kingdom) British
- Born: 11 October 2005 (age 21) Cheltenham, United Kingdom

Porsche Carrera Cup Great Britain career
- Debut season: 2024
- Current team: JTR
- Car number: 50
- Starts: 22 (23 entries)
- Wins: 1
- Podiums: 5
- Poles: 0
- Fastest laps: 0
- Best finish: 7th in 2024

Previous series
- 2024–25 2024 2023 2023 2023 2021 2019–21: Porsche Carrera Cup Middle East; Porsche Supercup; International GT Open; GT Cup Championship; British GT Championship; BRSCC Ford Fiesta Junior Championship; Junior Saloon Car Championship

Awards
- 2024–25: Porsche Carrera Cup GB Junior Driver

James Wallis (born 12 October 2005 in Cheltenham) is a British racing driver who currently competes in the 2026 - Lamborghini Super Trofeo North America. In 2025, Wallis competed in the Porsche Carrera Cup Great Britain for JTR, and in the 2025 Porsche Carrera Cup Italia for BeDriver.

== Awards and honours ==
In November 2023, at Porsche's 'Night of Motorsport' awards, Wallis was announced as the Porsche Carrera Cup Great Britain Junior Driver for the 2024 and 2025 seasons. This award includes a financial contribution of £85,000 towards his racing budget for each season, along with comprehensive support and development opportunities from Porsche.

== Career ==
=== Junior Sallon Car Championship ===
Wallis's racing journey commenced in the Junior Saloon Car Championship, where he participated from 2019 to 2021. In 2021, he secured the title of Junior Oval Racing Champion and was named Fiesta Junior Rookie Champion.

=== BRSCC Ford Fiesta Junior Championship ===
In 2021, Wallis joined the BRSCC Ford Fiesta Junior Championship. He had a successful season, with one win and eight podiums to finish second in the championship behind Jenson Brickley.

=== British GT Championship ===
In 2023, Wallis joined the British GT Championship driving the No. 50 Mercedes-AMG GT4 for Drivetac in the GT4 category. He would be paired with Irish driver Sam Maher-Loughnan. Following round one held at Oulton Park, Wallis moved to the GT3 category with Drivetac, joining Chris Hart to drive a Mercedes-AMG GT3 Evo for the team. Wallis and Hart competed in the Silver Cup and won a race in class at Brands Hatch. The duo finished fourth in the Silver Cup and 19th overall in the championship.

=== GT Cup Championship ===
==== 2023 ====
Alongiside his programme in the British GT Championship, Wallis joined the 2023 GT Cup Championship driving the No. 50 Mercedes-AMG GT3 Evo for DriveTac. He would once again be joined by Sam Maher-Loughnan. The pair had a successful start to the season with a second place finish in the first race. In race two however, they would not be able to start the race. Wallis and Maher-Loughnan quickly bounced back, with two wins in a row to finish the first round at Oulton Park. The pair would get their first pole of the season in the next race at Brands Hatch, and they went on to win the race making it three wins in a row. The remaining three races at Brands Hatch saw mixed results for Wallis and Maher-Loughnan, with a retirement in race two after starting on pole, another second place, and another retirement. In the next round at Snetterton, they would finish fifth in races one and four, while also finishing second in race three and getting their fourth win of the season in race three. Wallis would not compete in the next two races at Oulton Park, but returned to the championship with a different team. He made a mid-season switch to 7TSIX for races 15–18 at Silverstone, driving their No. 76 McLaren 720S GT3 alongside Paul Rogers. Wallis and Rogers would have a successful first two races, finishing in second and third in races one and two respectively. The pair would struggle in the remaining two races, finishing 18th and seventh in races three and four respectively. Despite only competing in 16 out of the 26 races in the championship, Wallis still finished third in the GT3 class championship.

=== International GT Open ===
Mid-way through the 2023 International GT Open season, Wallis entered round 6 of the series at Monza with German team GetSpeed driving their No. 6 Mercedes-AMG GT3 Evo. In race one, he finished on the podium in third. His fortunes wouldn't translate in race two however, as he would retire during the race.

=== Porsche Carrera Cup Middle East ===
==== 2024 ====
In 2024, Wallis made his debut in the 2024 Porsche Carrera Cup Middle East at the Dubai Autodrome driving in an entry supported by Porsche. He finished fifth and seventh overall, but last in class in both races.

==== 2025 ====
Wallis returned for the 2025 Porsche Carrera Cup Middle East season thanks to his Porsche Carrera Cup Great Britain Junior Driver status. Although he didn't win any races, Wallis would still have a successful season, finishing on the podium in every single race he competed in, and finishing second in the championship.

=== Porsche Carrera Cup Great Britain ===
==== 2024 ====
In November 2023, Porsche chose Wallis to be the Porsche Carrera Cup Great Britain Junior Driver for the 2024 and 2025 seasons of the championship. This award of £85,000 towards his racing budget allowed Wallis to entere the 2024 Porsche Carrera Cup Great Britain with JTR for the full-season. He would have a decent season with nine points finishes and three podiums.

==== 2025 ====
Wallis returned to the series for the 2025 season, once again driving for JTR.

=== Porsche Carrera Cup Italia ===
==== 2025 ====
Alongside his campaign in the 2025 Porsche Carrera Cup Great Britain, Wallis joined Italian team BeDriver to race full-time in the 2025 Porsche Carrera Cup Italia.

=== Porsche Supercup ===
==== 2024 ====
Mid-way through the 2024 Porsche Supercup, Wallis entered in a one-off entry in round four at Silverstone driving for JTR, where he finished 19th.

== Racing record ==
=== Racing career summary ===
Season	Series	Team	Races	Wins	Poles	F/Laps	Podiums	Points	Position
2019	Junior Saloon Car Championship	N/A	2	0	0	0	0	26	26th
2020	Junior Saloon Car Championship	JCW Racing	13	0	0	0	0	89	19th
2021	Junior Saloon Car Championship	JCW Racing	10	0	0	0	1	112	19th
2021	BRSCC Ford Fiesta Junior Championship	N/A	14	1	0	2	8	478	**2nd**
2023	British GT Championship - GT3	Drivetac	6	0	0	0	0	15	19th
2023	British GT Championship - GT3 Silver	Drivetac	6	1	0	0	2	120.5	4th
2023	British GT Championship - GT4	Drivetac	2	0	0	0	0	20	9th
2023	GT Cup Championship - GT3	DriveTac powered by Track Focused	11	4	2	2	7	188	**3rd**
2023	GT Cup Championship - GT3	7TSIX	2	0	0	0	2	188	**3rd**
2023	International GT Open	GetSpeed	2	0	0	0	1	10	20th
2023-24	Porsche Carrera Cup Middle East	Porsche Junior GB	2	0	0	0	0	21	16th
2024	Porsche Supercup	JTR	1	0	0	0	0	0	NC†
2024	Porsche Carrera Cup Great Britain - Pro	JTR	16	0	0	0	3	44	7th
2024-25	Porsche Carrera Cup Middle East	Porsche Junior GB	8	0	0	1	8	188	**2nd**
2024-25	Porsche Carrera Cup Middle East	BWT Junior Racing	2	0	0	1	2	188	**2nd**
2025	Porsche Carrera Cup Italy	BeDriver	2	0	0	0	0	6	29th
2025	Porsche Carrera Cup Great Britain - Pro	JTR	6	1	0	0	2	39*	**2nd***
2025-26	Porsche Carrera Cup Middle East	Mtech Competition	2	1	0	0	1	30	15th
2026	Lamborghini Super Trofeo North America - Pro	Wayne Taylor Racing	12	0	0	0	2	71	7th

† As Wallis was a guest driver, he was ineligible to score championship points.
^{*} Season still in progress.

=== Complete British GT Championship results ===
(key) (Races in bold indicate pole position) (Races in italics indicate fastest lap)

Year	Team	Car	Class	1	2	3	4	5	6	7	8	9	DC	Points
2023	Drivetac	Mercedes-AMG GT4	GT4 - Silver	OUL; 1; 6	OUL; 2; 4	SIL	DON1	SNE; 1	SNE; 2	ALG	BRH	DON2	9th	20
2023	Drivetac	Mercedes-AMG GT3 Evo	GT3 - Silver	OUL; 1	OUL; 2	SIL; 2	DON1; 4	SNE; 1; 5	SNE; 2; 5	ALG; 4	BRH; 1	DON2	4th	120.5

=== Complete GT Cup Championship results ===
(key) (Races in bold indicate pole position) (Races in italics indicate fastest lap)

Year	Team	Car	Class	1	2	3	4	5	6	7	8	9	10	11	12	13	14	15	16	17	18	19	20	21	22	23	24	25	26	DC	Points
2023	DriveTac powered by Track Focused	Mercedes-AMG GT3 Evo	GT3	DON1; 1; 2	DON1; 2 DNS	DON1; 3; 1	DON1; 4; 1	**BRH**; **1**; 1	**BRH**; **2** Ret	BRH; 3; 2	BRH; 4 Ret	SNE1; 1; 5	SNE1; 2; 2	SNE1; 3; 1	SNE1; 4; 5	OUL; 1	OUL; 2													3rd	188
2023	7TSIX	McLaren 720S GT3	GT3															SIL; 1; 2	SIL; 2; 3	SIL; 3; 18	SIL; 4; 7	DON2; 1	DON2; 2	DON2; 3	DON2; 4	SNE2; 1	SNE2; 2	SNE2; 3	SNE2; 4	3rd	188

=== Complete International GT Open results ===
(key) (Races in bold indicate pole position) (Races in italics indicate fastest lap)

Year	Team	Car	Class	1	2	3	4	5	6	7	8	9	10	11	12	13	DC	Points
2023	GetSpeed	Mercedes-AMG GT3 Evo	GT3 - Pro	POR; 1	POR; 2	SPA	HUN; 1	HUN; 2	LEC; 1	LEC; 2	RBR; 1	RBR; 2	MNZ; 1; 3	MNZ; 2 Ret	CAT; 1	CAT; 1	20th	10

=== Complete Porsche Supercup results ===
(key) (Races in bold indicate pole position) (Races in italics indicate fastest lap)

Year	Team	1	2	3	4	5	6	7	8	Pos.	Points
2024	JTR	IMO	MON	RBR	SIL; 19	HUN	SPA	ZAN	MNZ	NC†	0

^{†}As Wallis was a guest driver, he was ineligible for points.

=== Complete Porsche Carrera Cup Middle East results ===
(key) (Races in bold indicate pole position) (Races in italics indicate fastest lap)

Year	Team	Class	1	2	3	4	5	6	7	8	9	10	11	12	Pos.	Points
2024	Porsche Junior Great Britain	Pro	BHR1; 1	BHR1; 2	BHR1; 3	BHR1; 4	DUB; 1	DUB; 2	YAS; 1; 5	YAS; 2; 5	BHR2; 1	BHR2; 2	JED; 1	JED; 2	9th	21
2025	Porsche Junior Great Britain	Pro	BHR1; 1; 3	BHR1; 2; 3	QAT; 1; 3	QAT; 2; 3	DUB; 1; 2	DUB; 2; 2	YAS; 1; 2	YAS; 2; 3	BHR2; 1	BHR2; 2	JED; 1; 2	JED; 2; 2	2nd	188

=== Complete Porsche Carrera Cup Great Britain results ===
(key) (Races in bold indicate pole position) (Races in italics indicate fastest lap)

Year	Team	1	2	3	4	5	6	7	8	9	10	11	12	13	14	15	16	17	Pos.	Points
2024	JTR	DON1; 1; 7	DON1; 2 C†	BHI; 1 Ret	BHI; 2; 3	BHI; 3; 15	THR; 1; 10	THR; 2; 12	CRO; 1; 6	CRO; 2; 6	KNO; 1; 6	KNO; 2; 5	DON2; 1; 11	DON2; 2 Ret	SIL; 1 Ret	SIL; 2; 5	BHGP; 2; 4	BHGP; 3; 2	7th	44
2025	JTR	DNN; 1; 4	DNN; 2; 4	SNE; 1; 1	SNE; 2; 7	THR; 1; 3	THR; 2; 4	CRO; 1	CRO; 2	KNO; 1	KNO; 2	DNGP; 1	DNGP; 2	SIL; 1	SIL; 2	BRH; 2	BRH; 3		2nd*	39*

† Race was cancelled.
^{*} Season still in progress.

=== Complete Porsche Carrera Cup Italia results ===
(key) (Races in bold indicate pole position) (Races in italics indicate fastest lap)

Year	Team	1	2	3	4	5	6	7	8	9	10	11	12	Pos.	Points
2025	BeDriver	MIS1; 1; 19	MIS1; 2; 10	VAL; 1	VAL; 2	MUG; 1	MUG; 2	IMO1; 1	IMO1; 2	MIS2; 1	MIS2; 2	MNZ; 1	MNZ; 2	20th*	6*

^{*} Season still in progress.
