= 2023 British GT Championship =

Sports car racing season

The 2023 British GT Championship (known for sponsorship reasons as the 2023 Intelligent Money British GT Championship) is the 31st British GT Championship, a sports car championship promoted by the SRO Motorsports Group. The season began on 8 April at Oulton Park and will end on 22 October at Donington Park.

== Calendar ==
The calendar was unveiled on 29 July 2022. In a change from the 2022 schedule, the annual overseas round at Spa was moved to Portimão.

Round	Circuit	Length	Date
1	(United Kingdom) Oulton Park, Cheshire	60 min	8–10 April
2	(United Kingdom) Oulton Park, Cheshire	60 min	8–10 April
3	(United Kingdom) Silverstone Circuit, Northamptonshire	180 min	6–7 May
4	(United Kingdom) Donington Park, Leicestershire	120 min	27–28 May
5	(United Kingdom) Snetterton Circuit, Norfolk	60 min	17–18 June
6	(United Kingdom) Snetterton Circuit, Norfolk	60 min	17–18 June
7	Algarve International Circuit, Portimão, Portugal	180 min	22–23 July
8	(United Kingdom) Brands Hatch, Kent	120 min	9–10 September
9	(United Kingdom) Donington Park, Leicestershire	120 min	21–22 October

== Entry list ==
=== GT3 ===
Team	Car	Engine	No.	Drivers	Class	Rounds
(Bahrain) 2 Seas Motorsport	Mercedes-AMG GT3 Evo	Mercedes-AMG M159 6.2 L V8	1	(United Kingdom) Ian Loggie	PA	All
(Bahrain) 2 Seas Motorsport	Mercedes-AMG GT3 Evo	Mercedes-AMG M159 6.2 L V8	1	(Andorra) Jules Gounon	PA	1–6, 8–9
(Bahrain) 2 Seas Motorsport	Mercedes-AMG GT3 Evo	Mercedes-AMG M159 6.2 L V8	1	(United Kingdom) Phil Keen	PA	7
(Bahrain) 2 Seas Motorsport	Mercedes-AMG GT3 Evo	Mercedes-AMG M159 6.2 L V8	4	(United Kingdom) James Cottingham	PA	All
(Bahrain) 2 Seas Motorsport	Mercedes-AMG GT3 Evo	Mercedes-AMG M159 6.2 L V8	4	(United Kingdom) Jonathan Adam	PA	1–8
(Bahrain) 2 Seas Motorsport	Mercedes-AMG GT3 Evo	Mercedes-AMG M159 6.2 L V8	4	(Switzerland) Philip Ellis	PA	9
(United Kingdom) Greystone GT	Mercedes-AMG GT3 Evo	Mercedes-AMG M159 6.2 L V8	3	(United Kingdom) Callum MacLeod	PA	1–6, 8–9
(United Kingdom) Greystone GT	Mercedes-AMG GT3 Evo	Mercedes-AMG M159 6.2 L V8	3	(United Kingdom) Mike Price	PA	1–6, 8–9
(United Kingdom) Greystone GT	McLaren 720S GT3 Evo	McLaren M840T 4.0 L Turbo V8	24	(Estonia) Andrey Borodin	PA	1–7
(United Kingdom) Greystone GT	McLaren 720S GT3 Evo	McLaren M840T 4.0 L Turbo V8	24	(United Kingdom) Oliver Webb	PA	1–7
(United Kingdom) Greystone GT	McLaren 720S GT3 Evo	McLaren M840T 4.0 L Turbo V8	84	(United Kingdom) Andrew Gilbert	PA	3
(United Kingdom) Greystone GT	McLaren 720S GT3 Evo	McLaren M840T 4.0 L Turbo V8	84	(Spain) Fran Rueda	PA	3
(United Kingdom) Team Abba Racing	Mercedes-AMG GT3 1–4; Mercedes-AMG GT3 Evo 5–6	Mercedes-AMG M159 6.2 L V8	8	(United Kingdom) Richard Neary	S	1–6, 8–9
(United Kingdom) Team Abba Racing	Mercedes-AMG GT3 1–4; Mercedes-AMG GT3 Evo 5–6	Mercedes-AMG M159 6.2 L V8	8	(United Kingdom) Sam Neary	S	1–6, 8–9
(United Kingdom) Paddock Motorsport	McLaren 720S GT3 1–2; McLaren 720S GT3 Evo 3–7	McLaren M840T 4.0 L Turbo V8	11	(United Kingdom) Martin Plowman	PA	All
(United Kingdom) Paddock Motorsport	McLaren 720S GT3 1–2; McLaren 720S GT3 Evo 3–7	McLaren M840T 4.0 L Turbo V8	11	(United States) Mark Smith	PA	All
(United Kingdom) Race Lab	McLaren 720S GT3 Evo	McLaren M840T 4.0 L Turbo V8	13	(United Kingdom) Euan Hankey	PA	1–7
(United Kingdom) Race Lab	McLaren 720S GT3 Evo	McLaren M840T 4.0 L Turbo V8	13	(United Kingdom) Lucky Khera	PA	1–7
(United Kingdom) Race Lab	McLaren 720S GT3 Evo	McLaren M840T 4.0 L Turbo V8	42	(United Kingdom) Iain Campbell	S	All
(United Kingdom) Race Lab	McLaren 720S GT3 Evo	McLaren M840T 4.0 L Turbo V8	42	(United Kingdom) James Kell	S	All
(United Kingdom) RAM Racing	Mercedes-AMG GT3 Evo	Mercedes-AMG M159 6.2 L V8	15	(United Kingdom) John Ferguson	PA	All
(United Kingdom) RAM Racing	Mercedes-AMG GT3 Evo	Mercedes-AMG M159 6.2 L V8	15	(Switzerland) Raffaele Marciello	PA	All
(United Kingdom) Blackthorn	Aston Martin Vantage AMR GT3	Aston Martin 4.0 L Turbo V8	19	(Switzerland) Claude Bovet	S	3
(United Kingdom) Blackthorn	Aston Martin Vantage AMR GT3	Aston Martin 4.0 L Turbo V8	19	(United Kingdom) David McDonald	S	3
(United Kingdom) Fox Motorsport	Lamborghini Huracán GT3 Evo 2	Lamborghini 5.2 L V10	25	(United Kingdom) Abbie Eaton	S	9
(United Kingdom) Fox Motorsport	Lamborghini Huracán GT3 Evo 2	Lamborghini 5.2 L V10	25	(United Kingdom) John Seale	S	9
(United Kingdom) / Optimum Motorsport (Note: Car No. 27 entered as Optimum Motorsport and Car No. 70 entered as Inception Racing.); (United Kingdom) / Inception Racing	McLaren 720S GT3 Evo	McLaren M840T 4.0 L Turbo V8	27	(United Kingdom) Rob Bell	PA	All
(United Kingdom) / Optimum Motorsport; (United Kingdom) / Inception Racing	McLaren 720S GT3 Evo	McLaren M840T 4.0 L Turbo V8	27	(United Kingdom) Mark Radcliffe	PA	All
(United Kingdom) / Optimum Motorsport; (United Kingdom) / Inception Racing	McLaren 720S GT3 Evo	McLaren M840T 4.0 L Turbo V8	70	(United Kingdom) Ben Barnicoat	PA	3
(United Kingdom) / Optimum Motorsport; (United Kingdom) / Inception Racing	McLaren 720S GT3 Evo	McLaren M840T 4.0 L Turbo V8	70	(United States) Brendan Iribe	PA	3
(United Kingdom) Drivetac	Mercedes-AMG GT3 Evo	Mercedes-AMG M159 6.2 L V8	50	(United Kingdom) Chris Hart	S	3–8
(United Kingdom) Drivetac	Mercedes-AMG GT3 Evo	Mercedes-AMG M159 6.2 L V8	50	(United Kingdom) James Wallis	S	3–8
(United Kingdom) Team Parker Racing	Porsche 911 GT3 R (991)	Porsche 4.0 L Flat-6	64	(United Kingdom) Charles Bateman	S	3
(United Kingdom) Team Parker Racing	Porsche 911 GT3 R (991)	Porsche 4.0 L Flat-6	64	(United Kingdom) Alex Martin	S	3
(United Kingdom) Team Parker Racing	Porsche 911 GT3 R (992)	Porsche 4.2 L Flat-6	66	(United Kingdom) Nick Jones	PA	3
(United Kingdom) Team Parker Racing	Porsche 911 GT3 R (992)	Porsche 4.2 L Flat-6	66	(United Kingdom) Scott Malvern	PA	3
(United Kingdom) Orange Racing powered by JMH	McLaren 720S GT3 Evo	McLaren M840T 4.0 L Turbo V8	67	(United Kingdom) Simon Orange	PA	1–3, 5–6, 7, 9
(United Kingdom) Orange Racing powered by JMH	McLaren 720S GT3 Evo	McLaren M840T 4.0 L Turbo V8	67	(United Kingdom) Michael O'Brien	PA	1–3, 5–6, 7, 9
(United Kingdom) Barwell Motorsport	Lamborghini Huracán GT3 Evo 2	Lamborghini 5.2 L V10	72	(United Kingdom) Mark Sansom	S	All
(United Kingdom) Barwell Motorsport	Lamborghini Huracán GT3 Evo 2	Lamborghini 5.2 L V10	72	(United Kingdom) Will Tregurtha	S	All
(United Kingdom) Barwell Motorsport	Lamborghini Huracán GT3 Evo 2	Lamborghini 5.2 L V10	78	(United Kingdom) Shaun Balfe	PA	All
(United Kingdom) Barwell Motorsport	Lamborghini Huracán GT3 Evo 2	Lamborghini 5.2 L V10	78	(United Kingdom) Sandy Mitchell	PA	All
(United Kingdom) 7TSIX	Mercedes-AMG GT3 Evo	Mercedes-AMG M159 6.2 L V8	76	(United Kingdom) Tim Creswick	S	7
(United Kingdom) 7TSIX	Mercedes-AMG GT3 Evo	Mercedes-AMG M159 6.2 L V8	76	(Finland) Konsta Lappalainen	S	7
(United Kingdom) Enduro Motorsport	McLaren 720S GT3 Evo	McLaren M840T 4.0 L Turbo V8	77	(United Kingdom) Marcus Clutton	PA	1–6, 9
(United Kingdom) Enduro Motorsport	McLaren 720S GT3 Evo	McLaren M840T 4.0 L Turbo V8	77	(United Kingdom) Morgan Tillbrook	PA	1–4, 9
(United Kingdom) Enduro Motorsport	McLaren 720S GT3 Evo	McLaren M840T 4.0 L Turbo V8	77	(United Kingdom) Matt Topham	PA	5–6
(United Kingdom) Enduro Motorsport	Aston Martin Vantage AMR GT3	Aston Martin 4.0 L Turbo V8	77	(United Kingdom) Marcus Clutton	PA	7
(United Kingdom) Enduro Motorsport	Aston Martin Vantage AMR GT3	Aston Martin 4.0 L Turbo V8	77	(United Kingdom) Matt Topham	PA	7
(United Kingdom) Garage 59	McLaren 720S GT3 Evo	McLaren M840T 4.0 L Turbo V8	88	(Germany) Marvin Kirchhöfer	PA	1–7
(United Kingdom) Garage 59	McLaren 720S GT3 Evo	McLaren M840T 4.0 L Turbo V8	88	(Sweden) Alexander West	PA	1–6
(United Kingdom) Garage 59	McLaren 720S GT3 Evo	McLaren M840T 4.0 L Turbo V8	88	(Portugal) Miguel Ramos	PA	7, 9
(United Kingdom) Garage 59	McLaren 720S GT3 Evo	McLaren M840T 4.0 L Turbo V8	88	(United Kingdom) Jonny Edgar	PA	9
(United Kingdom) Sky - Tempesta Racing	McLaren 720S GT3 Evo	McLaren M840T 4.0 L Turbo V8	93	(United Kingdom) Chris Froggatt	S	All
(United Kingdom) Sky - Tempesta Racing	McLaren 720S GT3 Evo	McLaren M840T 4.0 L Turbo V8	93	(Macau) Kevin Tse	S	All
(United Kingdom) Century Motorsport	BMW M4 GT3	BMW S58B30T0 3.0 L Twin Turbo I6	91	(United Kingdom) Dan Harper	PA	All
(United Kingdom) Century Motorsport	BMW M4 GT3	BMW S58B30T0 3.0 L Twin Turbo I6	91	(United Kingdom) Darren Leung	PA	All
(United Kingdom) Beechdean AMR	Aston Martin Vantage AMR GT3	Aston Martin 4.0 L Turbo V8	97	(United Kingdom) Andrew Howard	PA	All
(United Kingdom) Beechdean AMR	Aston Martin Vantage AMR GT3	Aston Martin 4.0 L Turbo V8	97	(United Kingdom) Ross Gunn	PA	1–6, 8–9
(United Kingdom) Beechdean AMR	Aston Martin Vantage AMR GT3	Aston Martin 4.0 L Turbo V8	97	(Denmark) Nicki Thiim	PA	7

Icon	Class
PA	Pro-Am Cup
S	Silver-Am Cup

=== GT4 ===
Team	Car	Engine	No.	Drivers	Class	Rounds
(United Kingdom) Paddock Motorsport	McLaren Artura GT4	McLaren M630 3.0 L Turbo V6	7	(United Kingdom) Kavi Jundu	PA	All
(United Kingdom) Paddock Motorsport	McLaren Artura GT4	McLaren M630 3.0 L Turbo V6	7	(United Kingdom) Tom Rawlings	PA	1–8
(United Kingdom) Paddock Motorsport	McLaren Artura GT4	McLaren M630 3.0 L Turbo V6	7	(United Kingdom) Tom Gamble	PA	9
(United Kingdom) One Motorsport	Mercedes-AMG GT4	Mercedes-AMG M178 4.0 L V8	12	(United Kingdom) Michael Broadhurst	PA	1–7
(United Kingdom) One Motorsport	Mercedes-AMG GT4	Mercedes-AMG M178 4.0 L V8	12	(United Kingdom) Ed McDermott	PA	1–7
(United Kingdom) Team Abba Racing	Mercedes-AMG GT4	Mercedes-AMG M178 4.0 L V8	12	(United Kingdom) Michael Broadhurst	PA	8–9
(United Kingdom) Team Abba Racing	Mercedes-AMG GT4	Mercedes-AMG M178 4.0 L V8	12	(United Kingdom) Ed McDermott	PA	8–9
(United Kingdom) Century Motorsport	BMW M4 GT4 Gen II	BMW 3.0 L Twin-Turbo I6	14	(United Kingdom) Michael Johnston	PA	All
(United Kingdom) Century Motorsport	BMW M4 GT4 Gen II	BMW 3.0 L Twin-Turbo I6	14	(United Kingdom) Chris Salkeld	PA	All
(United Kingdom) Century Motorsport	BMW M4 GT4 Gen II	BMW 3.0 L Twin-Turbo I6	22	(United Kingdom) Carl Cavers	PA	All
(United Kingdom) Century Motorsport	BMW M4 GT4 Gen II	BMW 3.0 L Twin-Turbo I6	22	(United Kingdom) Lewis Plato	PA	All
(United Kingdom) Century Motorsport	Aston Martin Vantage AMR GT4	Aston Martin 4.0 L Turbo V8	21	(United Kingdom) Bradley Ellis	PA	3
(United Kingdom) Century Motorsport	Aston Martin Vantage AMR GT4	Aston Martin 4.0 L Turbo V8	21	(United Kingdom) David Holloway	PA	3
(United Kingdom) Enduro Motorsport	McLaren Artura GT4	McLaren M630 3.0 L Turbo V6	17	(United Kingdom) Harry George	S	1–6
(United Kingdom) Enduro Motorsport	McLaren Artura GT4	McLaren M630 3.0 L Turbo V6	17	(United Kingdom) Harry Nunn	S	1–2
(United Kingdom) Enduro Motorsport	McLaren Artura GT4	McLaren M630 3.0 L Turbo V6	17	(United Kingdom) Darren Burke	S	3–6
(United Kingdom) Enduro Motorsport	Mercedes-AMG GT4	Mercedes-AMG M178 4.0 L V8	17	(United Kingdom) Darren Burke	S	7–9
(United Kingdom) Enduro Motorsport	Mercedes-AMG GT4	Mercedes-AMG M178 4.0 L V8	17	(United Kingdom) Harry George	S	7–9
(United Kingdom) Team Parker Racing	Porsche 718 Cayman GT4 RS Clubsport	Porsche 4.0 L Flat-6	18	(United Kingdom) Zac Meakin	S	1–6
(United Kingdom) Team Parker Racing	Porsche 718 Cayman GT4 RS Clubsport	Porsche 4.0 L Flat-6	18	(United Kingdom) Dan Vaughan	S	1–6
(United Kingdom) Team Parker Racing	McLaren Artura GT4	McLaren M630 3.0 L Turbo V6	18	(United Kingdom) Zac Meakin	S	7–9
(United Kingdom) Team Parker Racing	McLaren Artura GT4	McLaren M630 3.0 L Turbo V6	18	(United Kingdom) Dan Vaughan	S	7–9
(United Kingdom) R Racing	Aston Martin Vantage AMR GT4	Aston Martin 4.0 L Turbo V8	23	(United Kingdom) Josh Miller	S	All
(United Kingdom) R Racing	Aston Martin Vantage AMR GT4	Aston Martin 4.0 L Turbo V8	23	(United Kingdom) Seb Hopkins	S	All
(United Kingdom) Race Lab	McLaren Artura GT4	McLaren M630 3.0 L Turbo V6	29	(United Kingdom) Ian Gough	PA	All
(United Kingdom) Race Lab	McLaren Artura GT4	McLaren M630 3.0 L Turbo V6	29	(United Kingdom) Tom Wrigley	PA	All
(United Kingdom) MKH Racing	Aston Martin Vantage AMR GT4	Aston Martin 4.0 L Turbo V8	31	(United Kingdom) Tom Ingram	PA	9
(United Kingdom) MKH Racing	Aston Martin Vantage AMR GT4	Aston Martin 4.0 L Turbo V8	31	(United Kingdom) Ron Johnson	PA	9
(United Kingdom) DTO Motorsport	McLaren Artura GT4	McLaren M630 3.0 L Turbo V6	36	(United Kingdom) Aston Millar	S	All
(United Kingdom) DTO Motorsport	McLaren Artura GT4	McLaren M630 3.0 L Turbo V6	36	(United Kingdom) Josh Rowledge	S	All
(United Kingdom) Simpson Motorsport	BMW M4 GT4 Gen II	BMW 3.0 L Twin-Turbo I6	38	(United Kingdom) James Kaye	PA	3
(United Kingdom) Simpson Motorsport	BMW M4 GT4 Gen II	BMW 3.0 L Twin-Turbo I6	38	(Cyprus) Vasily Vladykin	PA	3
(United Kingdom) Drivetac	Mercedes-AMG GT4	Mercedes-AMG M178 4.0 L V8	50	(Republic of Ireland) Sam Maher-Loughnan	S	1–2
(United Kingdom) Drivetac	Mercedes-AMG GT4	Mercedes-AMG M178 4.0 L V8	50	(United Kingdom) James Wallis	S	1–2
(United Kingdom) Raceway Motorsport	Ginetta G56 GT4	GM LS3 6.2 L V8	55	(United Kingdom) Thomas Holland	PA	1–3, 5–6
(United Kingdom) Raceway Motorsport	Ginetta G56 GT4	GM LS3 6.2 L V8	55	(United Kingdom) Michael Crees	PA	1–3, 5–6
(United Kingdom) Raceway Motorsport	Ginetta G56 GT4	GM LS3 6.2 L V8	55	(United Kingdom) Thomas Holland	S	4, 7–9
(United Kingdom) Raceway Motorsport	Ginetta G56 GT4	GM LS3 6.2 L V8	55	(United Kingdom) Ben Short	S	4
(United Kingdom) Raceway Motorsport	Ginetta G56 GT4	GM LS3 6.2 L V8	55	(Italy) Ignacio Zanon	S	7
(United Kingdom) Raceway Motorsport	Ginetta G56 GT4	GM LS3 6.2 L V8	55	(United Kingdom) Morgan Short	S	8
(United Kingdom) Raceway Motorsport	Ginetta G56 GT4	GM LS3 6.2 L V8	55	(United Kingdom) Ben Collins	S	9
(United Kingdom) Raceway Motorsport	Ginetta G56 GT4	GM LS3 6.2 L V8	56	(United Kingdom) Stuart Middleton	S	All
(United Kingdom) Raceway Motorsport	Ginetta G56 GT4	GM LS3 6.2 L V8	56	(United Kingdom) Freddie Tomlinson	S	All
(United Kingdom) Academy Motorsport	Ford Mustang GT4	Ford 5.2 L Voodoo V8	61	(United Kingdom) Matt Cowley	S	All
(United Kingdom) Academy Motorsport	Ford Mustang GT4	Ford 5.2 L Voodoo V8	61	(United States) Erik Evans	S	All
(United Kingdom) Academy Motorsport	Ford Mustang GT4	Ford 5.2 L Voodoo V8	62	(United Kingdom) Will Moore	S	All
(United Kingdom) Academy Motorsport	Ford Mustang GT4	Ford 5.2 L Voodoo V8	62	(United Kingdom) Matt Nicoll-Jones	S	All
(United Kingdom) Team BRIT	McLaren 570S GT4	McLaren 3.8 L Turbo V8	68	(United Kingdom) Aaron Morgan	PA	1–3, 8
(United Kingdom) Team BRIT	McLaren 570S GT4	McLaren 3.8 L Turbo V8	68	(United Kingdom) Bobby Trundley	PA	1–3, 8
(United Kingdom) Toro Verde GT	Ginetta G56 GT4	GM LS3 6.2 L V8	80	(United Kingdom) Esmee Hawkey	S	1–4
(United Kingdom) Toro Verde GT	Ginetta G56 GT4	GM LS3 6.2 L V8	80	(United Kingdom) Joe Wheeler	S	1–4
(United Kingdom) Toro Verde GT	Ginetta G56 GT4	GM LS3 6.2 L V8	80	(United Kingdom) Ian Duggan	PA	5–9
(United Kingdom) Toro Verde GT	Ginetta G56 GT4	GM LS3 6.2 L V8	80	(United Kingdom) Joe Wheeler	PA	5–9
(United Kingdom) Toro Verde GT	Ginetta G56 GT4	GM LS3 6.2 L V8	86	(United Kingdom) Ian Duggan	Am	1–4
(United Kingdom) Toro Verde GT	Ginetta G56 GT4	GM LS3 6.2 L V8	86	(United Kingdom) James Townsend	Am	1–4
(United Kingdom) Toro Verde GT	Ginetta G56 GT4	GM LS3 6.2 L V8	86	(United Kingdom) Mike Simpson	PA	5–9
(United Kingdom) Toro Verde GT	Ginetta G56 GT4	GM LS3 6.2 L V8	86	(United Kingdom) James Townsend	PA	5–9
(United Kingdom) Optimum Motorsport	McLaren Artura GT4	McLaren M630 3.0 L Turbo V6	90	(United Kingdom) Jack Brown	S	All
(United Kingdom) Optimum Motorsport	McLaren Artura GT4	McLaren M630 3.0 L Turbo V6	90	(United Kingdom) Charles Clark	S	All

Icon	Class
PA	Pro-Am Cup
S	Silver Cup
Am	Am Cup

== Race results ==
Bold indicates overall winner for each car class (GT3 and GT4).

=== GT3 ===
Event	Circuit	Pole position	Pro-Am winners	Silver-Am winners
1	Oulton Park	(Bahrain) #4 2 Seas Motorsport	**(Bahrain) #4 2 Seas Motorsport**	(United Kingdom) #42 Race Lab
1	Oulton Park	(United Kingdom) Jonathan Adam (United Kingdom) James Cottingham	**(United Kingdom) Jonathan Adam** **(United Kingdom) James Cottingham**	(United Kingdom) Ian Campbell (United Kingdom) James Kell
2	Oulton Park	(Bahrain) #1 2 Seas Motorsport	**(Bahrain) #1 2 Seas Motorsport**	(United Kingdom) #42 Race Lab
2	Oulton Park	(Andorra) Jules Gounon (United Kingdom) Ian Loggie	**(Andorra) Jules Gounon** **(United Kingdom) Ian Loggie**	(United Kingdom) Ian Campbell (United Kingdom) James Kell
3	Silverstone	(United Kingdom) #8 Team Abba Racing	**(United Kingdom) #91 Century Motorsport**	(United Kingdom) #72 Barwell Motorsport
3	Silverstone	(United Kingdom) Richard Neary (United Kingdom) Sam Neary	**(United Kingdom) Daniel Harper** **(United Kingdom) Darren Leung**	(United Kingdom) Mark Sansom (United Kingdom) Will Tregurtha
4	Donington	(United Kingdom) #78 Barwell Motorsport	**(Bahrain) #4 2 Seas Motorsport**	(United Kingdom) #93 Sky - Tempesta Racing
4	Donington	(United Kingdom) Shaun Balfe (United Kingdom) Sandy Mitchell	**(United Kingdom) Jonathan Adam** **(United Kingdom) James Cottingham**	(United Kingdom) Chris Froggatt (Macau) Kevin Tse
5	Snetterton	(United Kingdom) #78 Barwell Motorsport	**(United Kingdom) #78 Barwell Motorsport**	(United Kingdom) #93 Sky - Tempesta Racing
5	Snetterton	(United Kingdom) Shaun Balfe (United Kingdom) Sandy Mitchell	**(United Kingdom) Shaun Balfe** **(United Kingdom) Sandy Mitchell**	(United Kingdom) Chris Froggatt (Macau) Kevin Tse
6	Snetterton	(United Kingdom) #97 Beechdean Motorsport	**(United Kingdom) #15 RAM Racing**	(United Kingdom) #93 Sky - Tempesta Racing
6	Snetterton	(United Kingdom) Andrew Howard (United Kingdom) Ross Gunn	**(United Kingdom) John Ferguson** **(Switzerland) Raffaele Marciello**	(United Kingdom) Chris Froggatt (Macau) Kevin Tse
7	Portimão	(United Kingdom) #88 Garage 59	**(Bahrain) #4 2 Seas Motorsport**	(United Kingdom) #72 Barwell Motorsport
7	Portimão	(Portugal) Miguel Ramos (Germany) Marvin Kirchhöfer	**(United Kingdom) James Cottingham** **(United Kingdom) Jonathan Adam**	(United Kingdom) Mark Sansom (United Kingdom) Will Tregurtha
8	Brands Hatch	(Bahrain) #4 2 Seas Motorsport	**(United Kingdom) #91 Century Motorsport**	(United Kingdom) #50 Drivetac
8	Brands Hatch	(United Kingdom) Jonathan Adam (United Kingdom) James Cottingham	**(United Kingdom) Daniel Harper** **(United Kingdom) Darren Leung**	(United Kingdom) James Wallis (United Kingdom) Chris Hart
9	Donington	(United Kingdom) #97 Beechdean Motorsport	**(United Kingdom) #78 Barwell Motorsport**	(United Kingdom) #72 Barwell Motorsport
9	Donington	(United Kingdom) Andrew Howard (United Kingdom) Ross Gunn	**(United Kingdom) Shaun Balfe** **(United Kingdom) Sandy Mitchell**	(United Kingdom) Mark Sansom (United Kingdom) Will Tregurtha

=== GT4 ===
Event	Circuit	Pole position	Silver winners	Pro-Am winners	Am winners
1	Oulton Park	(United Kingdom) #90 Optimum Motorsport	**(United Kingdom) #62 Academy Motorsport**	(United Kingdom) #55 Raceway Motorsport	(United Kingdom) #86 Toro Verde GT
1	Oulton Park	(United Kingdom) Jack Brown (United Kingdom) Charles Clark	**(United Kingdom) Will Moore** **(United Kingdom) Matt Nicoll-Jones**	(United Kingdom) Michael Crees (United Kingdom) Thomas Holland	(United Kingdom) Ian Duggan (United Kingdom) James Townsend
2	Oulton Park	(United Kingdom) #90 Optimum Motorsport	(United Kingdom) #90 Optimum Motorsport	**(United Kingdom) #29 Race Lab**	(United Kingdom) #86 Toro Verde GT
2	Oulton Park	(United Kingdom) Jack Brown (United Kingdom) Charles Clark	(United Kingdom) Jack Brown (United Kingdom) Charles Clark	**(United Kingdom) Ian Gough** **(United Kingdom) Tom Wrigley**	(United Kingdom) Ian Duggan (United Kingdom) James Townsend
3	Silverstone	(United Kingdom) #18 Team Parker Racing	**(United Kingdom) #90 Optimum Motorsport**	(United Kingdom) #12 One Motorsport	(United Kingdom) #86 Toro Verde GT
3	Silverstone	(United Kingdom) Zac Meakin (United Kingdom) Dan Vaughan	**(United Kingdom) Jack Brown** **(United Kingdom) Charles Clark**	(United Kingdom) Michael Broadhurst (United Kingdom) Ed McDermott	(United Kingdom) Ian Duggan (United Kingdom) James Townsend
4	Donington	(United Kingdom) #36 DTO Motorsport	**(United Kingdom) #90 Optimum Motorsport**	(United Kingdom) #29 Race Lab	No Finishers
4	Donington	(United Kingdom) Aston Millar (United Kingdom) Josh Rowledge	**(United Kingdom) Jack Brown** **(United Kingdom) Charles Clark**	(United Kingdom) Ian Gough (United Kingdom) Tom Wrigley	No Finishers
5	Snetterton	(United Kingdom) #56 Raceway Motorsport	**(United Kingdom) #56 Raceway Motorsport**	(United Kingdom) #55 Raceway Motorsport	No Entries
5	Snetterton	(United Kingdom) Stuart Middleton (United Kingdom) Freddie Tomlinson	**(United Kingdom) Stuart Middleton** **(United Kingdom) Freddie Tomlinson**	(United Kingdom) Michael Crees (United Kingdom) Thomas Holland	No Entries
6	Snetterton	(United Kingdom) #90 Optimum Motorsport	**(United Kingdom) #90 Optimum Motorsport**	(United Kingdom) #22 Century Motorsport	No Entries
6	Snetterton	(United Kingdom) Jack Brown (United Kingdom) Charles Clark	**(United Kingdom) Jack Brown** **(United Kingdom) Charles Clark**	(United Kingdom) Carl Cavers (United Kingdom) Lewis Plato	No Entries
7	Portimão	(United Kingdom) #23 R Racing	(United Kingdom) #17 Enduro Motorsport	**(United Kingdom) #14 Century Motorsport**	No Entries
7	Portimão	(United Kingdom) Josh Miller (United Kingdom) Seb Hopkins	(United Kingdom) Harry George (United Kingdom) Darren Burke	**(United Kingdom) Michael Johnston** **(United Kingdom) Chris Salkeld**	No Entries
8	Brands Hatch	(United Kingdom) #36 DTO Motorsport	**(United Kingdom) #61 Academy Motorsport**	(United Kingdom) #14 Century Motorsport	No Entries
8	Brands Hatch	(United Kingdom) Aston Millar (United Kingdom) Josh Rowledge	**(United States) Erik Evans** **(United Kingdom) Matt Cowley**	(United Kingdom) Michael Johnston (United Kingdom) Chris Salkeld	No Entries
9	Donington	(United Kingdom) #23 R Racing	**(United Kingdom) #61 Academy Motorsport**	(United Kingdom) #29 Race Lab	No Entries
9	Donington	(United Kingdom) Josh Miller (United Kingdom) Seb Hopkins	**(United States) Erik Evans** **(United Kingdom) Matt Cowley**	(United Kingdom) Ian Gough (United Kingdom) Tom Wrigley	No Entries

== Championship standings ==
Points were awarded as follows:

Length	1st	2nd	3rd	4th	5th	6th	7th	8th	9th	10th
1 hour	25	18	15	12	10	8	6	4	2	1
2+ hours	37.5	27	22.5	18	15	12	9	6	3	1.5

=== Drivers' championships ===
==== Overall ====
Pos.	Drivers	Team	OUL		SIL	DON	SNE		ALG	BRH	DON	Points
GT3
1	(United Kingdom) Darren Leung (United Kingdom) Dan Harper	(United Kingdom) Century Motorsport	6	6	1	5	2	5	5	1	2	176
2	(United Kingdom) James Cottingham	(Bahrain) 2 Seas Motorsport	**1**	4	11	1	6	2	1	**3**	10	163.5
3	(United Kingdom) Jonathan Adam	(Bahrain) 2 Seas Motorsport	**1**	4	11	1	6	2	1	**3**		162
4	(United Kingdom) Shaun Balfe (United Kingdom) Sandy Mitchell	(United Kingdom) Barwell Motorsport	12	7	2	**7**	**1**	9	3	5	1	144
5	(United Kingdom) Ian Loggie	(Bahrain) 2 Seas Motorsport	4	**1**	7	3	7	3	6	4	5	134.5
6	(Andorra) Jules Gounon	(Bahrain) 2 Seas Motorsport	4	**1**	7	3	7	3		4	5	122.5
7	(United Kingdom) John Ferguson (Switzerland) Raffaele Marciello	(United Kingdom) Ram Racing	5	2	5	Ret	8	1	4	Ret	4	108
8	(United Kingdom) Andrew Howard	(United Kingdom) Beechdean AMR	2	5	4	4	17	**15**	Ret	2	**6**	103
8	(United Kingdom) Ross Gunn	(United Kingdom) Beechdean AMR	2	5	4	4	17	**15**		2	**6**	103
9	(United Kingdom) Mark Radcliffe	(United Kingdom) Optimum Motorsport	7	10	3	8	3	11	2	7	7	95.5
10	(United Kingdom) Rob Bell	(United Kingdom) Optimum Motorsport	7	10	3	8	3	11	2	7		86.5
11	(United Kingdom) Marcus Clutton	(United Kingdom) Enduro Motorsport	3	Ret	14	23	10	7	11		3	46
12	(United Kingdom) Morgan Tillbrook	(United Kingdom) Enduro Motorsport	3	Ret	14	23					3	37.5
13	(Macau) Kevin Tse (United Kingdom) Chris Froggatt	(United Kingdom) Sky Tempesta Racing	13	15	12	6	4	8	9	10	12	35.5
14	(United Kingdom) Mark Sansom (United Kingdom) Will Tregurtha	(United Kingdom) Barwell Motorsport	14	16	6	9	9	16	8	8	11	32
15	(United Kingdom) Lucky Khera (United Kingdom) Euan Hankey	(United Kingdom) Race Lab	8	11	Ret	2	14	12	13			31
16	(Germany) Marvin Kirchhöfer	(United Kingdom) Garage 59 (United Kingdom) Optimum Motorsport	11	3	33	Ret	16	WD	**Ret**		7	24
17	(United Kingdom) Simon Orange (United Kingdom) Michael O'Brien	(United Kingdom) Orange Racing powered by JMH	33	9	Ret		11	4		Ret	8	20
18	(Sweden) Alexander West	(United Kingdom) Garage 59	11	3	33	Ret	16	WD				15
19	(United Kingdom) Chris Hart (United Kingdom) James Wallis	(United Kingdom) Drivetac			9	24	18	17	14	6		15
20	(United Kingdom) Martin Plowman (United States) Mark Smith	(United Kingdom) Paddock Motorsport	9	8	17	10	12	10	12	9	9	14.5
21	(United Kingdom) Callum MacLeod (United Kingdom) Mike Price	(United Kingdom) Greystone GT	17	14	8	Ret	13	6		12	Ret	14
22	(United Kingdom) Phil Keen	(Bahrain) 2 Seas Motorsport							6			12
23	(United Kingdom) Richard Neary (United Kingdom) Sam Neary	(United Kingdom) Team ABBA Racing	Ret	13	**13**	Ret	5	14		Ret	14	10
24	(United Kingdom) Matt Topham	(United Kingdom) Enduro Motorsport					10	7	11			8.5
25	(United Kingdom) Iain Campbell (United Kingdom) James Kell	(United Kingdom) Race Lab	10	12	31	12	15	13	10	11	Ret	4
26	(Switzerland) Philip Ellis	(Bahrain) 2 Seas Motorsport									10	1.5
-	(Portugal) Miguel Ramos	(United Kingdom) Garage 59							**Ret**		13	0
-	(United Kingdom) Jonny Edgar	(United Kingdom) Garage 59									13	0
-	(Estonia) Andrey Borodin (United Kingdom) Oliver Webb	(United Kingdom) Greystone GT	15	20	18	11	19	28	15			0
-	(Denmark) Nicki Thiim	(United Kingdom) Beechdean AMR							Ret			0
**Drivers ineligible to score points**
-	(United Kingdom) Ben Barnicoat (United States) Brendan Iribe	(United Kingdom) Inception Racing			10							0
-	(United Kingdom) Charles Bateman (United Kingdom) Alex Martin	(United Kingdom) Team Parker Racing			15							0
-	(Switzerland) Claude Bovet (United Kingdom) David McDonald	(United Kingdom) Blackthorn			16							0
-	(United Kingdom) Nick Jones (United Kingdom) Scott Malvern	(United Kingdom) Team Parker Racing			32							0
-	(United Kingdom) Andrew Gilbert (Spain) Fran Rueda	(United Kingdom) Greystone GT			Ret							0
-	(United Kingdom) Tim Creswick (Finland) Konsta Lappalainen	(United Kingdom) 7TSIX							7			0
-	(United Kingdom) Abbie Eaton (United Kingdom) John Seale	(United Kingdom) Fox Motorsport									Ret	0
GT4
1	(United States) Erik Evans (United Kingdom) Matt Cowley	(United Kingdom) Academy Motorsport	18	24	21	18	DSQ	DSQ	21	13	15	145.5
2	(United Kingdom) Jack Brown (United Kingdom) Charles Clark	(United Kingdom) Optimum Motorsport	**23**	**18**	19	14	25	18	24	Ret	25	124.5
3	(United Kingdom) Ian Gough (United Kingdom) Tom Wrigley	(United Kingdom) Race Lab	32	17	35	13	28	23	19	23	16	117.5
4	(United Kingdom) Michael Johnston (United Kingdom) Chris Salkeld	(United Kingdom) Century Motorsport	21	27	26	17	22	25	16	15	23	117
5	(United Kingdom) Josh Rowledge (United Kingdom) Aston Millar	(United Kingdom) DTO Motorsport	25	19	23	Ret	24	19	18	**21**	17	111
6	(United Kingdom) Carl Cavers (United Kingdom) Lewis Plato	(United Kingdom) Century Motorsport	20	32	24	15	23	21	Ret	17	18	106.5
7	(United Kingdom) Josh Miller (United Kingdom) Seb Hopkins	(United Kingdom) R Racing	Ret	21	28	22	21	20	25	14	**22**	84
8	(United Kingdom) Harry George	(United Kingdom) Enduro Motorsport	Ret	WD	29	16	32	26	17	19	20	69.5
8	(United Kingdom) Darren Burke	(United Kingdom) Enduro Motorsport			29	16	32	26	17	19	20	69.5
9	(United Kingdom) Will Moore (United Kingdom) Matt Nicoll-Jones	(United Kingdom) Academy Motorsport	16	29	34	Ret	26	27	29	16	19	65
10	(United Kingdom) Freddie Tomlinson (United Kingdom) Stuart Middleton	(United Kingdom) Raceway Motorsport	29	25	DSQ	21	20	Ret	22	20	26	47
11	(United Kingdom) Michael Broadhurst (United Kingdom) Ed McDermott	(United Kingdom) One Motorsport Rounds 1-7 (United Kingdom) Team ABBA Racing Round 8-9	26	26	20	20	29	24	26	Ret	24	44.5
12	(United Kingdom) Kavi Jundu	(United Kingdom) Paddock Motorsport	22	28	27	19	31	Ret	Ret	22	21	33.5
13	(United Kingdom) James Townsend	(United Kingdom) Toro Verde GT	30	31	36	Ret	27	Ret	20	18	Ret	31
13	(United Kingdom) Mike Simpson	(United Kingdom) Toro Verde GT					27	Ret	20	18	Ret	31
14	(United Kingdom) Zac Meakin (United Kingdom) Dan Vaughan	(United Kingdom) Team Parker Racing	24	23	25	DNS	Ret	Ret	23	Ret	28	30
15	(United Kingdom) Tom Rawlings	(United Kingdom) Paddock Motorsport	22	28	27	19	31	Ret	Ret	22		24.5
16	(United Kingdom) Thomas Holland	(United Kingdom) Raceway Motorsport	19	34	30	Ret	DSQ	DSQ	28	24	Ret	15
16	(United Kingdom) Michael Crees	(United Kingdom) Raceway Motorsport	19	34	30		DSQ	DSQ				15
17	(United Kingdom) Joe Wheeler	(United Kingdom) Toro Verde GT	31	30	Ret	Ret	30	22	27	Ret	Ret	10
17	(United Kingdom) Ian Duggan	(United Kingdom) Toro Verde GT	30	31	36	Ret	30	22	30	Ret	Ret	10
18	(Republic of Ireland) Sam Maher-Loughnan (United Kingdom) James Wallis	(United Kingdom) Drivetac powered by Track Focused	27	22								10
19	(United Kingdom) Tom Gamble	(United Kingdom) Paddock Motorsport									21	9
-	(United Kingdom) Aaron Morgan (United Kingdom) Bobby Trundley	(United Kingdom) Team BRIT	28	33	DSQ					25		0
-	(United Kingdom) Morgan Short	(United Kingdom) Raceway Motorsport								24		0
-	(Italy) Ignazio Zanton	(United Kingdom) Toro Verde GT							28			0
-	(United Kingdom) Esmee Hawkey	(United Kingdom) Toro Verde GT	31	30	Ret	Ret						0
-	(United Kingdom) Harry Nunn	(United Kingdom) Enduro Motorsport	Ret	WD								0
-	(United Kingdom) Ben Short	(United Kingdom) Raceway Motorsport				Ret						0
-	(United Kingdom) Ben Collins	(United Kingdom) Raceway Motorsport									Ret	0
Drivers ineligible to score points
-	(United Kingdom) Bradley Ellis (United Kingdom) David Holloway	(United Kingdom) Century Motorsport			22							0
-	(United Kingdom) Ron Johnson (United Kingdom) Tom Ingram	(United Kingdom) MKH Racing									27	0
-	(United Kingdom) James Kaye (Cyprus) Vasily Vladykin	(United Kingdom) Simpson Motorsport			Ret							0
Pos.	Drivers	Team	OUL		SIL	DON	SNE		ALG	BRH	DON	Points

Colour	Result
Gold	Winner
Silver	Second place
Bronze	Third place
Green	Points classification
Blue	Non-points classification
Blue	Non-classified finish (NC)
Purple	Retired, not classified (Ret)
Red	Did not qualify (DNQ)
Red	Did not pre-qualify (DNPQ)
Black	Disqualified (DSQ)
White	Did not start (DNS)
White	Withdrew (WD)
White	Race cancelled (C)
Blank	Did not practice (DNP)
Blank	Did not arrive (DNA)
Blank	Excluded (EX)

**Bold** indicates pole position

==== Pro-Am Cup ====
Pos.	Drivers	Team	OUL		SIL	DON	SNE		ALG	BRH	DON	Points
GT3
1	(United Kingdom) Darren Leung (United Kingdom) Dan Harper	(United Kingdom) Century Motorsport	6	6	1	5	2	5	5	1	2	176
2	(United Kingdom) James Cottingham	(Bahrain) 2 Seas Motorsport	**1**	4	11	1	6	2	1	**3**	10	172
3	(United Kingdom) Jonathan Adam	(Bahrain) 2 Seas Motorsport	**1**	4	11	1	6	2	1	**3**		170.5
4	(United Kingdom) Shaun Balfe (United Kingdom) Sandy Mitchell	(United Kingdom) Barwell Motorsport	12	7	2	7	1	9	3	5	1	149
5	(United Kingdom) Ian Loggie	(Bahrain) 2 Seas Motorsport	4	**1**	7	3	7	3	6	4	5	141.5
6	(Andorra) Jules Gounon	(Bahrain) 2 Seas Motorsport	4	**1**	7	3	7	3		4	5	129.5
7	(United Kingdom) John Ferguson (Switzerland) Raffaele Marciello	(United Kingdom) Ram Racing	5	2	5	Ret	8	1	4	Ret	4	112
8	(United Kingdom) Andrew Howard	(United Kingdom) Beachdean AMR	2	5	4	4	17	15	Ret	2	6	103
8	(United Kingdom) Ross Gunn	(United Kingdom) Beachdean AMR	2	5	4	4	17	15		2	6	103
9	(United Kingdom) Mark Radcliffe	(United Kingdom) Optimum Motorsport	7	10	3	8	3	11	2	7	7	102.5
10	(United Kingdom) Rob Bell	(United Kingdom) Optimum Motorsport	7	10	3	8	3	11	2	7		93.5
11	(United Kingdom) Marcus Clutton	(United Kingdom) Enduro Motorsport	3	Ret	14	23	10	7	11		3	63
12	(United Kingdom) Morgan Tillbrook	(United Kingdom) Enduro Motorsport	3	Ret	14	23					3	42
13	(United Kingdom) Martin Plowman (United States) Mark Smith	(United Kingdom) Paddock Motorsport	9	8	17	10	12	10	12	9	9	35.5
14	(United Kingdom) Lucky Khera (United Kingdom) Euan Hankey	(United Kingdom) Race Lab	8	11	Ret	2	14	12	13			34
15	(Germany) Marvin Kirchhöfer	(United Kingdom) Garage 59 (United Kingdom) Optimum Motorsport	11	3	33	Ret	16				7	25
16	(United Kingdom) Simon Orange (United Kingdom) Michael O'Brien	(United Kingdom) Orange Racing powered by JMH	33	9	Ret		11	4		Ret	8	24
17	(United Kingdom) Callum MacLeod (United Kingdom) Mike Price	(United Kingdom) Greystone GT	17	14	8	Ret	13	6		12	Ret	24
18	(United Kingdom) Matt Topham	(United Kingdom) Enduro Motorsport					10	7	11			21
19	(Sweden) Alexander West	(United Kingdom) Garage 59	11	3	33	Ret	16					16
20	(United Kingdom) Phil Keen	(Bahrain) 2 Seas Motorsport							6			12
21	(Estonia) Andrey Borodin (United Kingdom) Oliver Webb	(United Kingdom) Greystone GT	15	20	18	11	19	28				4.5
22	(Switzerland) Philip Ellis	(Bahrain) 2 Seas Motorsport									10	1.5
-	(Denmark) Nicki Thiim	(United Kingdom) Beechdean AMR							Ret			0
-	(Portugal) Miguel Ramos (United Kingdom) Jonny Edgar	(United Kingdom) Garage 59							**Ret**		13	0
GT4
1	(United Kingdom) Michael Johnston (United Kingdom) Chris Salkeld	(United Kingdom) Century Motorsport	21	27	26	17	22	25	16	15	23	203
2	(United Kingdom) Ian Gough (United Kingdom) Tom Wrigley	(United Kingdom) Race Lab	**32**	**17**	35	13	28	23	19	23	16	187
3	(United Kingdom) Carl Cavers (United Kingdom) Lewis Plato	(United Kingdom) Century Motorsport	20	32	24	15	23	21	Ret	17	18	179
4	(United Kingdom) Michael Broadhurst (United Kingdom) Ed McDermott	(United Kingdom) One Motorsport	26	26	20	20	29	24	26	Ret	24	135.5
5	(United Kingdom) Kavi Jundu	(United Kingdom) Paddock Motorsport	22	28	27	19	31	Ret	Ret	22	21	106.5
6	(United Kingdom) Tom Rawlings	(United Kingdom) Paddock Motorsport	22	28	27	19	31	Ret	Ret	22		84
7	(United Kingdom) James Townsend (United Kingdom) Mike Simpson	(United Kingdom) Toro Verde GT					27	Ret	20	18	Ret	60
8	(United Kingdom) Michael Crees (United Kingdom) Thomas Holland	(United Kingdom) Raceway Motorsport	19	34	30		DSQ	DSQ				46
9	(United Kingdom) Ian Duggan (United Kingdom) Joe Wheeler	(United Kingdom) Toro Verde GT					30	22	27	Ret	Ret	41
10	(United Kingdom) Aaron Morgan (United Kingdom) Bobby Trundley	(United Kingdom) Team BRIT	28	33	DSQ					25		28
11	(United Kingdom) Tom Gamble	(United Kingdom) Paddock Motorsport									21	22.5
Drivers ineligible to score points
-	(United Kingdom) Ron Johnson (United Kingdom) Tom Ingram	(United Kingdom) MKH Racing									27	0
Pos.	Drivers	Team	OUL		SIL	DON	SNE		ALG	BRH	DON	Points

==== Silver Cups ====
Pos.	Drivers	Team	OUL		SIL	DON	SNE		ALG	BRH	DON	Points
GT3 - (Silver/Am Cup)
1	(United Kingdom) Mark Sansom (United Kingdom) Will Tregurtha	(United Kingdom) Barwell Motorsport	14	16	6	9	9	16	8	8	11	220.5
2	(Macau) Kevin Tse (United Kingdom) Chris Froggatt	(United Kingdom) Sky - Tempesta Racing	**13**	15	12	6	4	8	9	10	12	219.5
3	(United Kingdom) Iain Campbell (United Kingdom) James Kell	(United Kingdom) Race Lab	10	12	31	12	15	13	10	11	Ret	158
4	(United Kingdom) Chris Hart (United Kingdom) James Wallis	(United Kingdom) Drivetac			9	24	18	17	14	6		120.5
5	(United Kingdom) Richard Neary (United Kingdom) Sam Neary	(United Kingdom) Team ABBA Racing	Ret	**13**	13	Ret	5	14		Ret	14	91.5
Drivers ineligible to score points
-	(United Kingdom) Abbie Eaton (United Kingdom) John Seale	(United Kingdom) Fox Motorsport									Ret	0
GT4 - (Silver Cup)
1	(United Kingdom) Jack Brown (United Kingdom) Charles Clark	(United Kingdom) Optimum Motorsport	**23**	**18**	19	14	25	18	24	Ret	25	176
2	(United States) Erik Evans (United Kingdom) Matt Cowley	(United Kingdom) Academy Motorsport	18	24	21	18	DSQ	DSQ	21	13	15	173
3	(United Kingdom) Josh Rowledge (United Kingdom) Aston Millar	(United Kingdom) DTO Motorsport	25	19	23	Ret	24	19	18	21	17	149.5
4	(United Kingdom) Harry George	(United Kingdom) Enduro Motorsport	Ret	WD	29	16	32	26	17	19	20	132.5
4	(United Kingdom) Darren Burke	(United Kingdom) Enduro Motorsport			29	16	32	26	17	19	20	132.5
5	(United Kingdom) Josh Miller (United Kingdom) Seb Hopkins	(United Kingdom) R Racing	Ret	21	28	22	21	20	25	14	22	129
6	(United Kingdom) Will Moore (United Kingdom) Matt Nicoll-Jones	(United Kingdom) Academy Motorsport	16	29	34	Ret	26	27	29	16	19	106
7	(United Kingdom) Freddie Tomlinson (United Kingdom) Stuart Middleton	(United Kingdom) Raceway Motorsport	29	25	DSQ	21	20	Ret	22	20	26	97
8	(United Kingdom) Zac Meakin (United Kingdom) Dan Vaughan	(United Kingdom) Team Parker Racing	24	23	25	DNS	Ret	Ret	23	Ret	28	61
9	(Republic of Ireland) Sam Maher-Loughnan (United Kingdom) James Wallis	(United Kingdom) Drivetac powered by Track Focused	27	22								20
10	(United Kingdom) Thomas Holland	(United Kingdom) Raceway Motorsport							28	24	Ret	15
11	(United Kingdom) Morgan Short	(United Kingdom) Raceway Motorsport								24		9
12	(Italy) Ignazio Zanon	(United Kingdom) Raceway Motorsport							28			6
13	(United Kingdom) Joe Wheeler (United Kingdom) Esmee Hawkey	(United Kingdom) Toro Verde GT	31	30	Ret	Ret						6
14	(United Kingdom) Harry Nunn	(United Kingdom) Enduro Motorsport										0
15	(United Kingdom) Ben Short	(United Kingdom) Raceway Motorsport				Ret						0
16	(United Kingdom) Ben Collins	(United Kingdom) Raceway Motorsport									Ret	0
Pos.	Drivers	Team	OUL		SIL	DON	SNE		ALG	BRH	DON	Points

==== AM Cup ====
Pos.	Drivers	Team	OUL		SIL	DON	SNE	ALG	BRH	DON	Points
GT4 - (Am Cup)
1	(United Kingdom) Ian Duggan (United Kingdom) James Townsend	(United Kingdom) Toro Verde GT	**30**	**31**	36	Ret					87.5
Pos.	Drivers	Team	OUL		SIL	DON	SNE	ALG	BRH	DON	Points

=== Teams' championship ===
Pos.	Team	Manufacturer	No.	OUL		SIL	DON	SNE		ALG	BRH	DON	Points
GT3
1	(Bahrain) 2 Seas Motorsport	Mercedes-AMG	1	4	1	7	3	7	3	6	4	5	298
1	(Bahrain) 2 Seas Motorsport	Mercedes-AMG	4	1	4	11	1	6	2	1	3	10	298
2	(United Kingdom) Century Motorsport	BMW	91	6	6	1	5	2	5	5	1	2	176
3	(United Kingdom) Barwell Motorsport	Lamborghini	72	14	16	6	9	9	16	8	8	11	176
3	(United Kingdom) Barwell Motorsport	Lamborghini	78	12	7	2	7	1	9	3	5	1	176
4	(United Kingdom) Ram Racing	Mercedes-AMG	15	5	2	5	Ret	8	1	4	Ret	4	108
5	(United Kingdom) Beechdean AMR	Aston Martin	97	2	5	4	4	17	15	Ret	2	6	103
6	(United Kingdom) Optimum Motorsport	McLaren	27	7	10	3	8	3	11	2	7	7	95.5
7	(United Kingdom) Enduro Motorsport	McLaren	77	3	Ret	14	23	10	7	11		3	46
8	(United Kingdom) Sky - Tempesta Racing	McLaren	93	13	15	11	6	4	8	9	10	12	35.5
9	(United Kingdom) Race Lab	McLaren	13	8	11	Ret	2	14	12	13			35
9	(United Kingdom) Race Lab	McLaren	42	10	12	31	12	15	13	10	11	Ret	35
10	(United Kingdom) Orange Racing powered by JMH	McLaren	67	33	9	Ret		11	4		Ret	8	20
11	(United Kingdom) Garage 59	McLaren	88	11	3	33	Ret	16	WD	Ret		13	15
12	(United Kingdom) Drivetac	Mercedes-AMG	50			9	24	18	17	14	6		15
13	(United Kingdom) Paddock Motorsport	McLaren	11	9	8	17	10	12	10	12	9	9	14.5
14	(United Kingdom) Greystone GT	Mercedes-AMG	3	17	14	8	Ret	13	6		12	Ret	14
14	(United Kingdom) Greystone GT	McLaren	24	15	20	18	11	19	28	15			14
15	(United Kingdom) Team ABBA Racing	Mercedes-AMG	8	Ret	13	12	Ret	5	14		Ret	14	10
GT4
1	(United Kingdom) Century Motorsport	BMW	14	21	27	26	17	22	25	16	15	23	223.5
1	(United Kingdom) Century Motorsport	BMW	22	20	32	24	15	23	21	Ret	17	18	223.5
2	(United Kingdom) Academy Motorsport	Ford	61	18	24	21	18	DSQ	DSQ	21	13	15	210.5
2	(United Kingdom) Academy Motorsport	Ford	62	16	29	34	Ret	26	27	29	16	19	210.5
3	(United Kingdom) Optimum Motorsport	McLaren	90	23	18	19	14	25	18	24	Ret	25	124.5
4	(United Kingdom) Race Lab	McLaren	29	32	17	35	13	28	23	19	23	16	117.5
5	(United Kingdom) DTO Motorsport	McLaren	36	25	19	23	Ret	24	19	18	21	17	111
6	(United Kingdom) R Racing	Aston Martin	23	Ret	21	28	22	21	20	25	14	22	84
7	(United Kingdom) Enduro Motorsport	McLaren	17	Ret	WD	29	16	32	26	17	19	20	69.5
8	(United Kingdom) Raceway Motorsport	Ginetta	55	19	34	30	Ret	DSQ	DSQ	28	24	Ret	62
8	(United Kingdom) Raceway Motorsport	Ginetta	56	29	25	DSQ	21	20	Ret	22	20	26	62
9	(United Kingdom) One Motorsport	Mercedes-AMG	12	26	26	20	20	29	24	26			43
10	(United Kingdom) Toro Verde GT	Ginetta	80	31	30	Ret	Ret	30	22	27	Ret	Ret	41
10	(United Kingdom) Toro Verde GT	Ginetta	86	30	31	36	Ret	27	Ret	20	18	Ret	41
11	(United Kingdom) Paddock Motorsport	McLaren	7	22	28	27	19	31	Ret	Ret	22		33.5
12	(United Kingdom) Team Parker Racing	Porsche	18	24	23	25	DNS	Ret	Ret	23	Ret	28	30
13	(United Kingdom) Drivetac powered by Track Focused	Mercedes-AMG	50	27	22								10
14	(United Kingdom) Team ABBA Racing	Mercedes-AMG	12								Ret	24	1.5
15	(United Kingdom) Team BRIT	McLaren	68	28	33	DSQ							0
Pos.	Team	Manufacturer	No.	OUL		SIL	DON	SNE		ALG	BRH	DON	Points

== See also ==
- 2023 GT World Challenge Europe
- 2023 GT World Challenge Europe Sprint Cup
- 2023 GT World Challenge Europe Endurance Cup
- 2023 GT World Challenge Asia
- 2023 GT World Challenge America
- 2023 GT World Challenge Australia
- 2023 Intercontinental GT Challenge
