= 2023 GT Cup Championship =

The 2023 GT Cup Championship is the 17th GT Cup Championship, a British sports car championship. The season began on 1 April at Donington Park and ended on 8 October at Snetterton Circuit, after twenty-six races held over seven meetings.

== Calendar ==
The calendar was announced on 28 September 2022.

Round		Circuit	Length	Date	Support Events
1	1	Donington Park National, Leicestershire	25 min	1–2 April	Radical Cup UK; Porsche Club GB
1	2	Donington Park National, Leicestershire	50 min	1–2 April	Radical Cup UK; Porsche Club GB
1	3	Donington Park National, Leicestershire	25 min	1–2 April	Radical Cup UK; Porsche Club GB
1	4	Donington Park National, Leicestershire	50 min	1–2 April	Radical Cup UK; Porsche Club GB
2	5	Brands Hatch GP, Kent	25 min	29–30 April	Radical Cup UK; Porsche Club GB
2	6	Brands Hatch GP, Kent	50 min	29–30 April	Radical Cup UK; Porsche Club GB
2	7	Brands Hatch GP, Kent	25 min	29–30 April	Radical Cup UK; Porsche Club GB
2	8	Brands Hatch GP, Kent	50 min	29–30 April	Radical Cup UK; Porsche Club GB
3	9	Snetterton Circuit, Norfolk	25 min	2–3 June	Bell Sport Challenge Series
3	10	Snetterton Circuit, Norfolk	50 min	2–3 June	Bell Sport Challenge Series
3	11	Snetterton Circuit, Norfolk	25 min	2–3 June	Bell Sport Challenge Series
3	12	Snetterton Circuit, Norfolk	50 min	2–3 June	Bell Sport Challenge Series
4	13	Oulton Park, Cheshire	40 min	1 July	Porsche Club GB
4	14	Oulton Park, Cheshire	40 min	1 July	Porsche Club GB
5	15	Silverstone GP, Northamptonshire	25 min	29–30 July	GB3 Championship; GB4 Championship; Radical Cup UK; Porsche Club GB
5	16	Silverstone GP, Northamptonshire	50 min	29–30 July	GB3 Championship; GB4 Championship; Radical Cup UK; Porsche Club GB
5	17	Silverstone GP, Northamptonshire	25 min	29–30 July	GB3 Championship; GB4 Championship; Radical Cup UK; Porsche Club GB
5	18	Silverstone GP, Northamptonshire	50 min	29–30 July	GB3 Championship; GB4 Championship; Radical Cup UK; Porsche Club GB
6	19	Donington Park GP, Leicestershire	25 min	16–17 September	Radical Cup UK
6	20	Donington Park GP, Leicestershire	50 min	16–17 September	Radical Cup UK
6	21	Donington Park GP, Leicestershire	25 min	16–17 September	Radical Cup UK
6	22	Donington Park GP, Leicestershire	50 min	16–17 September	Radical Cup UK
7	23	Snetterton Circuit, Norfolk	25 min	7–8 October	Bell Sport Challenge Series; Porsche Club GB
7	24	Snetterton Circuit, Norfolk	50 min	7–8 October	Bell Sport Challenge Series; Porsche Club GB
7	25	Snetterton Circuit, Norfolk	25 min	7–8 October	Bell Sport Challenge Series; Porsche Club GB
7	26	Snetterton Circuit, Norfolk	50 min	7–8 October	Bell Sport Challenge Series; Porsche Club GB

== Teams and drivers ==
Classes:

Class	Notes
Group GTO	Open specification (GT2, GTE, modified) cars
Group GT3	Homologated GT3 cars
Group GTA	Lower spec, challenge cars
Group GTB	Early year challenge and cup cars
Group GTC	Later year challenge and cup cars
Group GTH	Homologated GT4 cars

Team	Car	Engine	No.	Drivers	Rounds
Group GTO
(United Kingdom) Tecserv UK by Triple M Motorsport	Mercedes-AMG GT3 Evo	Mercedes-AMG M159 6.2 L V8	4	(United Kingdom) Grahame Tilley	1–8, 19–22
(United Kingdom) Tecserv UK by Triple M Motorsport	Mercedes-AMG GT3 Evo	Mercedes-AMG M159 6.2 L V8	4	(United Kingdom) Sennan Fielding	1–8, 19–22
(United Kingdom) CTR Developments	Porsche 935	Porsche 3.0 L KKK Flat-6	5	(United Kingdom) Richard Chamberlain	1–8, 15–22
(United Kingdom) CTR Developments	Porsche 935	Porsche 3.0 L KKK Flat-6	5	(United Kingdom) Nigel Greensall	19–22
(United Kingdom) National Motorsport Academy	Mosler MT900	Chevrolet LS7 7.0 L V8	7	(United Kingdom) Marcus Short	1–8
(United Kingdom) National Motorsport Academy	Mosler MT900	Chevrolet LS7 7.0 L V8	7	(United Kingdom) Morgan Short	1–8
(United Kingdom) National Motorsport Academy	Lotus Evora GTE	Toyota 4.0 L V6	7	(United Kingdom) Jay Shepherd	15–26
(United Kingdom) Kendall Developments	Brabham BT62 Competition 6 Mercedes-AMG GT3 2 Lamborghini Huracán GT3 Evo 18	Ford Modular 5.4 L V8 6 Mercedes-AMG M159 6.2 L V8 2 Lamborghini 5.2 L V10 18	28	(United Kingdom) Paul Bailey	All
(United Kingdom) Kendall Developments	Brabham BT62 Competition 6 Mercedes-AMG GT3 2 Lamborghini Huracán GT3 Evo 18	Ford Modular 5.4 L V8 6 Mercedes-AMG M159 6.2 L V8 2 Lamborghini 5.2 L V10 18	28	(United Kingdom) Ross Wylie	1–8, 13–22
(United Kingdom) Kendall Developments	Brabham BT62 Competition 6 Mercedes-AMG GT3 2 Lamborghini Huracán GT3 Evo 18	Ford Modular 5.4 L V8 6 Mercedes-AMG M159 6.2 L V8 2 Lamborghini 5.2 L V10 18	28	(United Kingdom) James Dorlin	9–12, 23–26
(United Kingdom) Kendall Developments	Mosler MT900	Chevrolet LS7 7.0 L V8	88	(United Kingdom) Marcus Short	23–26
(United Kingdom) Kendall Developments	Mosler MT900	Chevrolet LS7 7.0 L V8	88	(United Kingdom) Morgan Short	23–26
(United Kingdom) 24/7 Motorsport	Audi R8 LMS GT4 Evo	Audi 5.2 L V10	72	(Republic of Ireland) Chris Murphy	1–4
(United Kingdom) Woodrow Motorsport	BMW M3 GTR	BMW 4.0 L V8	72	(Republic of Ireland) Chris Murphy	5–24
(United Kingdom) Woodrow Motorsport	Aston Martin Vantage GT4 (Note: Woodrow Motorsport's Group GTO BMW M3 GTR was withdrawn after Sunday Group 1 qualifying and replaced by an Aston Martin Vantage GT4 in the same class.)	Aston Martin 4.7 L V8	72	(Republic of Ireland) Chris Murphy	25–26
(United Kingdom) 7TSIX	McLaren 720S GT3	McLaren M840T 4.0 L Turbo V8	76	(United Kingdom) Logan Hannah	9–10
(United Kingdom) 7TSIX	McLaren 720S GT3	McLaren M840T 4.0 L Turbo V8	76	(United Kingdom) Ian Loggie	9–10
(United Kingdom) 7TSIX	Audi R8 LMS GT4 Evo	Audi 5.2 L V10	76	(United Kingdom) Kevin Clarke	11–12
Group GT3
(United Kingdom) Ram Racing	Mercedes-AMG GT3 Evo	Mercedes-AMG M159 6.2 L V8	8	(United Kingdom) Adam Knight	15–18
(United Kingdom) Ram Racing	Mercedes-AMG GT3 Evo	Mercedes-AMG M159 6.2 L V8	8	(United Kingdom) Euan McKay	15–18
(United Kingdom) Century Motorsport	BMW M4 GT3	BMW S58B30T0 3.0 L Twin Turbo I6	9	(United Kingdom) Darren Leung	9–12, 19–22
(United Kingdom) Century Motorsport	BMW M4 GT3	BMW S58B30T0 3.0 L Twin Turbo I6	9	(Finland) Jesse Krohn	9–12
(United Kingdom) Century Motorsport	BMW M4 GT3	BMW S58B30T0 3.0 L Twin Turbo I6	9	(United Kingdom) Dan Harper	19–22
(United Kingdom) Racelab	McLaren 720S GT3 Evo	McLaren M840T 4.0 L Turbo V8	13	(United Kingdom) Euan Hankey	1–8
(United Kingdom) Racelab	McLaren 720S GT3 Evo	McLaren M840T 4.0 L Turbo V8	13	(United Kingdom) Lucky Khera	1–8
(United Kingdom) Racelab	McLaren 720S GT3 Evo	McLaren M840T 4.0 L Turbo V8	23	(United Kingdom) Iain Campbell	19–22
(United Kingdom) Racelab	McLaren 720S GT3 Evo	McLaren M840T 4.0 L Turbo V8	23	(United Kingdom) Duncan Tappy	19–22
(United Kingdom) Greystone GT	Lamborghini Huracán GT3 Evo	Lamborghini 5.2 L V10	22	(United Kingdom) Rich Mason	13–14
(United Kingdom) Greystone GT	Lamborghini Huracán GT3 Evo	Lamborghini 5.2 L V10	22	(United Kingdom) Duncan Tappy	13–14
(United Kingdom) Greystone GT	McLaren 720S GT3 Evo	McLaren M840T 4.0 L Turbo V8	24	(Estonia) Andrey Borodin	5–8, 13–18
(United Kingdom) Greystone GT	McLaren 720S GT3 Evo	McLaren M840T 4.0 L Turbo V8	24	(United Kingdom) Ed Pead	5–8, 13–18
(United Kingdom) Optimum Motorsport	McLaren 720S GT3 Evo	McLaren M840T 4.0 L Turbo V8	27	(United Kingdom) Rob Bell	9–12
(United Kingdom) Optimum Motorsport	McLaren 720S GT3 Evo	McLaren M840T 4.0 L Turbo V8	27	(United Kingdom) Mark Radcliffe	9–12
(United Kingdom) J&S Racing	Audi R8 LMS Evo II	Audi 5.2 L V10	32	(United Kingdom) Hugo Cook	All
(United Kingdom) J&S Racing	Audi R8 LMS Evo II	Audi 5.2 L V10	32	(United Kingdom) Sacha Kakad	All
(United Kingdom) G-Cat Racing	Porsche 911 GT3 R (991.2)	Porsche 4.0 L Flat-6	33	(United Kingdom) Greg Caton	5–12, 15–22
(United Kingdom) G-Cat Racing	Porsche 911 GT3 R (991.2)	Porsche 4.0 L Flat-6	33	(United Kingdom) Shamus Jennings	5–12, 15–22
(United Kingdom) DriveTac powered by Track Focused	Mercedes-AMG GT3 Evo	Mercedes-AMG M159 6.2 L V8	50	(United Kingdom) Sam Maher-Loughnan	1–12
(United Kingdom) DriveTac powered by Track Focused	Mercedes-AMG GT3 Evo	Mercedes-AMG M159 6.2 L V8	50	(United Kingdom) James Wallis	1–12
(United Kingdom) Orange Racing powered by JMH	McLaren 720S GT3	McLaren M840T 4.0 L Turbo V8	67	(United Kingdom) Simon Orange	All
(United Kingdom) Orange Racing powered by JMH	McLaren 720S GT3	McLaren M840T 4.0 L Turbo V8	67	(United Kingdom) Tom Roche	All
(United Kingdom) Orange Racing powered by JMH	Lamborghini Huracán GT3 Evo (Note: Orange Racing powered by JMH's No. 999 Group GTC car was withdrawn after Saturday Group 1 qualifying and replaced by a Group GT3 car.)	Lamborghini 5.2 L V10	999	(United Kingdom) Marcus Clutton	23–26
(United Kingdom) Orange Racing powered by JMH	Lamborghini Huracán GT3 Evo	Lamborghini 5.2 L V10	999	(United Kingdom) Patrick Collins	23–26
(United Kingdom) 7TSIX	McLaren 720S GT3	McLaren M840T 4.0 L Turbo V8	76	(United Kingdom) Ian Loggie	1–4, 23–26
(United Kingdom) 7TSIX	McLaren 720S GT3	McLaren M840T 4.0 L Turbo V8	76	(United Kingdom) Casper Stevenson	1–4
(United Kingdom) 7TSIX	McLaren 720S GT3	McLaren M840T 4.0 L Turbo V8	76	(United Kingdom) Paul Rogers	15–18
(United Kingdom) 7TSIX	McLaren 720S GT3	McLaren M840T 4.0 L Turbo V8	76	(United Kingdom) James Wallis	15–18
(United Kingdom) 7TSIX	McLaren 720S GT3	McLaren M840T 4.0 L Turbo V8	76	(United Kingdom) Tom Emson	23–26
(United Kingdom) Enduro Motorsport	McLaren 720S GT3	McLaren M840T 4.0 L Turbo V8	77	(United Kingdom) Marcus Clutton	1–12
(United Kingdom) Enduro Motorsport	McLaren 720S GT3	McLaren M840T 4.0 L Turbo V8	77	(United Kingdom) Morgan Tillbrook	1–8
(United Kingdom) Enduro Motorsport	McLaren 720S GT3	McLaren M840T 4.0 L Turbo V8	77	(United Kingdom) Matt Topham	9–12
Group GTC
(United Kingdom) Topcats Racing	Lamborghini Huracán Super Trofeo Evo	Lamborghini 5.2 L V10	2	(United Kingdom) Charlotte Gilbert	All
(United Kingdom) Topcats Racing	Lamborghini Huracán Super Trofeo Evo	Lamborghini 5.2 L V10	2	(United Kingdom) Warren Gilbert	1–8
(United Kingdom) Topcats Racing	Lamborghini Huracán Super Trofeo Evo	Lamborghini 5.2 L V10	2	(United Kingdom) Gilbert Yates	9–12, 15–22
(United Kingdom) Topcats Racing	Lamborghini Huracán Super Trofeo Evo	Lamborghini 5.2 L V10	2	(United Kingdom) Morgan Short	13–14
(United Kingdom) Topcats Racing	Lamborghini Huracán Super Trofeo Evo	Lamborghini 5.2 L V10	2	(United Kingdom) Sam Neary	23–26
(United Kingdom) Blackthorn	Lamborghini Huracán Super Trofeo Evo 2	Lamborghini 5.2 L V10	11	(United Kingdom) Gilbert Yates	1–8
(United Kingdom) Blackthorn	Lamborghini Huracán Super Trofeo Evo 2	Lamborghini 5.2 L V10	11	(United Kingdom) David McDonald	1–4
(Italy) AF Corse	Ferrari 488 Challenge Evo	Ferrari 3.9 L Twin-Turbo V8	19	(United Kingdom) Dan de Zille	1–4, 13–18, 23–26
(Italy) AF Corse	Ferrari 488 Challenge Evo	Ferrari 3.9 L Twin-Turbo V8	19	(United Kingdom) Graham de Zille	1–4, 13–18, 23–26
(United Kingdom) FF Corse	Ferrari 488 Challenge Evo	Ferrari 3.9 L Twin-Turbo V8	26	(United Kingdom) Tom Fleming	15–18
(United Kingdom) FF Corse	Ferrari 488 Challenge Evo	Ferrari 3.9 L Twin-Turbo V8	26	(United Kingdom) James Owen	15–18
(United Kingdom) Woodrow Motorsport	Lamborghini Huracán Super Trofeo	Lamborghini 5.2 L V10	62	(United Kingdom) Kevin Clarke	1–12
(United Kingdom) Woodrow Motorsport	Lamborghini Huracán Super Trofeo	Lamborghini 5.2 L V10	62	(United Kingdom) Matthew Evans	1–12
(United Kingdom) Team Parker Racing	Porsche 992 GT3 Cup	Porsche 4.0 L Flat-6	75	(United Kingdom) Keith Bush	1–8, 13–22
(United Kingdom) Team Parker Racing	Porsche 992 GT3 Cup	Porsche 4.0 L Flat-6	75	(United Kingdom) Ed Pead	1–4
(United Kingdom) Orange Racing powered by JMH	Porsche 991 GT3 Cup II	Porsche 4.0 L Flat-6	999	(United Kingdom) Patrick Collins	All
(United Kingdom) Orange Racing powered by JMH	Porsche 991 GT3 Cup II	Porsche 4.0 L Flat-6	999	(United Kingdom) Russ Lindsay	All
Group GTH
(United Kingdom) Inari Motorsports	McLaren 570S GT4	McLaren 3.8 L Turbo V8	12	(United Kingdom) David Waddington	1–8
(United Kingdom) Inari Motorsports	McLaren 570S GT4	McLaren 3.8 L Turbo V8	12	(United Kingdom) Adam Wilcox	1–8
(United Kingdom) Racelab	McLaren Artura GT4	McLaren M630 3.0 L Turbo V6	13	(United Kingdom) Callum Davies	19–26
(United Kingdom) Racelab	McLaren Artura GT4	McLaren M630 3.0 L Turbo V6	13	(United Kingdom) Jon Lancaster	19–22
(United Kingdom) Racelab	McLaren Artura GT4	McLaren M630 3.0 L Turbo V6	13	(India) Sai Sanjay	23–26
(United Kingdom) Racelab	McLaren Artura GT4	McLaren M630 3.0 L Turbo V6	17	(United Kingdom) Michael O'Brien	19–22
(United Kingdom) Racelab	McLaren Artura GT4	McLaren M630 3.0 L Turbo V6	17	(China) Melly Zhang	19–22
(United Kingdom) Greystone GT	McLaren 570S GT4	McLaren 3.8 L Turbo V8	14	(United Kingdom) Michael Broadhurst	All
(United Kingdom) Greystone GT	McLaren 570S GT4	McLaren 3.8 L Turbo V8	14	(United Kingdom) Phil Carter	All
(United Kingdom) Ram Racing	Mercedes-AMG GT4	Mercedes-AMG M178 4.0 L V8	42	(United Kingdom) Seb Morris	1–8, 15–18, 23–26
(United Kingdom) Ram Racing	Mercedes-AMG GT4	Mercedes-AMG M178 4.0 L V8	42	(United Kingdom) Charles Dawson	1–4, 15–18, 23–26
(United Kingdom) Ram Racing	Mercedes-AMG GT4	Mercedes-AMG M178 4.0 L V8	42	(Switzerland) Gustavo Xavier	5–8
(United Kingdom) T4 with Brookspeed	McLaren 570S GT4	McLaren 3.8 L Turbo V8	63	(Republic of Ireland) Max Hart	1–4
(United Kingdom) T4 with Brookspeed	McLaren 570S GT4	McLaren 3.8 L Turbo V8	63	(United Kingdom) Mark Havers	1–4
(United Kingdom) / Make Happen Racing (Note: Entered as Make Happen Racing for rounds 1–14 and entered as Morpheus Racing for rounds 15–26.); (United Kingdom) / Morpheus Racing	Mercedes-AMG GT4	Mercedes-AMG M178 4.0 L V8	69	(United Kingdom) Chris Hart	All
(United Kingdom) / Make Happen Racing; (United Kingdom) / Morpheus Racing	Mercedes-AMG GT4	Mercedes-AMG M178 4.0 L V8	69	(United Kingdom) Stephen Walton	All
(United Kingdom) / Make Happen Racing; (United Kingdom) / Morpheus Racing	Mercedes-AMG GT4	Mercedes-AMG M178 4.0 L V8	96	(United Kingdom) Jon Currie	All
(United Kingdom) / Make Happen Racing; (United Kingdom) / Morpheus Racing	Mercedes-AMG GT4	Mercedes-AMG M178 4.0 L V8	96	(United Kingdom) Phil Keen	1–12, 15–26
(United Kingdom) Paddock Motorsport	McLaren 570S GT4 12; McLaren Artura GT4 10	McLaren 3.8 L Turbo V8 12; McLaren M630 3.0 L Turbo V6 10	78	(United Kingdom) Tim Docker	All
(United Kingdom) Paddock Motorsport	McLaren 570S GT4 12; McLaren Artura GT4 10	McLaren 3.8 L Turbo V8 12; McLaren M630 3.0 L Turbo V6 10	78	(United Kingdom) Gordie Mutch	1–4
(United Kingdom) Paddock Motorsport	McLaren 570S GT4 12; McLaren Artura GT4 10	McLaren 3.8 L Turbo V8 12; McLaren M630 3.0 L Turbo V6 10	78	(United Kingdom) Jordan Albert	5–14
(United Kingdom) Paddock Motorsport	McLaren 570S GT4 12; McLaren Artura GT4 10	McLaren 3.8 L Turbo V8 12; McLaren M630 3.0 L Turbo V6 10	78	(United Kingdom) Alex Walker	15–26
(United Kingdom) Feathers Motorsport	Aston Martin Vantage AMR GT4	Aston Martin 4.0 L Turbo V8	82	(United Kingdom) Tom Canning	1–18
(United Kingdom) Feathers Motorsport	Aston Martin Vantage AMR GT4	Aston Martin 4.0 L Turbo V8	82	(United Kingdom) James Guess	1–18
(United Kingdom) 24/7 Motorsport	Mercedes-AMG GT4	Mercedes-AMG M178 4.0 L V8	91	(United Kingdom) Ed Bridle	1–12, 15–26
(United Kingdom) 24/7 Motorsport	Mercedes-AMG GT4	Mercedes-AMG M178 4.0 L V8	91	(United Kingdom) David Frankland	1–12, 15–26
(United Kingdom) 24/7 Motorsport	Lotus Emira GT4	Toyota 2GR-FE 3.6 L V6	247	(Canada) Alana Carter	19–26
(United Kingdom) 24/7 Motorsport	Lotus Emira GT4	Toyota 2GR-FE 3.6 L V6	247	(Jamaica) Sara Misir	19–26

== Race results ==
Bold indicates the overall winner.

Round		Circuit	Date	Pole position	GTO Winners	GT3 Winners	GTC Winners	GTH Winners
1	R1	Donington Park	1 April	(United Kingdom) No. 32 J&S Racing	(United Kingdom) No. 28 Kendall Developments	**(United Kingdom) No. 32 J&S Racing**	(Italy) No. 19 AF Corse	(United Kingdom) No. 69 Make Happen Racing
1	R1	Donington Park	1 April	(United Kingdom) Hugo Cook (United Kingdom) Sacha Kakad	(United Kingdom) Paul Bailey (United Kingdom) Ross Wylie	**(United Kingdom) Hugo Cook** **(United Kingdom) Sacha Kakad**	(United Kingdom) Dan de Zille (United Kingdom) Graham de Zille	(United Kingdom) Chris Hart (United Kingdom) Stephen Walton
1	R2	Donington Park	1 April	(United Kingdom) No. 32 J&S Racing	(United Kingdom) No. 4 Tecserv UK by Triple M Motorsport	**(United Kingdom) No. 77 Enduro Motorsport**	(Italy) No. 19 AF Corse	(United Kingdom) No. 69 Make Happen Racing
1	R2	Donington Park	1 April	(United Kingdom) Hugo Cook (United Kingdom) Sacha Kakad	(United Kingdom) Grahame Tilley (United Kingdom) Sennan Fielding	**(United Kingdom) Marcus Clutton** **(United Kingdom) Morgan Tillbrook**	(United Kingdom) Dan de Zille (United Kingdom) Graham de Zille	(United Kingdom) Chris Hart (United Kingdom) Stephen Walton
1	R3	Donington Park	2 April	(United Kingdom) No. 76 7TSIX	(United Kingdom) No. 4 Tecserv UK by Triple M Motorsport	**(United Kingdom) No. 50 DriveTac powered by Track Focused**	(United Kingdom) No. 11 Blackthorn	(United Kingdom) No. 82 Feathers Motorsport
1	R3	Donington Park	2 April	(United Kingdom) Ian Loggie (United Kingdom) Casper Stevenson	(United Kingdom) Grahame Tilley (United Kingdom) Sennan Fielding	**(United Kingdom) Sam Maher-Loughnan** **(United Kingdom) James Wallis**	(United Kingdom) David McDonald (United Kingdom) Gilbert Yates	(United Kingdom) Tom Canning (United Kingdom) James Guess
1	R4	Donington Park	2 April	(United Kingdom) No. 77 Enduro Motorsport	(United Kingdom) No. 4 Tecserv UK by Triple M Motorsport	**(United Kingdom) No. 50 DriveTac powered by Track Focused**	(Italy) No. 19 AF Corse	(United Kingdom) No. 78 Paddock Motorsport
1	R4	Donington Park	2 April	(United Kingdom) Marcus Clutton (United Kingdom) Morgan Tillbrook	(United Kingdom) Grahame Tilley (United Kingdom) Sennan Fielding	**(United Kingdom) Sam Maher-Loughnan** **(United Kingdom) James Wallis**	(United Kingdom) Dan de Zille (United Kingdom) Graham de Zille	(United Kingdom) Tim Docker (United Kingdom) Gordie Mutch
2	R5	Brands Hatch	29 April	(United Kingdom) No. 50 DriveTac powered by Track Focused	(United Kingdom) No. 7 National Motorsport Academy	**(United Kingdom) No. 50 DriveTac powered by Track Focused**	(United Kingdom) No. 62 Woodrow Motorsport	(United Kingdom) No. 42 Ram Racing
2	R5	Brands Hatch	29 April	(United Kingdom) Sam Maher-Loughnan (United Kingdom) James Wallis	(United Kingdom) Marcus Short (United Kingdom) Morgan Short	**(United Kingdom) Sam Maher-Loughnan** **(United Kingdom) James Wallis**	(United Kingdom) Kevin Clarke (United Kingdom) Matthew Evans	(United Kingdom) Seb Morris (Switzerland) Gustavo Xavier
2	R6	Brands Hatch	29 April	(United Kingdom) No. 50 DriveTac powered by Track Focused	**(United Kingdom) No. 7 National Motorsport Academy**	(United Kingdom) No. 67 Orange Racing powered by JMH	(United Kingdom) No. 11 Blackthorn	(United Kingdom) No. 42 Ram Racing
2	R6	Brands Hatch	29 April	(United Kingdom) Sam Maher-Loughnan (United Kingdom) James Wallis	**(United Kingdom) Marcus Short** **(United Kingdom) Morgan Short**	(United Kingdom) Simon Orange (United Kingdom) Tom Roche	(United Kingdom) Gilbert Yates	(United Kingdom) Seb Morris (Switzerland) Gustavo Xavier
2	R7	Brands Hatch	30 April	(United Kingdom) No. 32 J&S Racing	(United Kingdom) No. 28 Kendall Developments	**(United Kingdom) No. 32 J&S Racing**	(United Kingdom) No. 2 Topcats Racing	(United Kingdom) No. 42 Ram Racing
2	R7	Brands Hatch	30 April	(United Kingdom) Hugo Cook (United Kingdom) Sacha Kakad	(United Kingdom) Paul Bailey (United Kingdom) Ross Wylie	**(United Kingdom) Hugo Cook** **(United Kingdom) Sacha Kakad**	(United Kingdom) Charlotte Gilbert (United Kingdom) Warren Gilbert	(United Kingdom) Seb Morris (Switzerland) Gustavo Xavier
2	R8	Brands Hatch	30 April	(United Kingdom) No. 32 J&S Racing	(United Kingdom) No. 7 National Motorsport Academy	**(United Kingdom) No. 13 Racelab**	(United Kingdom) No. 62 Woodrow Motorsport	(United Kingdom) No. 78 Paddock Motorsport
2	R8	Brands Hatch	30 April	(United Kingdom) Hugo Cook (United Kingdom) Sacha Kakad	(United Kingdom) Marcus Short (United Kingdom) Morgan Short	**(United Kingdom) Euan Hankey** **(United Kingdom) Lucky Khera**	(United Kingdom) Kevin Clarke (United Kingdom) Matthew Evans	(United Kingdom) Jordan Albert (United Kingdom) Tim Docker
3	R9	Snetterton	2 June	(United Kingdom) No. 67 Orange Racing powered by JMH	(United Kingdom) No. 76 7TSIX	**(United Kingdom) No. 67 Orange Racing powered by JMH**	(United Kingdom) No. 2 Topcats Racing	(United Kingdom) No. 69 Make Happen Racing
3	R9	Snetterton	2 June	(United Kingdom) Simon Orange (United Kingdom) Tom Roche	(United Kingdom) Ian Loggie (United Kingdom) Logan Hannah	**(United Kingdom) Simon Orange** **(United Kingdom) Tom Roche**	(United Kingdom) Charlotte Gilbert (United Kingdom) Gilbert Yates	(United Kingdom) Chris Hart (United Kingdom) Stephen Walton
3	R10	Snetterton	2 June	(United Kingdom) No. 67 Orange Racing powered by JMH	(United Kingdom) No. 28 Kendall Developments	**(United Kingdom) No. 67 Orange Racing powered by JMH**	(United Kingdom) No. 2 Topcats Racing	(United Kingdom) No. 82 Feathers Motorsport
3	R10	Snetterton	2 June	(United Kingdom) Simon Orange (United Kingdom) Tom Roche	(United Kingdom) Paul Bailey (United Kingdom) James Dorlin	**(United Kingdom) Simon Orange** **(United Kingdom) Tom Roche**	(United Kingdom) Charlotte Gilbert (United Kingdom) Gilbert Yates	(United Kingdom) Tom Canning (United Kingdom) James Guess
3	R11	Snetterton	3 June	(United Kingdom) No. 27 Optimum Motorsport	(United Kingdom) No. 28 Kendall Developments	**(United Kingdom) No. 50 DriveTac powered by Track Focused**	(United Kingdom) No. 2 Topcats Racing	(United Kingdom) No. 96 Make Happen Racing
3	R11	Snetterton	3 June	(United Kingdom) Rob Bell (United Kingdom) Mark Radcliffe	(United Kingdom) Paul Bailey (United Kingdom) James Dorlin	**(United Kingdom) Sam Maher-Loughnan** **(United Kingdom) James Wallis**	(United Kingdom) Charlotte Gilbert (United Kingdom) Gilbert Yates	(United Kingdom) Jon Currie (United Kingdom) Phil Keen
3	R12	Snetterton	3 June	(United Kingdom) No. 67 Orange Racing powered by JMH	(United Kingdom) No. 28 Kendall Developments	**(United Kingdom) No. 27 Optimum Motorsport**	(United Kingdom) No. 2 Topcats Racing	(United Kingdom) No. 96 Make Happen Racing
3	R12	Snetterton	3 June	(United Kingdom) Simon Orange (United Kingdom) Tom Roche	(United Kingdom) Paul Bailey (United Kingdom) James Dorlin	**(United Kingdom) Rob Bell** **(United Kingdom) Mark Radcliffe**	(United Kingdom) Charlotte Gilbert (United Kingdom) Gilbert Yates	(United Kingdom) Jon Currie (United Kingdom) Phil Keen
4	R13	Oulton Park	1 July	(United Kingdom) No. 32 J&S Racing	(United Kingdom) No. 28 Kendall Developments	**(United Kingdom) No. 32 J&S Racing**	(Italy) No. 19 AF Corse	(United Kingdom) No. 78 Paddock Motorsport
4	R13	Oulton Park	1 July	(United Kingdom) Hugo Cook (United Kingdom) Sacha Kakad	(United Kingdom) Paul Bailey (United Kingdom) Ross Wylie	**(United Kingdom) Hugo Cook** **(United Kingdom) Sacha Kakad**	(United Kingdom) Dan de Zille (United Kingdom) Graham de Zille	(United Kingdom) Jordan Albert (United Kingdom) Tim Docker
4	R14	Oulton Park	1 July	(Italy) No. 19 AF Corse	(United Kingdom) No. 28 Kendall Developments	**(United Kingdom) No. 67 Orange Racing powered by JMH**	(United Kingdom) No. 2 Topcats Racing	(United Kingdom) No. 69 Make Happen Racing
4	R14	Oulton Park	1 July	(United Kingdom) Dan de Zille (United Kingdom) Graham de Zille	(United Kingdom) Paul Bailey (United Kingdom) Ross Wylie	**(United Kingdom) Simon Orange** **(United Kingdom) Tom Roche**	(United Kingdom) Charlotte Gilbert (United Kingdom) Morgan Short	(United Kingdom) Chris Hart (United Kingdom) Stephen Walton
5	R15	Silverstone	29 July	(United Kingdom) No. 32 J&S Racing	(United Kingdom) No. 28 Kendall Developments	**(United Kingdom) No. 32 J&S Racing**	(United Kingdom) No. 26 FF Corse	(United Kingdom) No. 14 Greystone GT
5	R15	Silverstone	29 July	(United Kingdom) Hugo Cook (United Kingdom) Sacha Kakad	(United Kingdom) Paul Bailey (United Kingdom) Ross Wylie	**(United Kingdom) Hugo Cook** **(United Kingdom) Sacha Kakad**	(United Kingdom) Tom Fleming (United Kingdom) James Owen	(United Kingdom) Michael Broadhurst (United Kingdom) Phil Carter
5	R16	Silverstone	29 July	(United Kingdom) No. 67 Orange Racing powered by JMH	(United Kingdom) No. 28 Kendall Developments	**(United Kingdom) No. 67 Orange Racing powered by JMH**	(United Kingdom) No. 26 FF Corse	(United Kingdom) No. 42 Ram Racing
5	R16	Silverstone	29 July	(United Kingdom) Simon Orange (United Kingdom) Tom Roche	(United Kingdom) Paul Bailey (United Kingdom) Ross Wylie	**(United Kingdom) Simon Orange** **(United Kingdom) Tom Roche**	(United Kingdom) Tom Fleming (United Kingdom) James Owen	(United Kingdom) Charles Dawson (United Kingdom) Seb Morris
5	R17	Silverstone	30 July	(United Kingdom) No. 67 Orange Racing powered by JMH	(United Kingdom) No. 28 Kendall Developments	(United Kingdom) No. 32 J&S Racing	**(United Kingdom) No. 26 FF Corse**	(United Kingdom) No. 69 Morpheus Racing
5	R17	Silverstone	30 July	(United Kingdom) Simon Orange (United Kingdom) Tom Roche	(United Kingdom) Paul Bailey (United Kingdom) Ross Wylie	(United Kingdom) Hugo Cook (United Kingdom) Sacha Kakad	**(United Kingdom) Tom Fleming** **(United Kingdom) James Owen**	(United Kingdom) Chris Hart (United Kingdom) Stephen Walton
5	R18	Silverstone	30 July	(United Kingdom) No. 24 Greystone GT	(United Kingdom) No. 28 Kendall Developments	**(United Kingdom) No. 32 J&S Racing**	(United Kingdom) No. 26 FF Corse	(United Kingdom) No. 69 Morpheus Racing
5	R18	Silverstone	30 July	(Estonia) Andrey Borodin (United Kingdom) Ed Pead	(United Kingdom) Paul Bailey (United Kingdom) Ross Wylie	**(United Kingdom) Hugo Cook** **(United Kingdom) Sacha Kakad**	(United Kingdom) Tom Fleming (United Kingdom) James Owen	(United Kingdom) Chris Hart (United Kingdom) Stephen Walton
6	R19	Donington Park	16 September	(United Kingdom) No. 32 J&S Racing	(United Kingdom) No. 28 Kendall Developments	**(United Kingdom) No. 32 J&S Racing**	(United Kingdom) No. 2 Topcats Racing	(United Kingdom) No. 69 Morpheus Racing
6	R19	Donington Park	16 September	(United Kingdom) Hugo Cook (United Kingdom) Sacha Kakad	(United Kingdom) Paul Bailey (United Kingdom) Ross Wylie	**(United Kingdom) Hugo Cook** **(United Kingdom) Sacha Kakad**	(United Kingdom) Charlotte Gilbert (United Kingdom) Gilbert Yates	(United Kingdom) Chris Hart (United Kingdom) Stephen Walton
6	R20	Donington Park	16 September	(United Kingdom) No. 67 Orange Racing powered by JMH	(United Kingdom) No. 28 Kendall Developments	**(United Kingdom) No. 33 G-Cat Racing**	(United Kingdom) No. 2 Topcats Racing	(United Kingdom) No. 13 Racelab
6	R20	Donington Park	16 September	(United Kingdom) Simon Orange (United Kingdom) Tom Roche	(United Kingdom) Paul Bailey (United Kingdom) Ross Wylie	**(United Kingdom) Greg Caton** **(United Kingdom) Shamus Jennings**	(United Kingdom) Charlotte Gilbert (United Kingdom) Gilbert Yates	(United Kingdom) Callum Davies (United Kingdom) Jon Lancaster
6	R21	Donington Park	17 September	(United Kingdom) No. 9 Century Motorsport	(United Kingdom) No. 5 CTR Developments	**(United Kingdom) No. 9 Century Motorsport**	(United Kingdom) No. 999 Orange Racing powered by JMH	(United Kingdom) No. 13 Racelab
6	R21	Donington Park	17 September	(United Kingdom) Dan Harper (United Kingdom) Darren Leung	(United Kingdom) Richard Chamberlain (United Kingdom) Nigel Greensall	**(United Kingdom) Dan Harper** **(United Kingdom) Darren Leung**	(United Kingdom) Patrick Collins (United Kingdom) Russ Lindsay	(United Kingdom) Callum Davies (United Kingdom) Jon Lancaster
6	R22	Donington Park	17 September	(United Kingdom) No. 9 Century Motorsport	(United Kingdom) No. 28 Kendall Developments	**(United Kingdom) No. 9 Century Motorsport**	(United Kingdom) No. 2 Topcats Racing	(United Kingdom) No. 13 Racelab
6	R22	Donington Park	17 September	(United Kingdom) Dan Harper (United Kingdom) Darren Leung	(United Kingdom) Paul Bailey (United Kingdom) Ross Wylie	**(United Kingdom) Dan Harper** **(United Kingdom) Darren Leung**	(United Kingdom) Charlotte Gilbert (United Kingdom) Gilbert Yates	(United Kingdom) Callum Davies (United Kingdom) Jon Lancaster
7	R23	Snetterton	7 October	(United Kingdom) No. 32 J&S Racing	(United Kingdom) No. 88 Kendall Developments	**(United Kingdom) No. 32 J&S Racing**	(Italy) No. 19 AF Corse	(United Kingdom) No. 13 Racelab
7	R23	Snetterton	7 October	(United Kingdom) Hugo Cook (United Kingdom) Sacha Kakad	(United Kingdom) Marcus Short (United Kingdom) Morgan Short	**(United Kingdom) Hugo Cook** **(United Kingdom) Sacha Kakad**	(United Kingdom) Dan de Zille (United Kingdom) Graham de Zille	(United Kingdom) Callum Davies (India) Sai Sanjay
7	R24	Snetterton	7 October	(United Kingdom) No. 32 J&S Racing	(United Kingdom) No. 88 Kendall Developments	**(United Kingdom) No. 32 J&S Racing**	(Italy) No. 19 AF Corse	(United Kingdom) No. 13 Racelab
7	R24	Snetterton	7 October	(United Kingdom) Hugo Cook (United Kingdom) Sacha Kakad	(United Kingdom) Marcus Short (United Kingdom) Morgan Short	**(United Kingdom) Hugo Cook** **(United Kingdom) Sacha Kakad**	(United Kingdom) Dan de Zille (United Kingdom) Graham de Zille	(United Kingdom) Callum Davies (India) Sai Sanjay
7	R25	Snetterton	8 October	(United Kingdom) No. 76 7TSIX	(United Kingdom) No. 88 Kendall Developments	**(United Kingdom) No. 76 7TSIX**	(Italy) No. 19 AF Corse	(United Kingdom) No. 13 Racelab
7	R25	Snetterton	8 October	(United Kingdom) Tom Emson (United Kingdom) Ian Loggie	(United Kingdom) Marcus Short (United Kingdom) Morgan Short	**(United Kingdom) Tom Emson** **(United Kingdom) Ian Loggie**	(United Kingdom) Dan de Zille (United Kingdom) Graham de Zille	(United Kingdom) Callum Davies (India) Sai Sanjay
7	R26	Snetterton	8 October	(United Kingdom) No. 76 7TSIX	(United Kingdom) No. 28 Kendall Developments	**(United Kingdom) No. 67 Orange Racing powered by JMH**	(United Kingdom) No. 2 Topcats Racing	(United Kingdom) No. 14 Greystone GT
7	R26	Snetterton	8 October	(United Kingdom) Tom Emson (United Kingdom) Ian Loggie	(United Kingdom) Paul Bailey (United Kingdom) James Dorlin	**(United Kingdom) Simon Orange** **(United Kingdom) Tom Roche**	(United Kingdom) Charlotte Gilbert (United Kingdom) Sam Neary	(United Kingdom) Michael Broadhurst (United Kingdom) Phil Carter

== Championship standings ==
Points are awarded as follows:

System	1st	2nd	3rd	4th	5th	6th	7th	8th	9th	10th	PP	Fastest lap
3+	25	18	15	12	10	8	6	4	2	1	1	1
2	18	15									1	1
1	15										1	1

=== Overall ===
(key)

Pos.	Drivers	No.	Class	DON1				BRH				SNE1				OUL‡		SIL				DON2				SNE2				Pts
1	(United Kingdom) Paul Bailey	28	GTO	4	4	7	6	7	22	6	6	12	8	10	8	7	6	7	7	12	8	7	5	5	5	6	6	8	7	591
1	(United Kingdom) Ross Wylie	28	GTO	4	4	7	6	7	22	6	6					7	6	7	7	12	8	7	5	5	5					591
1	(United Kingdom) James Dorlin	28	GTO									12	8	10	8											6	6	8	7	591
2	(United Kingdom) Hugo Cook (United Kingdom) Sacha Kakad	32	GT3	**1**	**5**	6	4	6	3	**1**	**2**	2	17	6	2	**1**	2	**1**	2	**3**	1	**1**	8	2	4	**1**	**1**	2	2	540.5
3	(United Kingdom) Charlotte Gilbert	2	GTC	8	8	9	DSQ	10	20	8	Ret	9	7	7	9	5	4	9	9	8	5	5	7	DSQ	6	7	8	6	5	518
3	(United Kingdom) Warren Gilbert	2	GTC	8	8	9	DSQ	10	20	8	Ret																			518
3	(United Kingdom) Gilbert Yates	2	GTC									9	7	7	9			9	9	8	5	5	7	DSQ	6					518
3	(United Kingdom) Morgan Short	2	GTC													5	4													518
3	(United Kingdom) Sam Neary	2	GTC																							7	8	6	5	518
4	(United Kingdom) Simon Orange (United Kingdom) Tom Roche	67	GT3	DNS	Ret	DNS	7	2	2	4	4	**1**	**1**	4	**4**	2	1	19	**1**	**6**	2	2	**2**	DSQ	2	2	3	3	1	453
5	(United Kingdom) Chris Hart (United Kingdom) Stephen Walton	69	GTH	11	18	16	14	20	13	14	DSQ	13	10	14	14	13	8	Ret	16	2	9	10	13	10	11	12	14	10	Ret	449
6	(United Kingdom) Jon Currie	96	GTH	18	12	20	17	13	Ret	16	DSQ	16	12	12	11	11	9	16	14	17	DNS	14	14	9	9	14	11	12	10	410
6	(United Kingdom) Phil Keen	96	GTH	18	12	20	17	13	Ret	16	DSQ	16	12	12	11			16	14	17	DNS	14	14	9	9	14	11	12	10	410
7	(Republic of Ireland) Chris Murphy	72	GTO	17	17	17	20	16	14	12	10	14	Ret	16	10	12	10	13	11	15	13	12	10	8	8	9	9	17	14	405.5
8	(United Kingdom) Michael Broadhurst (United Kingdom) Phil Carter	14	GTH	15	15	14	15	18	16	19	DSQ	17	13	18	12	9	13	11	13	10	10	13	15	16	NC	15	13	14	8	372
9	(United Kingdom) Tim Docker	78	GTH	16	13	18	11	15	17	17	9	18	14	15	15	8	12	15	Ret	DNS	DNS	16	12	11	10	16	12	15	12	353.5
9	(United Kingdom) Gordie Mutch	78	GTH	16	13	18	11																							353.5
9	(United Kingdom) Jordan Albert	78	GTH					15	17	17	9	18	14	15	15	8	12													353.5
9	(United Kingdom) Alex Walker	78	GTH															15	Ret	DNS	DNS	16	12	11	10	16	12	15	12	353.5
10	(United Kingdom) Patrick Collins (United Kingdom) Russ Lindsay	999	GTC	22	14	13	12	11	11	9	8	10	11	11	Ret	6	7	20	DNS	7	12	9	9	6	Ret	WD	WD	WD	WD	350.5
11	(United Kingdom) Tom Canning (United Kingdom) James Guess	82	GTH	13	10	11	13	14	15	13	DSQ	15	9	13	13	10	11	14	Ret	DNS	DNS									266.5
12	(United Kingdom) Greg Caton (United Kingdom) Shamus Jennings	33	GT3					9	5	7	3	7	6	8	6			6	6	9	17	6	1	13	3					260
13	(United Kingdom) Keith Bush	75	GTC	20	20	19	19	17	21	18	11	19	15	DNS	DNS			17	15	16	16	15	Ret	DNS	DNS					237
13	(United Kingdom) Ed Pead	75	GTC	20	WD	WD	WD																							237
14	(United Kingdom) Marcus Short (United Kingdom) Morgan Short	7	GTO	5	DNS	Ret	Ret	3	1	DSQ	5																			216
14	(United Kingdom) Jay Shepherd	7	GTO															10	18	14	15	8	6	4	Ret	8	17	WD	WD	216
15	(United Kingdom) Ed Bridle (United Kingdom) David Frankland	91	GTH	21	19	15	22	Ret	18	15	DNS	20	16	17	16			18	17	5	14	18	16	15	DNS	17	16	13	Ret	185
16	(Estonia) Andrey Borodin (United Kingdom) Ed Pead	24	GT3					21	9	Ret	DSQ					4	3	8	8	13	**6**									121.5
17	(United Kingdom) Richard Chamberlain	5	GTO	DNS	DNS	DNS	DNS	Ret	8	DNS	DNS							Ret	DNS	DNS	DNS	Ret	DNS	3	13					60
17	(United Kingdom) Nigel Greensall	5	GTO																			Ret	DNS	3	13					60
Entries ineligible to score points
	(United Kingdom) Sam Maher-Loughnan (United Kingdom) James Wallis	50	GT3	2	DNS	1	1	**1**	**Ret**	2	Ret	5	2	1	5															
	(United Kingdom) Darren Leung	9	GT3									3	5	5	3							3	3	**1**	**1**					
	(Finland) Jesse Krohn	9	GT3									3	5	5	3															
	(United Kingdom) Dan Harper	9	GT3																			3	3	**1**	**1**					
	(United Kingdom) Ian Loggie	76	GT3	Ret	6	**2**	3																			3	2	**1**	3	
	(United Kingdom) Casper Stevenson	76	GT3	Ret	6	**2**	3																							
	(United Kingdom) Paul Rogers (United Kingdom) James Wallis	76	GT3															2	3	18	7									
	(United Kingdom) Tom Emson	76	GT3																							3	2	**1**	3	
	(United Kingdom) Logan Hannah (United Kingdom) Ian Loggie	76	GTO									8	DNS																	
	(United Kingdom) Kevin Clarke	76	GTO											Ret	Ret															
	(United Kingdom) Rob Bell (United Kingdom) Mark Radcliffe	27	GT3									4	4	**2**	1															
	(United Kingdom) James Owen (United Kingdom) Tom Fleming	26	GTC															3	5	1	3									
	(United Kingdom) Marcus Clutton	77	GT3	3	1	5	**2**	5	4	5	DNS	6	3	3	17															
	(United Kingdom) Morgan Tillbrook	77	GT3	3	1	5	**2**	5	4	5	DNS																			
	(United Kingdom) Matt Topham	77	GT3									6	3	3	17															
	(United Kingdom) Euan Hankey (United Kingdom) Lucky Khera	13	GT3	10	3	3	8	4	6	3	1																			
	(United Kingdom) Grahame Tilley (United Kingdom) Sennan Fielding	4	GTO	6	2	4	5	WD	WD	WD	WD											WD	WD	WD	WD					
	(United Kingdom) Dan de Zille (United Kingdom) Graham de Zille	19	GTC	7	7	10	9									3	**5**	5	10	4	4					5	7	5	6	
	(United Kingdom) Marcus Short (United Kingdom) Morgan Short	88	GTO																							4	4	4	DNS	
	(United Kingdom) Iain Campbell (United Kingdom) Duncan Tappy	23	GT3																			4	4	17	Ret					
	(United Kingdom) Adam Knight (United Kingdom) Euan McKay	8	GT3															4	4	Ret	DNS									
	(United Kingdom) Marcus Clutton (United Kingdom) Patrick Collins	999	GT3																							10	5	7	4	
	(United Kingdom) Kevin Clarke (United Kingdom) Matthew Evans	62	GTC	9	9	21	10	8	10	10	7	11	Ret	DNS	DNS															
	(United Kingdom) Callum Davies	13	GTH																			11	11	7	7	11	10	9	9	
	(United Kingdom) Jon Lancaster	13	GTH																			11	11	7	7					
	(India) Sai Sanjay	13	GTH																							11	10	9	9	
	(United Kingdom) Gilbert Yates	11	GTC	Ret	DNS	8	16	DSQ	7	Ret	DNS																			
	(United Kingdom) David McDonald	11	GTC	Ret	DNS	8	16																							
	(United Kingdom) Seb Morris	42	GTH	14	11	12	18	12	12	11	DSQ							12	12	11	11					13	DSQ	11	11	
	(United Kingdom) Charles Dawson	42	GTH	14	11	12	18											12	12	11	11					13	DSQ	11	11	
	(Switzerland) Gustavo Xavier	42	GTH					12	12	11	DSQ																			
	(United Kingdom) Michael O'Brien (China) Melly Zhang	17	GTH																			18	18	14	12					
	(Canada) Alana Carter (Jamaica) Sara Misir	247	GTH																			17	17	12	NC	18	18	16	13	
	(Republic of Ireland) Max Hart (United Kingdom) Mark Havers	63	GTH	12	DNS	22	21																							
	(United Kingdom) David Waddington (United Kingdom) Adam Wilcox	12	GTH	19	16	Ret	DNS	19	19	DNS	DNS																			
	(United Kingdom) Rich Mason (United Kingdom) Duncan Tappy	22	GT3													Ret	DNS													
Pos.	Drivers	No.	Class	DON1				BRH				SNE1				OUL‡		SIL				DON2				SNE2				Pts

Key
Colour	Result
Gold	Winner
Silver	Second place
Bronze	Third place
Green	Other points position
Blue	Other classified position
Blue	Not classified, finished (NC)
Purple	Not classified, retired (Ret)
Red	Did not qualify (DNQ)
Red	Did not pre-qualify (DNPQ)
Black	Disqualified (DSQ)
White	Did not start (DNS)
White	Race cancelled (C)
Blank	Did not practice (DNP)
Blank	Excluded (EX)
Blank	Did not arrive (DNA)
Blank	Withdrawn (WD)
Blank	Did not enter (cell empty)
Text formatting	Meaning
**Bold**	Pole position
Italics	Fastest lap

‡ – Race 1 at Oulton Park was stopped after 3 laps due to an accident in heavy rain and half points were awarded.

=== Classes ===
(key)

Pos.	Drivers	No.	DON1				BRH				SNE1				OUL‡		SIL				DON2				SNE2				Pts
Group GTO
1	(United Kingdom) Paul Bailey	28	4	4	7	6	7	22	6	**6**	**12**	8	**10**	**8**	**7**	**6**	**7**	**7**	**12**	**8**	7	**5**	5	5	6	6	8	7	479
1	(United Kingdom) Ross Wylie	28	4	4	7	6	7	22	6	**6**					**7**	**6**	**7**	**7**	**12**	**8**	7	**5**	5	5					479
1	(United Kingdom) James Dorlin	28									**12**	8	**10**	**8**											6	6	8	7	479
2	(Republic of Ireland) Chris Murphy	72	17	17	17	20	16	14	12	10	14	Ret	16	10	12	10	13	11	15	13	12	10	8	8	9	9	17	14	405.5
3	(United Kingdom) Marcus Short (United Kingdom) Morgan Short	7	**5**	DNS	Ret	Ret	**3**	**1**	**DSQ**	5																			249
3	(United Kingdom) Jay Shepherd	7															10	18	14	15	8	6	**4**	Ret	8	17	WD	WD	249
4	(United Kingdom) Richard Chamberlain	5	DNS	DNS	DNS	DNS	Ret	8	DNS	DNS							Ret	DNS	DNS	DNS	Ret	DNS	3	**13**					60
4	(United Kingdom) Nigel Greensall	5																			Ret	DNS	3	**13**					60
Entries ineligible to score points
	(United Kingdom) Grahame Tilley (United Kingdom) Sennan Fielding	4	6	**2**	**4**	**5**	WD	WD	WD	WD											WD	WD	WD	WD					
	(United Kingdom) Marcus Short (United Kingdom) Morgan Short	88																							**4**	**4**	**4**	**DNS**	
	(United Kingdom) Logan Hannah (United Kingdom) Ian Loggie	76									8	**DNS**																	
	(United Kingdom) Kevin Clarke	76											Ret	Ret															
Group GT3
1	(United Kingdom) Hugo Cook (United Kingdom) Sacha Kakad	32	**1**	**5**	6	4	6	3	**1**	**2**	2	17	6	2	**1**	2	**1**	2	3	1	**1**	8	2	4	**1**	**1**	2	2	540.5
2	(United Kingdom) Simon Orange (United Kingdom) Tom Roche	67	DNS	Ret	DNS	7	2	2	4	4	**1**	**1**	4	**4**	2	**1**	19	**1**	**6**	2	2	**2**	DSQ	2	2	3	3	1	453
3	(United Kingdom) Greg Caton (United Kingdom) Shamus Jennings	33					9	5	7	3	7	6	8	6			6	6	9	17	6	1	13	3					260
4	(Estonia) Andrey Borodin (United Kingdom) Ed Pead	24					21	9	Ret	DSQ					4	3	8	8	13	**6**									121.5
Entries ineligible to score points
	(United Kingdom) Sam Maher-Loughnan (United Kingdom) James Wallis	50	2	DNS	1	1	**1**	**Ret**	2	Ret	5	2	1	5															
	(United Kingdom) Darren Leung	9									3	5	5	3							3	3	**1**	**1**					
	(Finland) Jesse Krohn	9									3	5	5	3															
	(United Kingdom) Dan Harper	9																			3	3	**1**	**1**					
	(United Kingdom) Ian Loggie	76	Ret	6	**2**	3																			3	2	**1**	**3**	
	(United Kingdom) Casper Stevenson	76	Ret	6	**2**	3																							
	(United Kingdom) Paul Rogers (United Kingdom) James Wallis	76															2	3	18	7									
	(United Kingdom) Tom Emson	76																							3	2	**1**	**3**	
	(United Kingdom) Marcus Clutton	77	3	1	5	**2**	5	4	5	DNS	6	3	3	17															
	(United Kingdom) Morgan Tillbrook	77	3	1	5	**2**	5	4	5	DNS																			
	(United Kingdom) Matt Topham	77									6	3	3	17															
	(United Kingdom) Euan Hankey (United Kingdom) Lucky Khera	13	10	3	3	8	4	6	3	1																			
	(United Kingdom) Rob Bell (United Kingdom) Mark Radcliffe	27									4	4	**2**	1															
	(United Kingdom) Iain Campbell (United Kingdom) Duncan Tappy	23																			4	4	17	Ret					
	(United Kingdom) Adam Knight (United Kingdom) Euan McKay	8															4	4	Ret	DNS									
	(United Kingdom) Marcus Clutton (United Kingdom) Patrick Collins	999																							10	5	7	4	
	(United Kingdom) Rich Mason (United Kingdom) Duncan Tappy	22													Ret	DNS													
Group GTC
1	(United Kingdom) Charlotte Gilbert	2	8	**8**	**9**	DSQ	10	**20**	8	Ret	**9**	**7**	**7**	**9**	**5**	4	9	**9**	8	**5**	**5**	**7**	**DSQ**	**6**	**7**	8	**6**	5	432
1	(United Kingdom) Warren Gilbert	2	8	**8**	**9**	DSQ	10	**20**	8	Ret																			432
1	(United Kingdom) Gilbert Yates	2									**9**	**7**	**7**	**9**			9	**9**	8	**5**	**5**	**7**	**DSQ**	**6**					432
1	(United Kingdom) Morgan Short	2													**5**	4													432
1	(United Kingdom) Sam Neary	2																							**7**	8	**6**	5	432
2	(United Kingdom) Patrick Collins (United Kingdom) Russ Lindsay	999	22	14	13	12	11	11	9	8	10	11	11	Ret	6	7	20	DNS	7	12	9	9	6	**Ret**	WD	WD	WD	WD	350.5
3	(United Kingdom) Keith Bush	75	20	20	19	19	17	21	18	11	19	15	DNS	DNS			17	15	16	16	15	Ret	DNS	DNS					237
3	(United Kingdom) Ed Pead	75	20	WD	WD	WD																							237
Entries ineligible to score points
	(United Kingdom) Dan de Zille (United Kingdom) Graham de Zille	19	**7**	7	10	9									3	**5**	5	10	4	4					5	**7**	5	**6**	
	(United Kingdom) James Owen (United Kingdom) Tom Fleming	26															**3**	5	**1**	3									
	(United Kingdom) Gilbert Yates	11	Ret	DNS	8	**16**	DSQ	7	**Ret**	**DNS**																			
	(United Kingdom) David McDonald	11	Ret	DNS	8	**16**																							
	(United Kingdom) Kevin Clarke (United Kingdom) Matthew Evans	62	9	9	21	10	8	10	10	7	11	Ret	DNS	DNS															
Group GTH
1	(United Kingdom) Chris Hart (United Kingdom) Stephen Walton	69	**11**	**18**	**16**	14	20	**13**	14	DSQ	**13**	**10**	14	14	**13**	8	Ret	16	2	**9**	10	13	10	11	12	14	10	Ret	449
2	(United Kingdom) Jon Currie	96	18	12	20	17	13	Ret	16	DSQ	16	12	**12**	11	11	9	16	14	17	DNS	14	14	9	9	14	11	12	10	410
2	(United Kingdom) Phil Keen	96	18	12	20	17	13	Ret	16	DSQ	16	12	**12**	11			16	14	17	DNS	14	14	9	9	14	11	12	10	410
3	(United Kingdom) Michael Broadhurst (United Kingdom) Phil Carter	14	15	15	14	15	**18**	16	19	DSQ	17	13	18	**12**	9	13	11	13	**10**	10	13	15	16	NC	15	13	14	8	372
4	(United Kingdom) Tim Docker	78	16	13	18	11	15	17	17	9	18	14	15	15	8	12	15	Ret	DNS	DNS	16	12	11	10	16	12	15	12	353.5
4	(United Kingdom) Gordie Mutch	78	16	13	18	11																							353.5
4	(United Kingdom) Jordan Albert	78					15	17	17	9	18	14	15	15	8	12													353.5
4	(United Kingdom) Alex Walker	78															15	Ret	DNS	DNS	16	12	11	10	16	12	15	12	353.5
5	(United Kingdom) Tom Canning (United Kingdom) James Guess	82	13	10	11	13	14	15	13	DSQ	15	9	13	13	10	11	14	Ret	DNS	DNS									266.5
6	(United Kingdom) Ed Bridle (United Kingdom) David Frankland	91	21	19	15	22	Ret	18	15	DNS	20	16	17	16			18	17	5	14	18	16	15	DNS	17	16	13	Ret	241
Entries ineligible to score points
	(United Kingdom) Callum Davies	13																			**11**	**11**	**7**	**7**	**11**	**10**	**9**	**9**	
	(United Kingdom) Jon Lancaster	13																			**11**	**11**	**7**	**7**					
	(India) Sai Sanjay	13																							**11**	**10**	**9**	**9**	
	(United Kingdom) Seb Morris	42	14	11	12	**18**	12	12	**11**	**DSQ**							**12**	**12**	11	11					13	DSQ	11	11	
	(United Kingdom) Charles Dawson	42	14	11	12	**18**											**12**	**12**	11	11					13	DSQ	11	11	
	(Switzerland) Gustavo Xavier	42					12	12	**11**	**DSQ**																			
	(Republic of Ireland) Max Hart (United Kingdom) Mark Havers	63	12	DNS	22	21																							
	(United Kingdom) Michael O'Brien (China) Melly Zhang	17																			18	18	14	12					
	(Canada) Alana Carter (Jamaica) Sara Misir	247																			17	17	12	NC	18	18	16	13	
	(United Kingdom) David Waddington (United Kingdom) Adam Wilcox	12	19	16	Ret	DNS	19	19	DNS	DNS																			
Pos.	Drivers	No.	DON1				BRH				SNE1				OUL‡		SIL				DON2				SNE2				Pts

‡ – Race 1 at Oulton Park was stopped after 3 laps due to an accident in heavy rain and half points were awarded.

=== Teams ===
(key)

Pos.	Team	Manufacturer	DON1				BRH				SNE1				OUL‡		SIL				DON2	SNE2	Pts
1	(United Kingdom) Orange Racing powered by JMH	McLaren; Porsche	22	14	13	7	2	2	4	4	**1**	**1**	4	**4**	2	1	19	**1**	**6**	2			494.5
1	(United Kingdom) Orange Racing powered by JMH	McLaren; Porsche	DNS	Ret	DNS	12	11	11	9	8	10	11	11	Ret	6	7	20	DNS	7	12			494.5
2	(United Kingdom) / Make Happen Racing; (United Kingdom) / Morpheus Racing	Mercedes-AMG	11	18	16	14	13	13	14	DSQ	13	10	12	11	11	8	16	14	2	9			473
2	(United Kingdom) / Make Happen Racing; (United Kingdom) / Morpheus Racing	Mercedes-AMG	18	12	20	17	20	Ret	16	DSQ	16	12	14	14	13	9	Ret	16	17	DNS			473
3	(United Kingdom) Kendall Developments	Brabham; Mercedes-AMG; Lamborghini	4	4	7	6	7	22	6	6	12	8	10	8	7	6	7	7	12	8			371
4	(United Kingdom) Woodrow Motorsport	BMW; Lamborghini	9	9	21	10	8	10	10	7	11	Ret	16	10	12	10	13	11	15	13			357.5
4	(United Kingdom) Woodrow Motorsport	BMW; Lamborghini					16	14	12	10	14	Ret	DNS	DNS									357.5
5	(United Kingdom) J&S Racing	Audi	**1**	**5**	6	4	6	3	**1**	**2**	2	17	6	2	**1**	2	**1**	2	3	1			332.5
6	(United Kingdom) Greystone GT	Lamborghini; McLaren	15	15	14	15	18	9	19	DSQ	17	13	18	12	4	3	8	8	10	**6**			328.5
6	(United Kingdom) Greystone GT	Lamborghini; McLaren					21	16	Ret	DSQ					9	13	11	13	13	10			328.5
7	(United Kingdom) Topcats Racing	Lamborghini	8	8	9	DSQ	10	20	8	Ret	9	7	7	9	5	4	9	9	8	5			318
8	(United Kingdom) Feathers Motorsport	Aston Martin	13	10	11	13	14	15	13	DSQ	15	9	13	13	10	11	14	Ret	DNS	DNS			248.5
9	(Italy) AF Corse	Ferrari	7	7	10	9									3	**5**	5	10	4	4			218.5
10	(United Kingdom) Paddock Motorsport	McLaren	16	13	18	11	15	17	17	9	18	14	15	15	8	12	15	Ret	DNS	DNS			191.5
11	(United Kingdom) DriveTac powered by Track Focused	Mercedes-AMG	2	DNS	1	1	**1**	**Ret**	2	Ret	5	2	1	5									188
12	(United Kingdom) 24-7 Motorsport	Audi; Mercedes-AMG	17	17	15	20	Ret	18	15	DNS	20	16	17	16			18	17	5	14			188
12	(United Kingdom) 24-7 Motorsport	Audi; Mercedes-AMG	21	19	17	22																	188
13	(United Kingdom) Team Parker Racing	Porsche	20	20	19	19	17	21	18	11	19	15	DNS	DNS			17	15	16	16			172
14	(United Kingdom) National Motorsport Academy	Lotus; Mosler	5	DNS	Ret	Ret	3	1	DSQ	5							10	18	14	15			159
15	(United Kingdom) Enduro Motorsport	McLaren	3	1	5	**2**	5	4	5	DNS	6	3	3	17									154
16	(United Kingdom) G-Cat Racing	Porsche					9	5	7	3	7	6	8	6			6	6	9	17			141
17	(United Kingdom) Ram Racing	Mercedes-AMG	14	11	12	18	12	12	11	DSQ							4	4	11	11			130
17	(United Kingdom) Ram Racing	Mercedes-AMG															12	12	Ret	DNS			130
18	(United Kingdom) 7TSIX	Audi; McLaren	Ret	6	**2**	3					8	DNS	Ret	Ret			2	3	18	7			127
19	(United Kingdom) Racelab	McLaren	10	3	3	8	4	6	3	1													120
20	(United Kingdom) Tecserv UK by Triple M Motorsport	Mercedes-AMG	6	2	4	5	WD	WD	WD	WD													94
21	(United Kingdom) Blackthorn	Lamborghini	Ret	DNS	8	16	DSQ	7	Ret	DNS													62
22	(United Kingdom) CTR Developments	Porsche	DNS	DNS	DNS	DNS	22	6	DNS	DNS							Ret	DNS	DNS	DNS			30
23	(United Kingdom) T4 with Brookspeed	McLaren	12	DNS	22	21																	30
24	(United Kingdom) Inari Motorsports	McLaren	19	16	Ret	DNS	19	19	DNS	DNS													20
Entries ineligible to score points
	(United Kingdom) Optimum Motorsport	McLaren									4	4	**2**	1									
	(United Kingdom) FF Corse	Ferrari															3	5	1	3			
	(United Kingdom) Century Motorsport	BMW									3	5	5	3									
Pos.	Team	Manufacturer	DON1				BRH				SNE1				OUL‡		SIL				DON2	SNE2	Pts
