= Ross Wylie =

Scottish racing driver

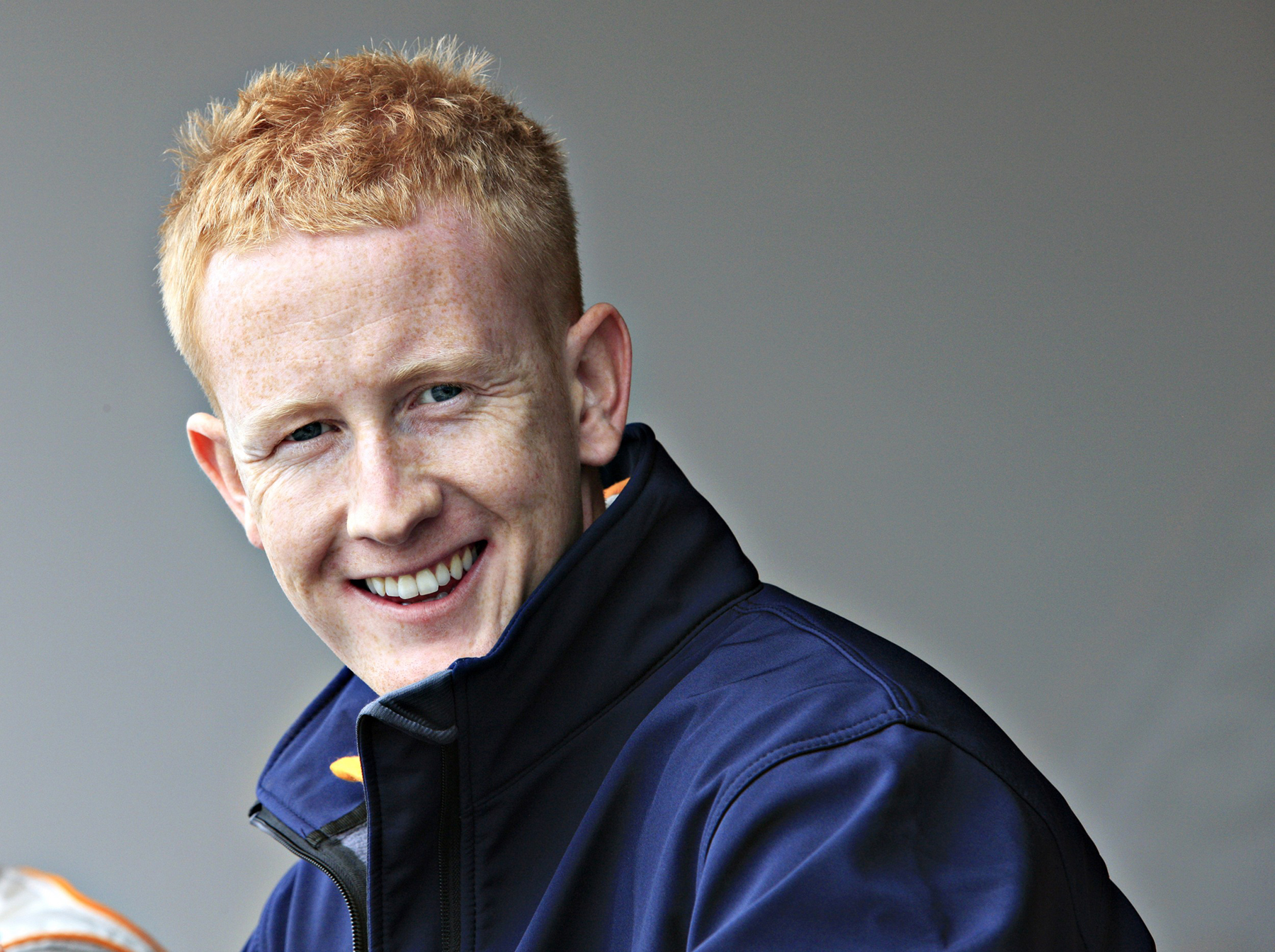
- Nationality: Scottish
- Born: 15 September 1991 (age 35) Dumfries, Scotland

Porsche Carrera Cup, British GT, GT Cup and Britcar career
- Debut season: 2004 (Karts); 2012 (Cars)
- Current team: Toro Verde GT)
- Car number: 29
- Former teams: Valluga Racing; Simon Green Motorsport; In2Racing; FF Corse; MJC Furlonger; Motorbase Performance; Von Ryan Racing; Beechdean Motorsport; SlideSports
- Wins: 26
- Podiums: 48
- Poles: 9
- Best finish: 1 in 2014, 2017, 2018, 2020, 2021, 2023

Previous series
- 2024 2023 2023 2022 2022 2022 2021 2020 2019 2018 2017 2017 2016, 2015, 2014 2013: Porsche Carrera Cup; GT Cup; Porsche Carrera Cup; GT Cup; British GT; Porsche Carrera Cup; GT Cup; Britcar (Endurance); Britcar (Endurance); Britcar (Sprint); Britcar; Porsche Carrera Cup; British GT; Volkswagen Scirocco R-Cup; Volkswagen UK Racing Cup; Celtic Speed Mini Cooper Cup

Championship titles
- 2023 2021 2020 2018 2017 2014: GT Cup; GT Cup GTO; Britcar Endurance C2; Britcar Sprint S1; Britcar; British GT4 Championship

Ross Wylie (born 15 September 1991) is a Scottish racing driver. He started his motor racing career contesting the 2004 Mini Max Kart Championship, becoming a multiple kart champion in his native Scotland over the next eight years, before moving up to car racing in 2012.

Having competed in the Volkswagen Scirocco R-Cup and Volkswagen UK Racing Cup in 2013, Wylie won the British GT4 Championship the following year, co-driving the Beechdean Motorsport Aston Martin Vantage with Jake Giddings.

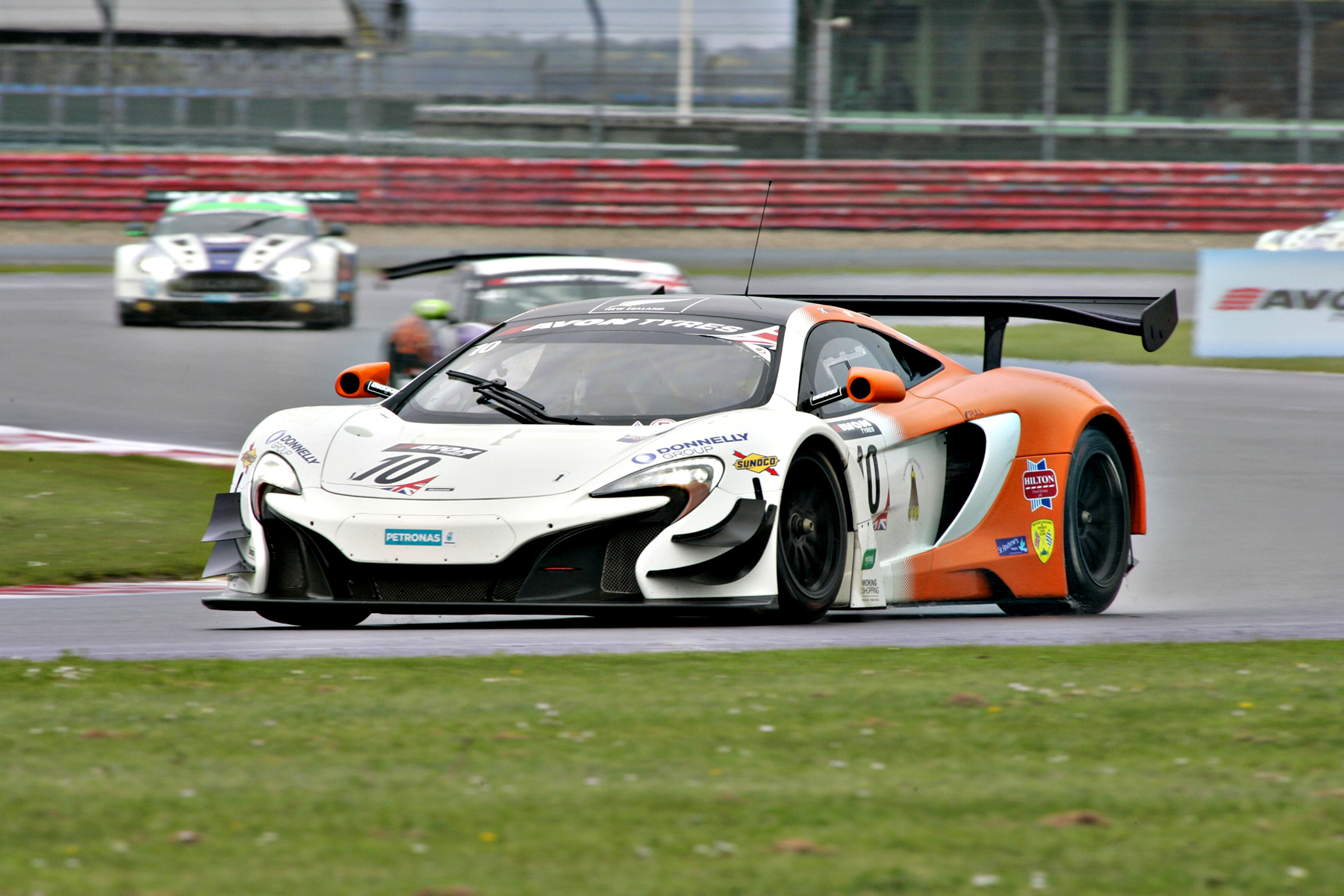
BGT-31.05.15 0688

Selected as a McLaren GT "Young Driver" in 2015, Wylie spent that year and the next competing in the British GT Championship, challenging for outright race wins with Von Ryan Racing, driving a McLaren 650S GT3 followed by a Motorbase Performance Aston Martin Vantage GT3 in 2016.

In 2017, Wylie won the Britcar Endurance Championship in the MJC Furlonger-prepared Ferrari 458 GT, taking ten overall podiums, including four wins.

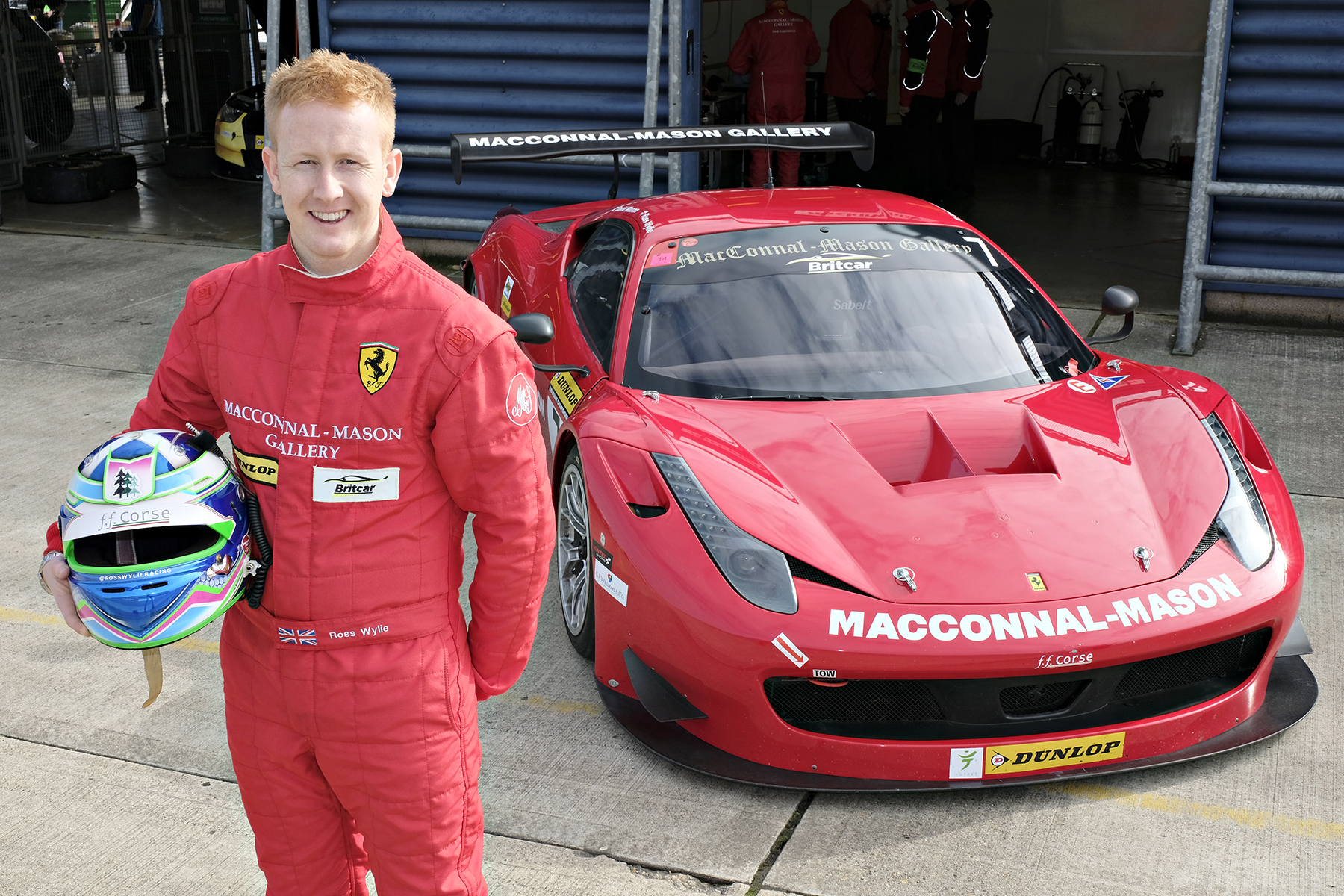
BRITCAR-14.04.18 0667

Wylie contested the 2018 Britcar series with FF Corse, co-driving a Ferrari 458 GT3 with David Mason. He completed the year by winning the Sprint S1 category, claiming 13 class podiums, including four class wins. Wylie is also an ARDS-qualified (Association of Racing Driver Schools) instructor. Having been nominated as a BRDC (British Racing Drivers’ Club) Rising Star in 2013, he was selected as a BRDC "SuperStar" two years later.

During 2019, Wylie completed seven rounds of the Britcar Endurance Championship, securing three class poles and six top-four placings. He also competed once in the GT Cup Championship (GTC class FF Corse Ferrari 488 Challenge, class podium) and achieved a top-five finish in all four rounds of the Porsche Carrera Cup GB that he contested.

In 2020, Wylie returned to the Porsche Carrera Cup GB with In2Racing, and competed in 16 races, finishing the season seventh overall. Wylie also contested 6 Britcar Endurance Championship races with SB Race Engineering Ferrari 488 to secure the C2 Class title, second overall.

The 2021 season saw Wylie competing across four domestic championships. At the wheel of three different cars prepared by SB Race Engineering (Ferrari 488, Brabham BT62 Competition and McLaren MP4-12C Can Am) he took the GTO title in the GT Cup, with nine podiums, six class wins, six fastest laps and one overall victory. He supported that with six appearances in the Porsche Carrera Cup GB for Valluga Racing, and a race apiece in the Britcar Endurance Championship (a C2 class win) and the British GT Championship (third in GT3SA), both with Simon Green Motorsport.

Wylie started the 2022 season with a defence of his GT Cup GTO Championship title, co-driving with Paul Bailey. In the first four races, the duo managed four class podiums. Wylie entered the British GT Championship, contesting the GT4 class. Sharing a Valluga Racing Porsche 718 Cayman with Matthew Graham, he contested six races, finishing second in the prestigious Silverstone 500. Ross also competed in three rounds of the Porsche Carrera Cup.

In 2023, Wylie stepped down into the Pro-Am class as he contested the Porsche Carrera Cup GB with Redline Racing, finishing runner-up in the Pro-Am Championship, seven points behind the class winner. He also made a return to the GT Cup with SB Race Engineering, driving three different chassis ( Brabham BT62 Competition, Mercedes AMG GT3 and Lamborghini Huracán) to claim the overall GT Cup title.

In 2024, Wylie returned to team Toro Verde GT to contest the 2024 Porsche Carrera Cup in the Pro-Am class, and competed in ten of the season's 16 races, finishing the year eighth in the championship's Pro-Am standings. He also shared a Bentley Continental with Witt Gamski for one round of the British Endurance Championship. The duo also raced in the Masters Endurance Legends, recording two G2/GT3 race wins and two fastest laps at the Silverstone Classic.

== Early career ==
Wylie was born in Thornhill, in the Dumfries and Galloway region of Scotland in 1991, and began his motor racing career aged 13 in karts. His first season, in the 2004 Mini Max Kart Championship, was followed by three years contesting the Scottish Junior Rotax Max Kart Championship, culminating in his taking the title in 2007. That same year he took the West of Scotland Club Kart Championship and finishing third in the Motors TV Karting Challenge.

Wylie's dominance of Scottish junior karting continued into 2008, when Wylie retained his West of Scotland Club title, but began an equally effective move south of the border, contesting and winning the 2008 Rotax Cup as well as the Junior Rotax Max "British Stars of Tomorrow" Kart Championship. In a busy year, he also finished third in the Super One National Junior Max Kart Championship.

For another three seasons, Wylie continued to be a front-runner in British junior karting, winning the Rotax Winter Cup and British Open Kart Championship in 2010, and then the Rotax Max Gold Cup in 2011.

== Cars ==
In 2012, Wylie made his circuit racing debut, contesting the Celtic Speed Mini Cooper Cup, and securing six podiums, two wins, two poles and four fastest laps. This not only earned him the title of Knockhill Young Saloon Car Driver of the Year, but also the SMRC (Scottish Motor Racing Club) Ecurie Ecosse Hubcap Trophy. This prestigious award; a genuine winged wheel-nut from the Ecurie Ecosse 1956 Le Mans-winning D-Type Jaguar, is given annually to the most promising Young Scottish Driver of the Year. Former winners include Paul di Resta, Dario Franchitti, Allan McNish and David Coulthard.

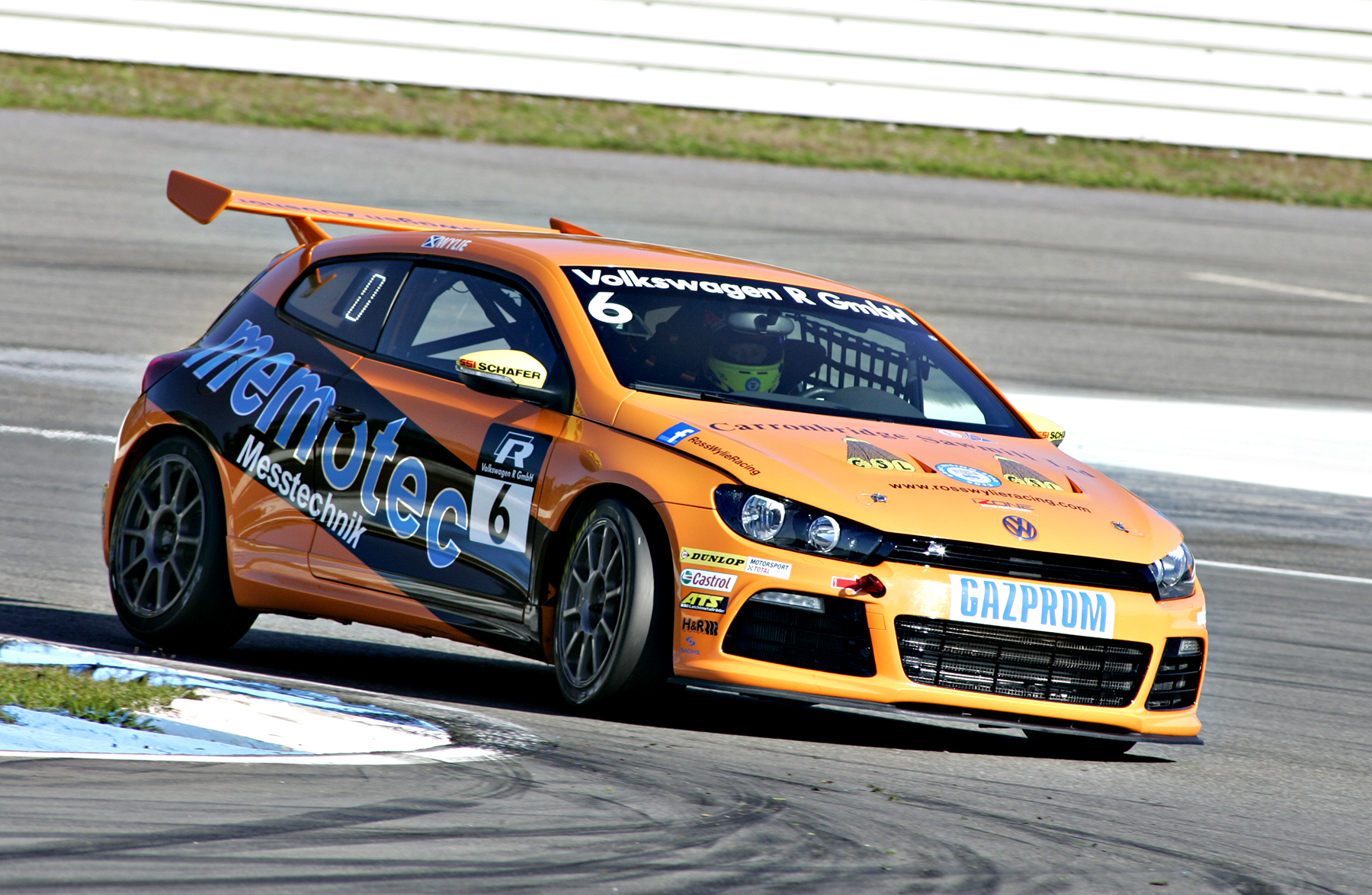
HOCKENHEIM-19.10.13 0136

The following season, 2013, saw Wylie step up to the Volkswagen Scirocco R-Cup, where he closed the year by taking fifth overall and the Junior Cup, securing five podiums, including one win and one pole position. He dovetailed that by claiming sixth in the Volkswagen UK Racing Cup (five podiums, three wins and two poles) for SlideSports. As a consequence, Wylie was selected as the BRDC "Rising Star" of 2013.

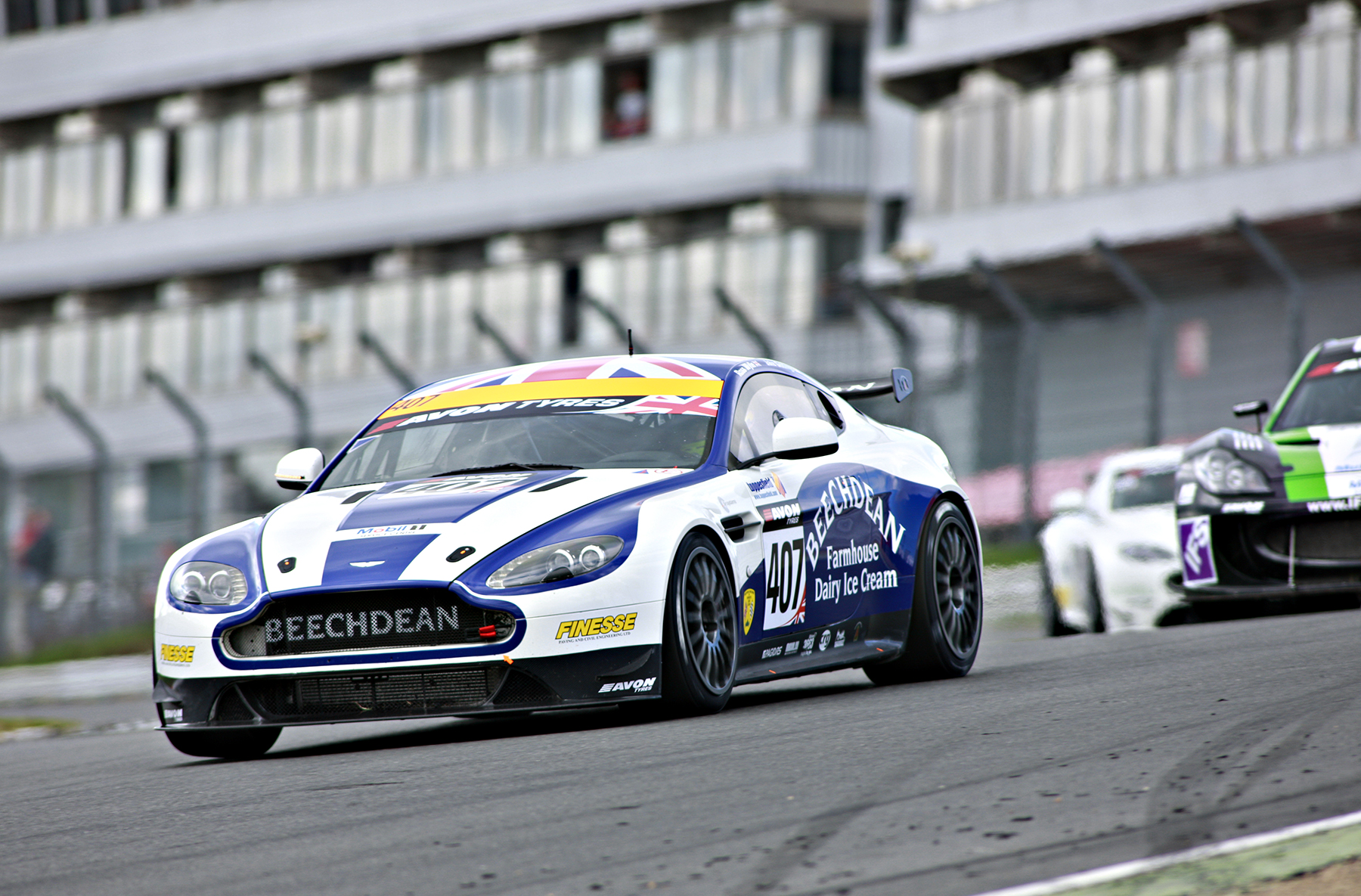
BGT-31.08.14 0206

2014 became a standout year for Wylie. Signed to Beechdean Motorsport, he contested the ten-round British GT Championship with fellow Briton Jake Giddings. The pairing won the GT4 class at the opening round at Oulton Park, and followed this with seven further class podiums, including two more wins (at Spa and Brands Hatch) with two pole position starts. They clinched the title at the final round at Donington Park. Selected as the McLaren GT "Young Driver" of the Year, Wylie joined the McLaren Driver Academy programme alongside Andrew Watson, and competed in the 2015 British GT Championship, racing a McLaren 650S GT3 for Von Ryan Racing. Wylie finished the season second in the Silver Cup (15th overall) with six top-ten finishes from nine races. He was subsequently invited to participate in the coveted BRDC "SuperStar" scheme.

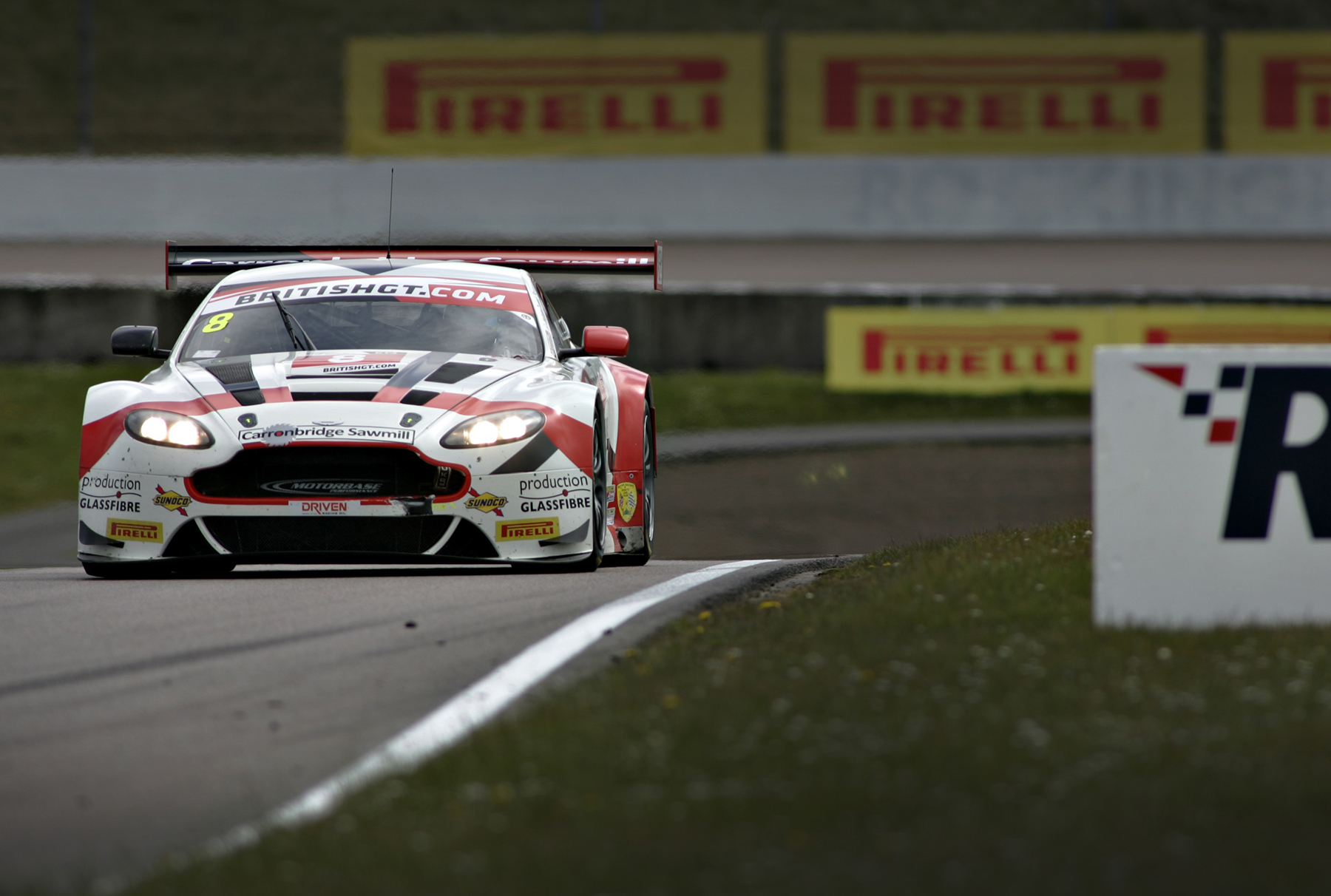
BGT-R2-01.05.16 0771

Wylie returned to British GT in 2016, joining Motorbase Performance to partner fellow Scot Phil Dryburgh in the team's single Aston Martin V12 Vantage GT3. The duo secured five top-ten finishes from nine starts to complete the year 11th in the Championship. Wylie then rounded off the year on a high, finishing the demanding Gulf 12 Hours in Abu Dhabi with 5th overall, sharing the SlideSports Porsche Cayman GT4 with co-drivers Wayne Marrs and David Fairbrother.

After three seasons in British GT, Wylie made the move to the Britcar Endurance Series for 2017. Co-driving a Ferrari 458 GT prepared by MJC Furlonger with Witt Gamski, the Scot took 10 podiums overall, including four wins, to secure the title in the final round at Brands Hatch. Class victory in both the day's races gave the duo a 19-point advantage as the series ended. It was Wylie's fourth British national title. Concurrent with his Britcar campaign, Wylie also competed with SlideSports in the Porsche Carrera Cup GB, missing two Britcar rounds to focus on his Porsche programme. In the fifteen-race series, he finished in the top-ten in eight out of the 12 races he completed to secure 11th overall. He was the best-placed Rookie driver of the season, and made his Le Mans circuit debut when the Carrera Cup acted as support to the 24 Hours in June.

== 2018 season ==
In the 2018 season Wylie once again competed in the Britcar Dunlop Endurance Championship (Sprint Category), partnering gentleman-driver David Mason in the GT3-specification Ferrari 458 prepared by FF Corse. The pair finished second overall (Sprint S1 Class second) in the first race of the opening round at Rockingham, with Wylie setting fastest lap, and then third overall (Class third) in the weekend's second race. Second in the Sprint S1 class (again with fastest lap to Wylie) in both Silverstone races was followed by a brace of second places (4th and 7th overall, with fastest lap set by Wylie in both races) at Oulton Park. In July, Britcar arrived at Donington Park, where Wylie was again the fastest man on track in Race 1 before retirement, but was back on the podium (2nd in S1, 3rd overall) in Race 2, despite starting 28th. In early September, Britcar arrived at Snetterton, where the Wylie/Mason pairing took their first S1 class win (2nd overall) in the day's opening Sprint race, repeating this in the second (tenth overall), with Wylie fastest in the 25-lap evening race. The season's penultimate round, back at Silverstone in October, saw the duo taking S1 class wins on both races (2nd and first overall) with fastest laps to Wylie in each. In the final meeting of the season, Wylie and Mason again took top honours in the first Sprint race (second overall, Wylie setting fastest lap), and followed that with another podium (third) in the weekend's second race. Wylie and Mason ended the season as S1 Class winners, second overall in the Sprint Category Championship.

In July 2018, Wylie fulfilled a dream by demonstrating Allan McNish's 1998 Le Mans-winning Porsche 911 GT1 at the Goodwood Festival of Speed. Wylie cites McNish as one of his childhood inspirations.

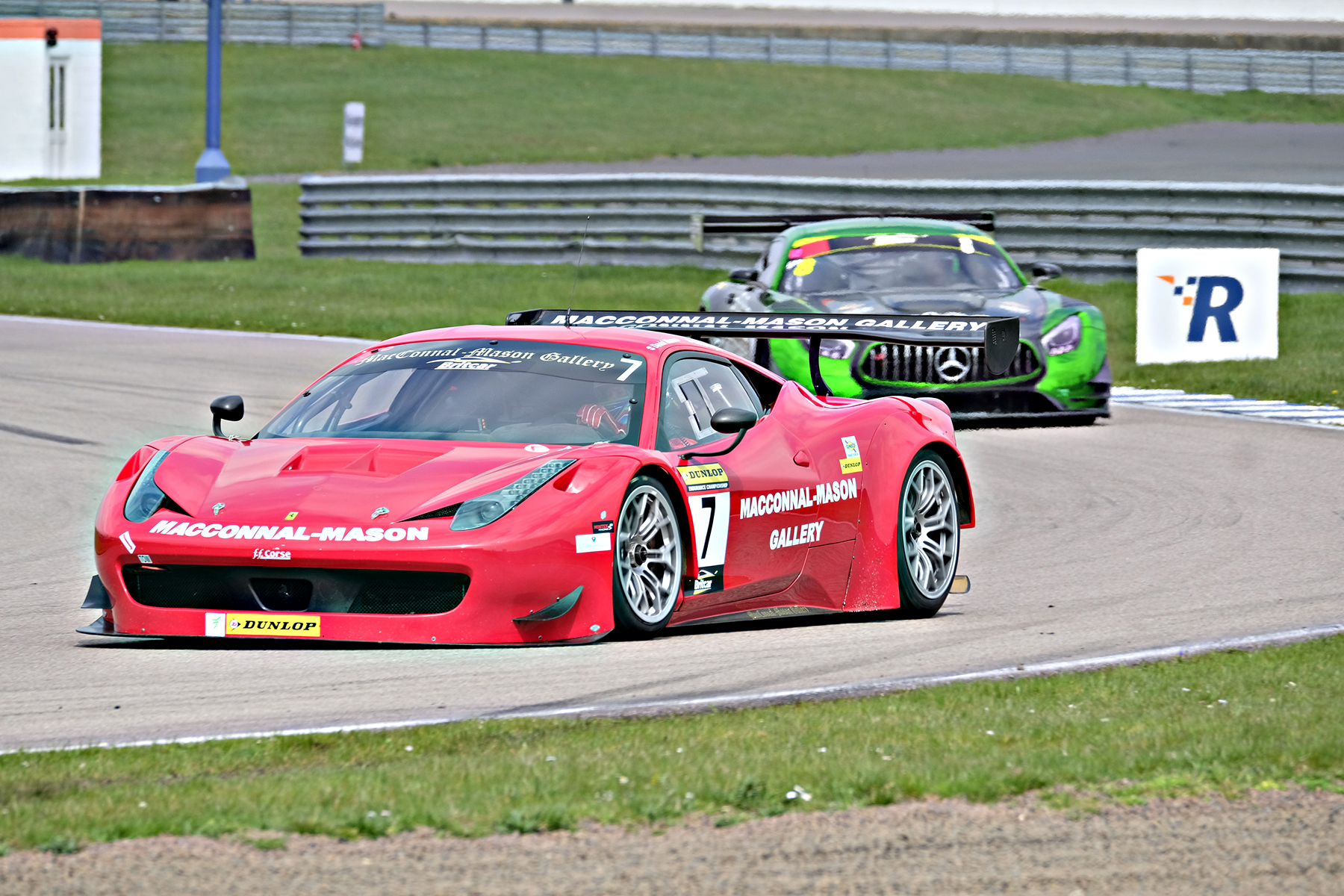
BRITCAR-14.04.18 0816

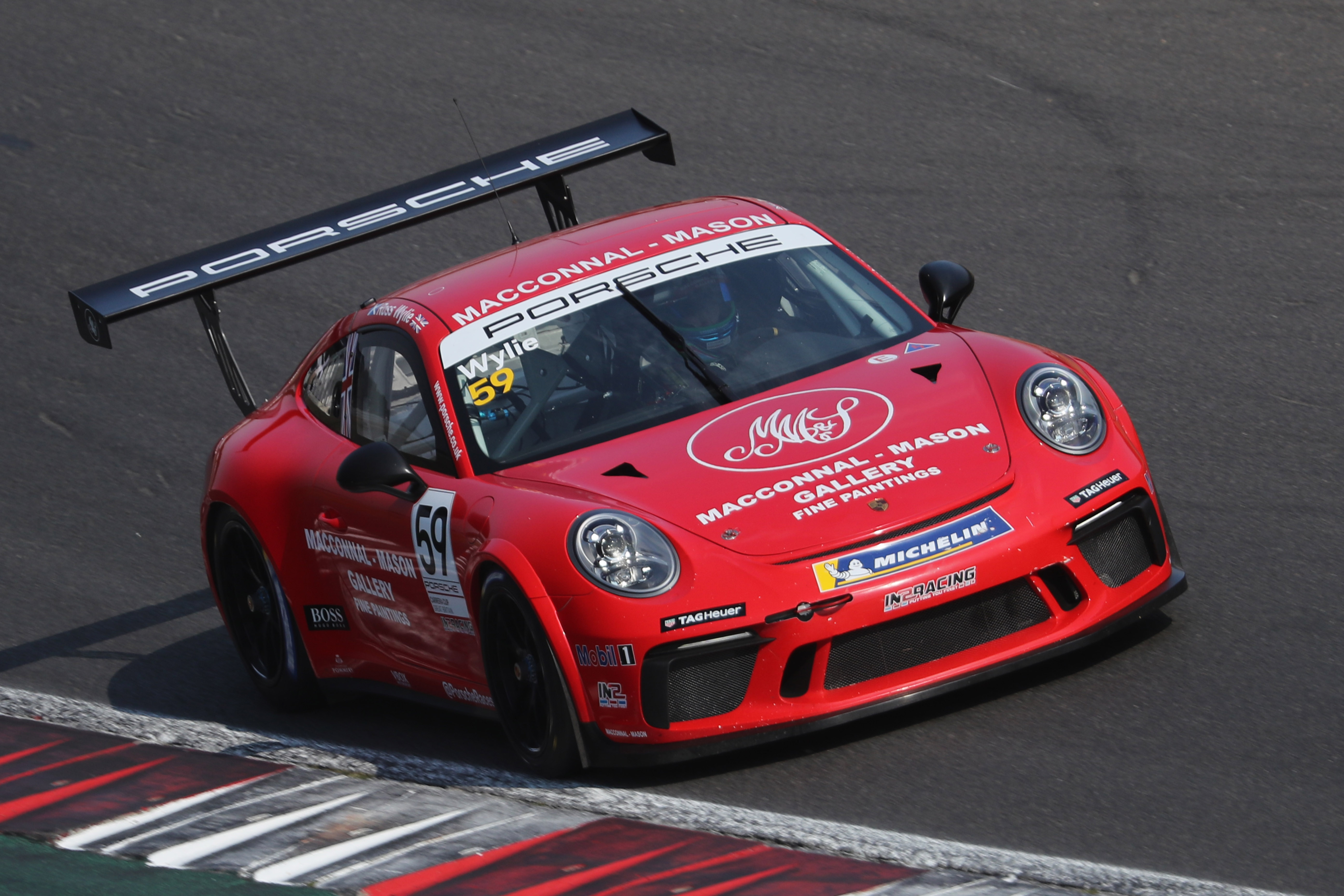
Scottish racing driver Ross Wylie contested the 2020 Porsche Carrera Cup GB with In2Racing

== 2019 season ==
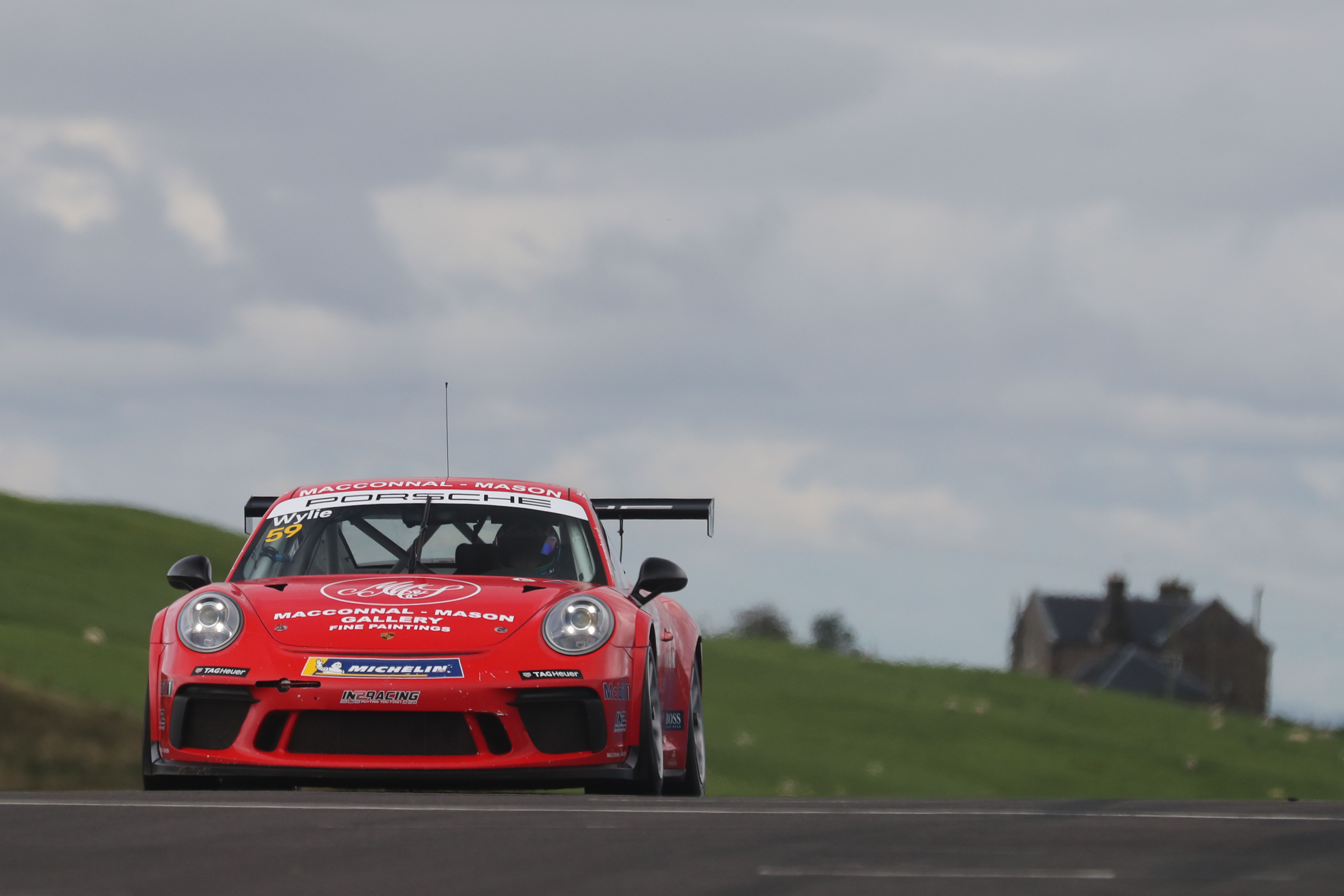
Ross Wylie achieved nine top-six placings, including one outright win, in the 2020 Porsche Carrera Cup GB

At the beginning of 2019, Mason and Wylie's season did not get off to a great start, despite qualifying first in Class 2 and third overall, the only managed to finish eleventh and fourth in class. Round two on the GP style of Silverstone was more in favour of the FF Corse duo, they finished fifth in race one and third in class, race two resulted in a Ferrari 488 1-2-3, with veteran Mason and Wylie finishing third overall and third in Class 2. At Brands Hatch, they qualified first overall and once again finished fifth overall and second in class. Race two was worse for the pair, they finished twelfth unfortunately. Donington, round four, became their worst outing of the season. They had begun to lead the race from second on the grid. They led most of the race, unfortunately, ten laps shy of the end of the race, they collided with the TCR-spec SEAT Leon of Ashley Woodman, which resulted in both cars retiring from the race. The car had received some damage to the front left and did not make it to start race two.

== 2020 season ==
Wylie completed a full season of motor racing in 2020, despite the pandemic. He rounded off the year by finishing sixth and fifth respectively in the final two rounds of the Porsche Carrera Cup GB at Brands Hatch, thereby securing 7th overall in the championship. Having started the first of these two 30-minute races from 11th on the 18-car grid, he worked through a wet race to finish sixth at the flag. The next day, he followed this with fifth in the dry to round off his Porsche season with a total of nine top-six placings, including two podiums and one outright win at Thruxton.

In the Dunlop Britcar Endurance Championship, Wylie took C2 class honours for the third time in four years, second overall, and just five points behind the outright winners despite only contesting six of the year's ten races. Partnered by Paul Bailey in the SB Race Engineering Ferrari 488 Challenge, Ross netted six top-three class finishes, including three wins, as well as setting four fastest race laps from six race starts.

Wylie also contested one race in the 2020 GT Cup Championship, claiming a class win and fastest lap, and entered a single round of the British GT Championship, crossing the line fourth in class. Both events saw Wylie co-driving a Ferrari 488 Challenge prepared by Simon Green Motorsport.

== 2021 season ==
Wylie contested no less than four different British race series in 2021, his biggest success being in the GT Cup Championship, where he took the GTO class title alongside Paul Bailey.

== 2022 season ==
Wylie competed again in the GTO class of the GT Cup Championship, recording a brace of second-place finishes at the opening two races at Donington Park in April, together with co-driver Paul Bailey. For those first two races they shared a McLaren MP4-12C GT3 Cam Am prepared by SB Race Engineering. Later that month, at Brands Hatch, the team fielded a Brabham BT62 Competition. A return to the McLaren MP4 just 24 hours later for the second day's Sprint event saw them claim a class win.

Wylie returned to the GT4 category of the British GT Championship eight years after he last claimed the title, sharing a Porsche 718 Cayman GT4 RS Clubsport backed by AL-2 Teknik UK, prepared by Valluga Racing. His co-drivers were Valluga Concierge team-owner Benji Hetherington for the first two races at Oulton Park, including a third-placed podium in Race 1, and then Matthew Graham for the Silverstone, Donington Park and Snetterton events. This included second place in the Silverstone 500 in May.

Wylie also contested three rounds of the Porsche Carrera Cup, with races at Oulton Park, Knockhill and Silverstone. In these events he raced a Porsche 911 GT3 Cup (Type 992) entered by Toro Verde GT.

== 2023 season ==
In 2023, Wylie returned to the Porsche Carrera Cup Championship but stepped down into the Pro-Am category at the wheel of the Glenturret Porsche 911, prepared by Redline Racing. His best overall result was fifth place at round 4 Brands Hatch Indy. But finished in the Pro-Am category top-five on 13 occasions in the 16-race series, securing nine podiums and six wins. He completed the season as runner-up in the Pro-Am Championship, seven-points behind the class winner.

Wylie claimed overall GT Cup Championship honours for the first time. As the only car to contest every round, Wylie and co-driver Paul Bailey closed out the season more than 50-points ahead of their nearest pursuers in the outright title race and 185 points to the fore in the GTO category.

In the GTO category, Wylie claimed nine podiums, including six wins, and four class fastest laps in a variety of GT cars, despite missing four races due to clashing commitments. Throughout the championship, Wylie drove three different cars prepared by Kendall Developments – a Brabham BT62 Competition, a Mercedes AMG GT3 and, in the latter stages of the season, a Lamborghini Huracán.

== 2024 season ==
For the 2024 season, Wylie returned to team Toro Verde GT in the Porsche Carrera Cup where we entered the Pro-Am category. With sponsorship from The Glenturret whisky distillery, his Scottish-blue ‘Type 992’ Porsche 911 GT3 Cup contested ten of 16 races, Round 1 at Donington Park he crossed the line 13th overall and third in the Pro-Am class. Rounds 2, 3 and 4 at Brands Hatch in May, he finished sixth, sixth and seventh in class respectively. The championship's next outing, at Thruxton in June, saw another podium for Wylie, third in Round 5 after starting fifth overall, 'pole' in class 'pole'. He then ran in sixth once more for Round 6. The Porsches headed north for Rounds 7 and 8, at Croft, where Wylie took fourth in Pro-Am for the weekend's first race, and fifth in the second. Wylie's 'home' race at Knockhill in August saw him finish fifth in Pro-Am for both races. That proved to be his final appearance in the Porsche Carrera Cup for the season.

Wylie headed to Silverstone over the August Bank Holiday weekend to compete in the Masters Historic Racing "Endurance Legends" race at the Silverstone Classic Festival. Co-driving a Bentley Continental GT3 with Witt Gamski, he took second in the GT class in Race 1, behind Cor Euser's Marcos LM600 Evo, and then matched that for Race 2, closing on the Dutchman in the final stages.

The driving partnership of Wylie and Gamski also appeared in Round 3 of the British Endurance Championship race at Silverstone in June in class A. Wylie and Gamski finished second against Peter Erceg and Marcus Clutton in their Audi GT3 which was the only other car in class.

== Racing record ==
=== Complete Britcar results ===
(key) (Races in bold indicate pole position in class – 1 point awarded just in first race) (Races in italics indicate fastest lap in class – 1 point awarded all races)

Year	Team	Car	Class	1	2	3	4	5	6	7	8	9	10	11	12	13	14	15	16	DC	CP	Points
2017	MJC Furlonger Ltd	Ferrari 458 GTE	E1	SIL; 1; 3	SIL; 2; 5	**SNE**; **1**; 3	SNE; 2; 1	**SIL**; **1**; 1	SIL; 2; 1	BRH; 1	BRH; 2	DON; 1; 2	DON; 2; 14	OUL; 1; 3	OUL; 2; 6	SIL; 1; 1	BRH; 1; 2	BRH; 2; 2		1st	1st	306
2018	FF Corse	Ferrari 458 GT3	S1	**ROC**; **1**; 2	ROC; 2; 3	**SIL**; **1**; 5	SIL; 2; 2	**OUL**; **1**; 4	OUL; 2; 7	DON; 1 Ret	DON; 2; 3	**SNE**; **1**; 1	SNE; 2; 2	**SIL**; **1**; 2	SIL; 2; 1	**BRH**; **1**; 2	BRH; 1; 1			4th	1st	257
2019	FF Corse	Ferrari 488 Challenge	2	SIL; 1; 11	SIL; 2; 6	SIL; 1; 5	SIL; 2; 3	**BRH**; **1**; 5	BRH; 2; 12	DON; 1 Ret	DON; 2 DNS	OUL; 1	OUL; 2	SNE; 1	SNE; 2	OUL; 1	OUL; 2	BRH; 1	BRH; 2	12th	4th	148
2020	SB Race Engineering	Ferrari 488 Challenge	2	CRO; 1; 2	CRO; 2; 3	BRH; 1	BRH; 2	OUL; 1	SIL; 1; 3	SIL; 2; 3	SNE; 1; 4	SNE; 2; 3								2nd	1st	197
2021	Simon Green Motorsport	Ferrari 488 Challenge Evo	2	SIL; 1; 8	SIL; 2 DNS	SNE; 1 DNS	SNE; 2 DNS	OUL; 1	OUL; 2	SIL; 1	BRH; 1	BRH; 1	DON; 1	DON; 2	BRH; 1	BRH; 1				25th	1st	23

=== Partial GT Cup Championship results ===
(key) (Races in bold indicate pole position in class – 1 point awarded just in first race; races in italics indicate fastest lap in class – 1 point awarded all races;-

Year	Team	Car	Class	1	2	3	4	5	6	7	8	9	10	11	12	13	14	15	16	17	18	19	20	DC	CP	Points
2020	Simon Green Motorsport	Ferrari 488 Challenge	GTC	SNE; 1	SNE; 2	SNE; 3	SNE; 4	SIL; 1; 2	SIL; 2; 2	SIL; 3; 2	SIL; 4; 1	DON1; 1	DON1; 2	DON1; 3	DON1; 4	BRH; 1	BRH; 2	BRH; 3	BRH; 4	DON2; 1	DON2; 2	DON2; 3	DON2; 4	NC†	NC†	0†

† Wylie was ineligible for points as he was an invitation entry.
