= GT Cup Championship =

UK sports car racing series

- Category: Gran Turismo
- Country: United Kingdom
- Inaugural season: 2007
- Drivers: Varies
- Teams: Varies
- Tyre suppliers: Pirelli
- Drivers' champion: Group GTO: (United Kingdom) Ian Loggie (United Kingdom) Richard Neary; Group GT3: (United Kingdom) Greg Caton (United Kingdom) Shamus Jennings; Group GTC: (United Kingdom) Charlotte Gilbert (United Kingdom) Tom Rawlings; Group GTH: (United Kingdom) Sam Nesey (United Kingdom) Mikey Porter; Group GTA: (United Kingdom) John Ingram (United Kingdom) Rupert Williams
- Teams' champion: Topcats Racing

The GT Cup Championship is a sports car racing series based in the United Kingdom. It was founded by Marc Haynes in 2007. The championship supported the short-lived British LMP3 Cup in 2017, following the series to Spa-Francorchamps where it participated alongside the field of prototypes. It supported the 2021 GT World Challenge Europe Sprint Cup at Brands Hatch on 1–2 May. GT Cup Championship events consist of 1 free practice session, 1 qualifying session and 2 races per day; the first being a 25-minute sprint and the second being a 50-minute endurance race with driver changes.

== Classes ==
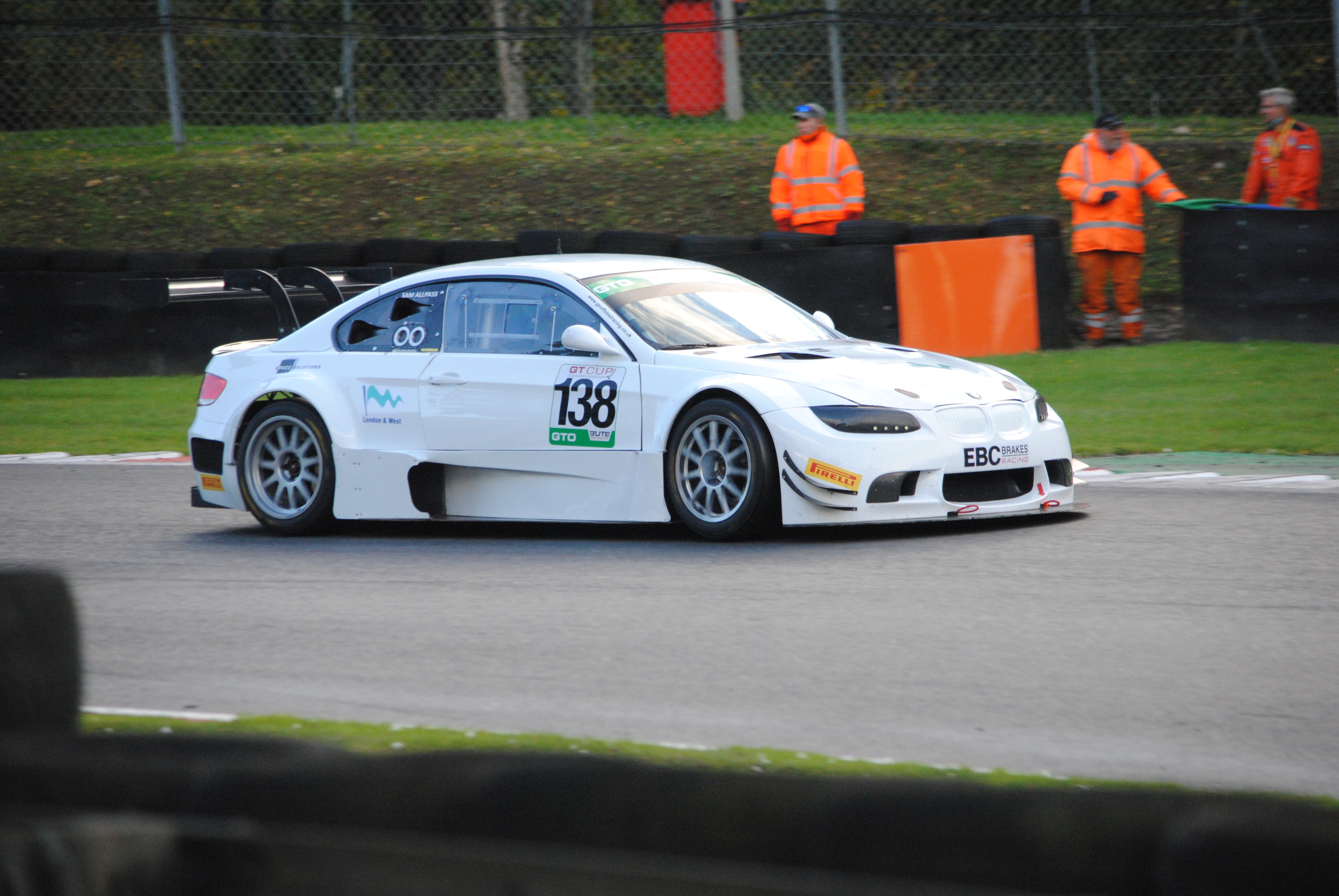
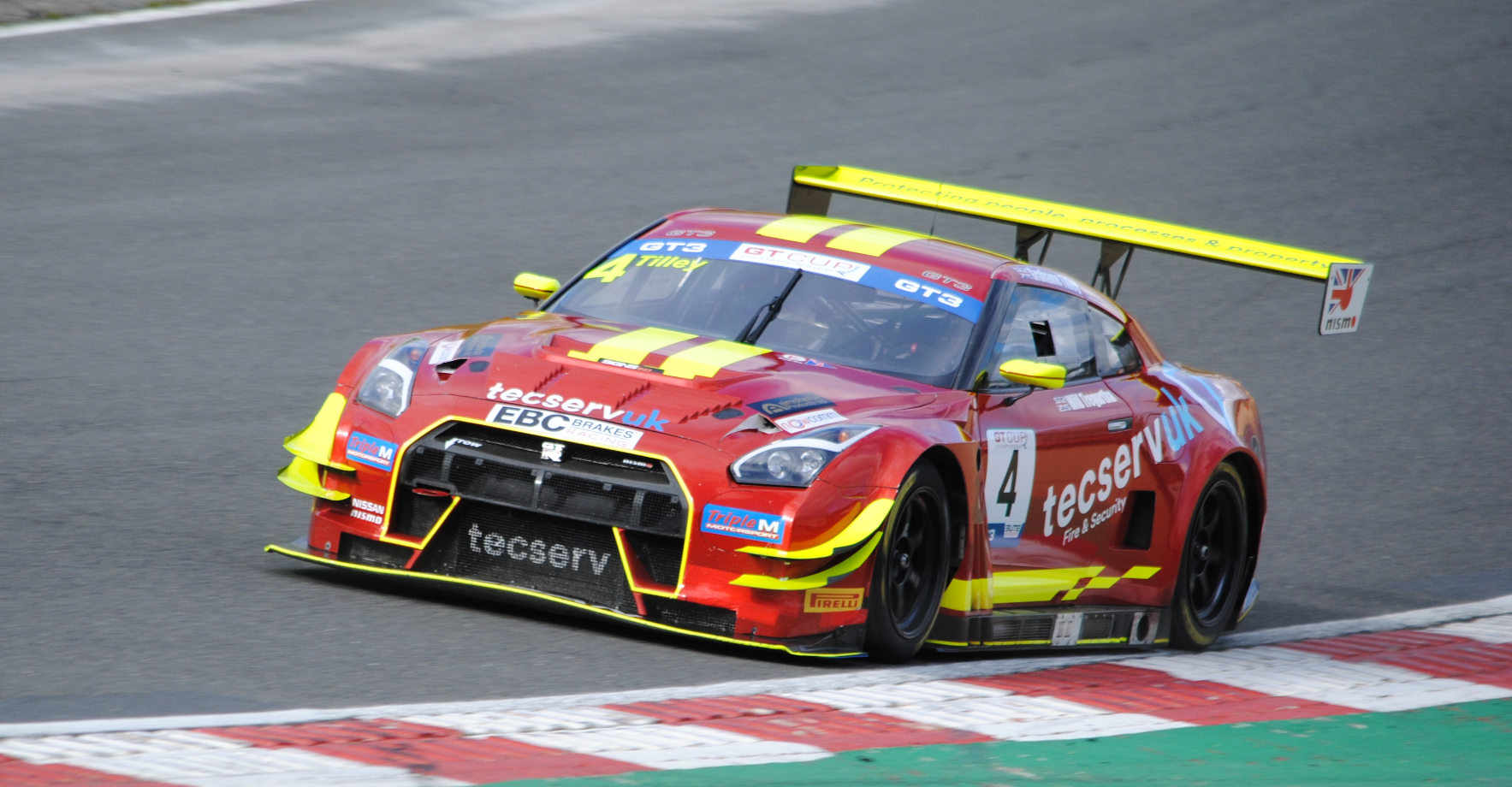
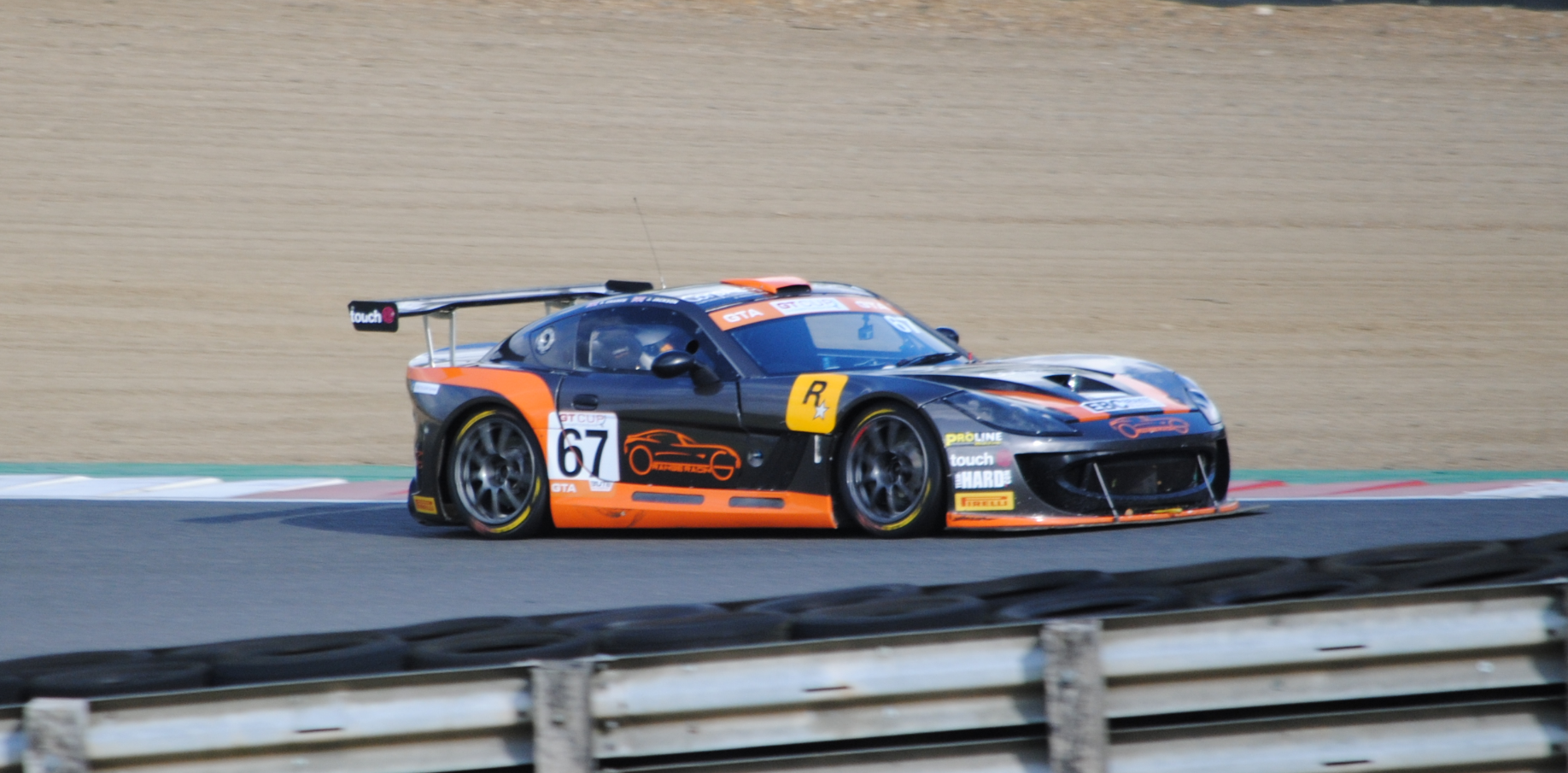
Solution-F TC 12 (left), an example of a GTO class car. A Nissan GT-R Nismo GT3 (middle), a GT3 class car. A Ginetta G55 Supercup (right), an example of a GTA class car.
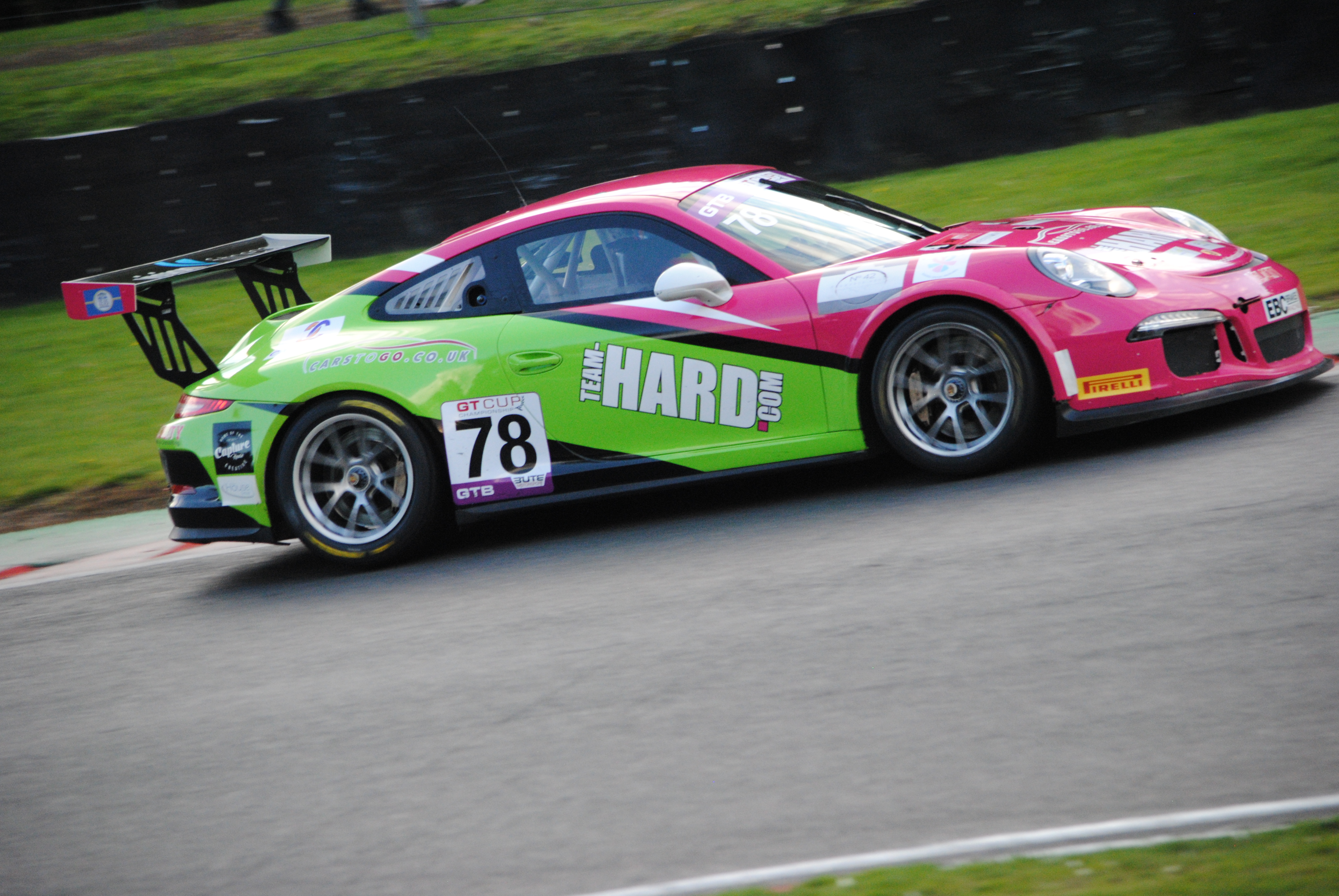
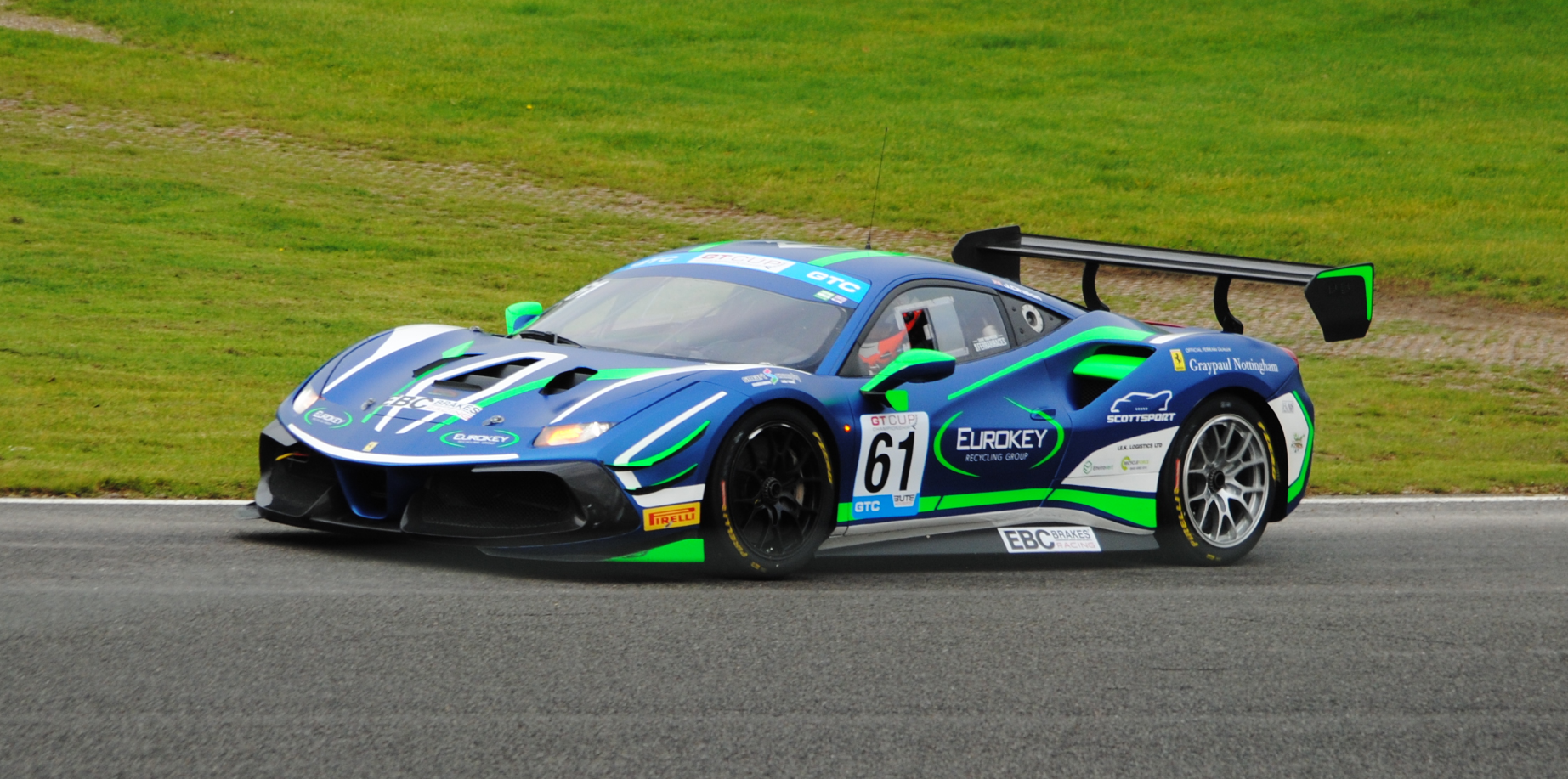
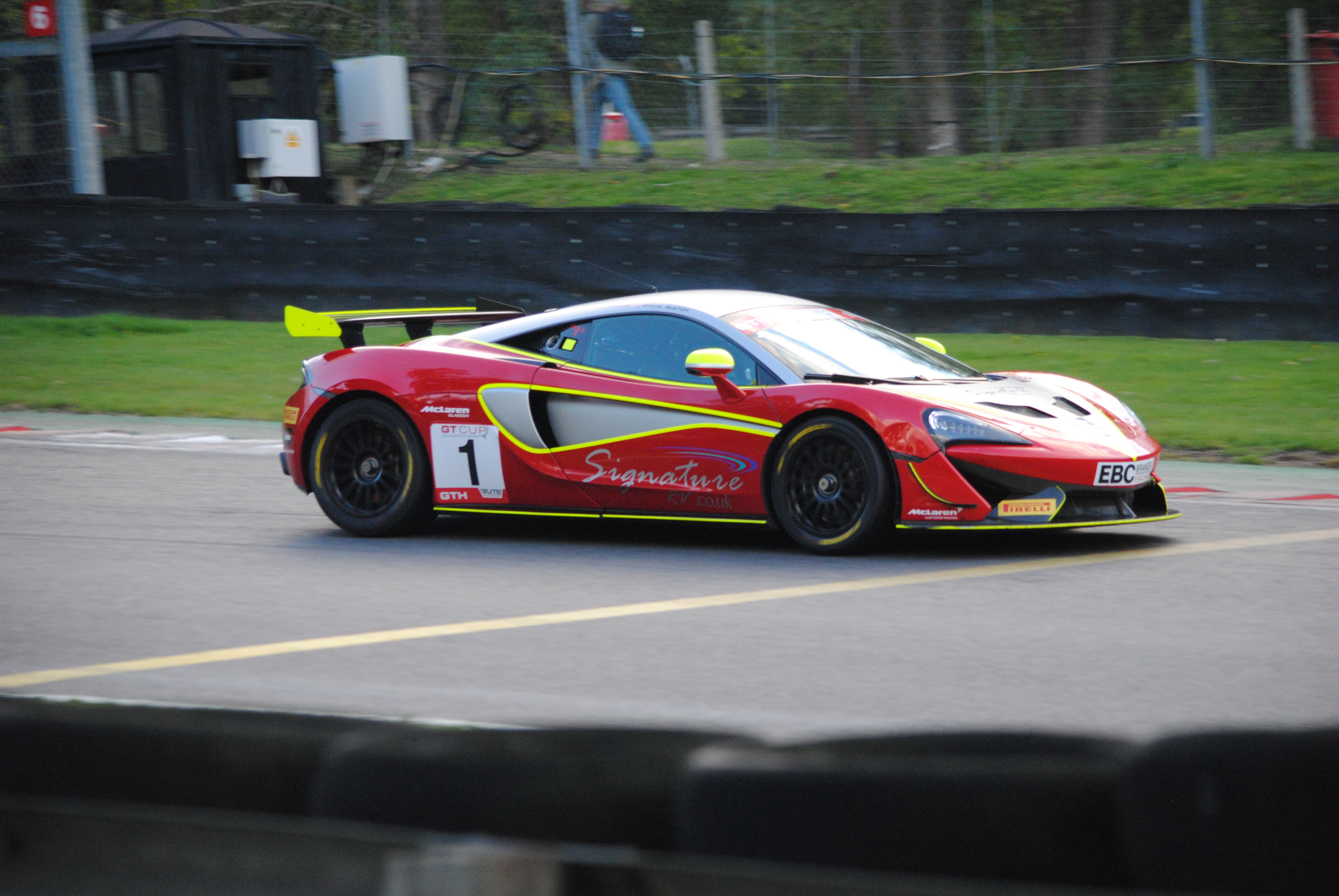
A Porsche 991 GT3 Cup (left), an example of a GTB class car. A Ferrari 488 Challenge Evo (middle), an example of a GTC class car. A McLaren 570S GT4 (right), an example of a GTH class car.

As of the 2022 season, GT Cup has six different classes:

- GTO: GT2, GTE, modified cars; silhouettes, replicas.
- GT3: Homologated cars running to Group GT3 specifications.
- GTA: Lower specification, cup challenge and one-make series cars.
- GTB: Early year challenge and cup cars
- GTC: Later year challenge and cup cars.
- GTH: Homologated cars running to Group GT4 specifications.

== Champions ==
| Year | Champion | Car | Team | Teams' Champion |
|---|---|---|---|---|
| 2010 | (United Kingdom) Marco Pullen | Ferrari 360 GTC | Team OMG | Not awarded |
| 2011 | (United Kingdom) Andy Ruhan | Porsche 997 GT3 Cup | JMH Automotive | Not awarded |
| 2012 | (United Kingdom) Derek Johnston | Ferrari 458 Challenge | Greypaul Racing | Not awarded |
| 2013 | (United Kingdom) Jeff Wyatt | BMW M3 GTR | Geoff Steel Racing | FF Corse |
| 2014 | (United Kingdom) Jim Geddie | McLaren MP4-12C GT3 | United Autosports | In2 Racing |
| 2015 | (United Kingdom) Charlie Hollings (United Kingdom) Wayne Marrs | Ferrari 458 Challenge | FF Corse | FF Corse |
| 2016 | (United Kingdom) Jordan Witt | Bentley Continental GT3 | Jordan Racing | JMH Automotive |
| 2017 | (United Kingdom) Graham Davidson | McLaren MP4-12C GT3 | Jetstream Motorsport | Spy Motorsport |
| 2018 | (United Kingdom) Adam Hatfield (United Kingdom) Chris Murphy | Aston Martin V8 Vantage GT4 | Whitebridge Motorsport | Topcats Racing |
| 2019 | (United Kingdom) Steve Ruston (United Kingdom) John Whitehouse | McLaren 570S GT4 | JMH Automotive | JMH Automotive |
| 2020 | (United Kingdom) Joshua Jackson (United Kingdom) Simon Orange | Ginetta G55 Supercup | Team HARD. Racing | Team HARD. Racing |
| 2021 | (United Kingdom) Richard Neary (United Kingdom) Sam Neary | Mercedes-AMG GT3 | Abba Racing | Orange Racing powered by JMH |
| 2022 | (United Kingdom) Michael O'Brien (United Kingdom) Simon Orange | McLaren 720S GT3 | Orange Racing powered by JMH | Orange Racing powered by JMH |
| 2023 | (United Kingdom) Paul Bailey (United Kingdom) James Dorlin (United Kingdom) Ross Wylie | Brabham BT62 Competition; Mercedes-AMG GT3; Lamborghini Huracán GT3 Evo | Kendall Developments | Orange Racing powered by JMH |
| 2024 | (United Kingdom) Charlotte Gilbert (United Kingdom) Tom Rawlings | Lamborghini Huracán Super Trofeo Evo | Topcats Racing | Topcats Racing |
| 2025 | (United Kingdom) Fraser Fenwick (United Kingdom) Charlotte Gilbert | Lamborghini Huracán Super Trofeo Evo | Topcats Racing | Topcats Racing |
| 2026 | (United Kingdom) Felix Livesey (United Kingdom) Charlie Digby | Lamborghini Huracán Super Trofeo Evo | Triple M Motorsport | Triple M Motorsport |
