= 2022 Porsche Carrera Cup Great Britain =

The 2022 Porsche Carrera Cup Great Britain was the 20th season of the multi-event, one-make motor racing championship held across England and Scotland. The championship features a mix of professional motor racing teams and privately funded drivers. It forms part of the extensive program of support categories built up around the BTCC centrepiece.

== Rule changes ==
=== Technical ===
- The outgoing Porsche 911 GT3 Cup (Type 991 II) car fleet was replaced by the latest generation of Porsche 911 GT3 Cup (Type 992) for all Porsche Supercup entrants from 2022 season onwards.

== Teams and drivers ==
The following teams and drivers are currently signed to run the 2022 season.

Team	No.	Driver	R	Rounds
Pro Class
Duckhams Yuasa Racing	2	(United Kingdom) Oliver White		All
Duckhams Yuasa Racing	21	(United Kingdom) Adam Smalley		All
Redline Racing	5	(Monaco) Micah Stanley		All
Redline Racing	16	(United Kingdom) Matthew Graham		1–6
Comline Richardson Racing	10	(United Kingdom) Will Martin		All
Comline Richardson Racing	89	(United Kingdom) Jack Bartholomew	R	1–3, 7–8
Comline Richardson Racing	90	(United Kingdom) Josh Malin		4–6
Team Parker Racing	26	(United Kingdom) Kiern Jewiss		All
Team Parker Racing	30	(United Kingdom) Seb Morris		1–3
Team Parker Racing	41	(United Kingdom) Jake Giddings		5–8
Team Parker Racing	87	(United Kingdom) Scott Malvern		6
Toro Verde GT	41	(United Kingdom) Jake Giddings		1–4
Toro Verde GT	59	(United Kingdom) Ross Wylie		3–4, 7–8
JTR	54	(United Kingdom) Theo Edgerton	R	All
Century Motorsport	57	(United Kingdom) Gus Burton	R	All
Pro-Am Class
JTR	8	(United Kingdom) Hugo Ellis	R	All
Team Parker Racing	9	(United Kingdom) Will Aspin	R	All
Team Parker Racing	33	(United Kingdom) Ryan Ratcliffe		All
Team Parker Racing	36	(Republic of Ireland) Karl Leonard		7
Team Parker Racing	77	(United Kingdom) Charles Bateman		1–5, 7–8
Redline Racing	27	(United Kingdom) Nathan Harrison		All
Toro Verde GT	52	(United Kingdom) Angus Whiteside		All
CCK Motorsport	99	(United Kingdom) Charles Rainford		All
Am Class
Toro Verde GT	6	(United Kingdom) Ian Loggie		5
Toro Verde GT	22	(United Kingdom) Peter Kyle-Henney		1–4
Toro Verde GT	44	(United Kingdom) Peter Mangion		1–2
Toro Verde GT	98	(United Kingdom) Lee Frost		7
Team Parker Racing	7	(United Kingdom) Justin Sherwood		1–3, 5
Team Parker Racing	14	(United Kingdom) Finley Cooper		7
Team Parker Racing	34	(United States) Dominique Bastien		4
Team Parker Racing	66	(United Kingdom) Nick Jones		6
Redline Racing	15	(United Kingdom) Nigel Rice		All
Valuga Racing	25	(United Kingdom) Mark Radcliffe		1–4, 8
Valuga Racing	31	(United Kingdom) Michael Clark		1, 3
JTR	95	(United Kingdom) Josh Stanton		All

== Race calendar ==
Round		Circuit	Date
1	R1	Donington Park (National Circuit, Leicestershire)	23–24 April
1	R2	Donington Park (National Circuit, Leicestershire)	23–24 April
2	R3	Brands Hatch (Indy Circuit, Kent)	14–15 May
2	R4	Brands Hatch (Indy Circuit, Kent)	14–15 May
3	R5	Oulton Park (Little Budworth)	11–12 June
3	R6	Oulton Park (Little Budworth)	11–12 June
4	R7	Knockhill Racing Circuit (Fife)	30–31 July
4	R8	Knockhill Racing Circuit (Fife)	30–31 July
5	R9	Snetterton Motor Racing Circuit (300 Circuit, Norfolk)	13–14 August
5	R10	Snetterton Motor Racing Circuit (300 Circuit, Norfolk)	13–14 August
6	R11	Thruxton Circuit (Hampshire)	27–28 August
6	R12	Thruxton Circuit (Hampshire)	27–28 August
7	R13	Silverstone Circuit (National Circuit, Northamptonshire)	24–25 September
7	R14	Silverstone Circuit (National Circuit, Northamptonshire)	24–25 September
8	R15	Brands Hatch (Grand Prix Circuit, Kent)	8–9 October
8	R16	Brands Hatch (Grand Prix Circuit, Kent)	8–9 October

== Championship standings ==
Points system
	1st	2nd	3rd	4th	5th	6th	7th	8th	PP	FL
Race 1 (Pro)	12	10	8	6	4	3	2	1	2	1
Race 2 (All Classes)	10	8	6	5	4	3	2	1	0	1

=== Drivers' championships ===
Pos	Driver	DON		BHI		OUL		KNO		SNE		THR		SIL		BHGP		Pts
Pro Class
1	(United Kingdom) Kiern Jewiss	14	3	2	1	3	3	2	4	1	4	5	5	1	1	1	2	141
2	(United Kingdom) Adam Smalley	1	4	8	3	2	4	4	2	7	7	3	2	3	7	3	3	103
3	(United Kingdom) Will Martin	11	7	1	2	1	5	3	1	6	6	2	3	5	11	Ret	6	97
4	(United Kingdom) Gustav Burton	4	Ret	4	6	Ret	DNS	1	5	2	5	1	4	4	2	2	8	87
5	(United Kingdom) Theo Edgerton	2	2	6	4	7	6	6	6	3	2	4	1	2	3	DSQ	7	69
6	(United Kingdom) Matthew Graham	3	1	9	5	5	1	Ret	DNS	5	1	7	6					62
7	(United Kingdom) Jake Giddings	10	10	Ret	10	8	8	10	10	9	14	9	12	8	6	6	4	26
8	(United Kingdom) Josh Malin							5	3	4	3	Ret	9					23
9	(United Kingdom) Jack Bartholomew	8	11	3	8	13	16							9	13	8	Ret	17
10	(United Kingdom) Oliver White	Ret	12	13	11	Ret	22	8	7	8	8	8	8	13	Ret	10	5	15
11	(Monaco) Micah Stanley	7	Ret	7	13	DSQ	DNS	9	9	15	10	13	13	12	10	5	Ret	9
12	(United Kingdom) Seb Morris	5	6	12	9	Ret	Ret											9
13	(United Kingdom) Ross Wylie					6	7	11	11					14	15	WD	WD	7
14	(United Kingdom) Scott Malvern											10	10					0
Pro-Am Class
1	(United Kingdom) Charles Rainford	DSQ	16	10	7	4	2	7	8	10	11	6	7	6	4	4	1	156
2	(United Kingdom) Nathan Harrison	6	5	14	16	12	13	12	12	11	9	11	11	15	14	7	10	111
3	(United Kingdom) Angus Whiteside	16	14	16	17	14	12	13	13	12	13	16	16	17	16	9	9	67
4	(United Kingdom) Ryan Ratcliffe	15	9	11	12	9	9	Ret	DNS	14	15	14	Ret	11	12	Ret	DNS	64
5	(United Kingdom) Hugo Ellis	12	13	21	14	11	11	Ret	DNS	16	16	Ret	15	7	5	Ret	DNS	64
6	(United Kingdom) Will Aspin	9	8	5	Ret	10	10	Ret	15	Ret	Ret	12	Ret	16	9	Ret	12	60
7	(United Kingdom) Charles Bateman	13	15	15	15	16	14	15	14	13	12			19	18	Ret	11	51
	(Republic of Ireland) Karl Leonard*													18	17	14	13	
Am Class
1	(United Kingdom) Josh Stanton	17	17	17	18	15	15	14	16	17	18	15	14	10	8	13	Ret	170
2	(United Kingdom) Nigel Rice	20	20	Ret	21	19	19	16	18	Ret	DNS	WD	WD	21	20	12	15	71
3	(United Kingdom) Justin Sherwood	18	18	18	20	18	18			18	17							61
4	(United Kingdom) Mark Radcliffe	19	23	20	19	17	17	Ret	DNS							11	14	60
5	(United Kingdom) Peter Kyle-Henney	21	22	19	22	Ret	21	17	17									34
6	(United Kingdom) Peter Mangion	22	19	Ret	23													12
7	(United Kingdom) Michael Clark	23	21			Ret	20											12
8	(United Kingdom) Nick Jones											17	Ret					8
	(United States) Dominique Bastien*							18	19									
	(United Kingdom) Ian Loggie*									19	19							
	(United Kingdom) Lee Frost*													20	19			
	(United Kingdom) Finlay Cooper*													22	21			

* Guest entry - ineligible for points
