= 2021 GT Cup Championship =

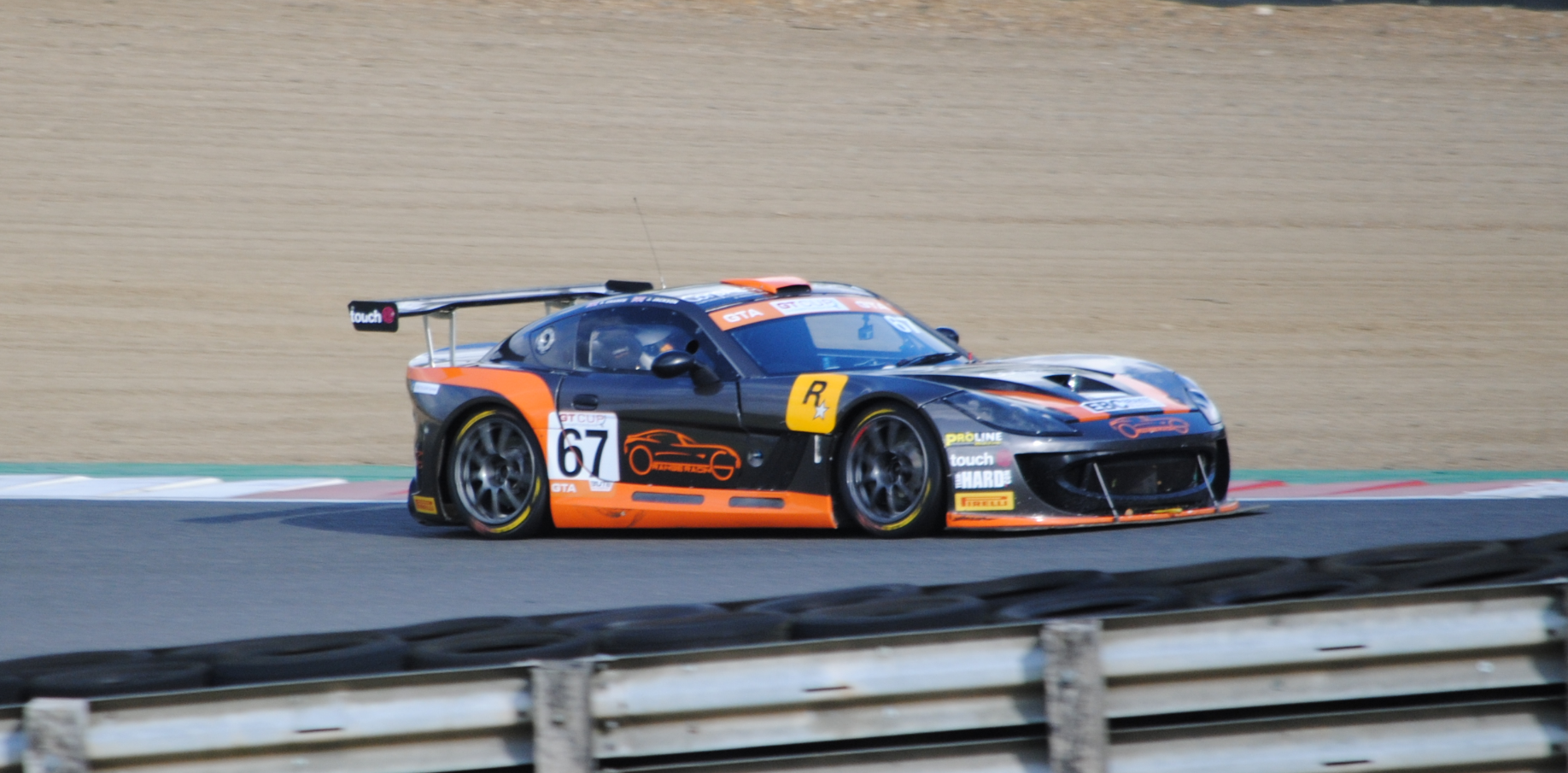
Reigning Group GTA and overall champions, Joshua Jackson and Simon Orange.

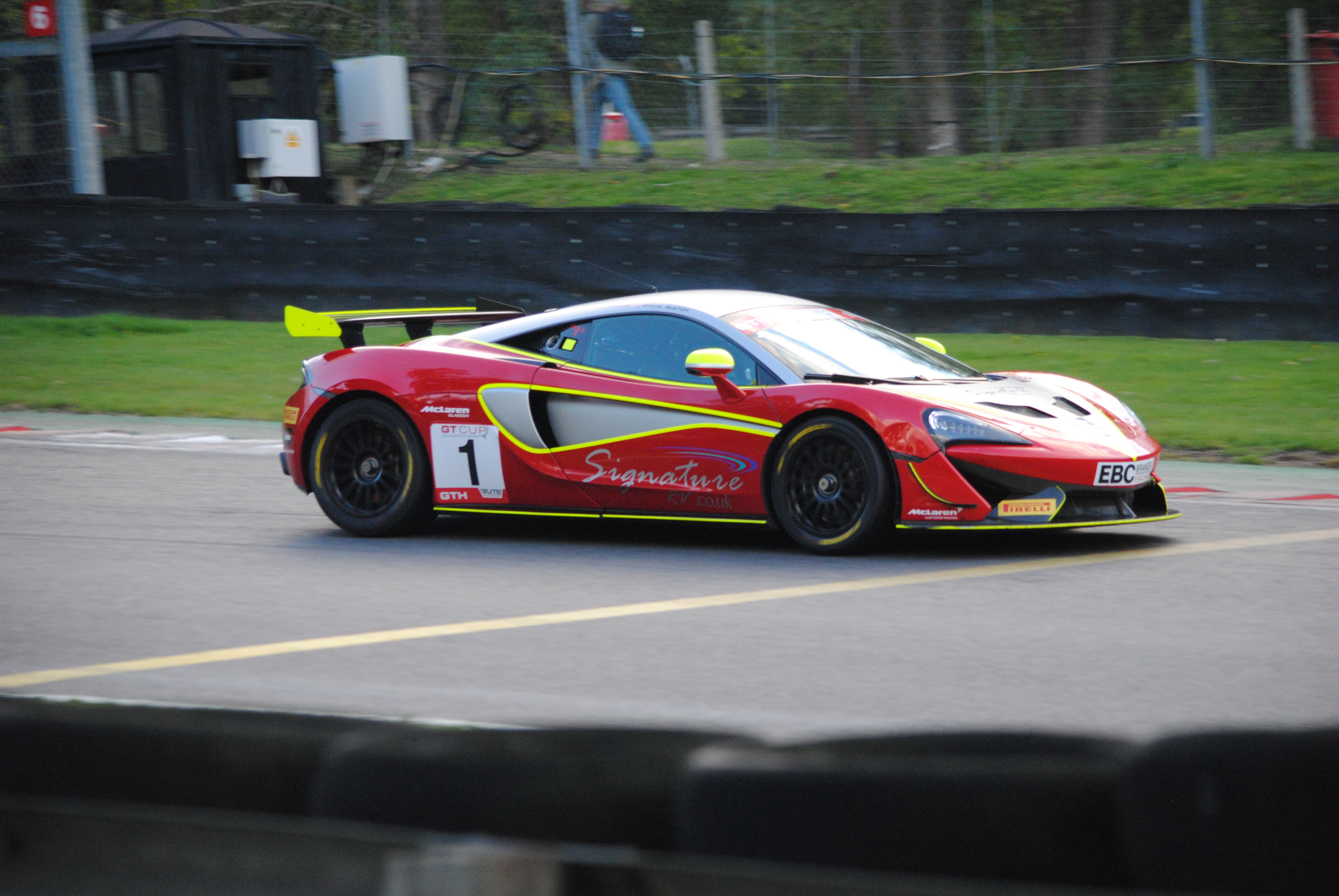
Reigning Group GTH champions, Steve Ruston and John Whitehouse.

The 2021 GT Cup Championship was the 15th GT Cup Championship, a British sports car championship. The season began on April 10th at Donington Park and end on 3 October at Snetterton Circuit, after twenty-six races held over seven meetings.

== Calendar ==
The calendar was announced on 14 October 2020. The championship will support the 2021 GT World Challenge Europe Sprint Cup at Brands Hatch. The Brands Hatch round has been postponed and will be rescheduled. It was later announced that the Brands Hatch event would be held over the course of 1 May, with only 2 50-minute races taking place.

Round	Circuit	Length	Date
1	Donington Park National, Leicestershire	25 min	10–11 April
2	Donington Park National, Leicestershire	50 min	10–11 April
3	Donington Park National, Leicestershire	25 min	10–11 April
4	Donington Park National, Leicestershire	50 min	10–11 April
5	Brands Hatch GP, Kent	50 min	1 May
6	Brands Hatch GP, Kent	50 min	1 May
7	Snetterton Circuit, Norfolk	25 min	5–6 June
8	Snetterton Circuit, Norfolk	50 min	5–6 June
9	Snetterton Circuit, Norfolk	25 min	5–6 June
10	Snetterton Circuit, Norfolk	50 min	5–6 June
11	Oulton Park, Cheshire	25 min	3 July
12	Oulton Park, Cheshire	50 min	3 July
13	Oulton Park, Cheshire	25 min	3 July
14	Oulton Park, Cheshire	50 min	3 July
15	Silverstone GP, Northamptonshire	25 min	14–15 August
16	Silverstone GP, Northamptonshire	50 min	14–15 August
17	Silverstone GP, Northamptonshire	25 min	14–15 August
18	Silverstone GP, Northamptonshire	50 min	14–15 August
19	Donington Park GP, Leicestershire	25 min	18–19 September
20	Donington Park GP, Leicestershire	50 min	18–19 September
21	Donington Park GP, Leicestershire	25 min	18–19 September
22	Donington Park GP, Leicestershire	50 min	18–19 September
23	Snetterton Circuit, Norfolk	25 min	2–3 October
24	Snetterton Circuit, Norfolk	50 min	2–3 October
25	Snetterton Circuit, Norfolk	25 min	2–3 October
26	Snetterton Circuit, Norfolk	50 min	2–3 October

== Teams and drivers ==
Classes:
Group GTO: Open specification (GT2, GTE, modified) cars
Group GT3: Homologated GT3 cars
Group GTA: Lower spec, challenge cars
Group GTB: Early year challenge and cup cars
Group GTC: Later year challenge and cup cars
Group GTH: Homologated GT4 cars

Team	Car	Engine	No.	Drivers	Class	Rounds
Orange Racing powered by JMH (Note: Cars no. 1, 17 and 67 are entered as Orange Racing powered by JMH and car no. 55 is entered as JMH Automotive.); JMH Automotive	McLaren 570S GT4	McLaren 3.8 L Turbo V8	1	(United Kingdom) Joshua Jackson	GTH	1–14
Orange Racing powered by JMH; JMH Automotive	McLaren 570S GT4	McLaren 3.8 L Turbo V8	1	(United Kingdom) Simon Orange	GTH	1–14
Orange Racing powered by JMH; JMH Automotive	Ginetta G55 Supercup	Ford Cyclone 3.7 L V6	17	(United Kingdom) Patrick Collins	GTA	1–14
Orange Racing powered by JMH; JMH Automotive	Ginetta G55 Supercup	Ford Cyclone 3.7 L V6	17	(United Kingdom) Russell Lindsay	GTA	1–14
Orange Racing powered by JMH; JMH Automotive	Ginetta G55 Supercup	Ford Cyclone 3.7 L V6	67	(United Kingdom) Joshua Jackson	GTA	1–14
Orange Racing powered by JMH; JMH Automotive	Ginetta G55 Supercup	Ford Cyclone 3.7 L V6	67	(United Kingdom) Simon Orange	GTA	1–14
Orange Racing powered by JMH; JMH Automotive	Lamborghini Huracán GT3 Evo	Lamborghini 5.2 L V10	55	(United Kingdom) John Seale	GTO	1–10
Orange Racing powered by JMH; JMH Automotive	Lamborghini Huracán GT3 Evo	Lamborghini 5.2 L V10	55	(United Kingdom) Abbie Eaton	GTO	1–6
Orange Racing powered by JMH; JMH Automotive	Lamborghini Huracán GT3 Evo	Lamborghini 5.2 L V10	55	(United Kingdom) Jamie Stanley	GTO	7–10
Topcats Racing	Marcos Mantis	Chevrolet 5.7 L LS1 V8	3	(United Kingdom) Charlotte Gilbert	GTB	1–14
Topcats Racing	Marcos Mantis	Chevrolet 5.7 L LS1 V8	3	(United Kingdom) Steve Glynn	GTB	7–10
Topcats Racing	Marcos Mantis	Chevrolet 5.7 L LS1 V8	3	(United Kingdom) Jon Harrison	GTB	11–14
Topcats Racing	Lamborghini Huracán Super Trofeo Evo	Lamborghini 5.2 L V10	9	(United Kingdom) Warren Gilbert	GTC	1–14
Topcats Racing	Lamborghini Huracán Super Trofeo Evo	Lamborghini 5.2 L V10	9	(United Kingdom) Jensen Lunn	GTC	1–14
Tecserv UK	Nissan GT-R Nismo GT3	Nissan VR38DETT 3.8 L Turbo V6	4	(United Kingdom) Grahame Tilley	GT3	1–14
Tecserv UK	Nissan GT-R Nismo GT3	Nissan VR38DETT 3.8 L Turbo V6	4	(United Kingdom) Will Tregurtha	GT3	1–4, 7–10
Tecserv UK	Nissan GT-R Nismo GT3	Nissan VR38DETT 3.8 L Turbo V6	4	(United Kingdom) Sennan Fielding	GT3	5–6, 11–14
CTR Developments	Porsche 935	Porsche 3.3 L Flat-6	5	(United Kingdom) Richard Chamberlain	GTO	1–10
Century Motorsport	Ginetta G55 Supercup	Ford Cyclone 3.7 L V6	6	(United Kingdom) James Kellett	GTA	1–14
Century Motorsport	Ginetta G55 Supercup	Ford Cyclone 3.7 L V6	6	(United Kingdom) Alex Stevenson	GTA	1–14
Century Motorsport	Ginetta G55 Supercup	Ford Cyclone 3.7 L V6	106	(United Kingdom) Henry Dawes	GTA	5–6
Century Motorsport	Aston Martin Vantage AMR GT4	Aston Martin 4.0 L Turbo V8	15	(United Kingdom) Adam Hatfield	GTH	1–14
Century Motorsport	Aston Martin Vantage AMR GT4	Aston Martin 4.0 L Turbo V8	15	(United Kingdom) David Holloway	GTH	1–14
RAW Motorsport	Radical RXC GT3	Ford EcoBoost 3.5 L V6	7	(United Kingdom) Steve Burgess	GTO	1–14
RAW Motorsport	Radical RXC GT3	Ford EcoBoost 3.5 L V6	7	(United Kingdom) Ben Dimmack	GTO	1–14
Team ABBA Racing	Mercedes-AMG GT4	Mercedes-AMG M178 4.0 L V8	8	(United Kingdom) Jason Garrett	GTH	TBA
Team ABBA Racing	Mercedes-AMG GT4	Mercedes-AMG M178 4.0 L V8	8	(United Kingdom) Sam Neary	GTH	TBA
Team ABBA Racing	Mercedes-AMG GT3	Mercedes-AMG M159 6.2 L V8	88	(United Kingdom) Richard Neary	GT3	1–15
Team ABBA Racing	Mercedes-AMG GT3	Mercedes-AMG M159 6.2 L V8	88	(United Kingdom) Sam Neary	GT3	1–15
Team HARD. Racing	Ginetta G55 GT4	Ford Cyclone 3.7 L V6	10	(United Kingdom) Freddie Flintoff	GTH	7–8
Team HARD. Racing	Ginetta G55 GT4	Ford Cyclone 3.7 L V6	10	(United Kingdom) Chris Harris	GTH	7–8
Team HARD. Racing	Ginetta G55 GT4	Ford Cyclone 3.7 L V6	10	(United Kingdom) Sebastian Melrose	GTH	9–10
Team HARD. Racing	Porsche 991 GT3 Cup	Porsche 4.0 L Flat-6	34	(United Kingdom) Richard Marsh	GTB	1–14
Team HARD. Racing	Porsche 991 GT3 Cup	Porsche 4.0 L Flat-6	34	(United Kingdom) Sam Randon	GTB	1–14
Barwell Motorsport	Lamborghini Huracán GT3 Evo	Lamborghini 5.2 L V10	11	(United Kingdom) Adam Balon	GT3	5–6
Barwell Motorsport	Lamborghini Huracán GT3 Evo	Lamborghini 5.2 L V10	63	(Russia) Leo Machitski	GT3	5–6
Team Parker Racing	Porsche 718 Cayman GT4 Clubsport	Porsche 3.8 L Flat-6	16	(United Kingdom) Justin Armstrong	GTH	5–6
Team Parker Racing	Porsche 718 Cayman GT4 Clubsport	Porsche 3.8 L Flat-6	16	(United Kingdom) Mark Armstrong	GTH	5–6
Team Parker Racing	Porsche 911 GT3 R	Porsche 4.0 L Flat-6	60	(United Kingdom) Nick Jones	GT3	5–6
Team Parker Racing	Porsche 911 GT3 R	Porsche 4.0 L Flat-6	60	(United Kingdom) Scott Malvern	GT3	5–6
WPI Motorsport	Lamborghini Huracán GT3 Evo	Lamborghini 5.2 L V10	18	(United Kingdom) Michael Igoe	GT3	1–6, 11–14
WPI Motorsport	Lamborghini Huracán GT3 Evo	Lamborghini 5.2 L V10	18	(United Kingdom) Phil Keen	GT3	1–6, 11–14
Saxon Motorsport	BMW 150 GTR	BMW 5.0 L V10	20	(United Kingdom) Tom Barrow	GTB	11–14
Greystone GT	McLaren 570S GT4	McLaren 3.8 L Turbo V8	22	(United Kingdom) Richard Mason	GTH	1–4, 11–14
Greystone GT	McLaren 570S GT4	McLaren 3.8 L Turbo V8	22	(United Kingdom) Jon Lancaster	GTH	1–4
Greystone GT	McLaren 570S GT4	McLaren 3.8 L Turbo V8	22	(United Kingdom) Duncan Tappy	GTH	11–14
Greystone GT	McLaren 570S GT4	McLaren 3.8 L Turbo V8	23	(United Kingdom) Iain Campbell	GTH	1–14
Greystone GT	McLaren 570S GT4	McLaren 3.8 L Turbo V8	23	(United Kingdom) Oliver Webb	GTH	1–14
Greystone GT	McLaren 570S GT4	McLaren 3.8 L Turbo V8	77	(Republic of Ireland) Adam Carroll	GTH	1–14
Greystone GT	McLaren 570S GT4	McLaren 3.8 L Turbo V8	77	(United Kingdom) Mark Hopton	GTH	1–14
Paddock Motorsport (Note: Car no. 266 is entered as Paddock Motorsport and car no. 44 is entered as Signature RV/Paddock Motorsport.); Signature RV/Paddock Motorsport	McLaren 570S GT4	McLaren 3.8 L Turbo V8	26	(United Kingdom) Tom Rawlings	GTH	1–14
Paddock Motorsport; Signature RV/Paddock Motorsport	McLaren 570S GT4	McLaren 3.8 L Turbo V8	26	(United Kingdom) Moh Ritson	GTH	1–14
Paddock Motorsport; Signature RV/Paddock Motorsport	McLaren 570S GT4	McLaren 3.8 L Turbo V8	44	(United Kingdom) Steve Ruston	GTH	1–14
Paddock Motorsport; Signature RV/Paddock Motorsport	McLaren 570S GT4	McLaren 3.8 L Turbo V8	44	(United Kingdom) John Whitehouse	GTH	1–14
SB Race Engineering	Ferrari 488 Challenge	Ferrari 3.9 L Turbo V8	28	(United Kingdom) Paul Bailey	GTO	1–6
SB Race Engineering	Ferrari 488 Challenge	Ferrari 3.9 L Turbo V8	28	(United Kingdom) Ross Wylie	GTO	1–6
SB Race Engineering	Brabham BT62 Competition	Ford Modular 5.4 L V8	28	(United Kingdom) Paul Bailey	GTO	7–14
SB Race Engineering	Brabham BT62 Competition	Ford Modular 5.4 L V8	28	(United Kingdom) Ross Wylie	GTO	7–14
Gemini Motorsport	Marcos Mantis	Chevrolet 7.0 L LS7 V8	29	(United Kingdom) Andy Robey	GTB	1–10
ALP Racing	Saker RAPX	Subaru 2.0 L V8	30	(United Kingdom) David Brise	GTB	5–6
ALP Racing	Saker RAPX	Subaru 2.0 L V8	30	(United Kingdom) Alan Purbrick	GTB	5–6
G-Cat Racing	Porsche 911 GT3 R	Porsche 4.0 L Flat-6	33	(United Kingdom) Greg Caton	GT3	5–6
G-Cat Racing	Porsche 911 GT3 R	Porsche 4.0 L Flat-6	33	(United Kingdom) Shamus Jennings	GT3	5–6
Valluga Racing	Porsche 991 GT3 Cup	Porsche 4.0 L Flat-6	31	(United Kingdom) Michael Clark	GTC	11–14
Valluga Racing	Porsche 991 GT3 Cup	Porsche 4.0 L Flat-6	35	(United Kingdom) Nick Phelps	GTB	1–14
Valluga Racing	Porsche 991 GT3 Cup	Porsche 4.0 L Flat-6	35	(Republic of Ireland) Sean Doyle	GTB	9–10
Valluga Racing	Porsche 991 GT3 Cup	Porsche 4.0 L Flat-6	91	(United Kingdom) Benji Hetherington	GTB	7–10
Valluga Racing	Porsche 991 GT3 Cup	Porsche 4.0 L Flat-6	91	(United Kingdom) Ian Humphries	GTB	7–10
Valluga Racing	Porsche 718 Cayman GT4 Clubsport	Porsche 3.8 L Flat-6	50	(United Kingdom) Carl Cavers	GTH	1–14
Valluga Racing	Porsche 718 Cayman GT4 Clubsport	Porsche 3.8 L Flat-6	50	(United Kingdom) Lewis Plato	GTH	1–14
Valluga Racing	Porsche 718 Cayman GT4 Clubsport	Porsche 3.8 L Flat-6	91	(United Kingdom) Benji Hetherington	GTH	5–6
Valluga Racing	Porsche 718 Cayman GT4 Clubsport	Porsche 3.8 L Flat-6	91	(United Kingdom) Ian Humphries	GTH	5–6
Valluga Racing	Porsche 718 Cayman GT4 Clubsport	Porsche 3.8 L Flat-6	92	(United Kingdom) Charlie Hollings	GTH	7–10
Valluga Racing	Porsche 718 Cayman GT4 Clubsport	Porsche 3.8 L Flat-6	92	(United Kingdom) Charlie Myers	GTH	7–10
Balfe Motorsport	McLaren 720S GT3	McLaren M840T 4.0 L Turbo V8	36	(United Kingdom) Lewis Proctor	GT3	1–6
Balfe Motorsport	McLaren 720S GT3	McLaren M840T 4.0 L Turbo V8	36	(United Kingdom) Stewart Proctor	GT3	1–6
Balfe Motorsport	McLaren 570S GT4	McLaren 3.8 L Turbo V8	90	(United Kingdom) Callum MacLeod	GTH	1–14
Balfe Motorsport	McLaren 570S GT4	McLaren 3.8 L Turbo V8	90	(United Kingdom) Mike Price	GTH	1–14
Geoff Steel Racing	BMW Evolution	BMW 4.0 L V8	38	(United Kingdom) Sam Allpass	GTB	5–6
Stanbridge Motorsport	Lamborghini Huracán Super Trofeo Evo	Lamborghini 5.2 L V10	41	(United Kingdom) James Simons	GTC	1–14
Stanbridge Motorsport	Lamborghini Huracán Super Trofeo Evo	Lamborghini 5.2 L V10	41	(United Kingdom) Fraser Smart	GTC	1–10
Stanbridge Motorsport	Lamborghini Huracán Super Trofeo Evo	Lamborghini 5.2 L V10	41	(United Kingdom) Graham Wilson	GTC	1–10
Stanbridge Motorsport	Lamborghini Huracán Super Trofeo Evo	Lamborghini 5.2 L V10	41	(United Kingdom) Tim Morley	GTC	11–14
Stanbridge Motorsport	Lamborghini Huracán Super Trofeo Evo	Lamborghini 5.2 L V10	96	(United Kingdom) Stuart Hall	GTC	1–10
Stanbridge Motorsport	Lamborghini Huracán Super Trofeo Evo	Lamborghini 5.2 L V10	96	(United Kingdom) Chris Kemp	GTC	1–10
Ultimate Speed	Aston Martin Vantage AMR GT3	Aston Martin 4.0 L Turbo V8	47	(United Kingdom) Michael Brown	GT3	5–10
Ultimate Speed	Aston Martin Vantage AMR GT3	Aston Martin 4.0 L Turbo V8	47	(United Kingdom) Matt Manderson	GT3	5–10
Deranged Motorsport	Aston Martin V8 Vantage GT4	Aston Martin 4.7 L V8	52	(United Kingdom) Matthew Lewis	GTB	1–6
Deranged Motorsport	Aston Martin V8 Vantage GT4	Aston Martin 4.7 L V8	52	(United Kingdom) Ben Barnwell	GTB	1, 5–6
Deranged Motorsport	Aston Martin V8 Vantage GT4	Aston Martin 4.7 L V8	52	(United Kingdom) Oli Brown	GTB	2–4
Deranged Motorsport	Bentley Continental GT3	Bentley 4.0 L Turbo V8	52	(United Kingdom) Ben Barnwell	GT3	TBA
Deranged Motorsport	Bentley Continental GT3	Bentley 4.0 L Turbo V8	52	(United Kingdom) Matthew Lewis	GT3	TBA
Vector Racing	Lotus Exige	Toyota 1.8 L I4	57	(United Kingdom) Peter Jackson	GTA	1–4, 11–14
Scott Sport	Lamborghini Huracán GT3 Evo	Lamborghini 5.2 L V10	61	(United Kingdom) John Dhillon	GT3	1–14
Scott Sport	Lamborghini Huracán GT3 Evo	Lamborghini 5.2 L V10	61	(United Kingdom) Phil Quaife	GT3	1–14
Scott Sport	Ginetta G55 Supercup	Ford Cyclone 3.7 L V6	80	(United Kingdom) Aaron Scott	GTA	1–14
Scott Sport	Ginetta G55 Supercup	Ford Cyclone 3.7 L V6	80	(United Kingdom) Craig Wilkins	GTA	1–14
Enduro Motorsport	Mercedes-AMG GT4	Mercedes-AMG M178 4.0 L V8	66	(United Kingdom) Marcus Clutton	GTH	1–14
Enduro Motorsport	Mercedes-AMG GT4	Mercedes-AMG M178 4.0 L V8	66	(United Kingdom) Morgan Tillbrook	GTH	1–14
Whitebridge Motorsport	Aston Martin V8 Vantage GT4	Aston Martin 4.7 L V8	72	(United Kingdom) Chris Murphy	GTB	1–4, 7–10
Whitebridge Motorsport	Aston Martin Vantage AMR GT4	Aston Martin 4.0 L Turbo V8	72	(United Kingdom) Chris Murphy	GTH	5–6
Whitebridge Motorsport	BMW M3 GTR	BMW 4.0 L V8	72	(United Kingdom) Chris Murphy	GTB	TBA
Feathers Motorsport	Aston Martin Vantage AMR GT4	Aston Martin 4.0 L Turbo V8	82	(United Kingdom) James Guess	GTH	1–14
Feathers Motorsport	Aston Martin Vantage AMR GT4	Aston Martin 4.0 L Turbo V8	82	(United Kingdom) Darren Turner	GTH	1–14
Fox Motorsport	Ginetta G55 Supercup	Ford Cyclone 3.7 L V6	118	(United Kingdom) Ian Duggan	GTA	1–14
Fox Motorsport	Ginetta G55 Supercup	Ford Cyclone 3.7 L V6	118	(United Kingdom) James Townsend	GTA	1–14
Makehappenracing	Ginetta G55 Supercup	Ford Cyclone 3.7 L V6	212	(United Kingdom) Chris Hart	GTA	1–14
Makehappenracing	Ginetta G55 Supercup	Ford Cyclone 3.7 L V6	212	(United Kingdom) Stephen Walton	GTA	1–14
Simon Green Motorsport	Lamborghini Huracán GT3 Evo	Lamborghini 5.2 L V10	247	(United Kingdom) Lucky Khera	GT3	1–10
Simon Green Motorsport	Ferrari 488 Challenge Evo	Ferrari 3.9 L Turbo V8	247	(United Kingdom) Lucky Khera	GTC	11–14
24/7 Motorsport	Porsche 991 GT3 Cup	Porsche 4.0 L Flat-6	911	(United Kingdom) David Frankland	GTB	1–10
24/7 Motorsport	Porsche 991 GT3 Cup	Porsche 4.0 L Flat-6	911	(United Kingdom) James Hillery	GTB	1–10

Icon	Group
GTO	GTO
GT3	GT3
GTA	GTA
GTB	GTB
GTC	GTC
GTH	GTH

== Results ==
Bold indicates overall winner.

Round		Circuit	Pole position	Fastest lap	Winning GTO	Winning GT3	Winning GTA	Winning GTB	Winning GTC	Winning GTH
1	R1	Donington Park National	No. 88 Team ABBA Racing	No. 88 Team ABBA Racing	No. 7 RAW Motorsport	**No. 88 Team ABBA Racing**	No. 80 Scott Sport	No. 3 Topcats Racing	No. 9 Topcats Racing	No. 52 Deranged Motorsport
1	R1	Donington Park National	(United Kingdom) Richard Neary (United Kingdom) Sam Neary	(United Kingdom) Richard Neary (United Kingdom) Sam Neary	(United Kingdom) Steve Burgess (United Kingdom) Ben Dimmack	**(United Kingdom) Richard Neary** **(United Kingdom) Sam Neary**	(United Kingdom) Aaron Scott (United Kingdom) Craig Wilkins	(United Kingdom) Charlotte Gilbert	(United Kingdom) Warren Gilbert (United Kingdom) Jensen Lunn	(United Kingdom) Ben Barnwell (United Kingdom) Matthew Lewis
1	R2	Donington Park National		No. 18 WPI Motorsport	No. 55 JMH Automotive	**No. 18 WPI Motorsport**	No. 67 Orange Racing powered by JMH	No. 34 Team HARD. Racing	No. 96 Stanbridge Motorsport	No. 1 Orange Racing powered by JMH
1	R2	Donington Park National		(United Kingdom) Michael Igoe (United Kingdom) Phil Keen	(United Kingdom) Abbie Eaton (United Kingdom) John Seale	**(United Kingdom) Michael Igoe** **(United Kingdom) Phil Keen**	(United Kingdom) Joshua Jackson (United Kingdom) Simon Orange	(United Kingdom) Richard Marsh (United Kingdom) Sam Randon	(United Kingdom) Stuart Hall (United Kingdom) Chris Kemp	(United Kingdom) Joshua Jackson (United Kingdom) Simon Orange
1	R3	Donington Park National	No. 88 Team ABBA Racing	No. 88 Team ABBA Racing	No. 5 CTR Developments	**No. 88 Team ABBA Racing**	No. 67 Orange Racing powered by JMH	No. 34 Team HARD. Racing	No. 9 Topcats Racing	No. 82 Feathers Motorsport
1	R3	Donington Park National	(United Kingdom) Richard Neary (United Kingdom) Sam Neary	(United Kingdom) Richard Neary (United Kingdom) Sam Neary	(United Kingdom) Richard Chamberlain	**(United Kingdom) Richard Neary** **(United Kingdom) Sam Neary**	(United Kingdom) Joshua Jackson (United Kingdom) Simon Orange	(United Kingdom) Richard Marsh (United Kingdom) Sam Randon	(United Kingdom) Warren Gilbert (United Kingdom) Jensen Lunn	(United Kingdom) James Guess (United Kingdom) Darren Turner
1	R4	Donington Park National		No. 88 Team ABBA Racing	No. 7 RAW Motorsport	**No. 88 Team ABBA Racing**	No. 67 Orange Racing powered by JMH	No. 34 Team HARD. Racing	No. 9 Topcats Racing	No. 82 Feathers Motorsport
1	R4	Donington Park National		(United Kingdom) Richard Neary (United Kingdom) Sam Neary	(United Kingdom) Steve Burgess (United Kingdom) Ben Dimmack	**(United Kingdom) Richard Neary** **(United Kingdom) Sam Neary**	(United Kingdom) Joshua Jackson (United Kingdom) Simon Orange	(United Kingdom) Richard Marsh (United Kingdom) Sam Randon	(United Kingdom) Warren Gilbert (United Kingdom) Jensen Lunn	(United Kingdom) James Guess (United Kingdom) Darren Turner
2	R5	Brands Hatch GP	No. 88 Team ABBA Racing	No. 88 Team ABBA Racing	No. 55 JMH Automotive	**No. 36 Balfe Motorsport**	No. 80 Scott Sport	No. 38 Geoff Steel Racing	No. 9 Topcats Racing	No. 1 Orange Racing powered by JMH
2	R5	Brands Hatch GP	(United Kingdom) Richard Neary (United Kingdom) Sam Neary	(United Kingdom) Richard Neary (United Kingdom) Sam Neary	(United Kingdom) Abbie Eaton (United Kingdom) John Seale	**(United Kingdom) Lewis Proctor** **(United Kingdom) Stuart Proctor**	(United Kingdom) Aaron Scott (United Kingdom) Craig Wilkins	(United Kingdom) Sam Allpass	(United Kingdom) Warren Gilbert (United Kingdom) Jensen Lunn	(United Kingdom) Joshua Jackson (United Kingdom) Simon Orange
2	R6	Brands Hatch GP		No. 88 Team ABBA Racing	No. 5 CTR Developments	**No. 88 Team ABBA Racing**	No. 106 Century Motorsport	No. 34 Team HARD. Racing	No. 96 Stanbridge Motorsport	No. 1 Orange Racing powered by JMH
2	R6	Brands Hatch GP		(United Kingdom) Richard Neary (United Kingdom) Sam Neary	(United Kingdom) Richard Chamberlain	**(United Kingdom) Richard Neary** **(United Kingdom) Sam Neary**	(United Kingdom) Henry Dawes	(United Kingdom) Richard Marsh (United Kingdom) Sam Randon	(United Kingdom) Stuart Hall (United Kingdom) Chris Kemp	(United Kingdom) Joshua Jackson (United Kingdom) Simon Orange
3	R7	Snetterton Circuit	No. 88 Team ABBA Racing	No. 88 Team ABBA Racing	No. 7 RAW Motorsport	**No. 88 Team ABBA Racing**	No. 212 Makehappenracing	No. 34 Team HARD. Racing	No. 9 Topcats Racing	No. 1 Orange Racing powered by JMH
3	R7	Snetterton Circuit	(United Kingdom) Richard Neary (United Kingdom) Sam Neary	(United Kingdom) Richard Neary (United Kingdom) Sam Neary	(United Kingdom) Steve Burgess (United Kingdom) Ben Dimmack	**(United Kingdom) Richard Neary** **(United Kingdom) Sam Neary**	(United Kingdom) Chris Hart (United Kingdom) Stephen Walton	(United Kingdom) Richard Marsh (United Kingdom) Sam Randon	(United Kingdom) Warren Gilbert (United Kingdom) Jensen Lunn	(United Kingdom) Joshua Jackson (United Kingdom) Simon Orange
3	R8	Snetterton Circuit		No. 28 SB Race Engineering	No. 28 SB Race Engineering	**No. 88 Team ABBA Racing**	No. 67 Orange Racing powered by JMH	No. 34 Team HARD. Racing	No. 9 Topcats Racing	No. 26 Paddock Motorsport
3	R8	Snetterton Circuit		(United Kingdom) Paul Bailey (United Kingdom) Ross Wylie	(United Kingdom) Paul Bailey (United Kingdom) Ross Wylie	**(United Kingdom) Richard Neary** **(United Kingdom) Sam Neary**	(United Kingdom) Joshua Jackson (United Kingdom) Simon Orange	(United Kingdom) Richard Marsh (United Kingdom) Sam Randon	(United Kingdom) Warren Gilbert (United Kingdom) Jensen Lunn	(United Kingdom) Tom Rawlings (United Kingdom) Moh Ritson
3	R9	Snetterton Circuit	No. 88 Team ABBA Racing	No. 88 Team ABBA Racing	No starters	**No. 88 Team ABBA Racing**	No. 6 Century Motorsport	No. 35 Valluga Racing	No. 9 Topcats Racing	No. 90 Balfe Motorsport
3	R9	Snetterton Circuit	(United Kingdom) Richard Neary (United Kingdom) Sam Neary	(United Kingdom) Richard Neary (United Kingdom) Sam Neary	No starters	**(United Kingdom) Richard Neary** **(United Kingdom) Sam Neary**	(United Kingdom) James Kellett (United Kingdom) Alex Stevenson	(Republic of Ireland) Sean Doyle (United Kingdom) Nick Phelps	(United Kingdom) Warren Gilbert (United Kingdom) Jensen Lunn	(United Kingdom) Callum MacLeod (United Kingdom) Mike Price
3	R10	Snetterton Circuit		No. 88 Team ABBA Racing	No finishers	**No. 88 Team ABBA Racing**	No. 67 Orange Racing powered by JMH	No. 35 Valluga Racing	No. 9 Topcats Racing	No. 90 Balfe Motorsport
3	R10	Snetterton Circuit		(United Kingdom) Richard Neary (United Kingdom) Sam Neary	No finishers	**(United Kingdom) Richard Neary** **(United Kingdom) Sam Neary**	(United Kingdom) Joshua Jackson (United Kingdom) Simon Orange	(Republic of Ireland) Sean Doyle (United Kingdom) Nick Phelps	(United Kingdom) Warren Gilbert (United Kingdom) Jensen Lunn	(United Kingdom) Callum MacLeod (United Kingdom) Mike Price
4	R11	Oulton Park	No. 88 Team ABBA Racing	No. 18 WPI Motorsport	No. 28 SB Race Engineering	**No. 18 WPI Motorsport**	No. 80 Scott Sport	No. 34 Team HARD. Racing	No. 247 Simon Green Motorsport	No. 90 Balfe Motorsport
4	R11	Oulton Park	(United Kingdom) Richard Neary (United Kingdom) Sam Neary	(United Kingdom) Michael Igoe (United Kingdom) Phil Keen	(United Kingdom) Paul Bailey (United Kingdom) Ross Wylie	**(United Kingdom) Michael Igoe** **(United Kingdom) Phil Keen**	(United Kingdom) Aaron Scott (United Kingdom) Craig Wilkins	(United Kingdom) Richard Marsh (United Kingdom) Sam Randon	(United Kingdom) Lucky Khera	(United Kingdom) Callum MacLeod (United Kingdom) Mike Price
4	R12	Oulton Park								
4	R13	Oulton Park								
4	R14	Oulton Park								
5	R15	Silverstone GP								
5	R16	Silverstone GP								
5	R17	Silverstone GP								
5	R18	Silverstone GP								
6	R19	Donington Park GP								
6	R20	Donington Park GP								
6	R21	Donington Park GP								
6	R22	Donington Park GP								
7	R23	Snetterton Circuit								
7	R24	Snetterton Circuit								
7	R25	Snetterton Circuit								
7	R26	Snetterton Circuit								

=== Overall championship standings ===
Points are awarded as follows:

System	1st	2nd	3rd	4th	5th	6th	7th	8th	9th	10th	PP	Fastest lap
3+	25	18	15	12	10	8	6	4	2	1	1	1
2	18	15	12	10	8	6	4	2	1		1	1
1	15	12	10	8	6	4	2	1			1	1

Pos.	Drivers	No.	Class	DON				BRH		SNE	OUL	SIL	DON	SNE	Pts
1	(United Kingdom) Warren Gilbert (United Kingdom) Jensen Lunn	9	GTC	8	11	6	8	9	21						141
2	(United Kingdom) Richard Neary (United Kingdom) Sam Neary	88	GT3	**1**	7	**1**	1	**10**	1						139
3	(United Kingdom) Richard Marsh (United Kingdom) Sam Randon	34	GTB	Ret	12	8	13	16	16						133
4	(United Kingdom) Joshua Jackson (United Kingdom) Simon Orange	67	GTA	13	14	11	10	15	18						132
5	(United Kingdom) Aaron Scott (United Kingdom) Craig Wilkins	80	GTA	11	8	12	18	14	17						127
6	(United Kingdom) Stuart Hall (United Kingdom) Chris Kemp	96	GTC	33	9	17	9	11	12						123
7	(United Kingdom) Joshua Jackson (United Kingdom) Simon Orange	1	GTH	12	13	14	24	18	23						111
8	(United Kingdom) Andy Robey	29	GTB	22	26	20	26	30	39						103
9	(United Kingdom) Abbie Eaton (United Kingdom) John Seale	55	GTO	23	3	23	DNS	7	10						103
10	(United Kingdom) James Guess (United Kingdom) Darren Turner	82	GTH	10	20	13	11	32	24						101
11	(United Kingdom) John Dhillon (United Kingdom) Phil Quaife	61	GT3	4	8	5	4	2	7						94
12	(United Kingdom) Grahame Tilley	4	GT3	3	4	3	3	3	Ret						94
12	(United Kingdom) Will Tregurtha	4	GT3	3	4	3	3								94
12	(United Kingdom) Sennan Fielding	4	GT3					3	Ret						94
13	(United Kingdom) Paul Bailey (United Kingdom) Ross Wylie	28	GTO	32	10	9	7	12	14						93
14	(United Kingdom) James Simons (United Kingdom) Fraser Smart (United Kingdom) Graham Wilson	41	GTC	33	31	7	19	34	22						93
15	(United Kingdom) Steve Burgess (United Kingdom) Ben Dimmack	7	GTO	7	5	16	6	Ret	11						93
16	(United Kingdom) Nick Phelps	35	GTB	20	32	10	Ret	20	19						85
17	(United Kingdom) James Kellett (United Kingdom) Alex Stevenson	6	GTA	31	25	31	15	24	28						82
18	(United Kingdom) Lucky Khera	247	GT3	6	6	2	DNS	35	6						78
19	(United Kingdom) Ian Duggan (United Kingdom) James Townsend	118	GTA	18	30	32	25	17	38						72
20	(United Kingdom) Chris Hart (United Kingdom) Stephen Walton	212	GTA	21	35	15	21	21	33						72
21	(United Kingdom) Richard Chamberlain	5	GTO	34	Ret	4	DNS	Ret	9						64
22	(United Kingdom) Callum MacLeod (United Kingdom) Mike Price	90	GTH	15	17	27	20	23	25						62
23	(United Kingdom) Charlotte Gilbert	3	GTB	19	36	Ret	Ret	38	36						60
24	(United Kingdom) Tom Rawlings (United Kingdom) Moh Ritson	26	GTH	17	16	18	DNS	25	31						59
25	(United Kingdom) Bradley Ellis (United Kingdom) David Holloway	15	GTH	25	18	24	14	29	26						55
26	(United Kingdom) Marcus Clutton (United Kingdom) Morgan Tilbrook	66	GTH	26	22	19	12	22	32						54
27	(United Kingdom) Chris Murphy	72	GTB	30	29	28	28								53
27	(United Kingdom) Chris Murphy	72	GTH					36	40						53
28	(United Kingdom) Carl Cavers (United Kingdom) Lewis Plato	50	GTH	14	19	21	30	19	41						50
29	(United Kingdom) James Hillery (United Kingdom) David Frankland	911	GTB	27	33	Ret	29	Ret	DNS						38
30	(United Kingdom) Iain Campbell (United Kingdom) Oliver Webb	23	GTH	24	21	26	17	31	30						36
31	(United Kingdom) Patrick Collins (United Kingdom) Russell Lindsay	17	GTA	29	34	Ret	31	26	Ret						36
32	(United Kingdom) Steve Ruston (United Kingdom) John Whitehouse	44	GTH	16	28	25	27	27	29						33
33	(United Kingdom) Jon Lancaster (United Kingdom) Rich Mason	22	GTH	28	23	30	16								14
34	(Republic of Ireland) Adam Carroll (United Kingdom) Mark Hopton	77	GTH	DSQ	27	29	22	33	35						6
Entries ineligible to score points
	(United Kingdom) Michael Igoe (United Kingdom) Phil Keen	18	GT3	2	1	Ret	2	Ret	3						
	(United Kingdom) Lewis Proctor (United Kingdom) Stewart Proctor	36	GT3	5	2	22	5	1	5						
	(United Kingdom) Adam Balon	11	GT3					4	2						
	(United Kingdom) Nick Jones (United Kingdom) Scott Malvern	60	GT3					6	4						
	(United Kingdom) Greg Caton (United Kingdom) Shamus Jennings	33	GT3					5	8						
	(United Kingdom) Mike Brown (United Kingdom) Matt Manderson	47	GT3					8	13						
	(United Kingdom) Matthew Lewis	52	GTH	8	24	Ret	DNS	DNS	DNS						
	(United Kingdom) Ben Barnwell	52	GTH	8				DNS	DNS						
	(United Kingdom) Oli Brown	52	GTH		24	Ret	DNS								
	(United Kingdom) Sam Allpass	38	GTB					13	20						
	(United Kingdom) Henry Dawes	106	GTA					39	15						
	(United Kingdom) David Brise (United Kingdom) Alan Purbrick	30	GTB					Ret	27						
	(United Kingdom) Benji Hetherington (United Kingdom) Ian Humphries	91	GTH					28	34						
	(United Kingdom) Justin Armstrong (United Kingdom) Mark Armstrong	16	GTH					37	37						
	(Russia) Leo Machitski	63	GT3					DSQ	DSQ						
	(United Kingdom) Peter Jackson	57	GTA	DNS	DNS	DNS	DNS								
Pos.	Drivers	No.	Class	DON				BRH		SNE	OUL	SIL	DON	SNE	Pts

Key
Colour	Result
Gold	Winner
Silver	Second place
Bronze	Third place
Green	Other points position
Blue	Other classified position
Blue	Not classified, finished (NC)
Purple	Not classified, retired (Ret)
Red	Did not qualify (DNQ)
Red	Did not pre-qualify (DNPQ)
Black	Disqualified (DSQ)
White	Did not start (DNS)
White	Race cancelled (C)
Blank	Did not practice (DNP)
Blank	Excluded (EX)
Blank	Did not arrive (DNA)
Blank	Withdrawn (WD)
Blank	Did not enter (cell empty)
Text formatting	Meaning
**Bold**	Pole position
Italics	Fastest lap

=== Class championship standings ===
Points are awarded as follows:

System	1st	2nd	3rd	4th	5th	6th	7th	8th	9th	10th	PP	Fastest lap
3+	25	18	15	12	10	8	6	4	2	1	1	1
2	18	15	12	10	8	6	4	2	1		1	1
1	15	12	10	8	6	4	2	1			1	1

Pos.	Drivers	No.	DON				BRH	SNE	OUL	SIL	DON	SNE	Pts
GTO
1	(United Kingdom) Steve Burgess (United Kingdom) Ben Dimmack	7	7	5	16	6							77
2	(United Kingdom) Paul Bailey (United Kingdom) Ross Wylie	28	32	10	9	7							63
3	(United Kingdom) Abbie Eaton (United Kingdom) John Seale	55	**23**	3	23	DNS							58
4	(United Kingdom) Richard Chamberlain	5	34	Ret	**4**	DNS							26
GT3
1	(United Kingdom) Grahame Tilley (United Kingdom) Will Tregurtha	4	3	4	3	3							69
2	(United Kingdom) John Dhillon (United Kingdom) Phil Quaife	61	4	8	5	4							57
3	(United Kingdom) Lucky Khera	247	6	6	2	DNS							38
Entries ineligible to score points
	(United Kingdom) Richard Neary (United Kingdom) Sam Neary	88	**1**	7	**1**	1							
	(United Kingdom) Michael Igoe (United Kingdom) Phil Keen	18	2	1	Ret	2							
	(United Kingdom) Lewis Proctor (United Kingdom) Stewart Proctor	36	5	2	22	5							
Pos.	Drivers	No.	DON				BRH	SNE	OUL	SIL	DON	SNE	Pts

Key
Colour	Result
Gold	Winner
Silver	Second place
Bronze	Third place
Green	Other points position
Blue	Other classified position
Blue	Not classified, finished (NC)
Purple	Not classified, retired (Ret)
Red	Did not qualify (DNQ)
Red	Did not pre-qualify (DNPQ)
Black	Disqualified (DSQ)
White	Did not start (DNS)
White	Race cancelled (C)
Blank	Did not practice (DNP)
Blank	Excluded (EX)
Blank	Did not arrive (DNA)
Blank	Withdrawn (WD)
Blank	Did not enter (cell empty)
Text formatting	Meaning
**Bold**	Pole position
Italics	Fastest lap
