= List of rally cars =

List of rally cars

== Early era ==
- BMW 328
- BMW 700
- Ford Cortina MK1
- Ford Falcon
- Ford Fairlane
- Ford Mustang
- Ford Starliner
- Jaguar MkII
- Jaguar XK120
- Jaguar E-Type
- Lancia Fulvia
- Mini Cooper
- Mini Cooper S
- Mitsubishi Lancer 1600 GSR
- NSU TT 1300
- Renault 8 Gordini
- Renault Dauphine
- Škoda MB 1100
- Škoda Octavia TS
- Mercedes-Benz W111
- Renault 4
- Triumph Vitesse
- Triumph TR4
- Porsche 356
- Saab Monte Carlo 850
- Volvo Amazon
- Volvo 140
- Volvo 164
- Volvo PV544
- Volvo P1800
- Alfa Romeo Giulia TI
- Alfa Romeo 2000 GTV
- Alfa Romeo 1750 GTV
- Hillman Imp
- Plymouth Valiant
- Opel Rekord
- Fiat 850 Sport Coupé
- Fiat 2300 S Coupé
- Ford Anglia
- Ford Escort RS1600
- Ford Escort RS2000
- Trabant P 50
- Volkswagen Beetle
- Volkswagen Type 3

== Group 2 (1966–1981) ==
- BMW 2002 Turbo
- BMW 2002Ti
- Dodge Ramcharger
- Dodge Charger Hemi
- FSO Polonez 2000 Rally
- Ford Capri 2300
- Mitsubishi Celeste/Plymouth Arrow
- Opel Commodore
- Porsche 911
- Trabant P 50
- Triumph 2000
- Volvo 142

== Group 3 ==
- Lancia Beta Coupe
- Porsche 914/6

== Group 4 (1973–1983) ==
- Alfa Romeo Alfetta GTV Turbodelta
- Alfa Romeo Alfasud TI
- Alpine-Renault A110
- Alpine-Renault A310
- Audi 50 GL
- Audi Quattro
- Autobianchi A112 Abarth
- Chevrolet Monza
- Citroën DS21
- Citroën DS23
- DAF 66
- Fiat 124 Abarth Rally
- Fiat 127 Sport
- Fiat 131 Abarth
- Fiat X1/9
- FSO Polonez 2000 Rally
- Ford Escort RS1600
- Ford Escort RS1800
- Ford Escort RS2000
- Ford Escort BDA
- Ferrari 308 GTB
- Sunbeam Avenger 1600 GT
- Lancia Stratos HF
- Mazda 1300
- Mazda RX-3
- Mercedes-Benz 450 SL
- Mitsubishi Lancer 2000 Turbo
- Datsun 240Z
- Datsun 100A
- Datsun 1800 SSS
- Datsun Stanza
- Opel Ascona 400
- Opel Kadett Rallye
- Opel Kadett GT/E
- Peugeot 104
- Peugeot 504
- Porsche 911
- Porsche 934 Turbo
- Polski Fiat 125p
- Renault 4 GTL
- Renault 17
- Saab 96 V4
- Saab 99 EMS
- SEAT 124-1800
- Simca Rallye 2
- Simca Rallye 3
- Skoda 120 LS
- Talbot Sunbeam Lotus
- Toyota Celica 2000GT RA40 & RA63
- Trabant 601
- Trabant P 50
- Triumph TR7
- Volkswagen Scirocco
- Volkswagen Golf GTi
- Volvo 142
- Volvo 240
- Wartburg 353

== Group B (1982–1986) ==
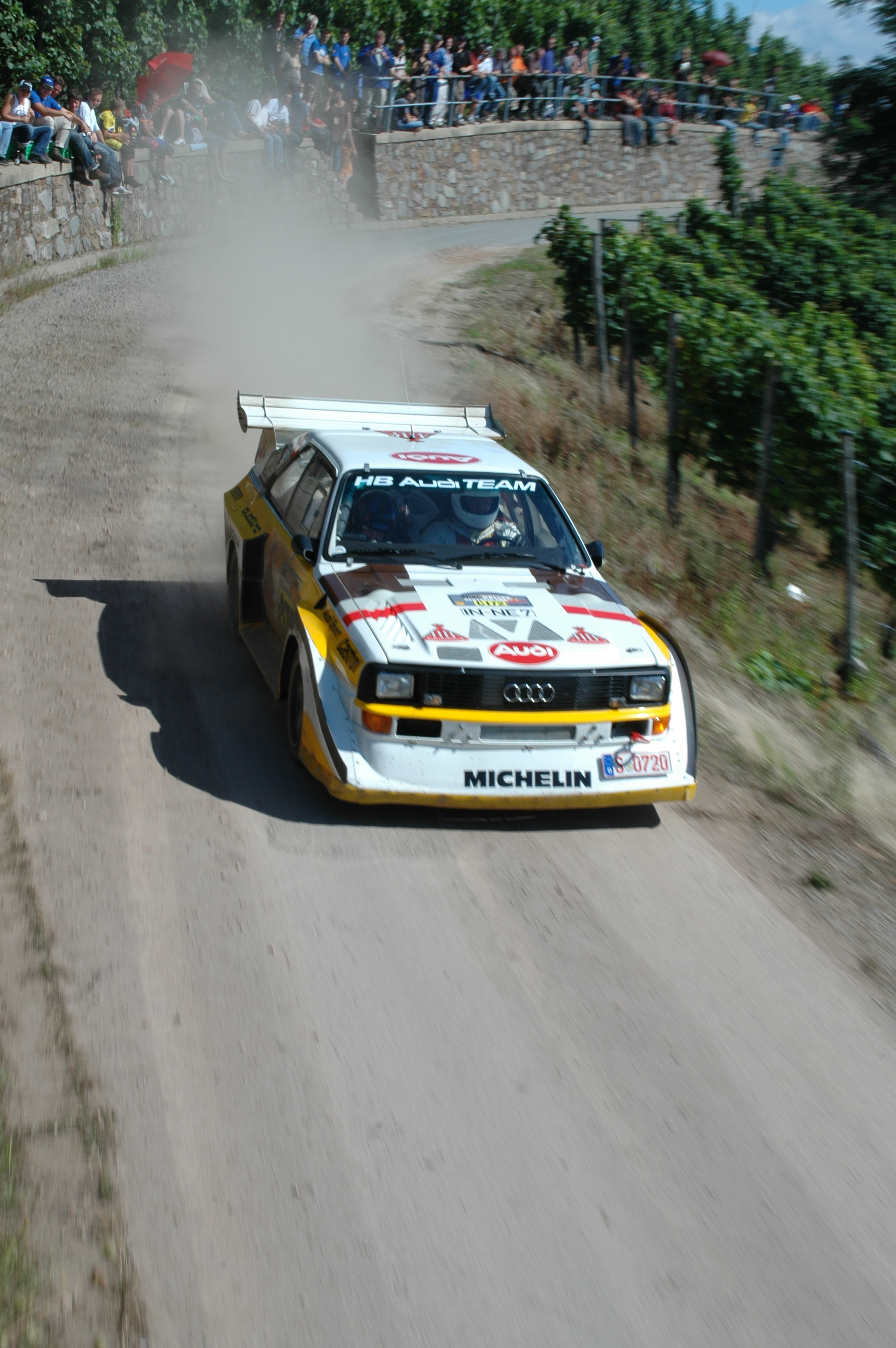
Audi Quattro S1, one of the most successful Group B cars.

- Alfa Romeo Alfasud Sprint 6C
- Audi Quattro A1
- Audi Quattro A2
- Audi Sport Quattro S1
- Audi Sport Quattro S1 E2
- BMW M1
- Citroën BX 4TC EVO
- Citroën Visa Chrono II
- Citroën Visa Mille Pistes
- Citroën Visa Trophée
- Daihatsu Charade 926 Turbo
- Daihatsu Charade DeTomaso 926R
- Ferrari 288 GTO
- Ferrari 288 GTO Evoluzione
- Ferrari 308 GTB Michelotto
- Ford Escort RS 1700T
- Ford RS200 E
- Ford RS200 E2
- FSO Polonez 2000
- Honda Ballade Sports car
- Lada Samara EVA
- Lada VFTS
- Lancia 037
- Lancia Delta S4
- Mazda RX-7 FB
- Mercedes 190E Cosworth
- MG Metro 6R4
- Moskvich 2141-KR
- Nissan 240RS
- Opel Kadett 4S
- Opel Manta 400
- Opel Manta 400 4WD
- Peugeot 205 Turbo 16
- Peugeot 205 Turbo 16 Evo 2
- Peugeot 305 V6
- Peugeot 504 Pickup
- Porsche 911 Carrera
- Porsche 911 SC RS
- Porsche 911 Turbo RS
- Porsche 924 GTS Rallye
- Porsche 928S
- Porsche 959
- Renault 5 Turbo
- Renault 5 Maxi Turbo
- Renault Alpine A310 V6
- Škoda 130 LR
- Subaru XT 4WD Turbo
- Subaru Leone RX Turbo
- Talbot Horizon
- Talbot Samba Rallye
- Talbot Sunbeam Lotus
- Toyota Celica Twin-Cam Turbo TA64
- Toyota 222D
- Volkswagen Golf GTI

== Group S (Cancelled) ==
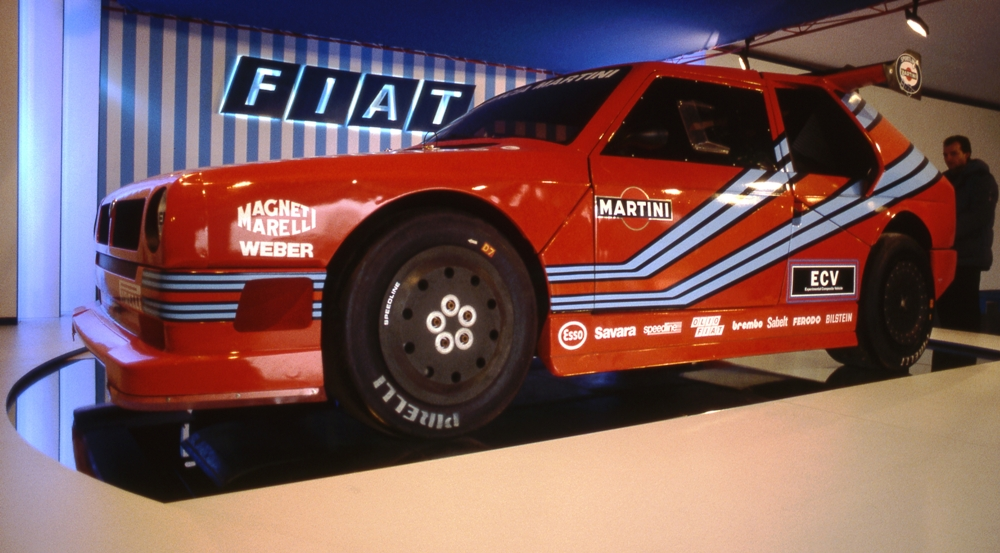
The Lancia ECV for the Group S pictured during its first public presentation in 1986.

- Audi Sport Quattro RS 002
- Ford RS200
- Lada Samara S-proto
- Lancia ECV
- Lancia ECV II
- Toyota 222D
- Opel Kadett Rallye 4x4
- Vauxhall Astra 4S
- SEAT Ibiza Bimotor

== Group A (1982–Current) ==
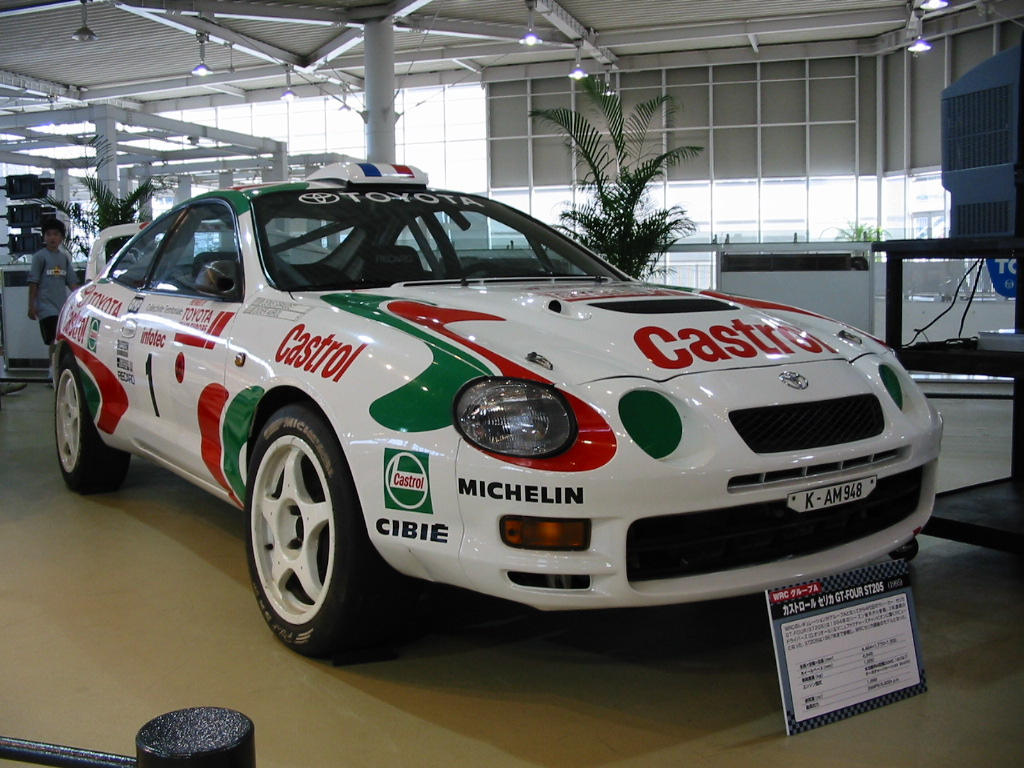
Group A Toyota Celica GT-Four ST205.

- Alfa Romeo GTV6
- Alfa Romeo 75 Turbo
- Alfa Romeo 145
- Audi 200
- Audi 80 Quattro
- Audi 90 Quattro
- Type 85 Audi Coupe Quattro
- Audi Coupé S2
- Audi A3
- Audi A4 Quattro
- BMW 318 Ti Compact
- BMW 325i E36
- BMW E30 M3
- BMW E36 M3
- BMW M3 E46
- Citroën AX GT
- Citroën ZX 16v
- Citroën Xsara Kit Car
- Dacia 1310
- Dodge Neon
- Dodge Omni
- Eagle Talon
- Fiat Panda 45
- Fiat Uno Turbo
- Fiat Ritmo Abarth 130 TC
- Fiat Seicento Kit Car
- Ford Escort XR3i
- Ford Sierra Sapphire Cosworth
- Ford Escort RS Cosworth
- Ford Sierra RS Cosworth 4x4
- Ford Sierra XR 4x4
- FSO Polonez 1600
- FSO 1600 "Bartoś" (rebranded Polski Fiat 125p)
- Honda CRX
- Honda Integra Type-R
- Hyundai Tiburon
- Hyundai Elantra
- Hyundai Accent LC
- Lada Samara 1300
- Lada Riva
- Lancia Delta HF 4WD
- Lancia Delta Integrale
- Lancia Delta Integrale 16V
- Lancia Delta HF Integrale
- Nissan March Super Turbo
- Mazda 323 4WD
- Mazda 323 GT-X
- Mitsubishi Eclipse
- Mitsubishi Starion Turbo
- Mitsubishi Lancer Evolution I
- Mitsubishi Lancer Evolution II
- Mitsubishi Lancer Evolution III
- Mitsubishi Lancer Evolution IV
- Mitsubishi Lancer Evolution V
- Mitsubishi Lancer Evolution VI
- Mitsubishi Lancer Evolution 6.5
- Mitsubishi Lancer EX2000 Turbo
- Mitsubishi Lancer RS
- Mitsubishi Galant VR-4
- Mitsubishi Carisma GT Evo V
- Mitsubishi Carisma GT Evo VI
- Mitsubishi Carisma GT Evo IV
- Nissan 200SX
- Nissan Sunny GTi-R
- Nissan Micra Kit car NME
- Nissan Pulsar GTI-R NME
- Opel Kadett GSi
- Opel Kadett GSi 16V
- Opel Calibra 16V
- Opel Calibra Turbo 4x4
- Opel Omega 3000 12v
- Peugeot 106
- Peugeot 205 GTI
- Peugeot 306 S16
- Peugeot 309 GTi
- Renault Clio Sport
- Renault Clio Williams
- Renault 11 Turbo
- Renault 5 GT Turbo
- Renault 5 Alpine
- Renault Clio 16S
- Renault Mégane
- Saab 900 Turbo
- Saab 9-3 Kit Car
- SEAT Ibiza 1.8 16v
- SEAT Ibiza Kit Car
- Skoda Favorit
- Skoda Felicia
- Subaru RX Turbo
- Subaru Vivio Sedan 4WD
- Subaru Impreza 555
- Subaru Impreza WRX
- Subaru Leone
- Subaru Legacy RS
- Subaru Impreza GC
- Toyota Celica GT-Four ST165
- Toyota Celica GT-Four ST185 / Celica Turbo 4WD
- Toyota Celica GT-Four ST205
- Toyota Corolla GT
- Toyota MR-2
- Toyota Starlet
- Toyota Supra Turbo A
- Toyota Supra 3.0i
- Vauxhall Astra GTE
- Vauxhall Nova GTE
- Volkswagen Gol
- Volkswagen Golf GTI 16V
- Volkswagen Golf Rallye G60
- Volkswagen Senda
- Volvo 343
- Volvo 740
- Volvo 940

== Group N (1982–Current) ==
- Dacia Sandero
- Fiat Stilo Abarth
- FSO Polonez 1600
- Ford Fiesta ST
- Ford Focus Cosworth
- Ford Escort RS Cosworth
- Ford Sierra RS Cosworth
- Honda Civic 1.8
- Honda Civic Type R
- Lancia Delta HF Integrale
- Mazda 323 4WD
- Mazda 323 GT-X
- Mazda 323 GTR
- Mitsubishi Colt Evolution
- Mitsubishi Lancer Evolution I
- Mitsubishi Lancer Evolution II
- Mitsubishi Lancer Evolution III
- Mitsubishi Lancer Evolution IV
- Mitsubishi Lancer Evolution V
- Mitsubishi Lancer Evolution VI
- Mitsubishi Lancer Evolution VII
- Mitsubishi Lancer Evolution VIII
- Mitsubishi Lancer Evolution IX
- Mitsubishi Lancer Evolution X
- Proton PERT
- Nissan Pulsar GTI-R
- Nissan Sentra SE-R
- Proton Satria Neo
- Renault 5 GT Turbo
- Skoda Octavia RS
- Subaru Impreza WRX STI
- Toyota Celica GT-Four ST205
- Volkswagen Polo N1

== World Rally Car (1997–2021) ==
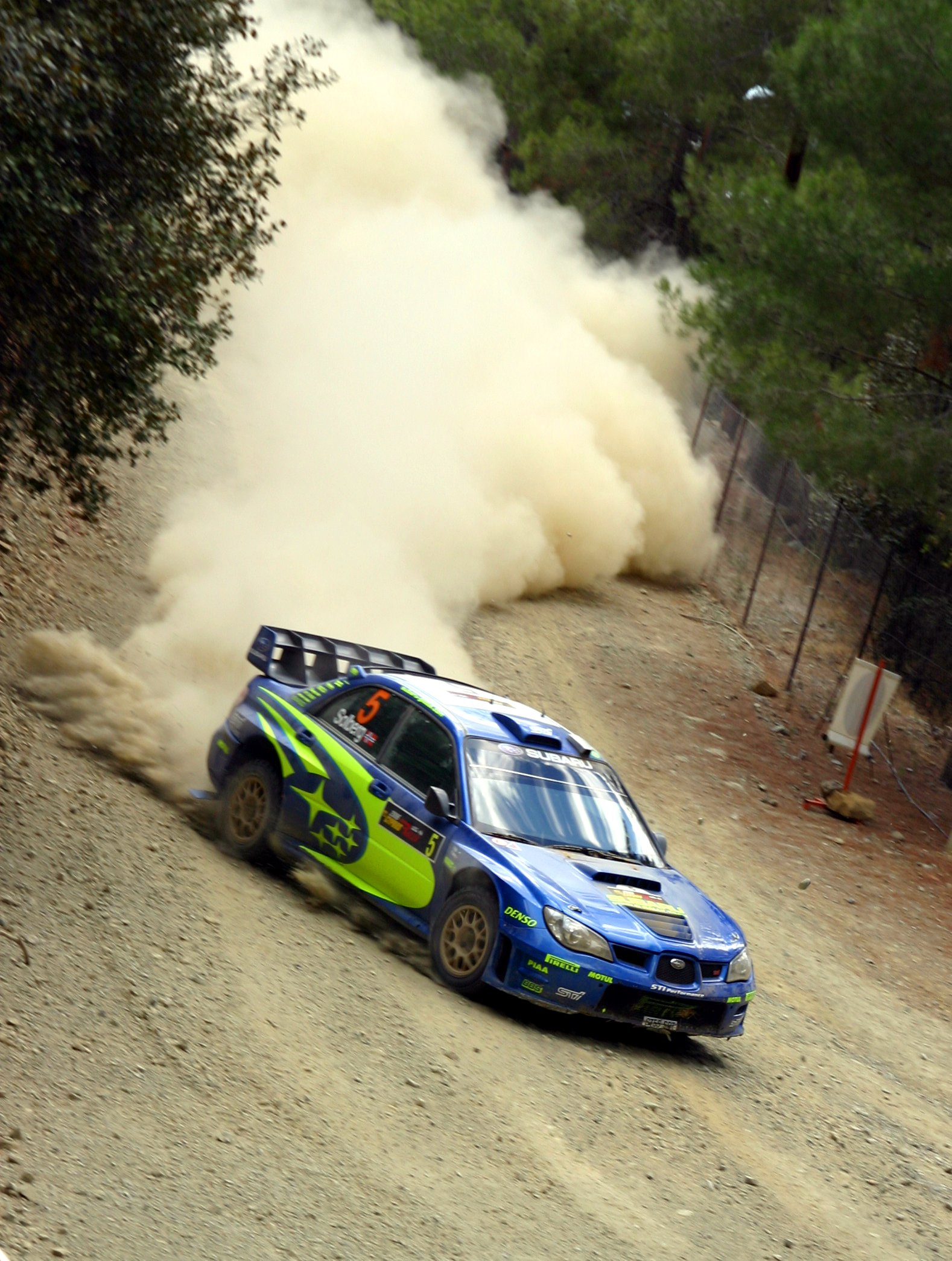
A Subaru Impreza WRC.

| Manufacturer | Model | Image |
|---|---|---|
| Citroen | Xsara WRC | |
| Citroen | C4 WRC | |
| Citroen | DS3 WRC | |
| Citroen | C3 WRC | |
| Ford | Ford Escort WRC | |
| Ford | Focus WRC 99 | |
| Ford | Focus RS WRC 00 | |
| Ford | Focus RS WRC 01 | |
| Ford | Focus RS WRC 02 | |
| Ford | Focus RS WRC 03 | |
| Ford | Focus RS WRC 04 | |
| Ford | Focus RS WRC 06 | |
| Ford | Focus RS WRC 07 | |
| Ford | Focus RS WRC 08 | |
| Ford | Focus RS WRC 09 | |
| Ford | Fiesta RS WRC | |
| Ford | Fiesta WRC | |
| Hyundai | Accent WRC | |
| Hyundai | Accent WRC2 | |
| Hyundai | Accent WRC3 | |
| Hyundai | i20 WRC | |
| Hyundai | i20 Coupe WRC | |
| Mini | John Cooper Works WRC | |
| Mitsubishi | Mitsubishi Lancer Evolution WRC | |
| Mitsubishi | Mitsubishi Lancer Evolution WRC2 | |
| Mitsubishi | Mitsubishi Lancer WRC04 | |
| Mitsubishi | Mitsubishi Lancer WRC05 | |
| Peugeot | 206 WRC | |
| Peugeot | 307 WRC | |
| SEAT | Cordoba WRC | |
| SEAT | Cordoba WRC E2 | |
| Škoda | Octavia WRC | |
| Škoda | Octavia WRC Evo2 | |
| Škoda | Octavia WRC Evo3 | |
| Škoda | Fabia WRC | |
| Subaru | Impreza WRC GC 97 | |
| Subaru | Impreza WRC GC 98 | |
| Subaru | Impreza WRC GC 99 | |
| Subaru | Impreza WRC GC 2000 | |
| Subaru | Impreza WRC GD 2001 | |
| Subaru | Impreza WRC GD 2002 | |
| Subaru | Impreza WRC GD 2003 | |
| Subaru | Impreza WRC GD 2004 | |
| Subaru | Impreza WRC GD 2005 | |
| Subaru | Impreza WRC GD 2006 | |
| Subaru | Impreza WRC GD 2007 | |
| Subaru | Impreza WRC GE 2008 | |
| Suzuki | SX4 WRC | |
| Toyota | Corolla WRC | |
| Toyota | Yaris WRC | |
| Volkswagen | Polo R WRC | |

== Rally1 (2022–present) ==
| Manufacturer | Model | Image |
|---|---|---|
| Ford | Puma Rally1 | |
| Hyundai | i20 N Rally1 | |
| Toyota | GR Yaris Rally1 | |

== Super 1600 (2001–Current) ==
- Alfa Romeo 147 S1600
- Citroën C2 S1600
- Citroën Saxo VTS S1600
- Fiat Palio Abarth S1600
- Fiat Punto S1600
- Ford Puma S1600
- Ford Fiesta S1600
- Honda Civic S1600
- Hyundai Getz S1600
- MG ZR S1600
- Opel Adam Cup
- Opel Corsa S1600
- Opel Astra S1600
- Peugeot 106 S16
- Peugeot 206 S1600
- Peugeot 206 XS
- Peugeot 208 Maxi
- Renault Clio S1600
- Suzuki Swift S1600
- Suzuki Ignis S1600
- Toyota Corolla S1600
- Volkswagen Polo S1600
- Volkswagen Scirocco S1600

== Super 2000 (2010–Current) ==
- Fiat Grande Punto Abarth S2000
- Fiat Stilo Abarth S2000
- Hyundai i20 WRC
- Alfa Romeo 147
- Ford Fiesta S2000
- Peugeot 207 S2000
- Lada 112 VK S2000
- Škoda Fabia S2000
- Toyota Corolla S2000/RunX
- Toyota Corolla TRD S2000
- Toyota Auris S2000
- Toyota Yaris S2000
- Volkswagen Polo S2000
- MG ZR S2000
- Honda Civic S2000
- Opel Corsa S2000
- Proton Satria Neo S2000
- Fiat Grande Punto S2000
- Mini John Cooper Works S2000
- Mini Cooper S2000 1.6T
- Suzuki Swift Maxi S2000
- Mitsubishi Mirage S2000
- Dacia Logan S2000 (Never entered competition)

== RGT (2012–current) ==
- Alpine A110 Rally R-GT
- Fiat Abarth 124 RGT
- Lotus Exige R-GT
- Porsche 996 GT3
- Porsche 997 GT3
- Porsche Cayman RGT

== Group Race (2012–current) ==
- Audi A1 R4
- Audi S1 AP4
- BMW 125i Coupé R3
- Chevrolet Agile MR
- Chevrolet Sonic RS
- Citroën C2 R2
- Citroën C2 R2 Max
- Citroën C3 R5
- Citroën DS3 MR
- Citroën DS3 R1
- Citroën DS3 R3
- Citroën DS3 R3 Max
- Citroën DS3 R3T
- Citroën DS3 R3T Max
- Citroën DS3 R5
- Citroën DS3 RRC
- Dacia Logan R3
- Dacia Sandero R3
- Dacia Sandero R4
- Daihatsu Mira R4
- DR 1 R1
- Fiat 500 Abarth R3T
- Fiat 500X R4
- Fiat Punto R3
- Fiat Grande Punto R3D
- Fiat Palio MR
- Ford Fiesta MK6.5 R2
- Ford Fiesta MR
- Ford Fiesta R1
- Ford Fiesta R2
- Ford Fiesta R2T
- Ford Fiesta R2T19
- Ford Fiesta MK8 R2T
- Ford Fiesta R2T National
- Ford Fiesta R200
- Ford Fiesta R5
- Ford Fiesta R5+
- Ford Fiesta R5 Evo2
- Ford Fiesta MK8 R5
- Ford Fiesta RRC
- Honda Fit R2
- Honda Civic Type-R R3
- Honda Civic R3C
- Hommell Herlinette RS 2
- Holden Barina AP4
- Hyundai i20 R5
- Hyundai i20 AP4
- Hyundai i30 Turbo
- Lada Kalina R4
- Mazda 2 AP4
- Mazda RX-8 R3
- Mini John Cooper Works RRC
- Mini Cooper JCW R1T
- Mini Cooper S R4
- Mitsubishi Lancer Evo IX R4
- Mitsubishi Lancer Evo X R4
- Mitsubishi Colt R5
- Mitsubishi Mirage R5
- Nissan Micra R1
- Nissan Micra R2
- Nissan Micra R4
- Opel Adam R2
- Opel Corsa R5
- Peugeot 207 MR
- Peugeot 207 RC R3T
- Peugeot 208 MR
- Peugeot 208 R2
- Peugeot 208 T16
- Peugeot 208 R5
- Proton Iriz R5
- Renault Clio R3
- Renault Clio R3C
- Renault Clio R3T
- Renault Clio R3 Maxi
- Renault Clio R3 Maxi Evo
- Renault Clio RS
- Renault Clio RS R3T
- Renault Clio Ragnotti
- Renault Mégane RS
- Renault Twingo RS R1
- Renault Twingo III R1
- Renault Twingo R2
- Renault Twingo RS R2
- Renault Twingo RS Evo R2
- Seat Leon Cupra R
- Škoda Fabia RS
- Škoda Fabia R2
- Škoda Fabia R5
- Škoda Fabia R5 Evo
- Subaru Impreza STi R4
- Suzuki Baleno R1
- Suzuki Baleno SR R1
- Suzuki Swift R1
- Suzuki Swift R1B
- Suzuki Swift R2
- Suzuki Swift R+
- Toyota Etios R4
- Toyota Etios R5
- Toyota GT86 CS-R3
- Toyota GT86 R3C
- Toyota Run-X RSi
- Toyota Starlet
- Toyota Vitz R1
- Toyota Vitz R1B
- Toyota Yaris R1
- Toyota Yaris R4
- Toyota Yaris R5
- Vauxhall Adam R2
- Volkswagen Gol Trend MR
- Volkswagen Polo R2
- Volkswagen Polo GTI R5
- Volkswagen Polo RN4
