= YTO =

YTO may refer to:

- Yto Barrada (born 1971), Franco-Moroccan multimedia visual artist
- YTO Cargo Airlines, a Chinese cargo airline
- YTO Group, a manufacturing company based in China
- Willow Run Transmission, motor vehicle factory also known as Ypsilanti Transmission Operations or YTO
- YTO (IATA), a multiple airport code (IATA) for the Greater Toronto Area, Ontario, Canada
