= FSO Polonez =

Polish motor vehicle

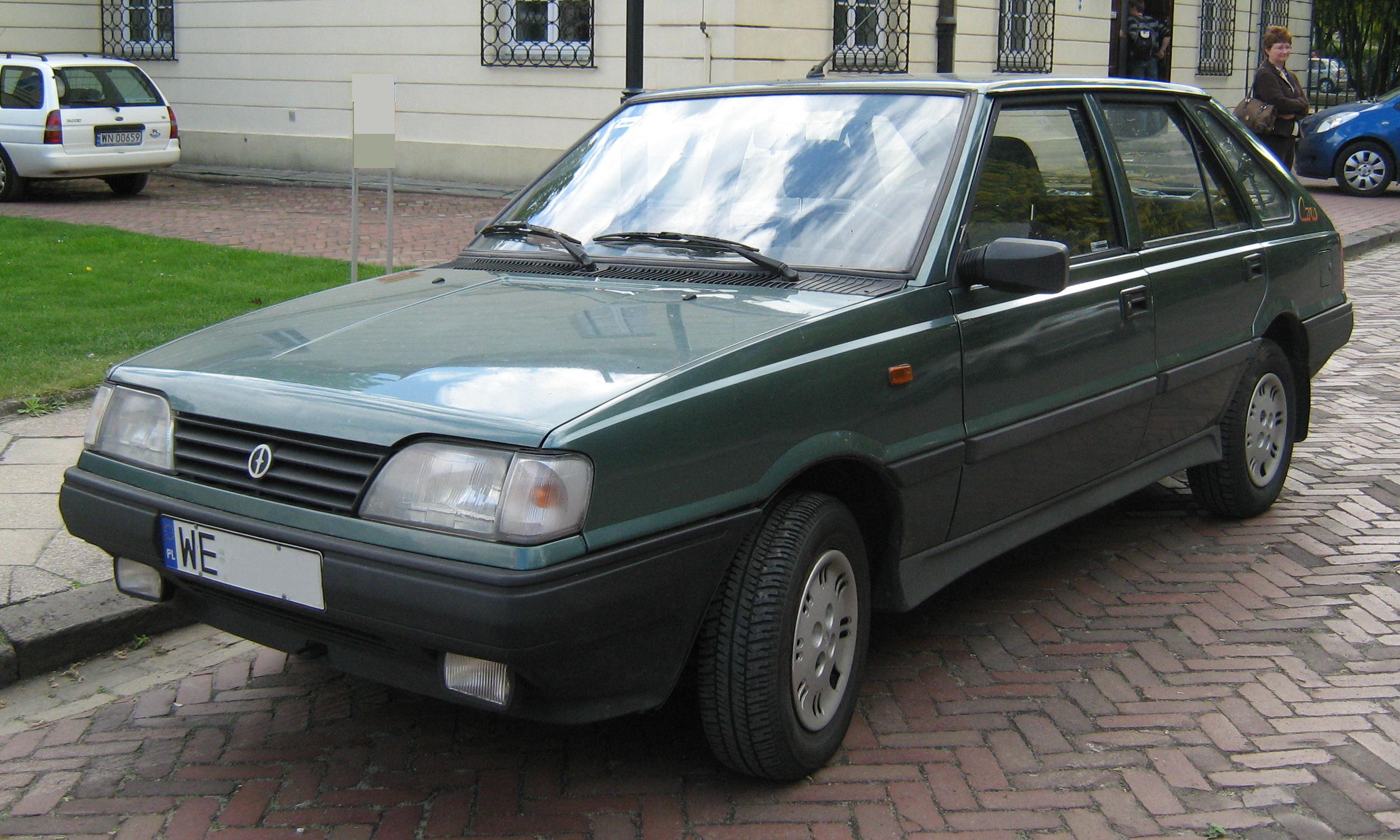

Overview
- Manufacturer: FSO
- Production: 1978–2002; 1988–2003 (pickup); 1983–1992 (Egypt); 1990–1995 (China)
- Assembly: Poland: Warsaw; Poland: Nysa; Egypt: Cairo (Nasr/AAV); China: Luoyang (Dongfanghong); Thailand: Bangkok (Karnasuta)

Body and chassis
- Class: Large family car
- Layout: FR layout

Chronology
- Predecessor: FSO 125p

The FSO Polonez is a motor vehicle that was developed in Poland in collaboration with FIAT and produced by Fabryka Samochodów Osobowych from 1978 to 2002. It was based on the Polski Fiat 125p platform with a new hatchback designed by Zbigniew Wattson, Walter de Silva and Giorgetto Giugiaro. It was available in body styles that included two- and four-door compact-sized cars, station wagons, as well as commercial versions as pickup truck, cargo van, and ambulance. Production totaled more than one million units, excluding the pickup truck and van variants. The Polonez was marketed in other nations and was popular in its domestic market until Poland joined the European Union in 2004.

The car's name comes from the Polish dance, the polonaise, and was chosen through a readers' poll conducted by the newspaper Życie Warszawy.

In 2021, about 33,000 vehicles were still registered in Poland.

== Background ==
The Polonez was based on the Polski Fiat 125p that Fabryka Samochodów Osobowych (FSO) built under license from Fiat. The internal components, including updated 1.3/1.5 Litre engines, (pistons and carburetor), the chassis, and other mechanicals, were from the Polski Fiat 125p. However, the body was an entirely new liftback initially designed in the early 1970s by Centro Stile Fiat as a prototype for Fiat. After the Polish side started cooperation with Fiat over a new car, the original design was changed due to Polish requirements. The car was meant to be equipped with Fiat's 2.0 Litre DOHC engines in the 1980s, but financial problems at the time made it impossible to purchase a license from Fiat. This made producing the 125p alongside the Polonez possible for more than a decade. Moreover, mechanical improvements only occurred when they could be applied to both cars. This limitation changed after the production of the 125p ended in 1991.

An advantage of the FSO Polonez is its safety in an accident, especially compared to many of its rivals from the Eastern Bloc. In 1978, it was the only Eastern European car built to pass U.S. crash tests. Crash tests were performed in 1994 according to EU safety regulations, so the Polonez could be exported worldwide. They proved the car to be safe. The Caro 1.9 GLD hitting a concrete block (without an energy-absorbing metal cage) with 40% of the front at 50 km/h (31 mph) survived very well. All doors could be opened without any difficulty, there were no critical injuries for passengers, and no fuel leakage occurred.

== FSO Polonez (1978–1991) ==
FSO Polonez
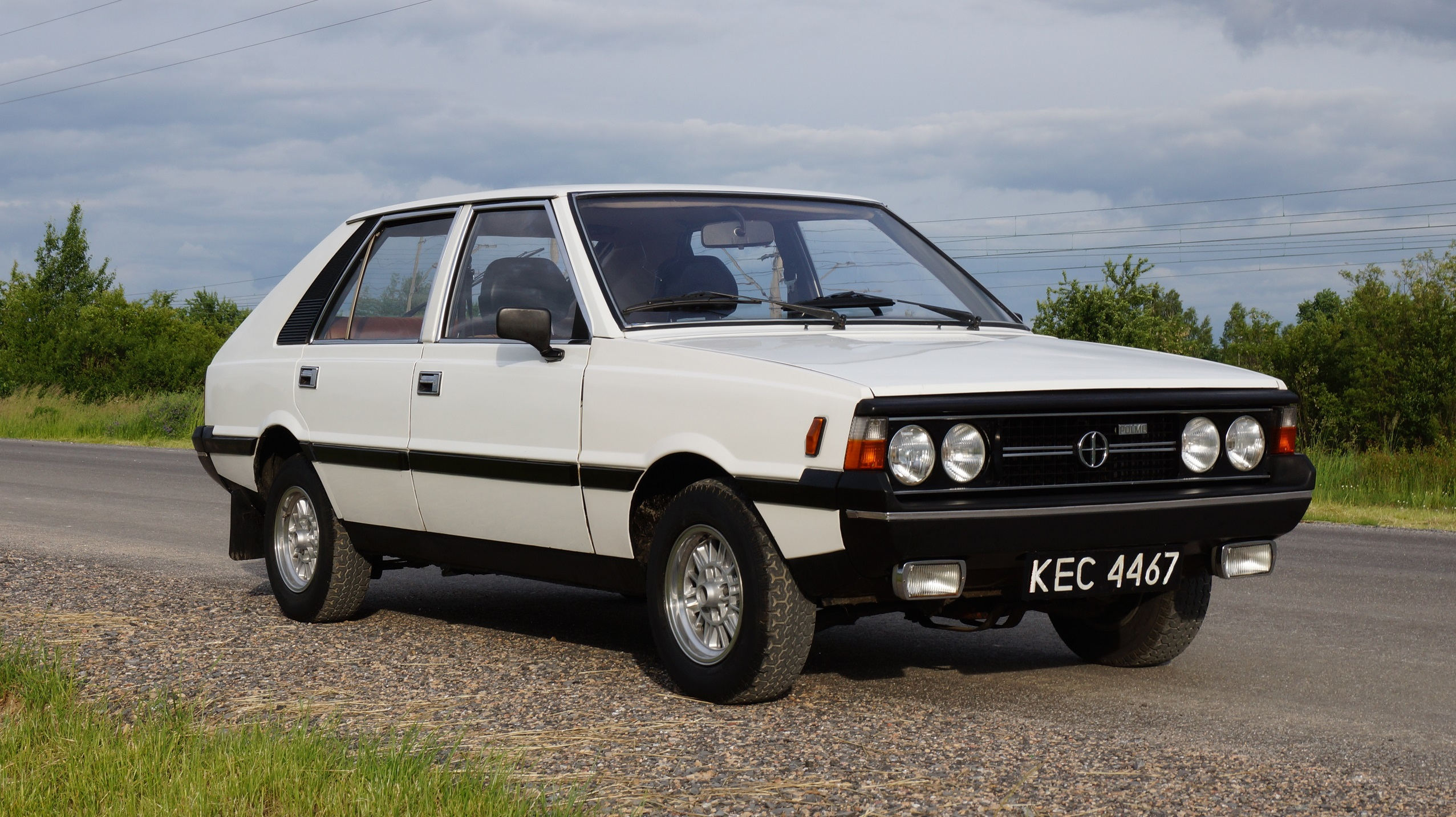

Overview
- Manufacturer: FSO
- Also called: FSO Prima; FSO Truck (pickup); Nasr Polonez; Yituo LT5021; Yituo LT5022
- Production: 1978–1991; 1988–1992 (pickup); 1983–1992 (Egypt); 1990–1995 (China)
- Assembly: Poland: Warsaw; Poland: Nysa; Egypt: Cairo (Nasr/AAV); China: Luoyang (Dongfanghong); Thailand: Bangkok (Karnasuta)
- Designer: Walter de Silva; Zbigniew Wattson; Giorgetto Giugiaro

Body and chassis
- Class: Large family car
- Body style: 3-door hatchback (1979–1983); 5-door hatchback (1978–1991); 2-door pickup (1988–1992); 2-door pickup (extended cab) (1992); 5-door station wagon/van
- Layout: FR layout, MR layout (Stratopolonez)
- Related: Fiat 1300 and 1500; Fiat 125; Polski Fiat 125p

Powertrain
- Engine: petrol: 1.3 L OHV I4; 1.5 L OHV I4; 1.6 L OHV I4; 2.0 L Fiat DOHC I4; 2.0 L Ford SOHC I4; diesel: 1.9 L XUD9A diesel I4 (pickup); 2.0 L VM HR488 diesel I4
- Transmission: 4-speed manual; 5-speed manual

Dimensions
- Wheelbase: 2,509–3,116 mm (98.8–122.7 in)
- Length: 4,272 mm (168.2 in) (hatchback); 4,616 mm (181.7 in) (station wagon/van and pickup); 5,000 mm (196.9 in) (extended cab pickup)
- Width: 1,650 mm (65.0 in)
- Height: 1,420 mm (55.9 in)
- Curb weight: 1,115–1,290 kg (2,458–2,844 lb)

Chronology
- Predecessor: Polski Fiat 125p
- Successor: FSO Polonez Caro

=== Development ===
In 1974 FSO chose FIAT's Experimental Safety Vehicle project ESV 2000 prototype as the base of a new car which became known by Fiat at the Type 137.

FSO's designer Zbigniew Wattson joined Walter de Silva to convert the ESV project to suit the donor Fiat 125P floorpan and running gear and designed the exterior and interior for these prototypes of Type 137 and sent them to Poland for FSO to turn into a production car.

=== Debut ===
In May 1978, mass production commenced. The official premiere of the FSO Polonez 1500 and FSO Polonez 1300 took place.

In 1979, the FSO Polonez 2000, sold mostly to government officials, appeared. The Polonez 2000 has a Fiat twin-cam engine with 1,995 cc, 82 kW (110 hp), a 5-speed gearbox, a 0–100 km/h acceleration of 12.0 seconds, and a 175 km/h (109 mph) top speed.

The FSO Polonez 2000 Rally with a 2-liter Fiat DOHC engine was debuted in the Rallye Monte Carlo.

In 1980, the FSO Polonez 1300 and 1500 three-door appeared. With the same short front doors as the five-door version, it was produced from 1979 until 1981 with about 300 units.

In 1981 and 1983, the FSO Polonez Coupé, with three-door bodywork was introduced. It had the usual 1,481 cc engine with 60 kW (82 PS) or the 2.0-litre Fiat Twin Cam unit. It was the first FSO model to feature electronic ignition and fuel economizer owing to a supply of pre-heated air to the suction manifold. Only a few dozen were produced.

In 1983, the Polonez C and CE were introduced as a more economical version and was known as the "Kryzysowy" (Crisis) model. This model was stripped of a variety of equipment and trim including the change of rubber bumpers for a black painted steel bumper, Changing the four front lights to a pair of rectangular ones that came from the Wartburg 353, deletion of the side rubbing strips, rear window wiper-washer, fog lamps, hub caps, luggage cover, and tachometer. Basic vinyl was used on the seats and in the luggage compartment, and static seat belts replaced the inertia reel ones. The CE model featured electronic ignition.

At the other end appeared a new top version, the FSO Polonez 1500 X. This was fitted with the AB 1,481 cc engine of 60 kW (82 PS), a five-speed gearbox (final drive ratio 4:3), and a radio. It was sold in the domestic market, usually for U.S. dollar payments.

In 1983, the Polski Fiat 125p was renamed FSO 125p, after FSO's licence rights to the Fiat badge expired. The new naming system for FSO's models was as follows:

- FSO 125p: 1.3 L, 1.3 ML, 1.3 ME, 1.5 C, 1.5 L, 1.5 ML, 1.5 MS, 1.5 ME
- FSO Polonez 1.3 C, 1.3 CE, 1.3 L, 1.3 LE, 1.5 C, 1.5 CE, 1.5 L, 1.5 LS, 1.5 LE, 1.5 X, 2000.

Also in 1983, the FSO Polonez 2.0 D Turbo with an Italian VM Motori HR 488 engine of 1,995 cc appeared. It produces 62 kW (84 PS) at 4,300 rpm and 163 N⋅m (120 lb⋅ft) at 2,500 rpm. Final drive ratio is 3,727, for a 0–100 km/h acceleration time of 20,0 s, and a top speed of 146 km/h (91 mph). Fuel consumption is 7.1/10.6/10.0 L/100 km, and approximately 100 cars were produced to this specification.

- 1984 FSO Polonez 2000 Turbo 3-door - rally car, never got rally homologation, bodywork like Coupé version, but without the Coupé-like front. This car received a turbocharged 1,995 cc Fiat engine, in some variants combined with a supercharger for better torque.
- 1985 FSO Polonez - first five-door cars with a Coupé-like front

During 1985, the British importer introduced an upmarket version called the FSO Polonez Prima, which received black and gold sidestriping, a glass sunroof, and rear seatbelts among other extras.

- 1986 FSO Polonez 1.5 Turbo mass production launched. Also, a rally version 1.5C Turbo known as "Iron Rain" official premiere.

FSO Polonez - first cars with additional rear-side windows in the C-pillar.

In 1987, the FSO Polonez 1.6 LE appeared. It has a 1,598 cc inline-four with 64 kW (87 PS) at 5,200 rpm and 132 N⋅m (97 lb⋅ft) at 3,800 rpm. Top speed is 155 km/h (96 mph). There was also the rare FSO 125p 1.6 ME, with the same engine but a top speed of 157 km/h (98 mph). Very few were made.

FSO Polonez modifications: stamped rear spoiler instead of plastic one, new model labels on the sticking foil, new version coding system with an 'S' supposedly meaning that the car had the additional rear-side windows in the C-pillar, a feature was often broken in practice. The versions available were:

1,3 SCE, 1.3 SL, 1.3 SLE, 1,5 CE, 1.5 L, 1,5 LE, 1,5 SCE, 1,5 SL, 1,5 SLE, 1,6 SLE, 2.0 SLE

In 1988, the FSO Polonez 1500 Turbo with AA 1,481 cc engine, 190 PS (140 kW) at 7,000 rpm, 240 N⋅m (177 lb⋅ft) at 3,200 rpm, 8,5 s, 220 km/h (137 mph) appeared. This was a rally version only, built to group A specifications. Following this competition version, the FSO Polonez 1.5 SLE Turbo with a turbocharged AA engine was introduced in December 1989. With a compression ratio of 8.5 to 1, the 1,481 cc inline-four produces 105 hp (78 kW) at 6,000 rpm, and 180 N⋅m (133 lb⋅ft) at 3,200 rpm. The zero to 100 km/h acceleration was in 11,0 s, and the top speed is 180 km/h (112 mph). A catalyzed version with 70 kW (95 PS) was also available. The Turbo Polonez' were built mainly in rally versions (group N), although on special order a Turbo-kit could be installed in mass-produced cars.

- 1988 Prototypes of the FSO Polonez in an ambulance and van versions based on the FSO Truck (pick-up). Lowered chassis and an additional right-side door were added features.

In 1989, the facelifted '89 FSO Polonez was introduced. Changes included a rear boot lid lowered to the bumper level, new rear lamps, a rear window wiper-washer placed horizontally, and side repeaters placed horizontally near the front doors. In January 1989, the first catalyzed Polonez (1500 only) was displayed at the Amsterdam Auto Show. Simultaneously, a version with an Italian FNM-built (Fratelli Negri Motori) 1,366 cc (1.4 L) turbo-diesel and a five-speed manual appeared (called the "Polonez Piedra 1.3 Turbodiesel"), specifically for the Belgian market. This engine has 60 PS (44 kW)at 4,500 rpm, enough for a top speed of 155 km/h (96 mph).

In 1990, the FSO Polonez 2.0 SLE appeared, fitted with Ford's 105 PS (77 kW) 2.0-litre engine, 12.5 seconds acceleration to 100 km/h and a top speed of 165 km/h (103 mph).

=== Stratopolonez ===
A unique version of FSO Polonez dubbed Stratopolonez (also known as FSO Polonez 2500 Racing) uses Lancia Stratos components salvaged from a crashed car that was driven by Andrzej Jaroszewicz, the son of Prime Minister Piotr Jaroszewicz in 1977 on Rally Poland. He failed to complete the rally because of crashing into a tree.

The resulting salvaged vehicle was designed by Ośrodek Badawczo-Rozwojowy FSO (FSO Research and Development Center) in 1978. The car uses an FSC Star radiator located in the front (as a counterweight due to the vehicle being now mid-engined), engine output was improved to 280 PS, and does not share spoilers with FSO Polonez 2000 Rally.

This car was raced until 1985. Drivers were Andrzej Jaroszewicz, Adam Polak, Maciej Stawowiak, and Marian Bublewicz. Marian made improvements, such as adding wider rear wheel arches and strengthening areas around the windshield. The vehicle went to Museum of Technology, Warsaw afterward. In 2000, the car was restored by Warsaw Motor Technical College students as part of their diploma thesis.

=== Gallery ===
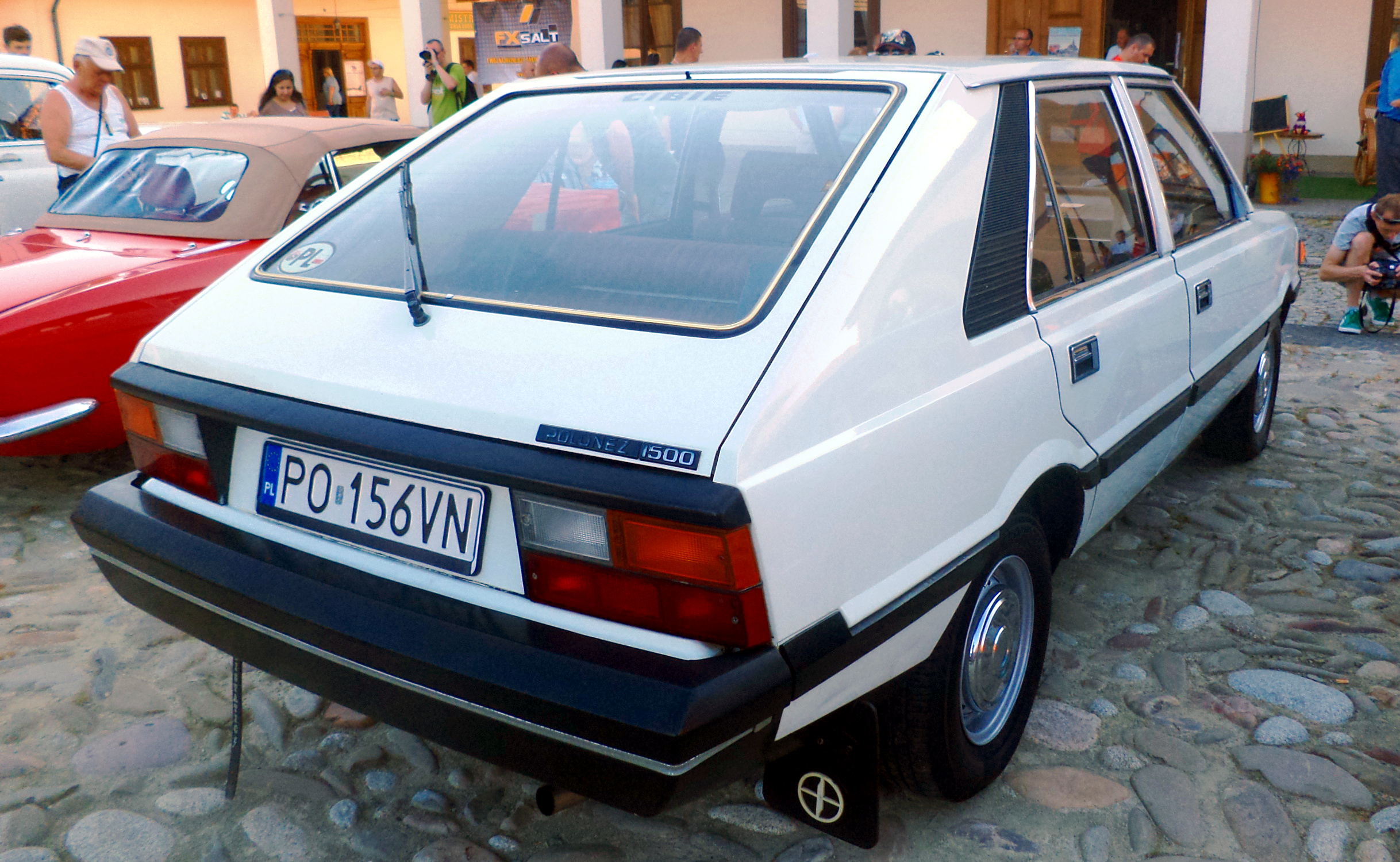
FSO Polonez (1978 design, rear view)

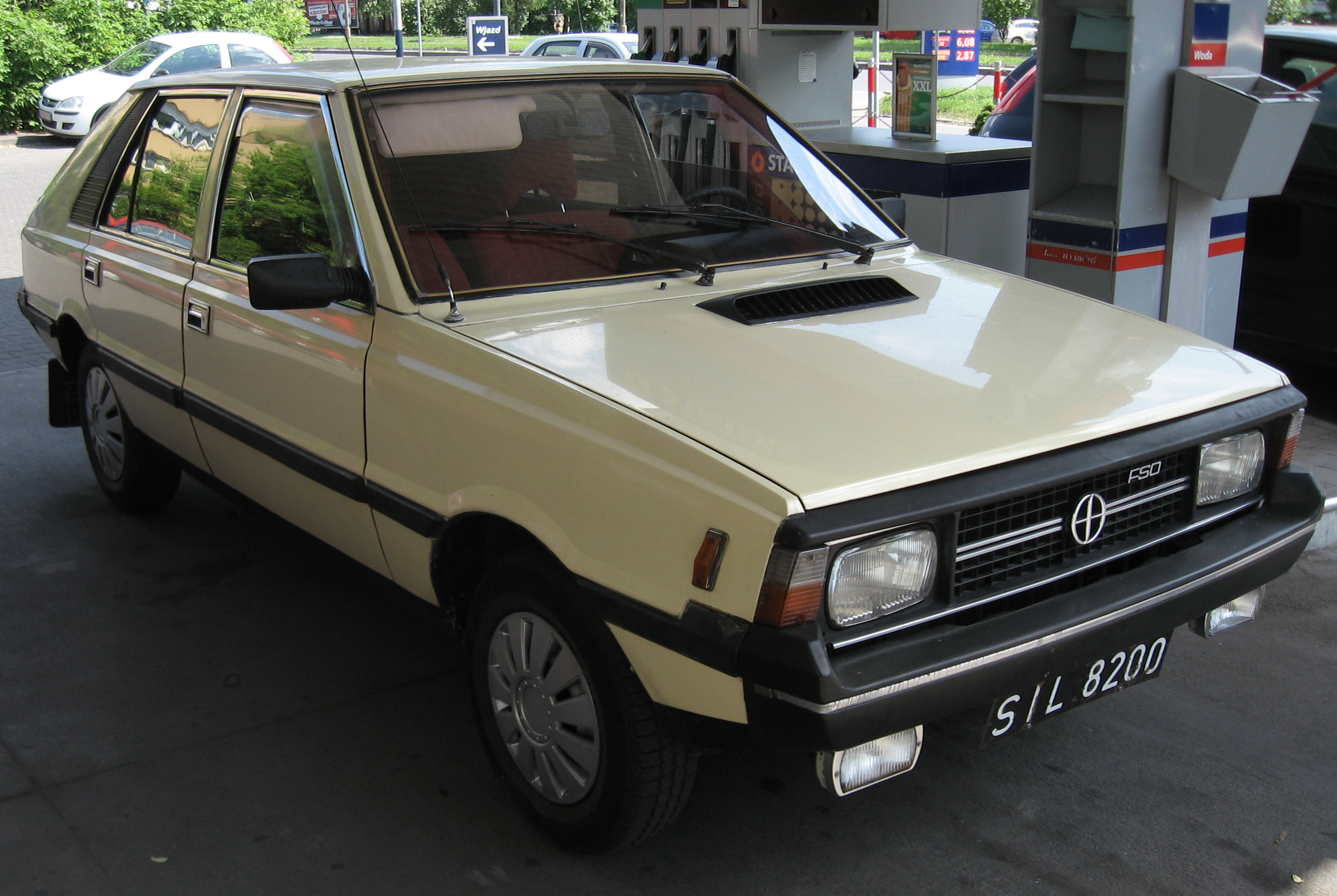
1983 FSO Polonez Lux

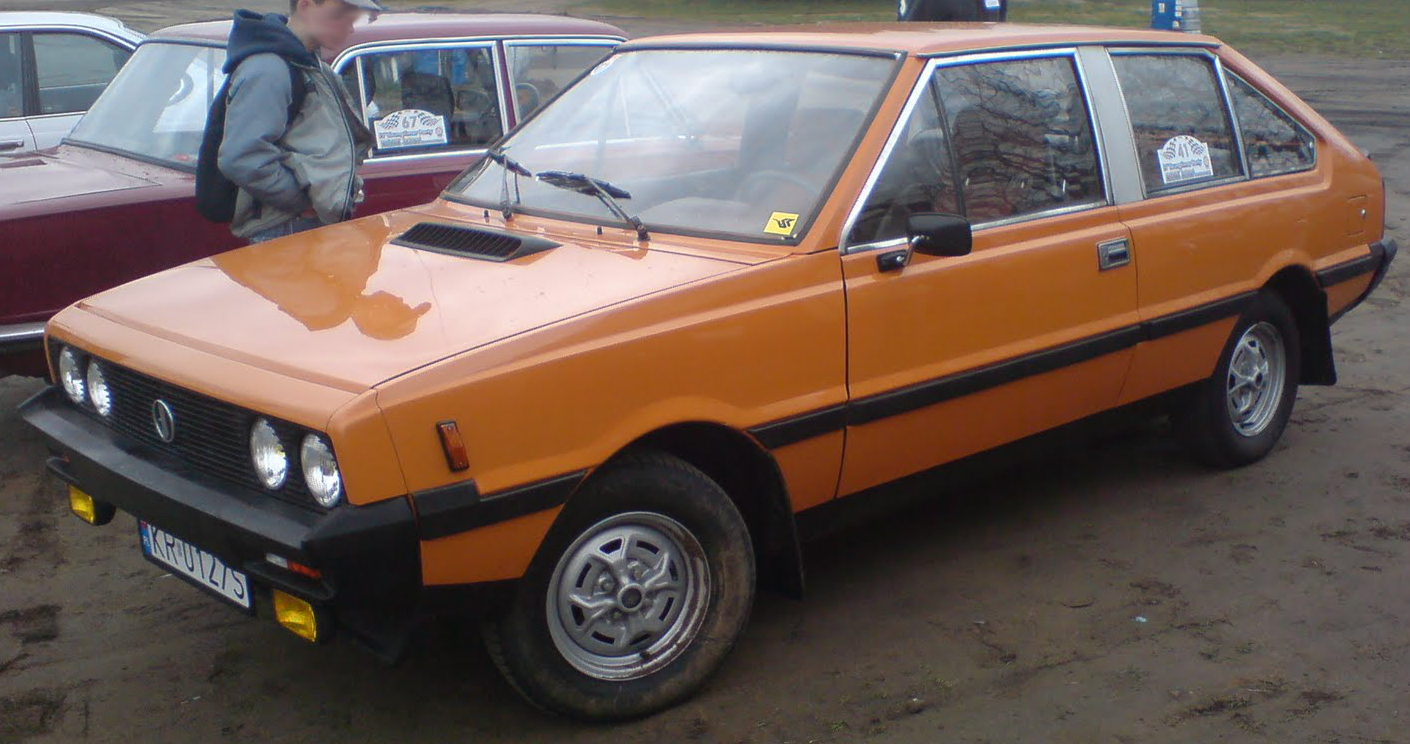
The FSO Polonez Coupé, a limited edition

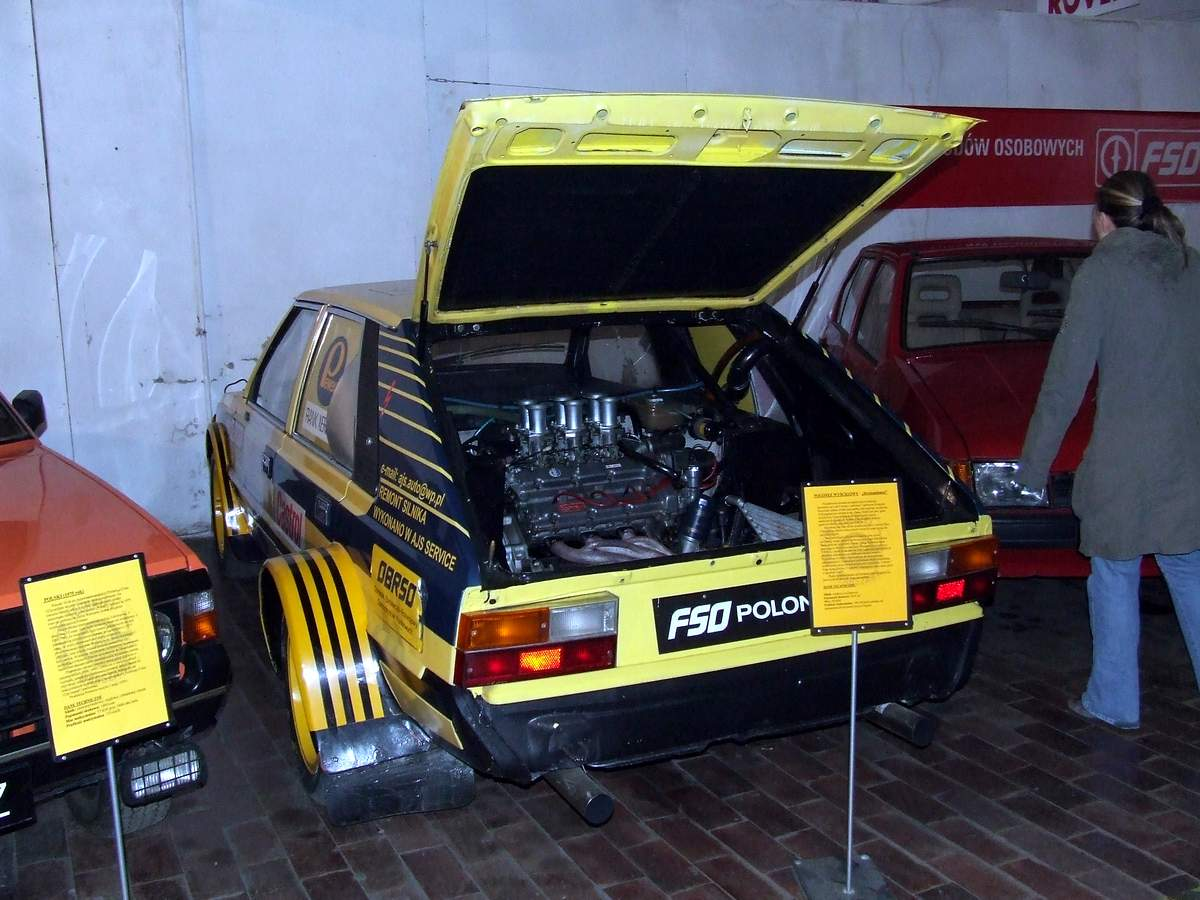
The Stratopolonez used the mid-mounted engine from the Lancia Stratos

== Polonez Caro (1991–1997) ==
FSO Polonez Caro
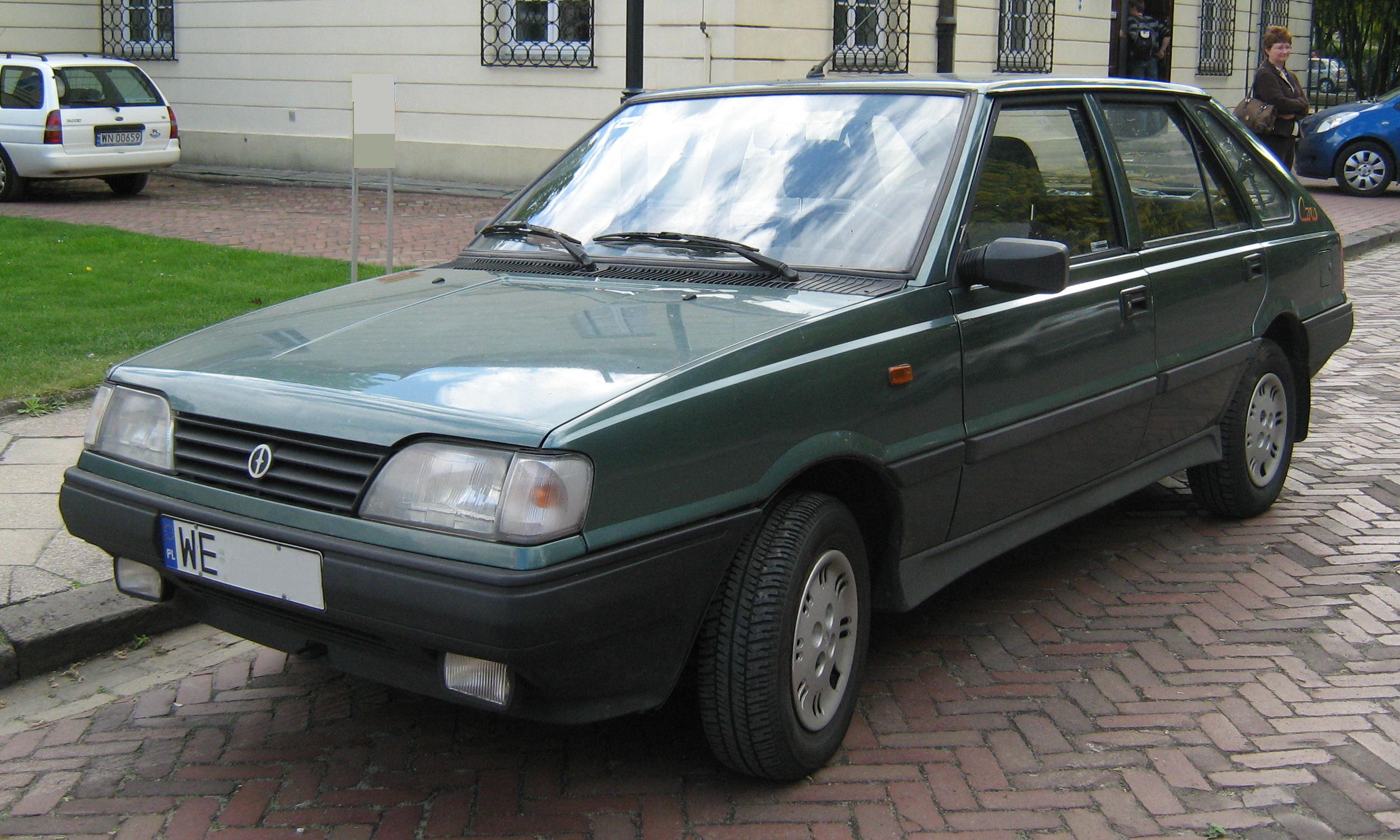

Overview
- Manufacturer: FSO
- Also called: FSO Caro; FSO Celina (sedan); FSO Prima; FSO Truck (pickup); FSO Caro Pick-up
- Production: 1991–1997; 1992–1997 (pickup)
- Assembly: Poland: Warsaw; Poland: Nysa
- Designer: Antoni Kasznicki; Zbigniew Kowalczyk

Body and chassis
- Class: Large family car
- Body style: 5-door hatchback (1991–1997); 4-door sedan (1996–1997); 2-door pickup (1992–1997); 2-door pickup (extended cab) (1992–1997); 5-door LAV (1993–1997)
- Layout: FR layout

Powertrain
- Engine: 1.4 L Rover 14K16 DOHC 16V I4; 1.5 L OHV I4; 1.6 L OHV I4; 2.0 L Ford SOHC; 1.9 L XUD9A diesel SOHC I4
- Transmission: 5-speed manual

Dimensions
- Wheelbase: 2,509–3,116 mm (98.8–122.7 in)
- Length: 4,318 mm (170.0 in); 4,616 mm (181.7 in) (station wagon/van and pickup); 5,000 mm (196.9 in) (extended cab pickup); 5,300 mm (208.7 in) (double cab pickup)
- Width: 1,650 mm (65.0 in)
- Height: 1,420 mm (55.9 in) 1,800 mm (70.9 in) (LAV)
- Curb weight: 1,115 kg (2,458 lb)-1,170 kg (2,580 lb)

Chronology
- Predecessor: FSO Polonez
- Successor: Daewoo-FSO Polonez Caro Plus

1991 marked the end of FSO 125p production. Along with this, FSO's 1,295 cc engine ended production. FSO imports to the United Kingdom were temporarily stopped. On the other hand, the facelifted FSO Polonez Caro appeared. It had new headlamps and grille (similar to the design of the FSO Wars, a prototype car that was supposed to be the successor to Polonez), new front and rear bumpers, a steering wheel, new rooflet over instruments, and improved front crash safety. Also new was the FSO Polonez Caro 1.9 GLD with Citroën's 1,905 cc diesel engine, 50 kW (68 PS), 120 N⋅m (89 lb⋅ft), and a top speed of 150 km/h (93 mph). The Caro GLD was sold across mainland Europe.

The other versions in pricelist:

FSO Polonez Caro 1.5 GLE - 60 kW (82 PS)
FSO Polonez Caro 1.6 GLE - 64 kW (87 PS)
FSO Polonez Caro 2.0 GLE - Ford's 77 kW (105 PS) engine and gearbox from the Ford Sierra (approx. 1,000 units)

- 1992 FSO Polonez 1.5 GLI, 1.6 GLI with ABIMEX single-point injection, with or without catalytic converter.
- 1993 (August) Polonez after the next facelift: front and rear track 60 mm (2.4 in) wider, fresh air inlet moved from hood to the front of the windscreen, better front and rear wipe-wash kinematics, longer arms and larger wiped area, changes in the dashboard: circular speedometer and rev counter, four instead of two fresh air outlets, illuminated switches, and remote headlamps shaft regulator.

(December) FSO Polonez 1.4 GLI 16V with Rover 1396 cc engine, 76 kW (103 PS) at 6000 rpm, 127 N⋅m (94 lb⋅ft) at 5000 rpm, 11,9 s, 178 km/h (111 mph), with or without catalytic converter.

FSO Polonez Sedan prototype - later produced as the FSO Atu - with 4-door sedan bodywork, with a completely new dashboard and upholstery (project by FSO), new rear suspension: rigid rear axle with longitudinal wishbones, reaction bars, and coil springs. The rear lamps are the same as in the Caro version.

Two prototypes of the FSO Polonez Kombi (station wagon). The next prototype: FSO Analog 4WD, a light off-road car with 4-door pick-up bodywork and four-wheel drive.

Export to the UK restarted: FSO Caro (Polonez 1.6 and 1.9 D) and FSO Pick-up (Truck)

- 1995 The next prototype of the 4-door FSO Polonez Sedan was introduced at the 1995 Poznań Motor Show - the car had new a dashboard (see 1994) and new rear lamps.

Girling-Lucas brakes were introduced.

- 1996 (February) The first series of the new FSO Atu 1.6 GLI was sold, and produced from December 1995 until February 1996. (June) Mass production of the FSO Polonez Atu 1.6 GLI and FSO Polonez Atu 1.4 GLI 16V, very few cars in FSO Polonez Atu 1.9 GLD specification with a Diesel engine. The FSO Atu was renamed FSO Polonez Atu after protests by the ATU insurance company.

Production of the FSO Polonez Caro 1.9 GLD stopped.

End of export to the Netherlands, the last foreign market for Polonez passenger versions; the final offering in the Netherlands consisted of:

FSO Prima (Polonez Caro) 1.6 GLI
FSO Prima (Polonez Caro) 1.4 GLI 16V
FSO Celina (Atu) 1.6 GLI

=== Engines ===
Model	Engine	Displacement	Valvetrain	Fuel system	Max. power at rpm	Max. torque at rpm	Top speed	Years
Petrol engines
1.4 GLI	K16	1398 cc	DOHC 16v	Multi-point fuel injection	103 PS (76 kW; 102 hp) at 6000 rpm	127 N⋅m (94 lb⋅ft) at 5000 rpm	176 km/h (109 mph)	1993–1997
1.5 GLE	AB	1481 cc	OHV 8v	Carburettor	82 PS (60 kW; 81 hp) at 5200 rpm	114 N⋅m (84 lb⋅ft) at 3400 rpm	155 km/h (96 mph)	1991–1994
1.5 GLI	AE/AF	1481 cc	OHV 8v	Single-point fuel injection	77 PS (57 kW; 76 hp) at 5400 rpm	115 N⋅m (85 lb⋅ft) at 2800 rpm	158 km/h (98 mph)	1992–1995
1.6 GLE	CB	1598 cc	OHV 8v	Carburettor	87 PS (64 kW; 86 hp) at 5200 rpm	132 N⋅m (97 lb⋅ft) at 3800 rpm	160 km/h (99 mph)	1991–1994
1.6 GLI	CE/CF	1598 cc	OHV 8v	Single-point fuel injection	81 PS (60 kW; 80 hp) at 5200 rpm	125 N⋅m (92 lb⋅ft) at 3200 rpm	163 km/h (101 mph)	1992–1997
2.0 GLE	Ford SOHC	1993 cc	SOHC 8v	Carburettor	105 PS (77 kW; 104 hp) at 5200 rpm	157 N⋅m (116 lb⋅ft) at 4000 rpm	179 km/h (111 mph)	1991
Diesel engines
1.9 GLD	XUD9A	1905 cc	SOHC 8v	Indirect injection	70 PS (51 kW; 69 hp) at 4600 rpm	120 N⋅m (89 lb⋅ft) at 2000 rpm	153 km/h (95 mph)	1991–1997

=== Gallery ===
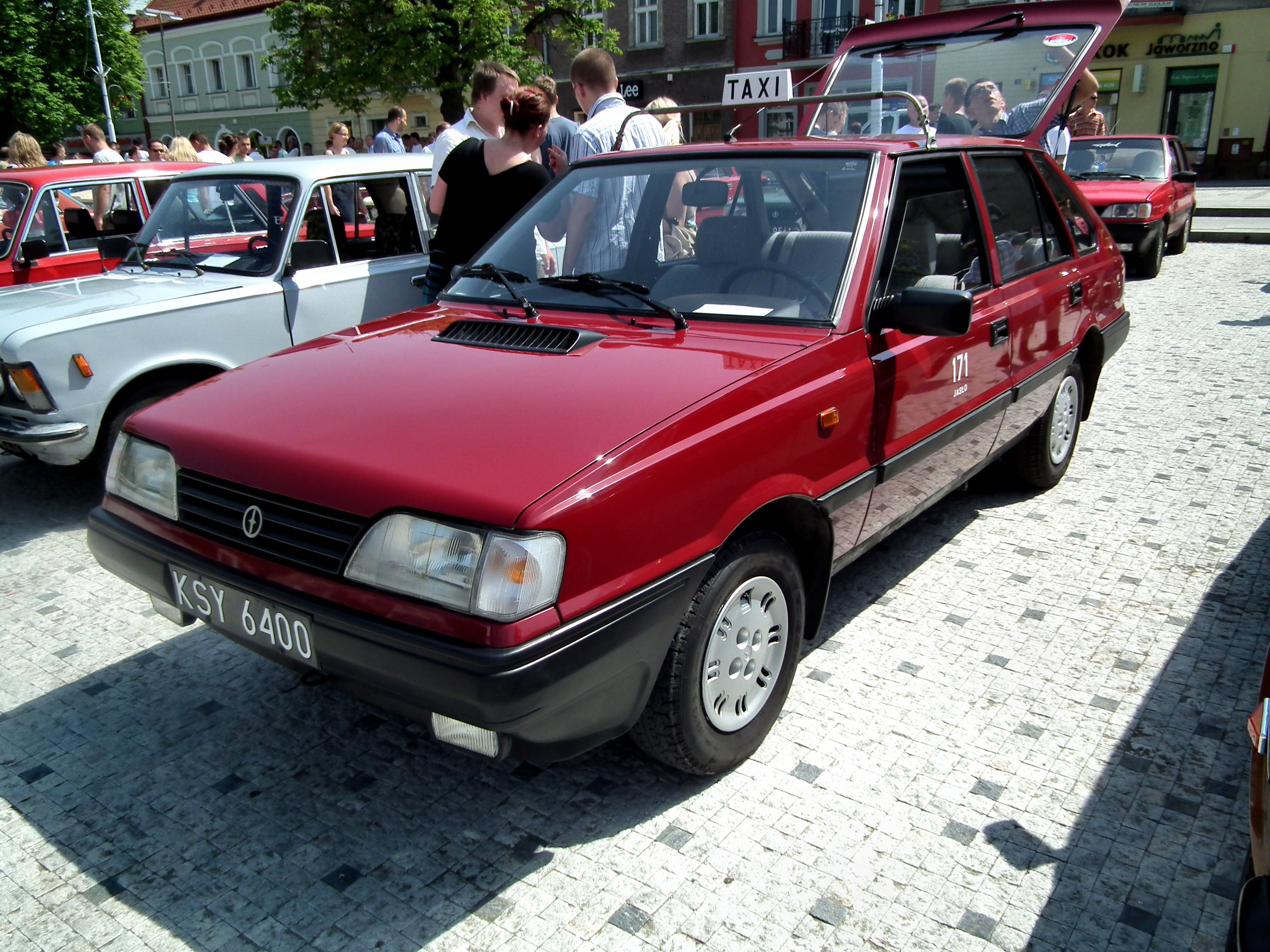
FSO Polonez Caro (1991–1993 design)

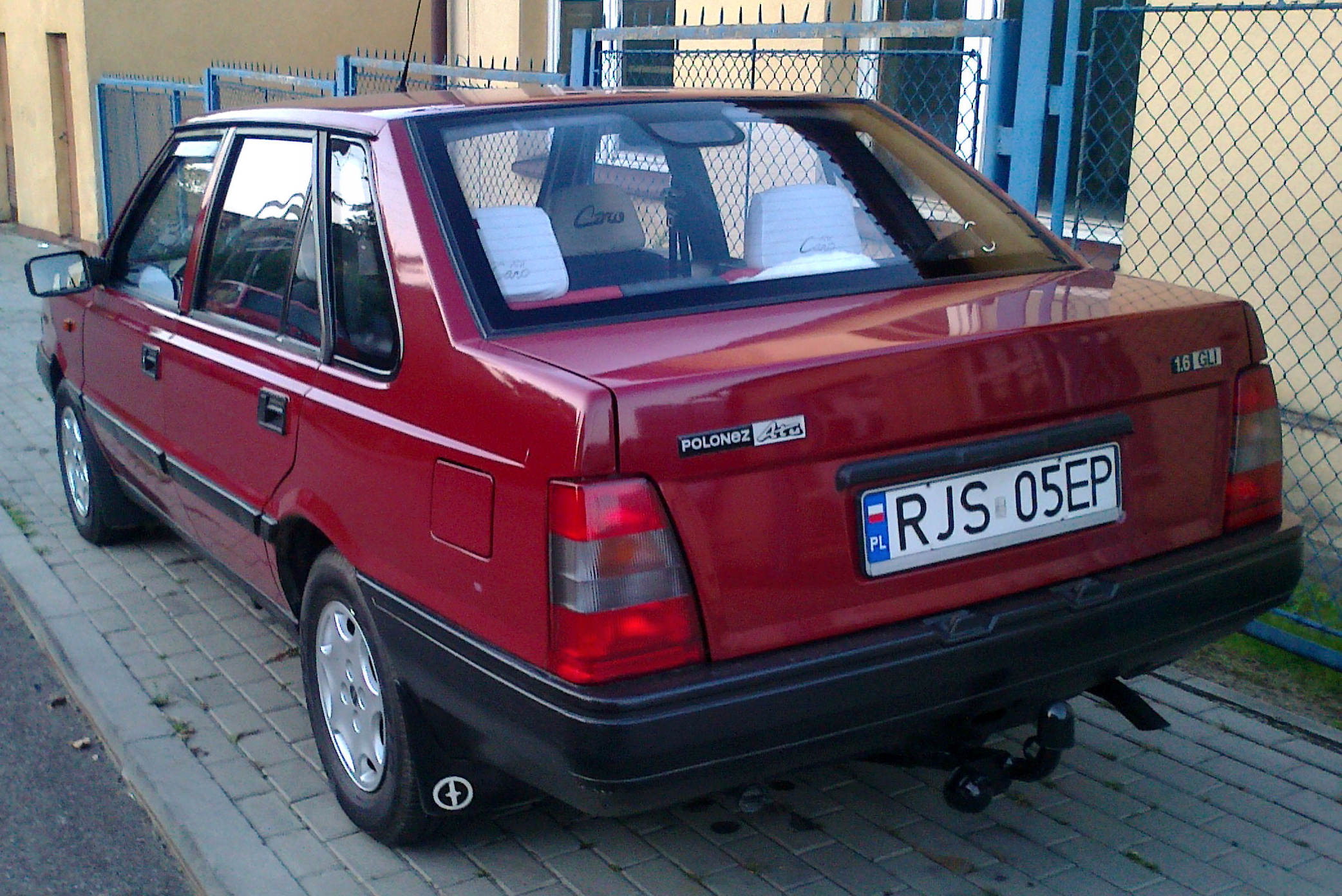
FSO Polonez Atu (rear view)

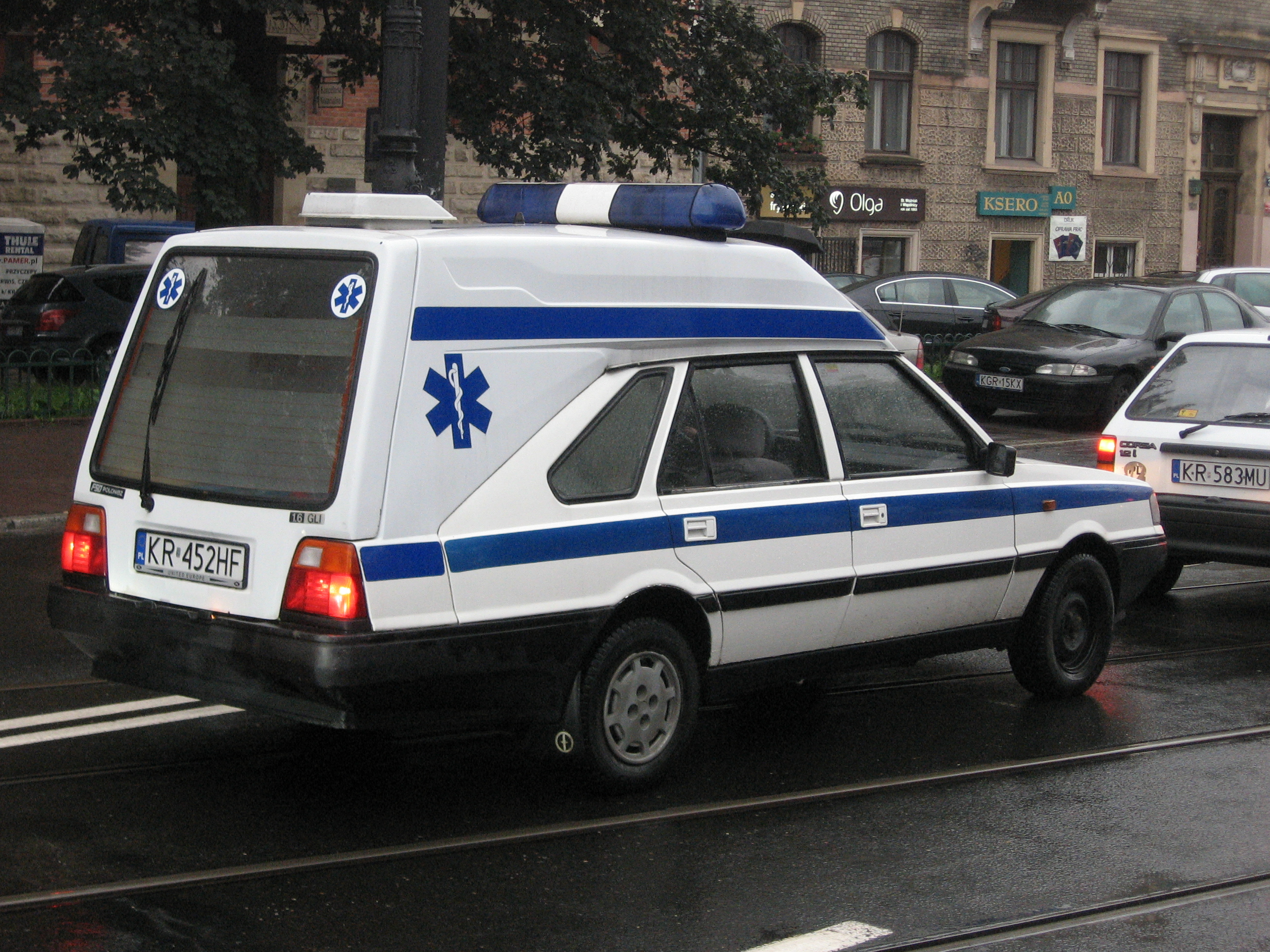
FSO Polonez Cargo ambulance

== Polonez Caro Plus (1997–2003) ==
FSO Polonez Caro Plus
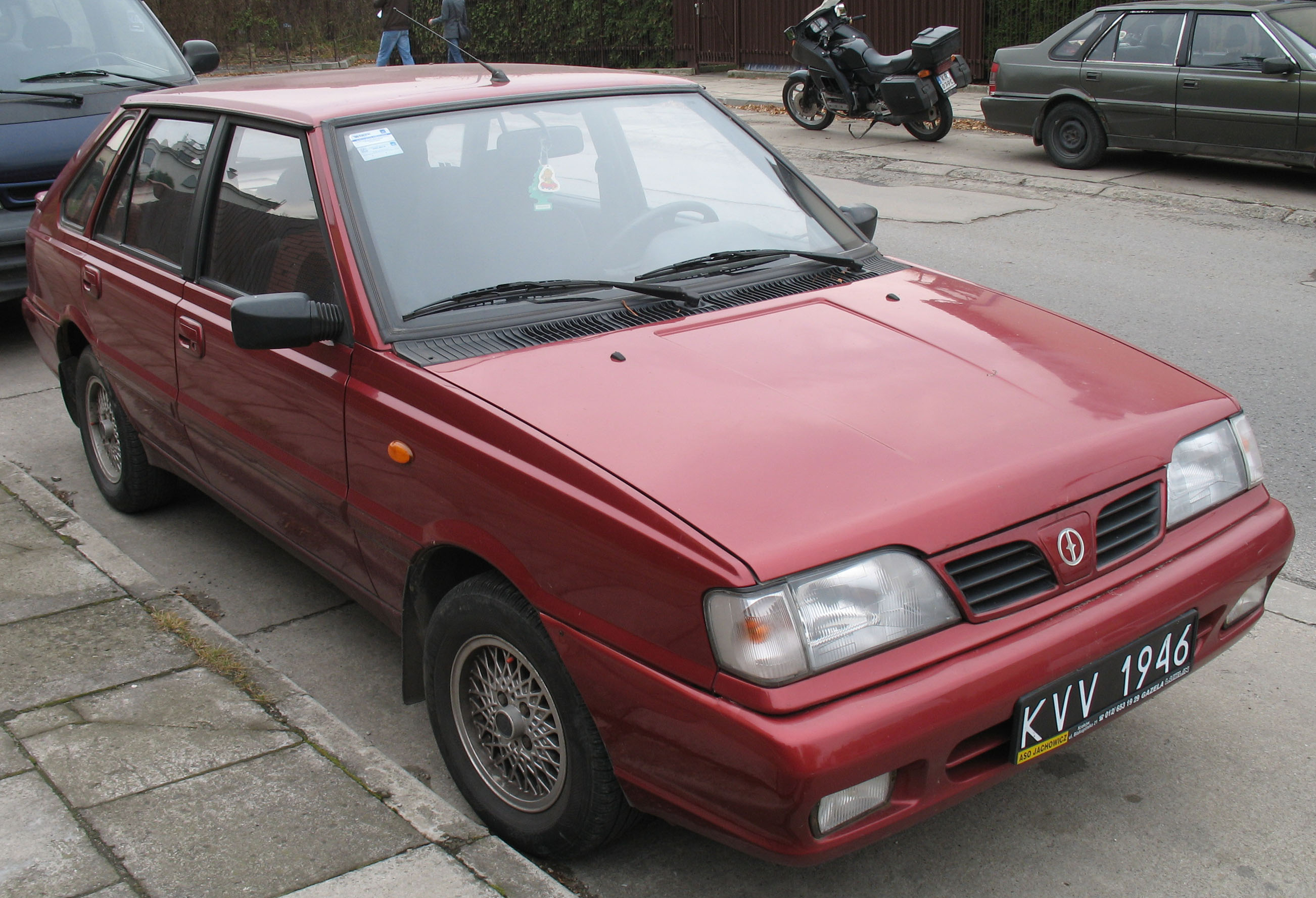

Overview
- Manufacturer: Daewoo-FSO
- Also called: Daewoo Truck Plus (Italy)
- Production: 1997–2002; 1997–2003 (pickup)
- Assembly: Poland: Warsaw; Poland: Nysa

Body and chassis
- Class: Large family car
- Body style: 5-door hatchback (1997–2002); 4-door sedan (1997–2002); 5-door station wagon (1999–2002); 2-door pickup (1997–2003); 2-door pickup (extended cab) (1997–2003); 4-door pickup (1997–2003); 5-door LAV (1997–2001)
- Layout: FR layout

Powertrain
- Engine: 1.4 L DOHC K16 I4; 1.6 L OHV I4; 1.9 L XUD9A diesel I4 (pickup)
- Transmission: 5-speed manual

Dimensions
- Wheelbase: 2,509–3,116 mm (98.8–122.7 in)
- Length: 4,369 mm (172.0 in); 4,616 mm (181.7 in) (station wagon/van and pickup); 5,000 mm (196.9 in) (extended cab pickup); 5,300 mm (208.7 in) (double cab pickup)
- Width: 1,650 mm (65.0 in)
- Height: 1,420 mm (55.9 in)
- Curb weight: 1,120 kg (2,470 lb)-1,170 kg (2,580 lb)

Chronology
- Predecessor: FSO Polonez Caro

- 1997 (March) FSO Polonez mass production of the new Caro Plus and Atu Plus - the new front grille, bumpers, new dashboard. (summer)

(December) FSO Polonez Caro Plus and Atu Plus 1.6 GSI - with Delphi (Multec XM) multi-point fuel injection, 1598 cc 62 kW (84 PS), 130 N⋅m (96 lb⋅ft), circa 155 km/h (96 mph) top speed, new door handles introduced.

- 1998 (May) The first public show of the station wagon prototype: FSO Polonez Kombi Plus.

FSO Truck was marketed in Italy by the Daewoo dealer network.

- 1999 (February) The test production of the new Daewoo-FSO Polonez Kombi 1.6 GSi MPI. (April) The mass production of the Daewoo-FSO Polonez Kombi in passenger (final drive ratio 3.9) and van versions (final drive ratio 4.3) with 1.6 engine (MPI). The new steering wheel (borrowed from the Daewoo Nubira) and armrests were introduced. The start of marketing was planned for June 1999. In May was the Official premiere of the Daewoo-FSO Polonez Kombi 1.6 GSi MPI at the Poznan Motor Show.
- 2000 The new shape of the FSO label in the front grille. (summer) Approximately 200 cars were produced with air conditioning, sold in summer months for an extra zl 1,200 (alloy wheels included).
- 2001 (summer) Another small series of Polonez with air conditioning, sold in summer months for an extra zl 1,000.
- 2002 (the end of the first quarter) The last passenger FSO Polonez car leaves the assembly line. Production was meant to be stopped only temporarily. Daewoo-FSO did not hold an official ceremony at the end of Polonez production.
- 2003 end of production Truck Plus.
- 2004 a new company, Polska Fabryka Samochodów (PFS) tried to restart Polonez Truck production, renaming it Poltruck (meant to have a modified body, to be introduced a bit later). The venture failed, leaving only a small number of test vehicles.

=== Engines ===
Model	Engine	Displacement	Valvetrain	Fuel system	Max. power at rpm	Max. torque at rpm	Top speed	Years
Petrol engines
1.4 GTI	K16	1398 cc	OHC 16v	Multi-point fuel injection	103 PS (76 kW; 102 hp) at 6000 rpm	127 N⋅m (94 lb⋅ft) at 5000 rpm	176 km/h (109 mph)	1997–1998
1.6 GLI	AB	1581 cc	OHV 8v	Single-point fuel injection	76 PS (56 kW; 75 hp) at 5000 rpm	121 N⋅m (89 lb⋅ft) at 3600 rpm	155 km/h (96 mph)	1997–2002
1.6 GSI	AF	1581 cc	OHV 8v	Multi-point fuel injection	84 PS (62 kW; 83 hp) at 5000 rpm	130 N⋅m (96 lb⋅ft) at 3800 rpm	166 km/h (103 mph)	1998–2002

=== Gallery ===
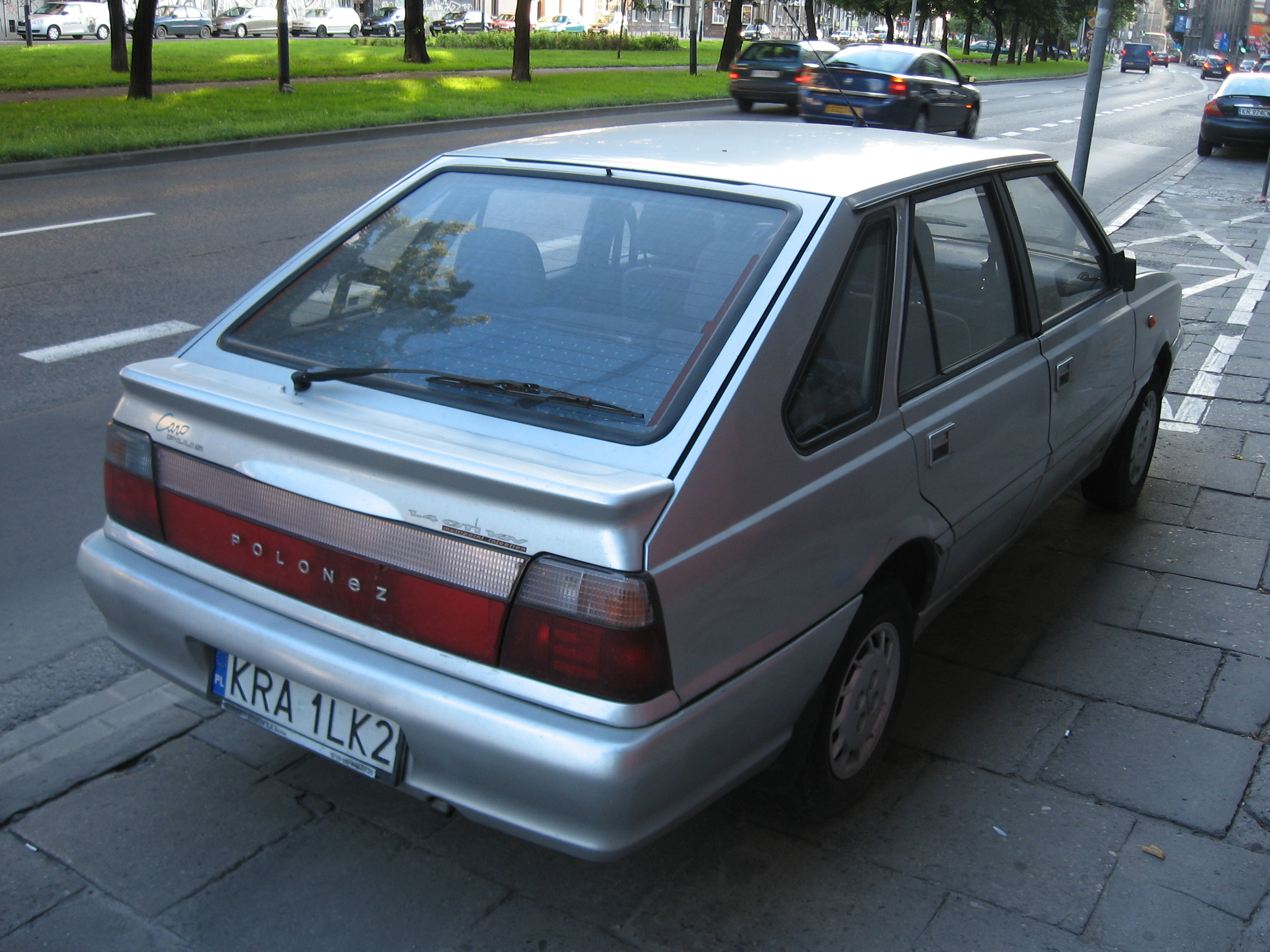
Caro Plus

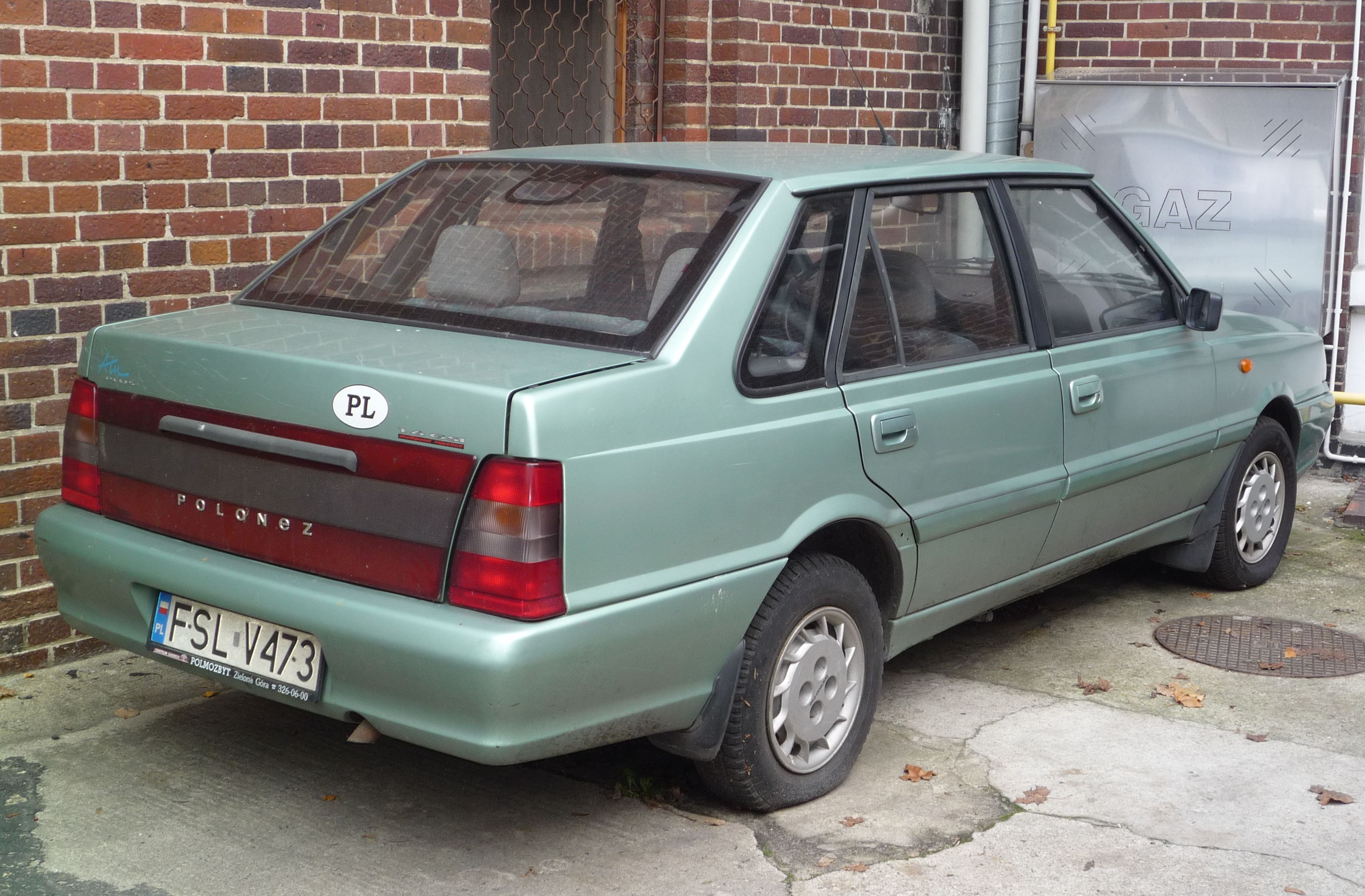
Atu Plus

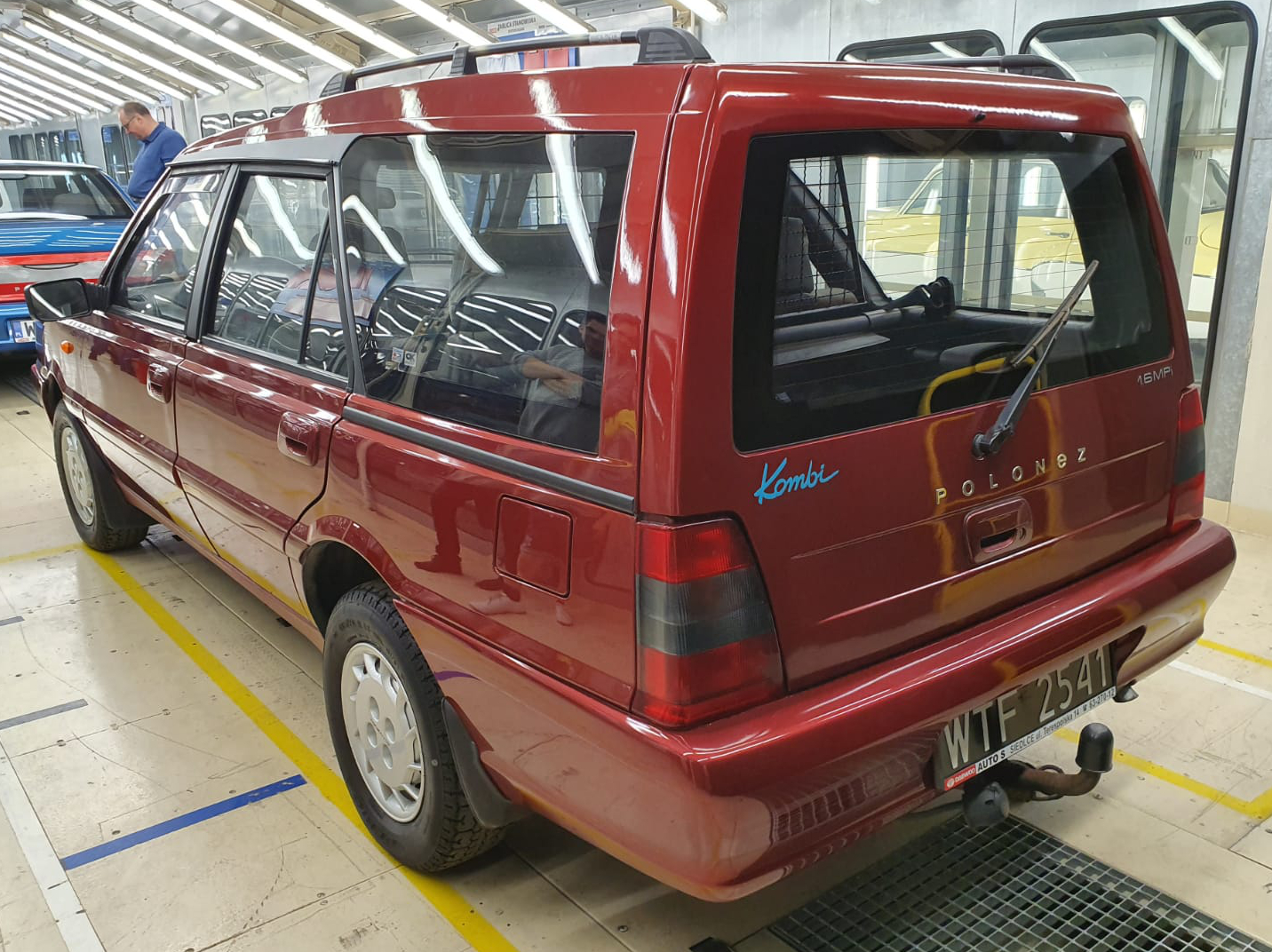
Kombi

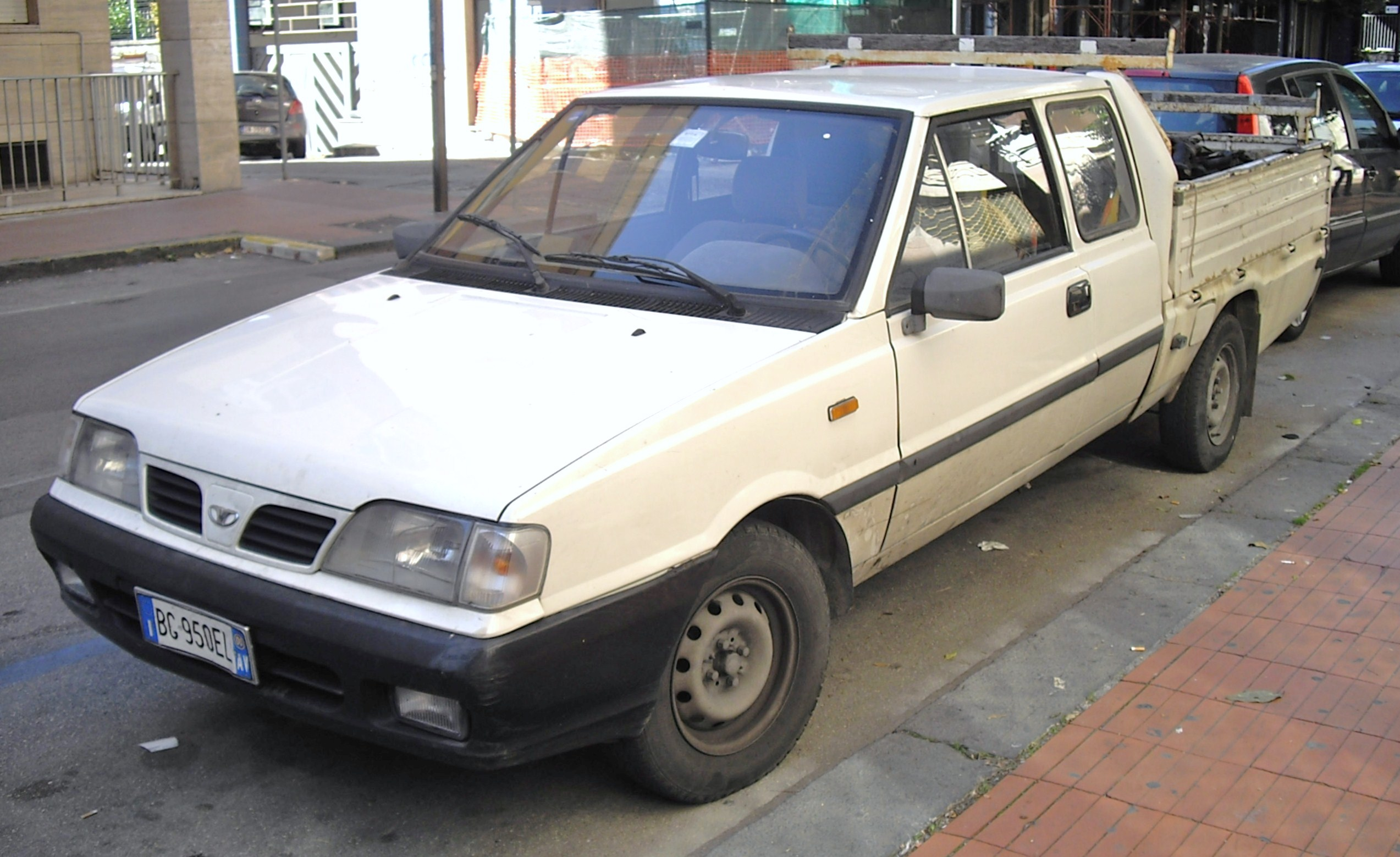
Daewoo Truck Plus in Italy

== Polonez range ==
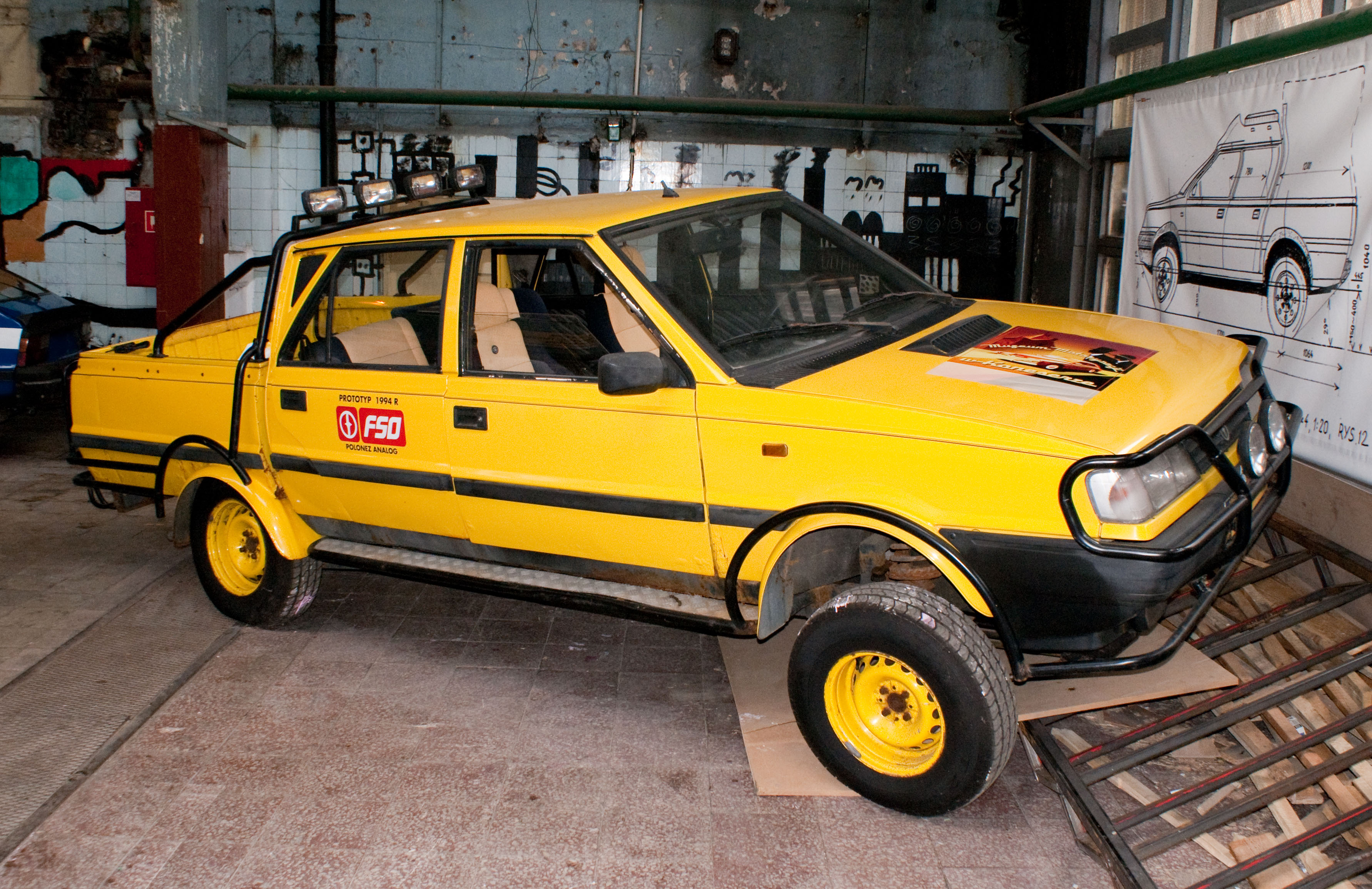
FSO Polonez Analog 4x4 prototype

The Polonez range was expanded to encompass a wide range of bodies. These included:

- Hatchback (as initially introduced)
- Sedan (FSO Polonez Atu, also known as FSO Celina on some export markets) introduced in 1996 (first presented in 1994)
- Station wagon introduced in 1999 (first presented in 1994)
- Pick-up called Truck (introduced in 1988)
- Extended Pick-up (with small rear seats)
- Truck Roy (long body like Caro/Atu but in pick-up form) (introduced around 1997)
- Special-bodied service vehicle
- Special edition for the Polish Fire Brigade
- Cargo LAV (Polonez Caro with a higher roof and longer rear part made of PVC put on metal crates - this body is what the Ambulance was built on) introduced around 1993
- Coupé (three door, about 50 made, side doors and B pillar are wider, C pillar is different)
- Three door (like normal Polonez but without rear doors; it is estimated that 300 were made)

There were also many prototypes, including a pickup made using the rear part of Polski Fiat 125p pick-up, chassis cab (without frame in the rear), 4x4 off-roader (Analog), hydro-pneumatic suspension, another sedan version (very different from Atu/Celina), 4x4 Truck w/o offroad suspension and van.

== Export markets ==
In total, FSO total exported 226,966 cars to foreign markets, with China, UK, Egypt, and France being the main takers.

Complete knock down (CKD) cars were assembled by El Nasr (in conjunction with Arab American Vehicles) in Egypt from 1983 until 1993, succeeding the locally assembled 125p in that market. In some countries, the FSO Polonez was sold as Celina, Prima, Mistral, Piedra, Atou.

Imports to the UK ceased in 1997, though sales continued in some parts of Western Europe - including France - for at least a year afterward. They were withdrawn from those markets due to more stringent emissions requirements and declining demand.

=== Dongfanghong ===
In China, Polonez-based derivatives were produced by YTO Group as the Dongfanghong and Yituo. They were released with station wagon (LT5021) and sedan (LT5022) bodywork, though with many modifications. Trim pieces came from the Volkswagen Santana and were powered by locally produced engines, a carburetted 1.5-litre inline-four from Beijing Engine Factory. These cars were built with locally made spare parts for imported Polonez, which were common in China then. Nevertheless, many other local parts were substituted (Dongfanghong was also working with Fiat at the time on tractor technology, which may have also influenced the choice of a car). A sales advantage for the vehicles was that their parts were easily interchangeable with Polonez. These cars were not nearly as successful as their actual Polonez counterparts.

== Legacy ==
The FSO Polonez suffered from relatively poor performance (except for those models equipped with the Fiat 2.0 DOHC, the Ford 2.0 SOHC, or the Rover 1.4 MPI 16V). Polonez parts were relatively cheap and readily available. After 1992, quality began to increase, especially after 1995 when Daewoo started cooperating with FSO. Since 1997, the last production models (the PLUS series) offered new features such as air conditioning.

Production ended in 2002, after 24 years. The relatively low price of the Polonez was seen as the main advantage over other cars. But demand slumped, and the last versions of the Polonez produced were the Truck versions, valued for their low price, reliability, and high load capability: up to 1,000 kg (2,205 lb) depending on the version.

The Polonez was a common sight in Central and Eastern Europe, particularly in its home country of Poland. Once Poland became a member of the European Union on 1 May 2004, the car was rapidly replaced by cheap and tax-free used cars from Western Europe.

The Polonez has been a popular choice for participants in the Złombol Charity Rally. In 2018, around 300 teams, or approximately 40% of all racers, used versions of the Polonez in this event.
