= FSO Polonez 2000 Rally =

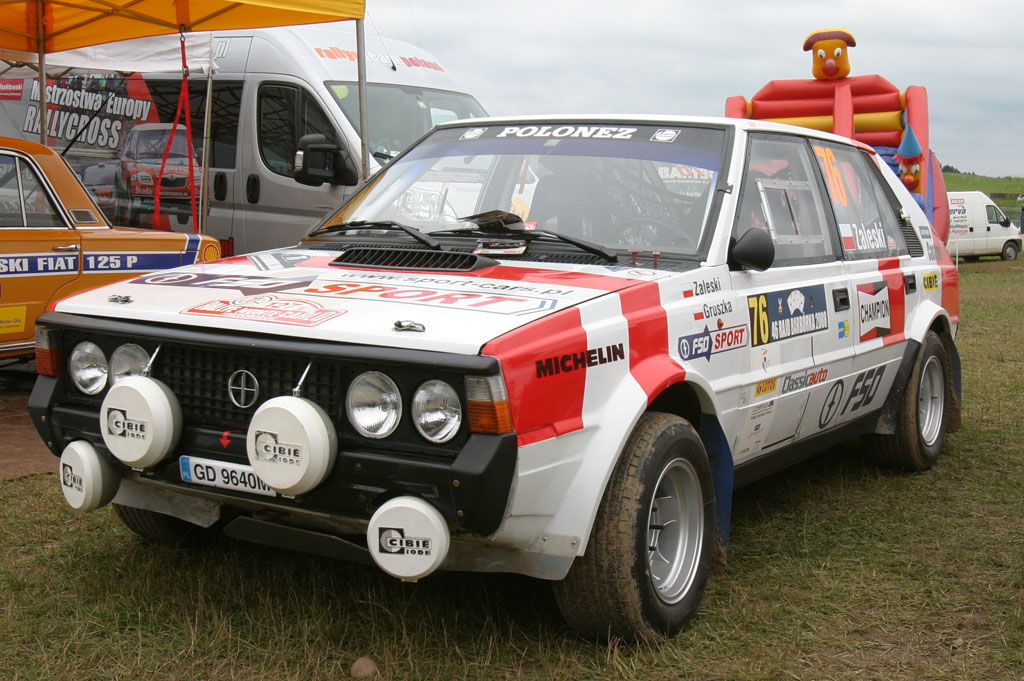

Overview
- Manufacturer: FSO OBRSO
- Production: 1978-1986
- Assembly: Warsaw, Poland

Body and chassis
- Class: Rally car
- Body style: 5-door hatchback
- Layout: FR layout

Powertrain
- Engine: DOHC R4
- Transmission: 5-speed manual production Colotti

Chronology
- Predecessor: Polski Fiat 125p 1600 Monte Carlo Polski Fiat 125p 1800 Akropolis

FSO Polonez 2000 Rally is a Polish rally car produced by the FSO and OBRSO in Warsaw, Communist Poland. It was first created in 1978 following the release of its production counterpart: the FSO Polonez. It competed in Group IV, Group II, Group B, and other events.

== FSO Polonez 2000 Group IV ==
The racing history of the Polonez begins in 1978. It first competed at multiple sports events as a demonstration car until it was granted homologation into Group IV rallying on January 1, 1979.

The body of the car was slimmed down and inside was a roll cage barely meeting the minimum approval. The car did not have side skirts, the body panels were made of metal, and the hood was stripped of its reinforcements.. Corrosion protection covers were used instead of extensions and the car had Cromodora wheels and mirrors . A Cibie battery pack was attached to the front. The car had bayflex bumpers with holes cut out to reduce the weight of the vehicle. It was fitted with additional rallying equipment to meet the regulations. The vehicle had a fuel tank with a capacity of 72 liters. The car was driven on a modified 2.0 DOHC engine that had four Weber carburetors, one for each cylinder or mechanical injection. It achieved 170/185 hp. The car used a metal clutch, a Colotti claw gearbox in five gear ratios, and limited slip rear axle. The rear axle was strengthened with a Panhard rod. The suspension sat on uniballs and Bilstein shock absorbers. The car used a brake system from a Porsche 911 RS with 254mm ventilated discs.

== Walter Wolf Racing ==
After receiving approval for Group IV, the car was officially sponsored by Walter Wolf Racing and competed in a deep blue livery with a red stripe on the side of the body. One of the Polonez Walter Wolf Racing cars was exported to Canada.

== FSO Polonez 2000 Group II ==
On April 1, 1980, Polonez received approval for Group II. The deep blue and red livery of Walter Wolf Racing disappeared in favor of the national colors. So, the car was styled with a white body and red stripe on the side. The Cromodora rims changed to ATS forged magnesium rims. The vehicle only used carburetor engines and received laminated flaps, fenders and door trim. The car had fiberglass extensions, a VDO dashboard and Vitaloni mirrors. Cibie headlights mounted in the usual configuration or in line with the bumper. With this car, the crew of Maciej Stawowiak and Ryszard Żyszkowski scored in the general classification of the WRC during the rally Portugal in 1980.

== FSO Polonez 2000 Group B ==
On April 1, 1984, Polonez received approval for Group B . The car used carburetors, mechanical injection and electronic injection. Polycarbonate side windows were used, small steel bumpers from the standard Polonez C. Front spoilers with air stream blades were mounted, which directed the air to the cut out inlets under the bumper to cool the brakes. The chrome accessories and rubber dart from the front bonnet were removed from the Polonez. This Polonez had about 210 horsepower. Yellow varnish with dark blue quadrangles and stripes was used, i.e. FSO Sport painting. In the early 90s, FSO Sport and OBRSO withdrew from rallying. All copies were reportedly dismantled and sold for parts. Today you can only find replicas of rally Polonez's.

== Technical data ==
=== Engine and transmission ===
- DOHC four-cylinder engine, transversely mounted at the front with oil cooler (from Fiat 132 - Fiat Twin Cam)
- Displacement - 1995 cm³
- Maximum power - 191 hp at 6,900 rpm
- Maximum torque - 229 Nm at 6100 rpm
- Valves - 8 (2 per cylinder)
- Fuel supply - 2 Weber IDF double carburetors, 48 mm throat
- Intake - K&N sports air filter
- Exhaust - 4-2-1 exhaust manifold, diameter 50 mm, only middle silencer
- Clutch - dry single disc from Sachs with a diameter of 215 mm
- Transmission - 5-speed Colotti dog-leg
- Rear axle - supported by a Panhard rod and additional reinforcement
- Limited Slip Differential - Colotti Coppia Frenata, pre-short circuit 40%
- Rear-wheel drive via propeller shaft and rear axle

=== Chassis ===
- Front suspension - Bilstein spring shock absorbers
- Rear suspension - spring trzypiórowy store flat and Bilstein shock absorbers
- Front brakes - 256 mm diameter brakes (from Porsche 911 RS)
- Rear brakes - standard
- Hand brake - hydraulic based on the clutch pump from Fiat 125p
- Wheels - 13 inch ATS alloy wheels with a width of 8 inches
- Tires - Original Michelin, Uniroyal, Dunlop

=== Bodywork ===
Type - five - door hatchback

- Length / width / height - 4320/1650/1420 mm
- Wheelbase - 2510 mm
- Battery - moved back to the luggage compartment
- Fuel tank - 72 l

=== Dynamics ===
- Acceleration 0–100 km / h - approx. 5-6 s
