= YTO Group =

Chinese tractor manufacturing company

YTO Group Corporation
- Native name: 中国一拖集团有限公司
- Company type: Subsidiary
- Industry: Agricultural machinery Heavy equipment Automotive
- Predecessor: China First Tractor Company
- Founded: 1955
- Headquarters: Luoyang, Henan, China
- Area served: Worldwide
- Products: Tractors; Combine harvesters Construction Machinery; Trucks; Diesel engines
- Parent: Sinomach
- Website: YTO China; YTO Global

The YTO Group Corporation is a Chinese agricultural machinery and construction machinery manufacturer part of Sinomach, a comprehensive machinery conglomerate. Although composed of many subsidiaries and divisions, the company is best known for manufacturing a range of farming products including tractors and combine harvesters. The company was founded in 1955 and become the largest manufacturer of tractors in China. The company also manufactures construction machinery trucks and diesel engines.

== History ==
Prior to using the YTO brand, the tractors and engines were marketed under the brand Dongfanghong (DFH; Chinese: 东方红; pinyin: Dōng Fāng Hóng; lit. 'Red of the East'). In the 1980s and 1990s, Fiat began to assist First Tractor Company with technology for engines and tractors.

In 2005, AGCO announced they were in discussions with First Tractor Company to establish a joint venture to manufacture tractors between 40 and 100 horsepower although the joint venture never materialized.

The company has been keen on making a presence in international markets through establishing overseas factories and sales networks. In March 2013, the company scored a large export order from Ethiopia with a $100 million purchase of tractors.

== Products ==
- Agricultural Machinery
  - Wheeled Tractor
  - Crawler Tractor
  - Combine Harvester
  - Implement & Attachment
- Construction Machinery
  - Road Roller
  - Wheeled Loader
  - Motor Grader
  - Crawler Excavator
  - Bulldozer
  - Forklift Truck
  - Garbage Compactor
  - Road Paver
  - Road Recycler
  - Concrete Mixing Plant
  - Asphalt Mixing Plant
  - Drilling Rig
  - Mobile Power Station
- Vehicle
  - Mining Dump Truck
  - Pickup Truck
  - Special purpose Vehicles
- Diesel Engine & OEM Parts
  - Diesel Engine
  - OEM Parts

== Models ==
=== Agricultural Tractors ===
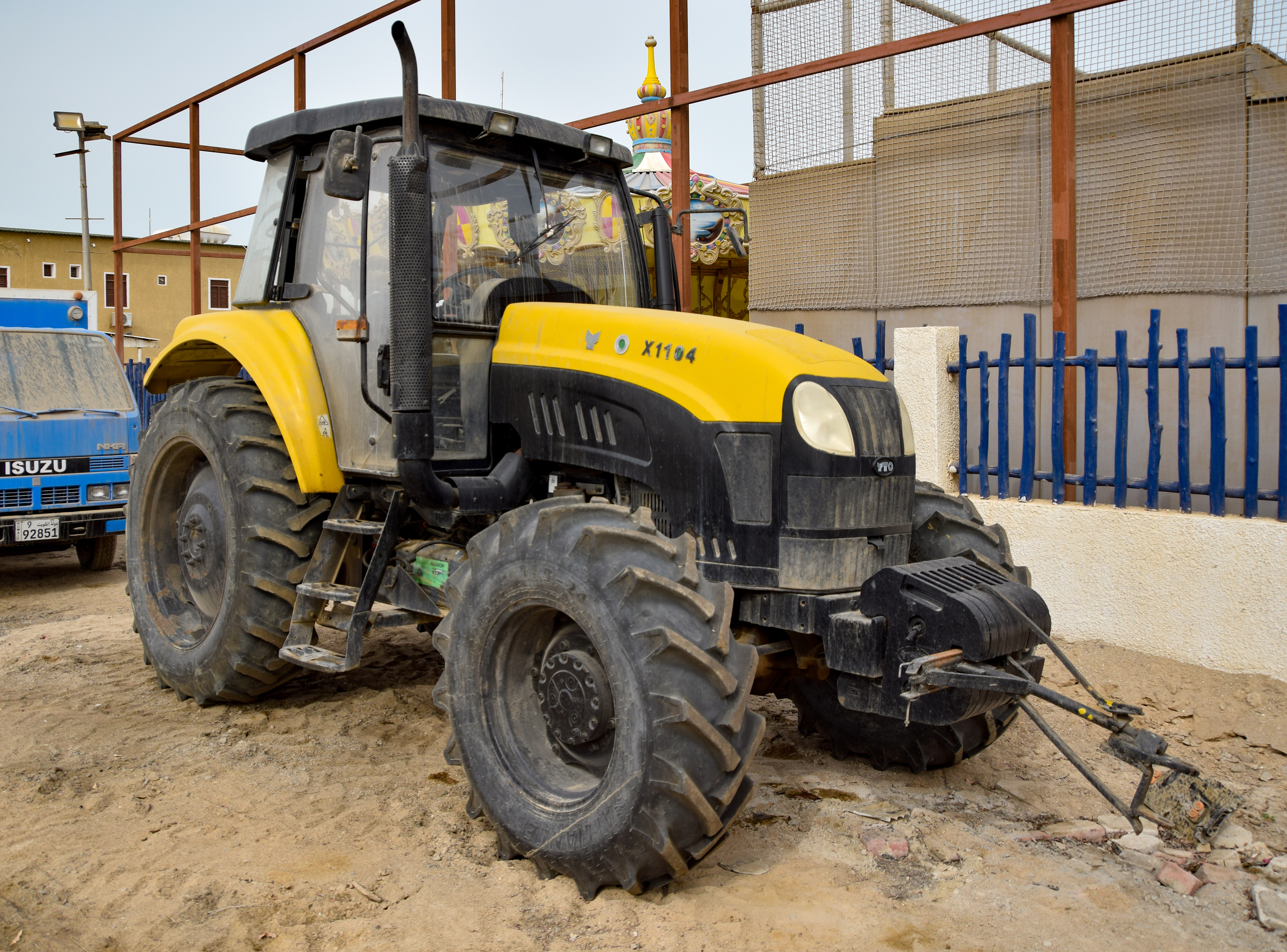
A YTO X1104 tractor in Kuwait

==== YTO Brand ====
YTO Tractor Models
Model	Year(s) of Production	Horsepower	Engine Type	Misc Notes	Photo
YTO 100-90	2000s	100 hp (75 kW)		Fiat design	
YTO 110-90	2000s			Fiat design	
YTO 170	2000s	17 hp (13 kW)			
YTO 180	2000s	18 hp (13 kW)			
YTO 200	2000s	20 hp (15 kW)			
YTO 200P	2000s	20 hp (15 kW)			
YTO 200PD	2000s	20 hp (15 kW)			
YTO 204P	2000s	20 hp (15 kW)			
YTO 204PD	2000s	20 hp (15 kW)			
YTO 220PD	2000s	22 hp (16 kW)			
YTO 240P	2000s	24 hp (18 kW)			
YTO 240PD	2000s	24 hp (18 kW)			
YTO 244PD	2000s	24 hp (18 kW)			
YTO 250	2000s	25 hp (19 kW)			
YTO 260P	2000s	26 hp (19 kW)			
YTO 280P	2000s	28 hp (21 kW)			
YTO 284PD	2000s	28 hp (21 kW)			
YTO 300	2000s	30 hp (22 kW)			
YTO 300-1	2000s	30 hp (22 kW)			
YTO 304	2000s	30 hp (22 kW)			
YTO 320	2000s	32 hp (24 kW)			
YTO 324	2000s	32 hp (24 kW)			
YTO 350	2000s	35 hp (26 kW)			
YTO 354	2000s	35 hp (26 kW)			
YTO 400	2000s	40 hp (30 kW)			
YTO 404	2000s	40 hp (30 kW)			
YTO 450	2000s	45 hp (34 kW)			
YTO 454	2000s	45 hp (34 kW)			
YTO 454 Reverse	2000s	45 hp (34 kW)			
YTO 500	2000s	50 hp (37 kW)			
YTO 504	2000s	50 hp (37 kW)			
YTO 520	2000s	52 hp (39 kW)			
YTO 524	2000s	52 hp (39 kW)			
YTO 550	2000s	55 hp (41 kW)			
YTO 554	2000s	55 hp (41 kW)			
YTO 600	2000s	60 hp (45 kW)			
YTO 604	2000s	60 hp (45 kW)			
YTO 654	2000s	65 hp (48 kW)			
YTO 700	2000s	70 hp (52 kW)			
YTO 702S crawler	2000s	70 hp (52 kW)			
YTO 70T1 crawler	2000s	70 hp (52 kW)			
YTO 75DTX crawler	2000s	75 hp (56 kW)			
YTO 802K crawler	2000s	80 hp (60 kW)			
YTO 802Q5 crawler	2000s	80 hp (60 kW)			
YTO 802RT crawler	2000s	80 hp (60 kW)			
YTO 802W crawler w/backhoe	2000s	80 hp (60 kW)			
YTO 1002 crawler	2000s	100 hp (75 kW)			
YTO 1204	2000s	120 hp (89 kW)		Fiat design	
YTO 1604	2000s	160 hp (120 kW)			
YTO 1804	2000s	180 hp (130 kW)			
YTO 1884	2000s	184 hp (137 kW)			
YTO 2884	2000s				
YTO C402 crawler	2000s	40 hp (30 kW)			
YTO C502 crawler	2000s	50 hp (37 kW)			
YTO C602 crawler	2000s	60 hp (45 kW)			
YTO C702 crawler	2000s	70 hp (52 kW)			
YTO C702-A crawler	2000s	70 hp (52 kW)			
YTO C802 crawler	2000s	80 hp (60 kW)			
YTO C802-A crawler	2000s	80 hp (60 kW)			
YTO C902 crawler	2000s	90 hp (67 kW)			
YTO C902-1 crawler	2000s	90 hp (67 kW)			
YTO C902-2 crawler	2000s	90 hp (67 kW)			
YTO C902-A crawler	2000s	90 hp (67 kW)			
YTO C1002 crawler	2000s	100 hp (75 kW)			
YTO C1002-1 crawler	2000s	100 hp (75 kW)			
YTO C1202 crawler	2000s	120 hp (89 kW)			
YTO C1302 crawler	2000s	130 hp (97 kW)			
YTO C1304	2000s	130 hp (97 kW)			
YTO C1402 crawler	2000s	140 hp (100 kW)			
YTO C1602E crawler	2000s	160 hp (120 kW)			
YTO CA702 crawler	2000s	70 hp (52 kW)			
YTO CA802 crawler	2000s	80 hp (60 kW)			
YTO CA802-1 crawler	2000s	80 hp (60 kW)			
YTO CA902 crawler	2000s	90 hp (67 kW)			
YTO CA902-1 crawler	2000s	90 hp (67 kW)			
YTO DFH 300	2000s	30 hp (22 kW)			
YTO LF80-90	2000s	80 hp (60 kW)			
YTO LG1404	2000s	140 hp (100 kW)			
YTO LG1504	2000s	150 hp (110 kW)			
YTO LX600	2000s	60 hp (45 kW)			
YTO LX604	2000s	60 hp (45 kW)			
YTO LX650	2000s	65 hp (48 kW)			
YTO LX654	2000s	65 hp (48 kW)			
YTO LX700	2000s	70 hp (52 kW)			
YTO LX704	2000s	70 hp (52 kW)			
YTO LX750	2000s	75 hp (56 kW)			
YTO LX750H High-Crop	2000s	75 hp (56 kW)			
YTO LX754	2000s	75 hp (56 kW)			
YTO LX800	2000s	80 hp (60 kW)			
YTO LX804	2000s	80 hp (60 kW)			
YTO LX850	2000s	85 hp (63 kW)			
YTO LX854	2000s	85 hp (63 kW)			
YTO LX900	2000s	90 hp (67 kW)			
YTO LX900H High-Crop	2000s	90 hp (67 kW)			
YTO LX904	2000s	90 hp (67 kW)			
YTO LX904C	2000s	90 hp (67 kW)			
YTO LX950	2000s	95 hp (71 kW)			
YTO LX954	2000s	95 hp (71 kW)			
YTO LX1000	2000s	100 hp (75 kW)			
YTO LX2004	2000s	200 hp (150 kW)			
YTO ME280	2000s	28 hp (21 kW)			
YTO ME284	2000s	28 hp (21 kW)			
YTO ME300	2000s	30 hp (22 kW)			
YTO ME304	2000s	30 hp (22 kW)			
YTO ME320	2000s	32 hp (24 kW)			
YTO ME324	2000s	32 hp (24 kW)			
YTO ME350	2000s	35 hp (26 kW)			
YTO ME350H High-Crop	2000s	35 hp (26 kW)			
YTO ME354	2000s	35 hp (26 kW)			
YTO ME400	2000s	40 hp (30 kW)			
YTO ME400H High-Crop	2000s	40 hp (30 kW)			
YTO ME404	2000s	40 hp (30 kW)			
YTO MF400	2000s	40 hp (30 kW)			
YTO MF404	2000s	40 hp (30 kW)			
YTO MF450	2000s	45 hp (34 kW)			
YTO MF454	2000s	45 hp (34 kW)			
YTO MF500	2000s	50 hp (37 kW)			
YTO MF504	2000s	50 hp (37 kW)			
YTO MF550	2000s	55 hp (41 kW)			
YTO MF554	2000s	55 hp (41 kW)			
YTO MF600	2000s	60 hp (45 kW)			
YTO MF604	2000s	60 hp (45 kW)			
YTO MG600	2000s	60 hp (45 kW)			
YTO MG604	2000s	60 hp (45 kW)			
YTO MG650	2000s	65 hp (48 kW)			
YTO MG654	2000s	65 hp (48 kW)			
YTO MG700	2000s	70 hp (52 kW)			
YTO MG704	2000s	70 hp (52 kW)			
YTO MG750	2000s	75 hp (56 kW)			
YTO MG754	2000s	75 hp (56 kW)			
YTO MS250	2000s	25 hp (19 kW)			
YTO MS254	2000s	25 hp (19 kW)			
YTO MS280	2000s	28 hp (21 kW)			
YTO MS284	2000s	28 hp (21 kW)			
YTO MS300	2000s	30 hp (22 kW)			
YTO MS300-1	2000s	30 hp (22 kW)			
YTO MS304	2000s	30 hp (22 kW)			
YTO MS350	2000s	35 hp (26 kW)			
YTO MS354	2000s	35 hp (26 kW)			
YTO Rabtrak	2000s	18 hp (13 kW)			
YTO SA250	2000s	25 hp (19 kW)			
YTO SA254	2000s	25 hp (19 kW)			
YTO SA280	2000s	28 hp (21 kW)			
YTO SA284	2000s	28 hp (21 kW)			
YTO SE250	2000s	25 hp (19 kW)			
YTO SG184	2000s	18 hp (13 kW)			
YTO SG204	2000s	20 hp (15 kW)			
YTO SG250	2000s	25 hp (19 kW)			
YTO SG254	2000s	5 hp (3.7 kW)			
YTO SG280	2000s	28 hp (21 kW)			
YTO SG284	2000s	28 hp (21 kW)			
YTO SG300	2000s	30 hp (22 kW)			
YTO SG304	2000s	30 hp (22 kW)			
YTO T80 crawler	2000s	81 hp (60 kW)	YTO engine		
YTO T100G crawler	2000s	100 hp (75 kW)	DFH engine		
YTO T100G-II crawler	2000s	100 hp (75 kW)	DFH engine		
YTO T120N crawler	2000s	120 hp (89 kW)			
YTO T140 crawler	2000s	156 hp (116 kW)	Shanghai engine		
YTO T140N crawler	2000s	140 hp (100 kW)			
YTO TD185Y crawler	2000s	185 hp (138 kW)	Shanghai engine		
YTO TD320Y-1 crawler	2000s	320 hp (240 kW)			
YTO TD410Y-1 crawler	2000s	410 hp (310 kW)			
YTO TDG140 crawler	2000s	140 hp (100 kW)	Shanghai engine		
YTO TDS220Y crawler	2000s	220 hp (160 kW)			
YTO TS80 crawler	2000s	80 hp (60 kW)			
YTO TS100 crawler	2000s	100 hp (75 kW)	DFH engine		
YTO TS120 crawler	2000s	120 hp (89 kW)			
YTO TSD165Y	2000s	165 hp (123 kW)	Shanghai engine		
YTO X700	2000s	70 hp (52 kW)			
YTO X704	2000s	70 hp (52 kW)			
YTO X724	2000s	72 hp (54 kW)			
YTO X750	2000s	75 hp (56 kW)			
YTO X754	2000s	75 hp (56 kW)			
YTO X800	2000s	80 hp (60 kW)			
YTO X804	2000s	80 hp (60 kW)			
YTO X824	2000s	82 hp (61 kW)			
YTO X850	2000s	85 hp (63 kW)			
YTO X854	2000s	85 hp (63 kW)			
YTO X864	2000s	86 hp (64 kW)			
YTO X900	2000s	90 hp (67 kW)			
YTO X904	2000s	90 hp (67 kW)			
YTO X1004	2000s	100 hp (75 kW)			
YTO X1104	2000s	110 hp (82 kW)			
YTO X1204	2000s	120 hp (89 kW)			
YTO X1254	2000s	125 hp (93 kW)		based on Fiat 120	
YTO X1304	2000s	130 hp (97 kW)			
YTO YD130 crawler	2000s	130 hp (97 kW)			
YTO YD160 crawler	2000s	160 hp (120 kW)			

==== Dongfanghong Brand ====
DongFangHong Tractor Models
Model	Year(s) of Production	Horsepower	Engine Type	Misc Notes	Photo
DongFangHong C402 crawler	2000s				
DongFangHong C502 crawler	2000s				
DongFangHong C602 crawler	2000s				
DongFangHong C702 crawler	2000s				
DongFangHong C802 crawler	2000s				
DongFangHong C902 crawler	2000s				
DongFangHong C1302 crawler	2000s				
DongFangHong CA702 crawler	2000s				
DongFangHong CA802 crawler	2000s				
DongFangHong CA902 crawler	2000s				
DongFangHong CU200D	2000s	20 hp (15 kW)			
DongFangHong DFH-70T1 crawler	2000s			Fiat design	
DongFangHong DFH-70TS crawler	2000s			Fiat design	
DongFangHong DFH-75DT crawler	2000s			Fiat design	
DongFangHong DFH-75DTX crawler	2000s			Fiat design	
DongFangHong 90	2000s			Fiat design	
DongFangHong DFH-90	2000s			Fiat design	
DongFangHong DFH-150	2000s	15 hp (11 kW)			
DongFangHong DFH-170	2000s	17 hp (13 kW)			
DongFangHong DFH-180	2000s	18 hp (13 kW)			
DongFangHong DFH-180	2000s	18 hp (13 kW)			
DongFangHong DFH-180P Farm-lord	2000s	18 hp (13 kW)			
DongFangHong DFH-200	2000s	20 hp (15 kW)			
DongFangHong DFH-200P	2000s	20 hp (15 kW)			
DongFangHong DFH-250	2000s	25 hp (19 kW)			
DongFangHong DFH-254	2000s	25 hp (19 kW)			
DongFangHong DFH-280	2000s	28 hp (21 kW)			
DongFangHong DFH-300	2000s	30 hp (22 kW)			
DongFangHong DFH-304	2000s	30 hp (22 kW)			
DongFangHong DFH-350	2000s	35 hp (26 kW)			
DongFangHong DFH-354	2000s	35 hp (26 kW)			
DongFangHong DFH-400	2000s	40 hp (30 kW)			
DongFangHong DFH-X400	2000s	40 hp (30 kW)			
DongFangHong DFH-404	2000s	40 hp (30 kW)			
DongFangHong DFH-404Z	2000s	40 hp (30 kW)			
DongFangHong DFH-450	2000s	45 hp (34 kW)			
DongFangHong DFH-500	2000s	50 hp (37 kW)			
DongFangHong DFH-504	2000s	50 hp (37 kW)			
DongFangHong DFH-550	2000s	55 hp (41 kW)			
DongFangHong DFH-550 (new style)	2000s	55 hp (41 kW)			
DongFangHong DFH-554	2000s	55 hp (41 kW)			
DongFangHong DFH-600	2000s	60 hp (45 kW)			
DongFangHong DFH-600 (new style)	2000s	60 hp (45 kW)			
DongFangHong DFH-604	2000s	60 hp (45 kW)			
DongFangHong DFH-650	2000s	65 hp (48 kW)			
DongFangHong DFH-654	2000s	65 hp (48 kW)			
DongFangHong DFH-X700S-1	2000s	70 hp (52 kW)			
DongFangHong DFH-X704	2000s	70 hp (52 kW)			
DongFangHong 750	2000s	75 hp (56 kW)			
DongFangHong DFH-X750	2000s	75 hp (56 kW)			
DongFangHong DFH-X754	2000s	75 hp (56 kW)			
DongFangHong DFH-X800	2000s	80 hp (60 kW)			
DongFangHong DFH-802 crawler	2000s	80 hp (60 kW)		Fiat design	
DongFangHong DFH-802K crawler	2000s	80 hp (60 kW)		Fiat design	
DongFangHong DFH-802KT crawler	2000s	80 hp (60 kW)		Fiat design	
DongFangHong DFH-802KTXS crawler	2000s	80 hp (60 kW)		Fiat design	
DongFangHong DFH-802RT crawler	2000s	80 hp (60 kW)		Fiat design	
DongFangHong DFH-X804	2000s	80 hp (60 kW)			
DongFangHong DFH-X854	2000s	85 hp (63 kW)			
DongFangHong DFH-902 crawler	2000s	90 hp (67 kW)		Fiat design	
DongFangHong DFH-904	2000s	90 hp (67 kW)		Fiat design	
DongFangHong DFH-X904	2000s	90 hp (67 kW)			
DongFangHong DFH-1000	2000s	100 hp (75 kW)		Fiat design	
DongFangHong DFH-1002 crawler	2000s	100 hp (75 kW)		Fiat design	
DongFangHong DFH-1004	2000s	100 hp (75 kW)		Fiat design; Valtra design	
DongFangHong 1004YZ	2000s	100 hp (75 kW)		Valtra design	
DongFangHong DFH-1202 crawler	2000s	120 hp (89 kW)		Fiat design	
DongFangHong 1202XR crawler	2000s				
DongFangHong DFH-1204	2000s	120 hp (89 kW)		Fiat design	
DongFangHong 1204YZ	2000s	120 hp (89 kW)		Valtra design	
DongFangHong X1254	2000s	120 hp (89 kW)			
DongFangHong DFH-1302R w/tracks	2000s				
DongFangHong 1604	2000s	160 hp (120 kW)			
DongFangHong DFH-1604	2000s	160 hp (120 kW)			
DongFangHong 1804	2000s	180 hp (130 kW)			
DongFangHong X1804	2000s	180 hp (130 kW)			
DongFangHong 1854 4WD	2000s	185 hp (138 kW)			
DongFangHong DFH-LF 80-90	2000s	80 hp (60 kW)		Fiat design	
DongFangHong T80 crawler	2000s				
DongFangHong T90 crawler	2000s			Fiat design	
DongFangHong T100-1 crawler	2000s				
DongFangHong T100G crawler	2000s				
DongFangHong T120A crawler	2000s				
DongFangHong T140 crawler	2000s				
DongFangHong TG80 crawler	2000s				
DongFangHong TS80 crawler	2000s				
DongFangHong TS100 crawler	2000s				
DongFangHong TU-200PD	2000s	20 hp (15 kW)			
DongFangHong TU-220P	2000s	22			
DongFangHong TY165 crawler	2000s				
DongFangHong U180	2000s	18 hp (13 kW)			
DongFangHong U200	2000s	20 hp (15 kW)			

=== Harvesters ===
==== Combine Harvesters ====
YTO & DongFangHong Combine Harvester Models
Model	Year(s) Produced	Horsepower	Engine Type	Misc Notes	Photo
DongFangHong 4LZ-2.5 combine		65 hp (48 kW)	DFH		
DongFangHong 4LZ-3.5 combine					
DongFangHong 4LZ-200 combine					
DongFangHong 4ZL-3.5 combine					
DongFangHong Harvest-Star combine					
DongFangHong-International 525EX combine		52 hp (39 kW)	based on Cummins		
YTO 4LZ-2.5 2008 combine					
YTO 4LZ-2.5 2008FR combine					
YTO 4LZ-2.5YA combine					
YTO 4LZ-3.5 combine					
YTO 4LZ-168 combine					
YTO 4LZ-180 combine					
YTO 4LZ-200 combine					
YTO 4LZ-220 combine					
YTO 4LZ-252 combine					
YTO 4LZ-280 combine					
YTO 4LZ-300 combine					
YTO 4150 combine					

==== Corn Pickers ====
YTO Corn Pickers Models
Model	Year(s) Produced	Horsepower	Engine Type	Misc Notes	Photo
YTO 4YZ-3 corn picker					
YTO 4YZ-4 corn picker					

=== Construction Machinery ===
==== Motor Graders ====
- MG1217A
- MG1320E
- PY165C-2
- PY180C-2
- PY185A
- PY200TF
- PY220C-2

==== Wheel Loaders ====
- ZL18H - Cummins engine
- ZL30F - Weichai engine
- ZL30-II - YTO engine
- ZL30H - Cummins engine
- ZL40H - Cummins engine
- ZL50D-II - Cummins or Shanghai engine
- ZL50F - Weichai engine
- ZL50H - Cummins engine
- ZL60H - Cummins engine
- ZL75H - Cummins engine
- ZLM30-5
- ZLM40E
- ZLM955

=== Trucks ===
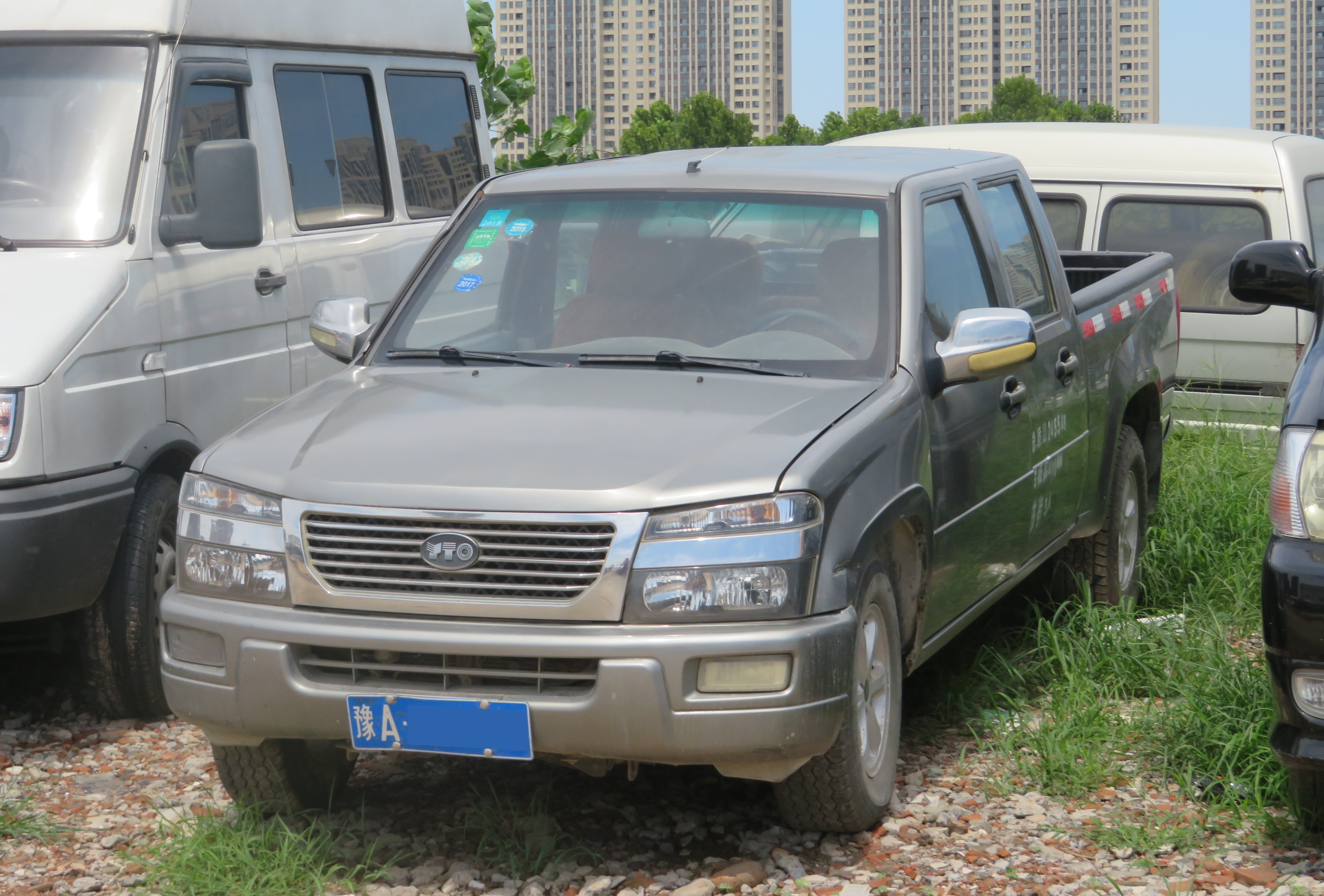
YTO LT1022SJ1L Truck

- 308
- 408
- 408P
- 608
- 608C
- 608P
- 808
- 808C
- 808P
- 828
- 828C
- 828P
- 838
- 838C
- 838P
- 858
- LT1026DP
- LT1036DP28
- LT1036DP33
- LT1026SP
- LT1036SP29
- LT1036SP33
- LT5026DPXXY
- LT5026SPXXY
- LT1022SC1L - pickup
- LT1022SJ1L - pickup
- LT1022SQ1L - pickup
- LT5013ZLJ
- LT5017ZLJ
- LT5023ZLJ
- LT5028ZLJ
- LT5030ZLJ
- LT50488ZZZ
- LT5048GPSE
- LT5080ZYS
- LT5090GPSE
- LT5090ZLJ
- LT5102ZBS
- LT5102ZYS
- LT5108ZLJ
- LT5128GPSE
- LT5142ZYS
- LT5160GPSE
- LT5160ZLJ
- LT5168ZYS
