= Lotus Elise =

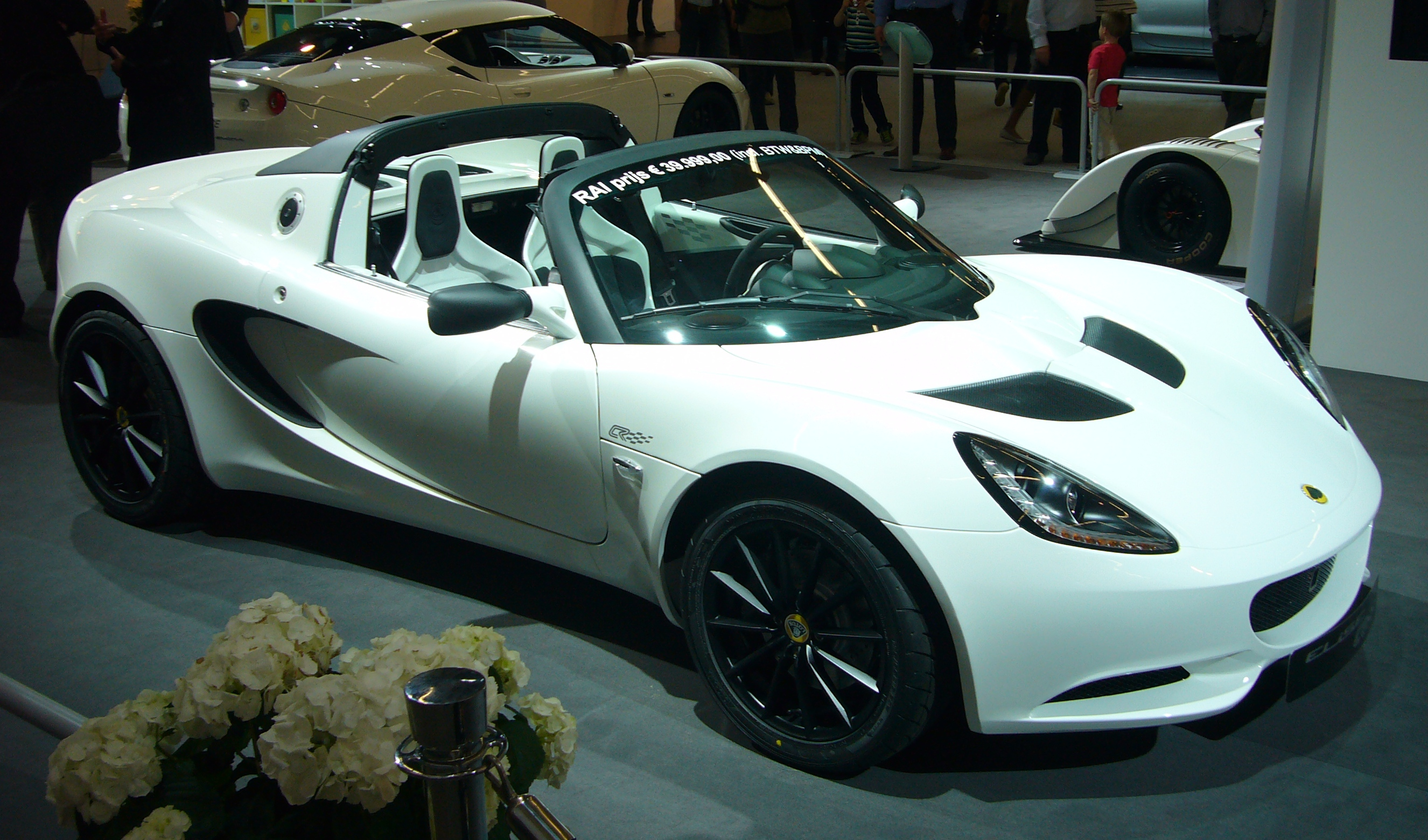
- Lotus Elise S Club Racer (Series 3)

Overview
- Manufacturer: Lotus Cars
- Production: 1996–2021; 35,124 produced
- Assembly: United Kingdom: Hethel, Norfolk, England; Malaysia: Shah Alam (Lotus Cars Malaysia: Series 1, 1997–2000)

Body and chassis
- Class: Sports car (S)
- Body style: 2-door 2-seat targa top roadster
- Layout: Transverse mid-engine, rear-wheel-drive
- Platform: Lotus small car platform

Chronology
- Predecessor: Lotus Elan
- Successor: Lotus Emira; Lotus Theory 1

The Lotus Elise is a sports car conceived in early 1994 and released in September 1996 by the British manufacturer Lotus Cars. A two-seater roadster with a rear mid-engine, rear-wheel-drive layout, the Elise has a fibreglass body shell atop its bonded extruded aluminium chassis that provides a rigid platform for the suspension, while keeping weight and production costs to a minimum. The Elise was named after Elisa Artioli, the granddaughter of Romano Artioli, who was chairman of Lotus and Bugatti at the time of the car's launch.

Production of the Elise, Exige and Evora ended in 2021. It was replaced by the Lotus Emira.

== Series 1 ==
Series 1
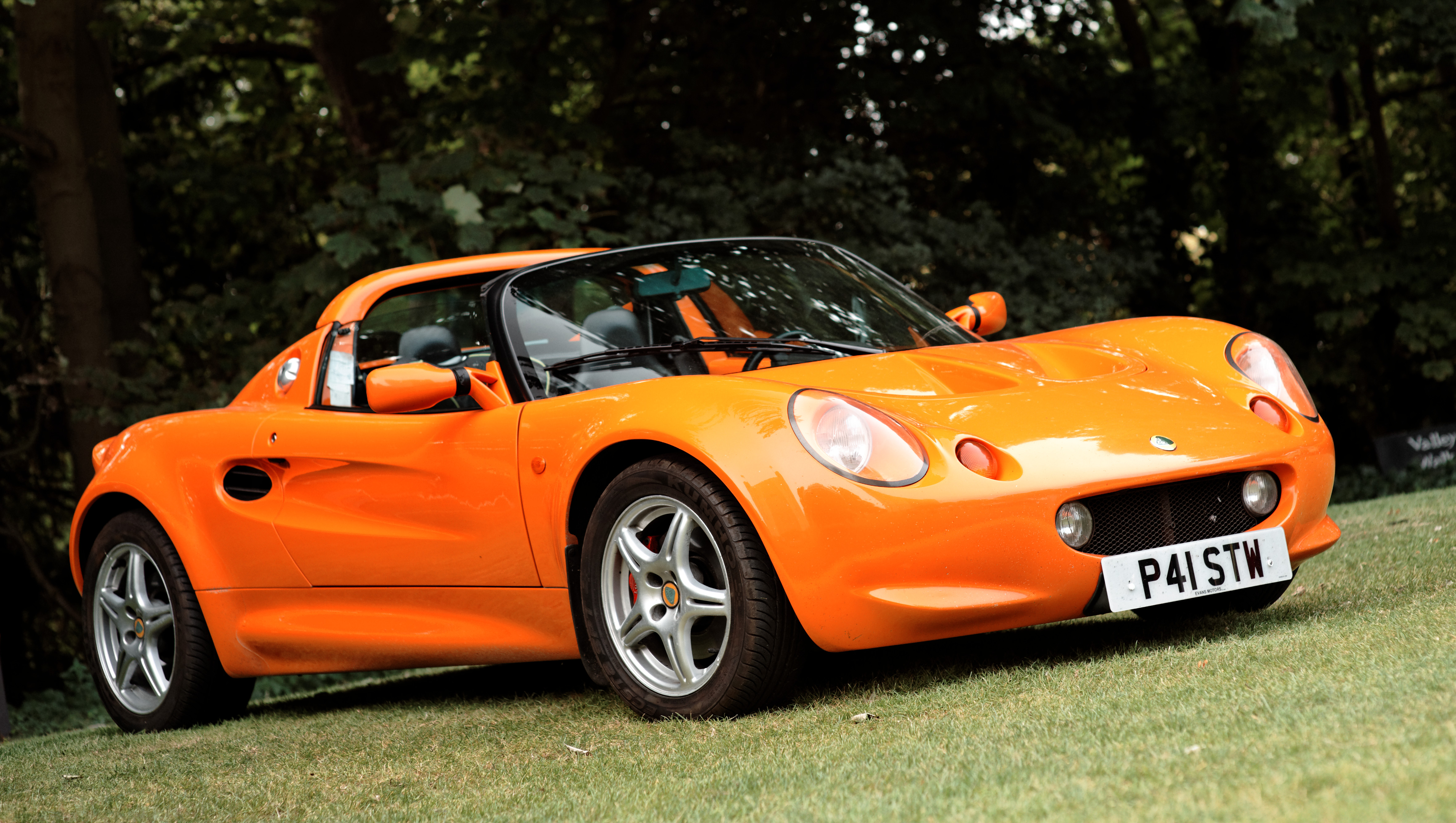

Overview
- Production: 1996–2001
- Designer: Julian Thomson

Body and chassis
- Related: Lotus 340R; Vauxhall VX220/Opel Speedster; Lotus Elise GT1

Powertrain
- Engine: 1.8 L Rover K-series I4
- Transmission: 5-speed manual

Dimensions
- Wheelbase: 2,300 mm (90.6 in)
- Length: 3,726 mm (146.7 in)
- Width: 1,719 mm (67.7 in)
- Height: 1,202 mm (47.3 in)
- Kerb weight: 725 kg (1,598.4 lb) ~ 755 kg (1,664 lb)

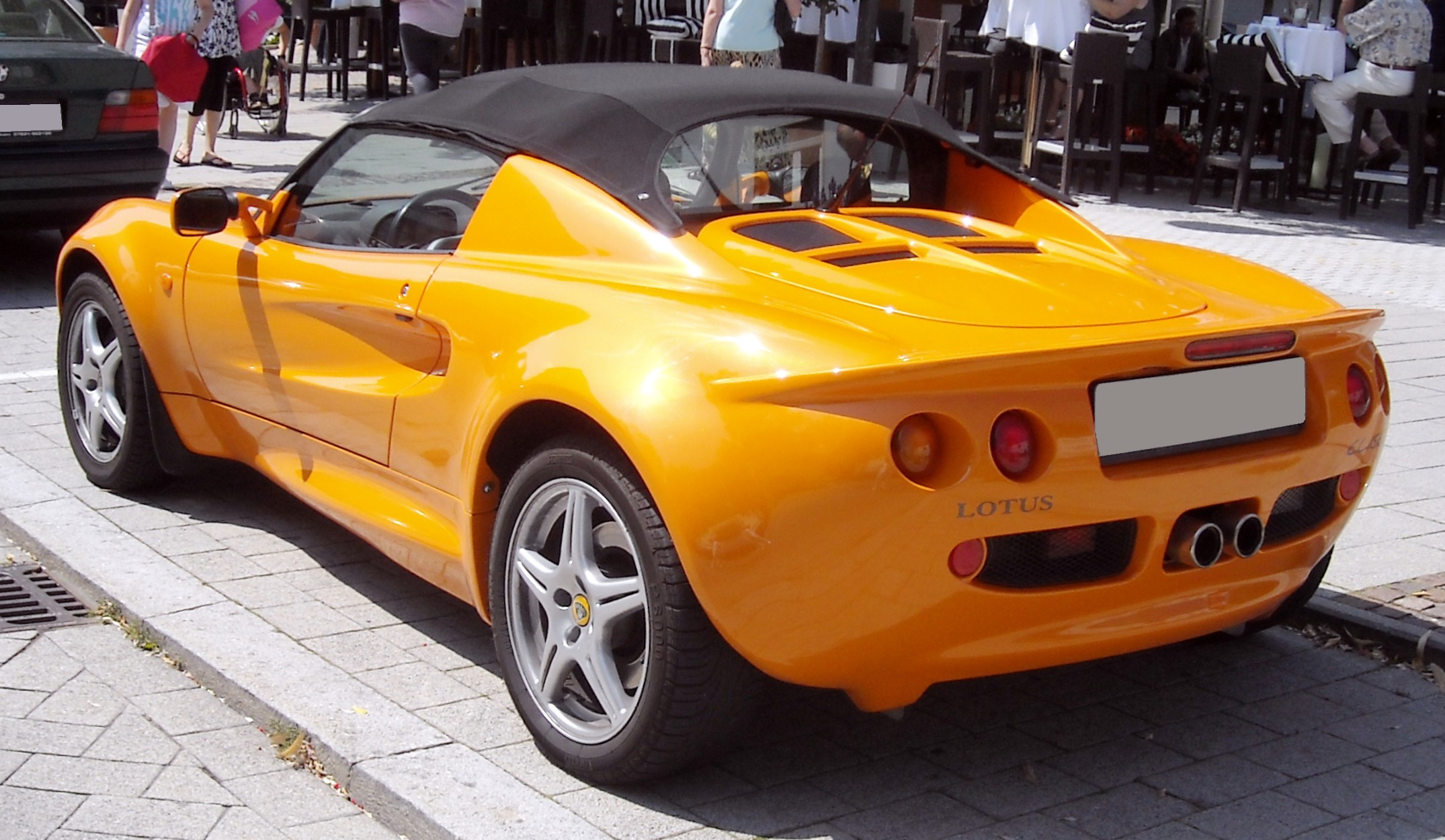
Lotus Elise Series 1

The 1996 Lotus Elise weighed 725 kg (1,598 lb). Because of this low weight, it was able to accelerate 0–60 mph (0–97 km/h) in 5.8 seconds despite its relatively low power output of 118 bhp (88 kW; 120 PS). Braking and fuel consumption are also improved by the car's reduced weight. Cornering is helped by a low centre of gravity height of 470 mm (18 1/2 in).

Series 1 was designed by Julian Thomson, then head of design at Lotus, and Richard Rackham, Lotus's chief engineer.

Besides the standard higher-performance variants listed below, Lotus also released some limited edition models such as Sport 135 (1998/9) with approximately 145 bhp (108 kW; 147 PS), Sport 160 (2000) with 150–160 bhp (112–119 kW; 152–162 PS), and Sport 190 (190 bhp (142 kW; 193 PS)). These were more competent on track with sports suspension, wheels and tyres, seats according to model. There were other special editions such as the 50th Anniversary Edition (green/gold) celebrating 50 years of Lotus cars, the Type 49 ("Gold Leaf" red and white two-tone), and Type 79 ("JPS" black/gold) which refers to its successful Grand Prix car type numbers.

The Series 1 Lotus Elise was assembled from kits on a dedicated assembly line at Proton's Shah Alam factory between 1997 and 2003. The drivetrain was imported complete and initially the bodywork was painted in the UK at Hethel prior to export. The Malaysian-assembled Elise sold for double the price of its British-built counterpart due to local vehicle taxes. The Malaysian-assembled Elise was also exported to regional markets, including Japan, Hong Kong, Australia and New Zealand. The Malaysian spec Elises came with a factory hard top, carpets and air con as standard though the air con was unreliable and ineffective. All cars had MMC brakes as that was what was current when the kits were imported in the late 1990s. The Proton-assembled Elises were assigned the code 'B' in the eleventh VIN position, while the original Hethel-built units were stamped with the code 'H'.

=== 111S ===
A faster edition called the 111S, named after the Lotus type-number of the Elise (Type 111), was introduced in early 1999 and had the 1.8 Rover K-series engine also used in the Rover MGF. It featured a VVC system providing continuously variable lift and duration on the intake valves only. This technology produced a flatter torque curve from lower down the rev range and a declared 143 bhp (107 kW; 145 PS), a small but useful improvement over the standard 16 valve Rover 1.8 L K-series 118 bhp (88 kW; 120 PS) inline-four unit. Fitted with a closer ratio manual gearbox and lower ratio final drive, the acceleration was improved. Minor changes include more padding in the seats, headlamp covers, rear spoiler, cross drilled brake discs, alloy window winders and six-spoke wheels. The rear wheels being slightly wider than before necessitated the fitting of "spats" on the back of the rear wheel arches to comply with EU regulations. The 111S was also fitted with a "chipcutter" front grille.

=== 340R ===
In 2000, the 340R limited-edition model, based on a Series 1 Elise was introduced. This roofless car was a special edition, limited to only 340 cars being built. The name 340 originally referred to the 340 bhp/tonne (254 kW/tonne) power-to-weight ratio of the original prototype which had 177 bhp (132 kW; 179 PS) while weighing just 500 kg (1,102 lb). However, in production models the 340 refers to the number of cars built. The final production versions weighed 701 kg (1,545 lb) and had a power-to-weight ratio of 252.5 bhp (188.3 kW)/tonne. A "Track Pack" was created that upped power to 192 bhp (143 kW; 195 PS) and weighed only 571 kg (1,259 lb), thus fulfilling its original power-to-weight ratio promise.

=== Exige ===
In 2000, Lotus introduced the Exige — a hardtop version of the Elise with the 177 bhp (132 kW; 179 PS) engine from the 340R; as well as different front and rear body "clamshells", larger wheels, and a rear wing. Many models received an upgrade to 190 bhp (142 kW; 193 PS) with better driveability due to changes to ECU and cam timing.

== Series 2 ==
Series 2
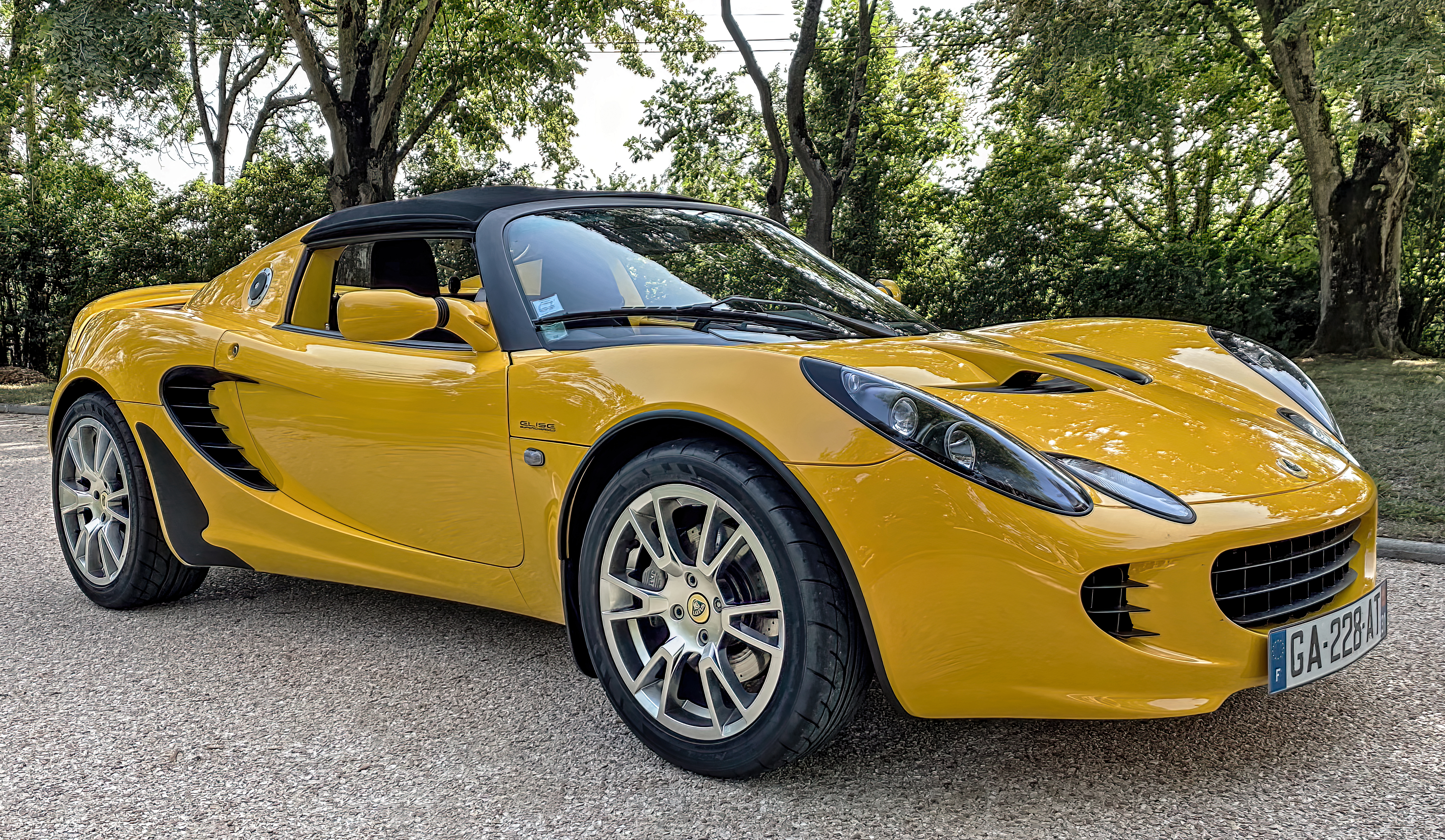

Overview
- Production: 2001–2011
- Designer: Steve Crijns

Body and chassis
- Related: Lotus Exige; Opel Speedster/Vauxhall VX220; Lotus 2-Eleven; Lotus Europa S Tesla Roadster; Hennessey Venom GT

Powertrain
- Engine: 1.8 L Rover K-series I4; 1.8 L Toyota 1ZZ-FE I4; 1.8 L Toyota 2ZZ-GE I4
- Transmission: 5-speed Rover PG1 manual 5-speed Toyota C56 manual 6-speed Toyota C64 manual

Dimensions
- Wheelbase: 2,300 mm (90.6 in)
- Length: 3,785 mm (149.0 in)
- Width: 1,719 mm (67.7 in)
- Height: 2002–2007: 1,143 mm (45.0 in); 2008–2011: 1,117 mm (44.0 in)
- Kerb weight: 860 kg (1,896 lb); 910 kg (2,006 lb)

The Series 1 could not be produced beyond the 2000 model production year due to new European crash regulations, so Lotus needed a development partner to meet the investment requirement for a Series 2 car. General Motors offered to fund the project, in return for a badged and GM-engined version of the car for their European brands, Opel and Vauxhall.

The Series 2 Elise, project code name "Monza", announced on 9 October 2000, was a redesigned Series 1 using a slightly modified version of the Series 1 chassis to meet the new regulations, and the same K-series engine with a brand new Lotus-developed ECU. The design of the body paid homage to the earlier M250 concept, and was the first Lotus to be designed on a computer.

Both the Series 2 Elise and the Opel Speedster/Vauxhall VX220 were built on the same production line in a new facility at Hethel. Both cars shared many parts, although they had different drive-trains and power-plants. Contrary to popular belief, the VX220 chassis, later used for the Europa S, is not exactly the same as the Elise S2 chassis, the VX220 having a 30mm longer wheelbase and lower door sills. The VX220 also carried the Lotus internal model identification Lotus 116, with the code name Skipton for the launch 2.2N/A version and Tornado for the 2004 introduced 2.0 L Turbo. Fitted with 17 inch over the Elise's 16 inch front wheels, the Vauxhall/Opel version ceased production in late 2005 and was replaced by the Opel GT for February 2007, with no RHD version for the United Kingdom.

Basic S2 models had a naturally aspirated 1,795 cc (1.8 L; 109.5 cu in) Rover K-series engine without VVC rated at 120 bhp (122 PS; 89 kW) at 5600 rpm and 124 lb⋅ft (168 N⋅m) at 3500 rpm of torque.

=== 111S ===
The Series 2 was also available as a 111S model, with the VVC engine Rover technology producing 160 hp (119 kW). The 111S Type 25 was built to commemorate the revolutionary race car driven by Jim Clark in F1, painted in Lotus Racing Green with twin metallic yellow stripes running front to back. Unique black Lotus styled six-spoke wheels. The interior includes perforated Ruby red leather seats, door panels and steering wheel centre (echoing the original), and red laurels embroidered onto the headrest of each seat. A Heritage Type 25 ID plate confirms its limited edition status as only 50 of these cars were produced. The UK market was to get 45 and Australia 5. During boat loading one of the 5 was damaged and only 4 sent to Australia. It's presumed the damaged car was later sold in the UK. The car is also supplied with hard top maintaining the twin stripes. The 111S models were discontinued in 2005 in favour of the Toyota powerplant.

In 2003 the Type 23 or Heritage Type 23 was built to commemorate the Colin Chapman designed race car which ran from 1962 to 1963. Like the Type 25 the car was based on the 111S and powered by the Rover K Series engine. It was limited to a production run of 50 cars, all of which were fitted with the heritage type 23 ID plate indicating the build number. Externally the car was painted in heritage white with twin parallel Lotus racing Green stripes. Heritage laurels and Union jacks were fitted to each wing, all of which set the car apart. Internally the car was fitted with perforated green leather seats, door panels and steering wheel centre, and green laurels are embroidered onto the headrest of each seat. The car was supplied with a green soft top and hard top maintaining the green stripes.

It is believed that the switch to a Toyota engine was due to federalising issues with the Rover powerplant in the US, however this has been largely unproven with little information released from Lotus as to the exact reasons. As of the time of the switch the Rover engine would still have met the standards required of it for use in America.

Two more track-focused models, the 135R and Sport 190, were available with 135 and 192 bhp (101 and 143 kW; 137 and 195 PS) respectively. These also came with associated handling upgrades such as Lotus Sport Suspension and wider wheels with Yokohama Advan A048 tyres. In certain markets, the 135R was replaced by the "Sport 111", which was similar, apart from sporting the 156 bhp (116 kW; 158 PS) VVC engine in place of the 135 bhp (101 kW; 137 PS) tuned K-series.

=== 111R / Federal Elise ===
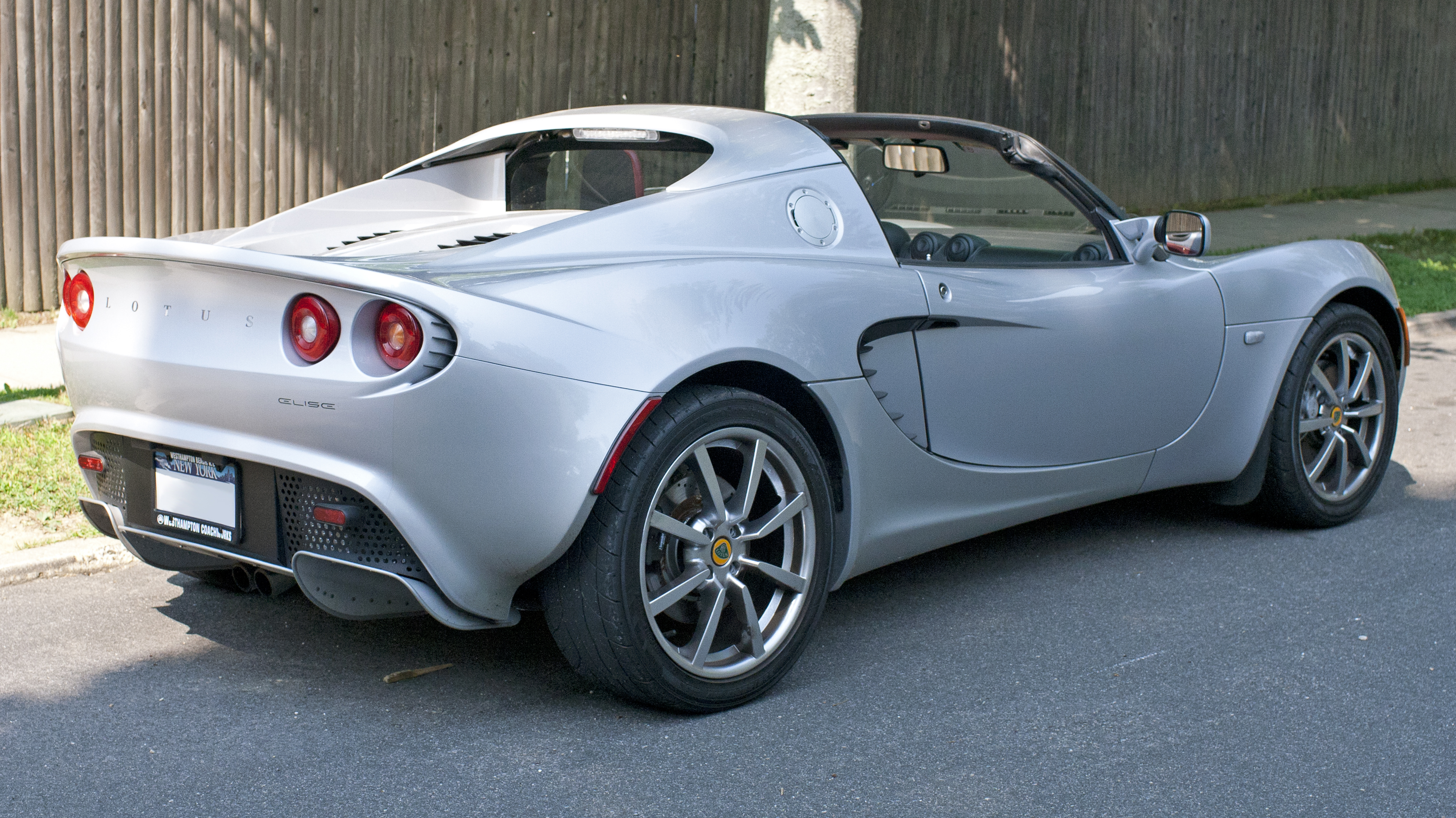
2005 Lotus Elise (US)

This Series 2 Elise model comes in a European 111R version or a version sold in North America, referred to as the Federal Elise. It is powered by the all-aluminium alloy 189 hp (192 PS; 141 kW) 1.8 L (1,796 cc) DOHC Toyota 2ZZ-GE with a Yamaha designed twin-cam head offering variable valve timing on the intake valvetrain, variable valve lift on both the intake and exhaust valvetrains, and a Toyota C64 6-speed manual transmission. Although the engine was borrowed from Toyota, its tune for the Elise was done in-house by Lotus. Many tests show performance of 0–60 mph (0–97 km/h) in approximately 4.9 seconds, or 4.7 seconds with the Sport Package.

The 2005 Lotus Elise was the first to be sold commercially in the United States, in the summer of 2004. Approval for the Elise, however, required intervention by the National Highway Traffic Safety Administration (NHTSA) which provided a three-year exemption for the car, as it had failed to meet US bumper and headlight regulations. The first-year model suffered from a few flaws, most notably a design flaw in the headlamps that magnified the sun's light, allowing the inside of the lamp housings to be melted by the sun.

This model was followed up by the 2006 Model Year Elise 111R and Sports Racer models. Lotus made a limited production (50 in the US) called the Lotus Sport Elise. 2006 models differ from the 2005 models in a few aspects. 2006 models sport LED tail lights, drive by wire (an updated ECU), improved fuel consumption, and more comfortable ProBax seats.

For the 2007 model year Lotus several minor changes were made. The LOTUS decals on the rear of the vehicle, previously flat stickers, were replaced by raised lettering. The headlamp units were sealed. Also, in order to comply with US Federally mandated bumper restrictions, the frontal crash structure was slightly changed and rear bumperettes were added next to the licence plate mount. Approximately 100 2007 model year "launch" cars were shipped to the US without these bumper changes. Also in 2007, the Elise S was released and the 111R renamed Elise R. All Lotus Elise cars manufactured after 1 January 2007 include the new headlights and 2.5 mph (4.0 km/h) bumpers, although they are hidden in the front.

The Elise S is the new base model with a Toyota sourced 1.8 L (1,796 cc) engine replacing the previous models K series Rover engine. The 2ZZ-GE engine produces 189 bhp (141 kW; 192 PS) at 6,200 rpm (a considerable increase over the 120 bhp or 89 kW or 122 PS of the Rover engine). The inclusion of airbags, ABS brakes, electric windows, and carpet in addition to the new heavier engine has increased the base weight to 860 kg (1,896 lb) (approximately 85 kg or 187 lb higher than the previous S model).

=== 2008 models ===
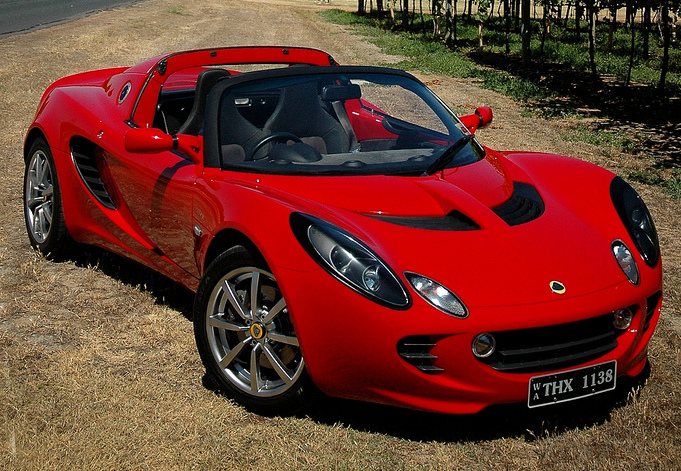
2008 Lotus Elise R in Western Australia.

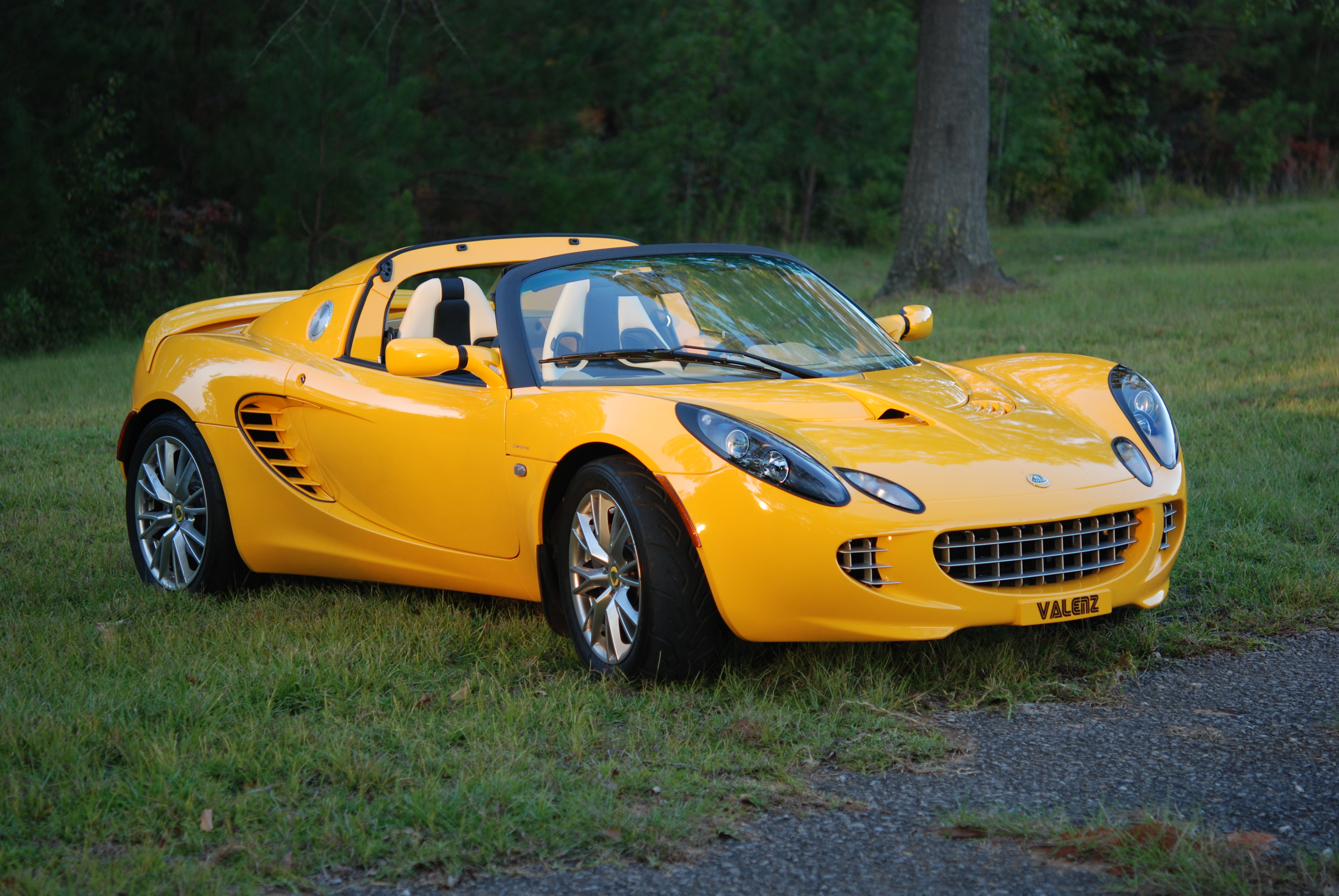
The rare Lotus Elise California Edition (US)

For 2008, there were several additions to the Lotus line-up. There are three versions of the Elise. Lotus continued to provide a naturally aspirated Elise producing 189 hp (141 kW). The second version is the Elise SC sporting a non-intercooled supercharger producing 218 hp (163 kW). 0–60 mph (0–97 km/h) is reduced from 4.9 for the base Elise or 4.7 seconds for the Elise with Sport package to 4.3 seconds for the Elise SC. The NA Elise styling is similar to the prior model years. The Elise SC, however, is distinguishable from the NA version by a rear spoiler identical to the Type 72-D edition spoiler and new wheels. Weight remained a Lotus-claimed 1,987 lb (901 kg); just 3 lb (1.4 kg) more than the previous year. Prior to the release of the 2008 Elise SC, the limited production California Edition arrived at dealerships. A total of fifty California Edition Elises were produced; 25 in Saffron Yellow and 25 in Ardent Red. The interiors of the Calis were produced in a light two-tone leather (Biscuit) and the exterior modifications included a silver front grille (a nod to vintage-Ferrari), body-coloured shutter grills on the side inlets and engine cover, enhanced 16-spoke wheels, and a large spoiler that covers the upper-rear deck (72-D style). The Calis were intended to appeal to "the lifestyle market."

In Europe, there are three models available; the Elise S with a 134 bhp (100 kW; 136 PS), 1.8L Toyota 1ZZ-FE engine and 5 speed manual gearbox (0–60 mph; 0–97 km/h) in 5.8 seconds, top speed 127 mph (204 km/h)); the Elise R with a 189 bhp (141 kW; 192 PS), 1.8 L Toyota 2ZZ-GE engine and 6-speed manual gearbox (0–60 mph; 0–97 km/h) in 4.9 seconds, top speed 148 mph (238 km/h)); and the Elise SC with a supercharged non-intercooler 1.8L Toyota 2ZZ-GE engine rated at 217 bhp (220 PS; 162 kW) at 8000 rpm and 156 lb⋅ft (212 N⋅m) at 5000 rpm of torque, 6 speed manual gearbox and a spoiler (0–60 mph; 0–97 km/h) in 4.3 seconds, top speed 150 mph (241 km/h)).

Several new colour options for 2008 were brought to the marketplace. These include new metallic colours (additional $590) Persian Blue and Liquid Blue; new Lifestyle colour (additional $1200) Isotope Green; new Limited Colour Level (additional $3,300) Candy Red, Ice White, and Burnt Orange; and the new Exclusive Colour Level (additional $5,100) Prism Green and Moonstone Silver. The following colours were discontinued for 2008: Nightfall Blue, Aubergine Purple, Magnetic Blue, Polar Blue, Autumn Gold, Chili Red, and Krypton Green.

== Series 3 ==
Series 3
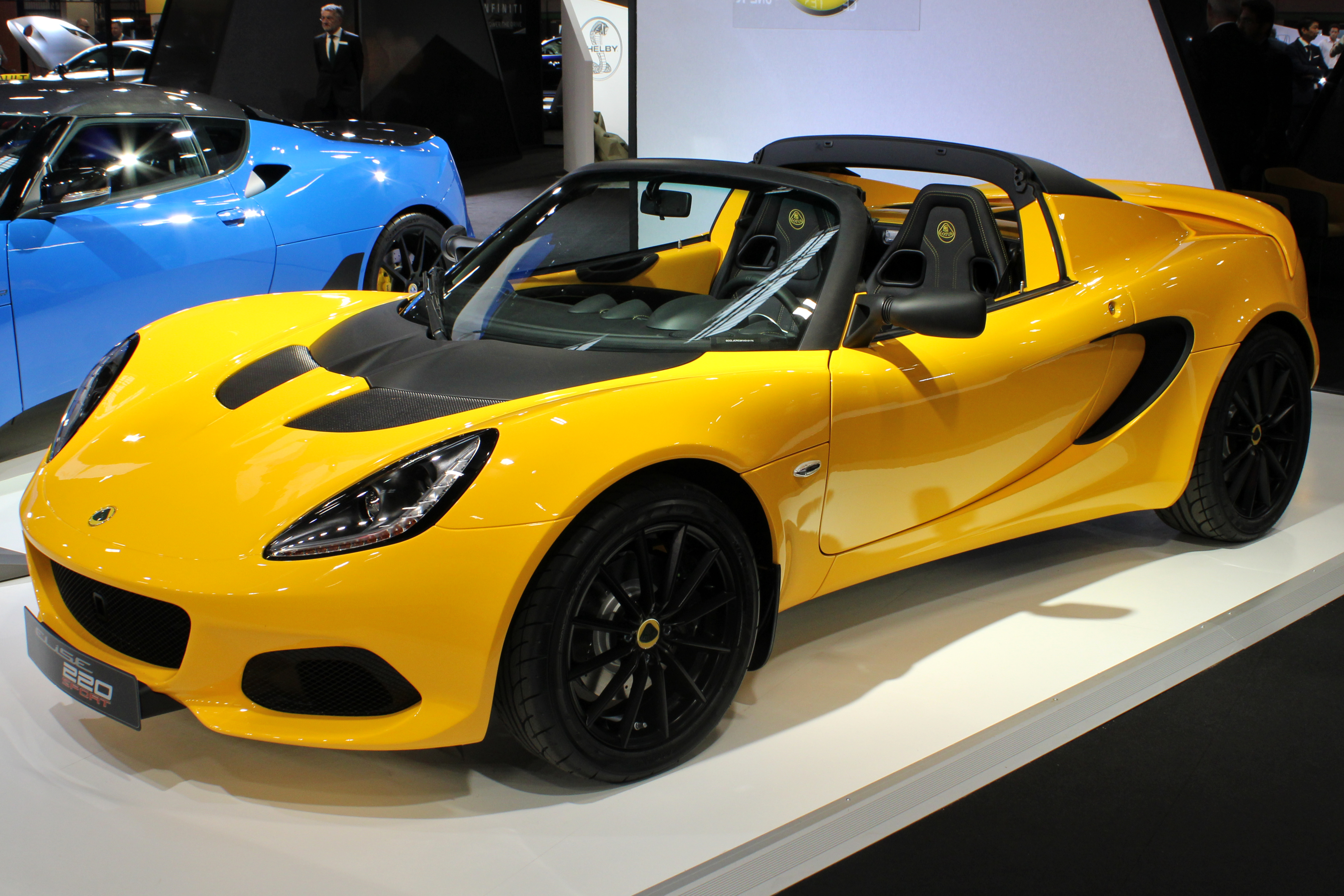

Overview
- Production: 2011–2021

Body and chassis
- Related: Lotus Exige

Powertrain
- Engine: 1.6 L Toyota 1ZR-FAE I4; 1.8 L Toyota 2ZZ-GE I4 (2011 Models); 1.8 L Toyota 2ZR-FE Supercharged I4
- Transmission: 6-speed Toyota EC60 manual 6-speed Toyota C64 manual (2011 US Models)

Dimensions
- Wheelbase: 2,300 mm (90.6 in)
- Length: 3,824 mm (150.6 in)
- Width: 1,719 mm (67.7 in)
- Height: 1,117 mm (44.0 in)
- Kerb weight: 866 kg (1,909 lb); 914 kg (2,015 lb)

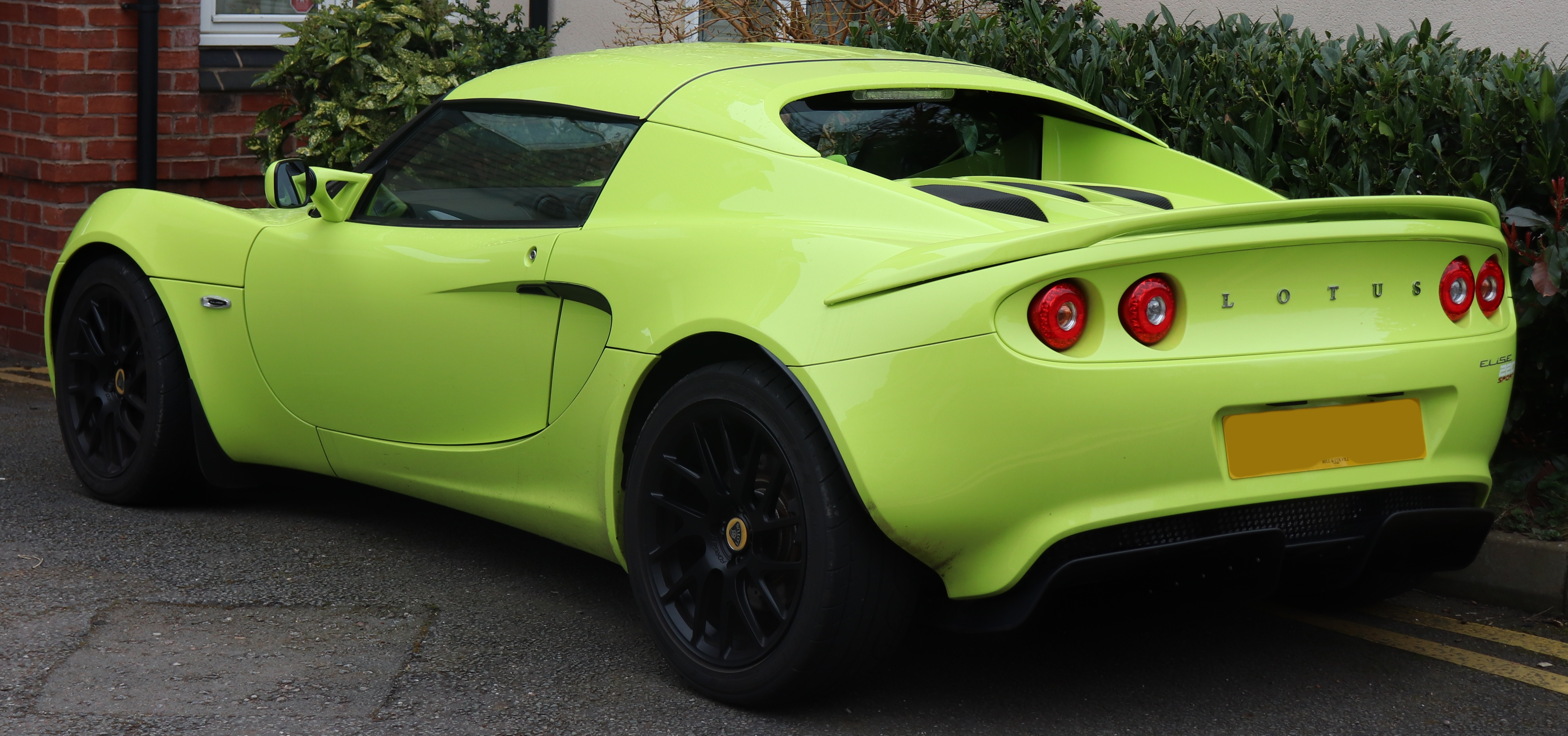
2016 Lotus Elise S

In February 2010, Lotus unveiled a facelifted version of the second generation Elise (internal project code name "Anglesey"). The new headlights are now single units; triangular in shape they are somewhat larger than the earlier lights. The cheapest version in Europe had a 1.6 litre 1ZR-FAE engine to comply with Euro 5 emissions, with the same power output as the earlier 1ZZ-FE, 136 PS (100 kW; 134 hp). The face lifted model was also available for Model Year 2011 with the 1.8 litre 2ZZ-GE in naturally aspirated form from the Series 2 111R/R and with a Magnuson R900 supercharger making 220 PS (162 kW; 217 hp). For the Model Year 2012 the 2ZZ engine was replaced by the supercharged 2ZR-FE power unit that remained until the end of production in 2021. The 1.6 litre version was discontinued in 2018.

=== US Model ===
The 2011 model was the last offered for street legal sale in the United States when the waiver from the United States Government's National Highway Traffic Safety Administration (NHTSA) for Lotus to build and sell cars in the US without smart airbags expired in August 2011. It used the Toyota 2ZZ-GE engine

=== Elise R & Elise SC ===
Two versions of the 2011 model year, similar to the US Elise, were also offered in the rest of world. Both powered by the 2ZZ-GE engine. The Elise R had the 189 hp naturally aspirated unit and the Elise SC was fitted with a supercharged 2ZZ, producing 218 hp.

=== Elise S ===
For the 2012 model year the naturally aspirated 2ZZ engine was dropped and the supercharged 2ZZ version was replaced by the supercharged 2ZR-FE Elise S. This model remained in production until being replaced in 2015 by the Elise 220 and derivatives.

=== Elise Cup 220 ===
At the 2015 Geneva Motor Show, Lotus revealed a high performance version of the Elise called the Cup 220. The Cup 220 is a more track-focused and hardcore version of the standard Elise. It has the following specifications according to a 2015 Top Gear road test:

- Engine: 1.8 litre supercharged Toyota 2ZR-FE Inline-4
- Transmission: 6-speed Toyota EC60 manual with sport ratios
- Power: 217 bhp (162 kW; 220 PS) at 6800 rpm
- Torque: 250 N⋅m (184 lb⋅ft) at 4600 rpm
- Acceleration: 0-60 mph (97 km/h) in 4.2 seconds
- Top speed: 140 mph (225 km/h)
- Weight: 932 kg (2,055 lb) (dry weight)
- Downforce: 125 kg (276 lb) at 140 mph (225 km/h)

=== Elise Sport, Sport 220 ===
Revealed in November 2015, The Lotus Elise Sport and Sport 220 are set to join the two-seater sports car's line-up, with the two models replacing the outgoing Elise and Elise S. The models mark a return for the ‘Sport’ name to a Lotus, with the badge last appearing on the Lotus Esprit. The two cars get a weight reduction of 10 kg, with the Elise Sport now down to 866 kg and the Sport 220 now 914 kg. The reduced weight doesn't improve performance but it does bring a marginal boost in claimed economy, with the Sport now managing 45.0 mpg the Sport 220 improving to 37.5 mpg. The changes are marginal enough that the CO_{2} emissions remain unchanged.

Both cars also come with lightweight sports seats, which are available with optional tartan trim that harks back to the 1970s Esprit S1. Other visual upgrades and options include lightweight silver or black cast wheels, which are 16 inch at the front and 17 inch at the rear. Optional lightweight wheels can reduce another 5 kg from the car's weight. A black rear diffuser is standard, along with a choice of 10 colours. Other options include a hard roof, air conditioning, cruise control and an upgraded Clarion stereo system.

The engines remain unchanged. The Sport comes with a 1.6-litre petrol engine with 134 bhp (136 PS; 100 kW) and 160 N⋅m (118 lb⋅ft) of torque. It can go 0-62 mph in 6.5 seconds, and has a top speed of 127 mph. The Sport 220's 1.8-litre engine can develop 217 bhp (220 PS; 162 kW) and 250 N⋅m (184 lb⋅ft) of torque. It can go 0-62 mph in 4.6 seconds and has a 145 mph of top speed. Both come with a six-speed manual transmission.

The pricing has also been trimmed, with the Elise Sport model starting at £29,900 and the Elise Sport 220 priced at £36,500. Both cars will go on sale from December 2015 in Europe and the rest of the world from January 2016.

=== Elise Cup 250 ===
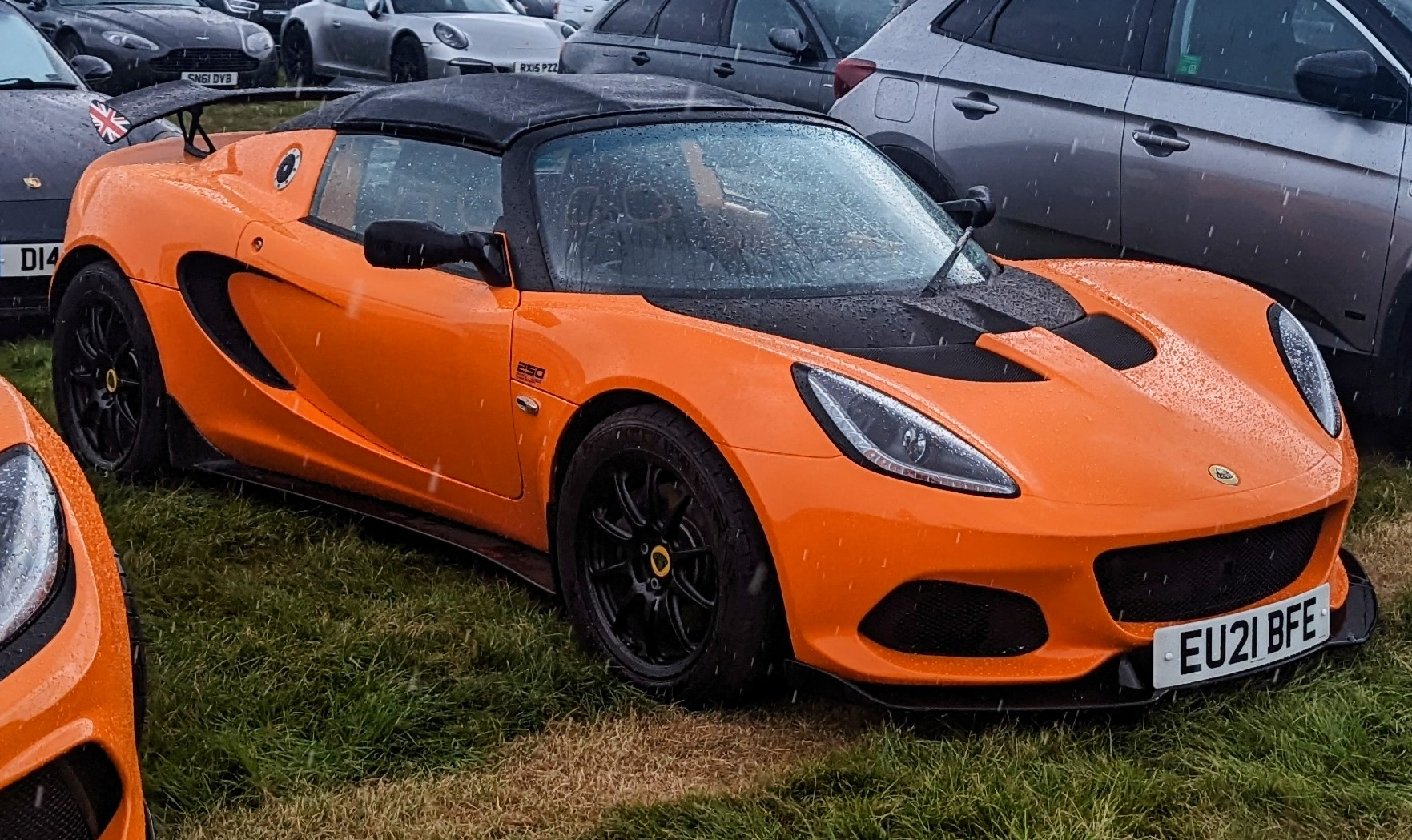
Lotus Elise Cup 250

At the 2016 Geneva Motor Show, Lotus revealed the high performance version of the Elise called the Cup 250. The Cup 250 is a more track focused and hardcore version of the standard Elise. It has the following specifications according to Lotus:

- Engine: 1.8 litre supercharged Toyota 2ZR-FE Inline-4
- Transmission: 6-speed Toyota EC60 manual with sport ratios
- Power: 243 bhp (181 kW; 246 PS) at 7200 rpm
- Torque: 250 N⋅m (184 lb⋅ft) at 5500 rpm
- Acceleration: 0-60 mph (97 km/h) in 3.9 seconds
- Top speed: 154 mph (248 km/h)
- Weight: 884 kg (1,949 lb) (dry weight)
- Downforce: 125 kg (276 lb) at 140 mph (225 km/h)

=== Elise Cup 260 ===
In October 2017, Lotus unveiled a hardcore version of the Elise called the Elise Cup 260. It is inspired by the two hardcore variants of the Evora and Exige line up, the Sport 380 and the GT430 respectively. It features the double taillight units and rear wing from the Exige Sport 380 and the Lotus 3-Eleven respectively. Power has also been uprated and is now 250 hp (186 kW; 253 PS) thanks to a revised supercharger. Other changes include increased top speed, acceleration, low weight and high downforce due to added aero elements. The Elise Cup 260 has the following specifications according to Lotus:

- Engine: 1.8 litre supercharged Toyota 2ZR-FE Inline-4
- Transmission: 6-speed Toyota EC60 manual with sport ratios
- Power: 250 bhp (186 kW; 253 PS) at 7200 rpm
- Torque: 265 N⋅m (195 lb⋅ft) at 5500 rpm
- Acceleration: 0-60 mph (97 km/h) in 3.8 seconds
- Top speed: 151 mph (243 km/h)
- Weight: 862 kg (1,900 lb) (dry weight)
- Downforce: 180 kg (397 lb) at 151 mph (243 km/h)

=== Elise Sprint ===
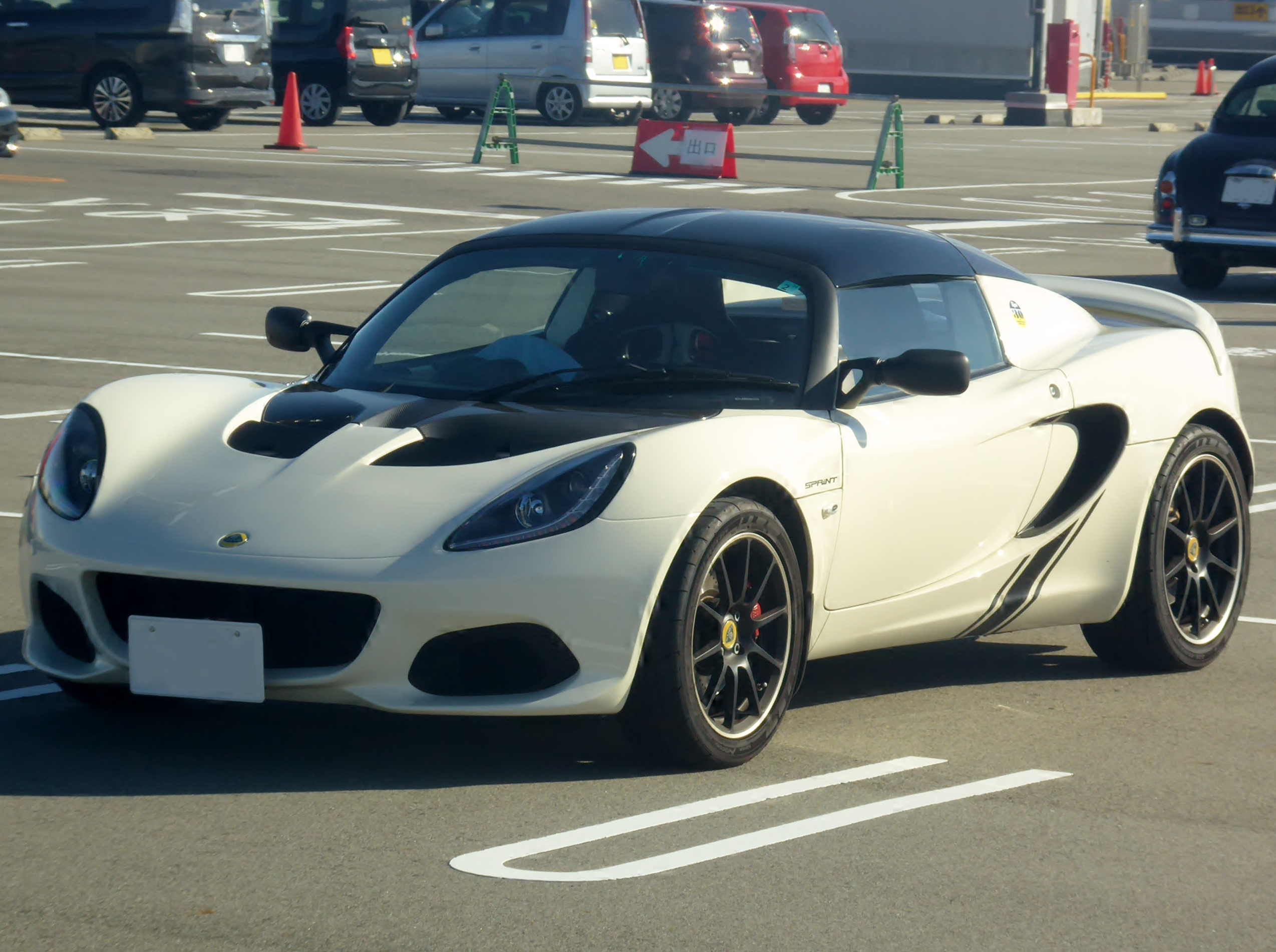
Elise Sprint 220

In March 2017, Lotus announced the special edition 'Sprint' models of the Elise. For the Elise Sprint, Lotus used several weight-saving techniques to cut the car's weight down to 798 kg (1,759 lb). To achieve the 40 kg (88 lb) weight saving, some body parts are made in carbon, as well as the seats. The backlight glass is made of polycarbonate, and the lightweight battery is a Lithium-ion model. Wheels are the usual size, but forged instead of cast alloy. The Sprint can be had with either a 1.6-litre naturally aspirated engine, or a 1.8-litre supercharged engine, available for the Sprint 220 version. The former has a 0–60 mph (97 km/h) time of 5.9 seconds, while the Sprint 220 can accelerate from 0–60 mph (97 km/h) in 4.1 seconds. Dampers are uprated, as on the Elise Cup models.

=== Elise Sport 240, Cup 250 Final Edition ===
On 9 February 2021, Lotus unveiled two final editions line-up models of Elise on online platforms.

Opening the range is the Elise Sport 240 Final Edition, which sees the existing Sport 220's 1.8-litre supercharged four-cylinder engine uprated to develop 240 bhp (243 PS; 179 kW) and 244 N⋅m (180 lb⋅ft), permitting a zero to 100 km/h time of 4.5 seconds. When fully specified with weight-saving options – namely carbon-fibre sill and engine covers, a lithium-ion starter battery and a polycarbonate rear window – the Sport 240 is the lightest car on offer, at 898 kg. A set of 10-spoke forged alloy wheels fill the arches, measuring 40.6 cm (16 inches) in diameter up front and 43 cm (17 inches) at the rear, using Yokohama Y105 tyres. Lotus claims the new wheels are 0.5 kg lighter than those fitted to the outgoing Sport 220.

The Elise Cup 250 Final Edition features a variant of the Sport 240's 1.8-litre four-cylinder, now tuned to produce 245 bhp (248 PS; 183 kW) and 244 N⋅m (180 lb⋅ft). Lotus claims a 4.3-second 0–100 km/h sprint time. This model gets an optimised aerodynamic package allowing for 155 kg of downforce at its top speed of 248 km/h, along with 10-spoke M Sport forged alloy wheels, Yokohama A052 tyres, Bilstein dampers and adjustable anti-roll bars. A lightweight lithium-ion battery and polycarbonate rear window are also fitted as standard for increased weight saving, and, in top spec layout, the car weighs 931 kg.

The last Elise built was a Sport 240, painted gold; it was delivered to Elisa Artioli, the car's namesake.

== Elise Concept ==
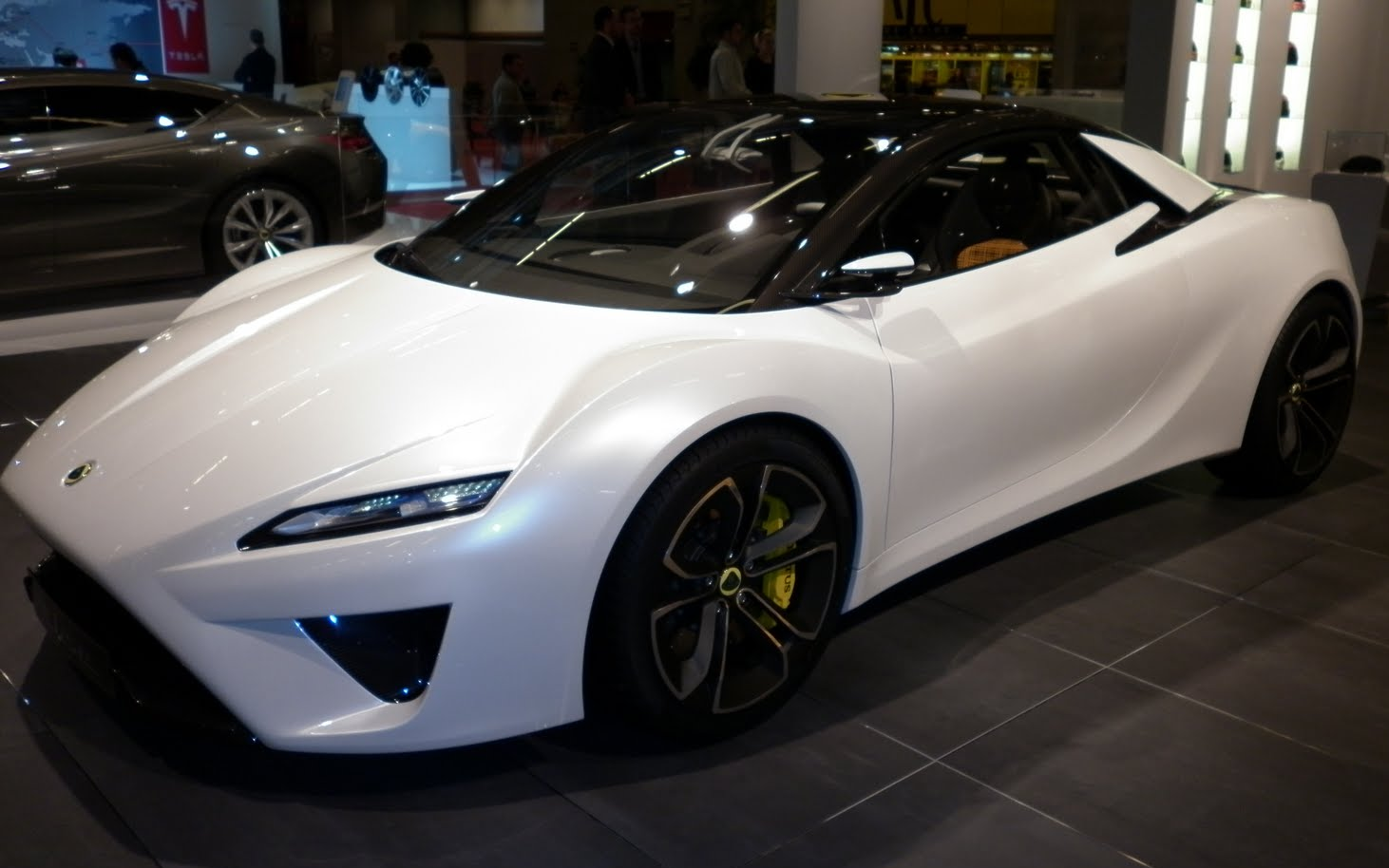
Third generation Elise Concept at the 2010 Paris Motor Show.

The series 3 Lotus Elise first appeared as a design study alongside the Lotus Esprit concept at the 2010 Paris Motor Show as the "Lotus Elise Concept" in the autumn of that year, and was set to be launched within the next couple of years. The car was heavier than the production model of that time, and had a considerably more powerful 2.0-litre inline-4 engine. The production model was then unveiled with many changes, including the downsizing of the engine to 1.6 litre and 1.8 litre (supercharged) and a different design with little cues taken from the concept.

== Special editions ==
- Sport 220
- Sport 190
- Sport 160
- Sport 135R
- Lotus Sport 111 (Track based option for Australia, Hong Kong, Japan & Singapore)
- Type 23
- 50th Anniversary Edition
- 60th Anniversary Edition
- Jim Clark Type 25
- Type 25
- Type 49
- Lotus Sport Edition
- Type 72
- Type 79
- Type 99T
- Sports Racer
- Race Tech
- Club Racer
- California Edition
- Purist Edition
- Final Edition
- Roger Becker SC

=== Exige ===
The Series 2 Exige comes with the same high revving Toyota 1.8L engine and six speed gearbox as the Elise 111R, replacing the Rover K-series engine of the previous Exige.

The Series 2 Exige has been followed by the limited-edition Lotus Sport Exige 240R, incorporating a Lotus-developed supercharger atop the Lotus engine. The US Federalised version with the supercharger fitted is known as the Exige S 240.

=== Zytek Lotus Elise ===
The Zytek Lotus Elise is an electric sports car that was jointly produced by Lotus and Zytek from 1998 until 2003.

Its 70 kg (154 lb) extruded aluminium space frame and lightweight composite body shell are factors in its low kerb weight of 875 kg (1,929 lb). 250 nickel-cadmium batteries provide 300 volts (at full charge) to two Zytek oil-cooled brushless DC motors, which deliver a total power of 150 kW (201 hp; 204 PS) and torque of 100 N⋅m (74 lb⋅ft). These motors are each mated to a single-speed, fixed ratio transmission with an aluminium gear. Its acceleration time from 30 to 70 mph (48 to 113 km/h) is 5 seconds, and from 0 to 90 mph (145 km/h) is 11.2 seconds. The car is governor-limited to 90 mph (145 km/h) to conserve charge. The range per charge is typically 100 to 120 mi (161 to 193 km) and the car can be re-charged within an hour.

There is an example of the Zytek Elise on display at the Heritage Motor Centre.

=== Other cars sharing the Elise platform ===
- Hennessey Venom GT
- Lotus 2-Eleven
- Lotus 340R
- Lotus 3-Eleven
- Lotus Circuit Car
- Lotus Elise GT1
- Lotus Europa S/Dodge EV
- Lotus Motorsport Elise
- Lotus Sport Exige 300RR
- Melkus RS 2000
- Opel Speedster/Vauxhall VX220/Opel Eco-Speedster Concept
- Rezvani Beast Alpha
- Rinspeed sQuba
- Tesla Roadster (2008)
- PG Elektrus
- Detroit Electric SP.01

== Awards and recognition ==
The Elise has received critical acclaim for its performance and driving experience, including Best Driver's Car 2001 (Autocar), Car of the Year 2003 (UK Horizons TV), Best Sportscar 2004 (BBC Top Gear Magazine), and Icon of Icons at the Autocar Awards 2019 (Autocar). The Daily Telegraph listed the Elise at number 44 of their 100 best cars ever made.

== Gallery ==
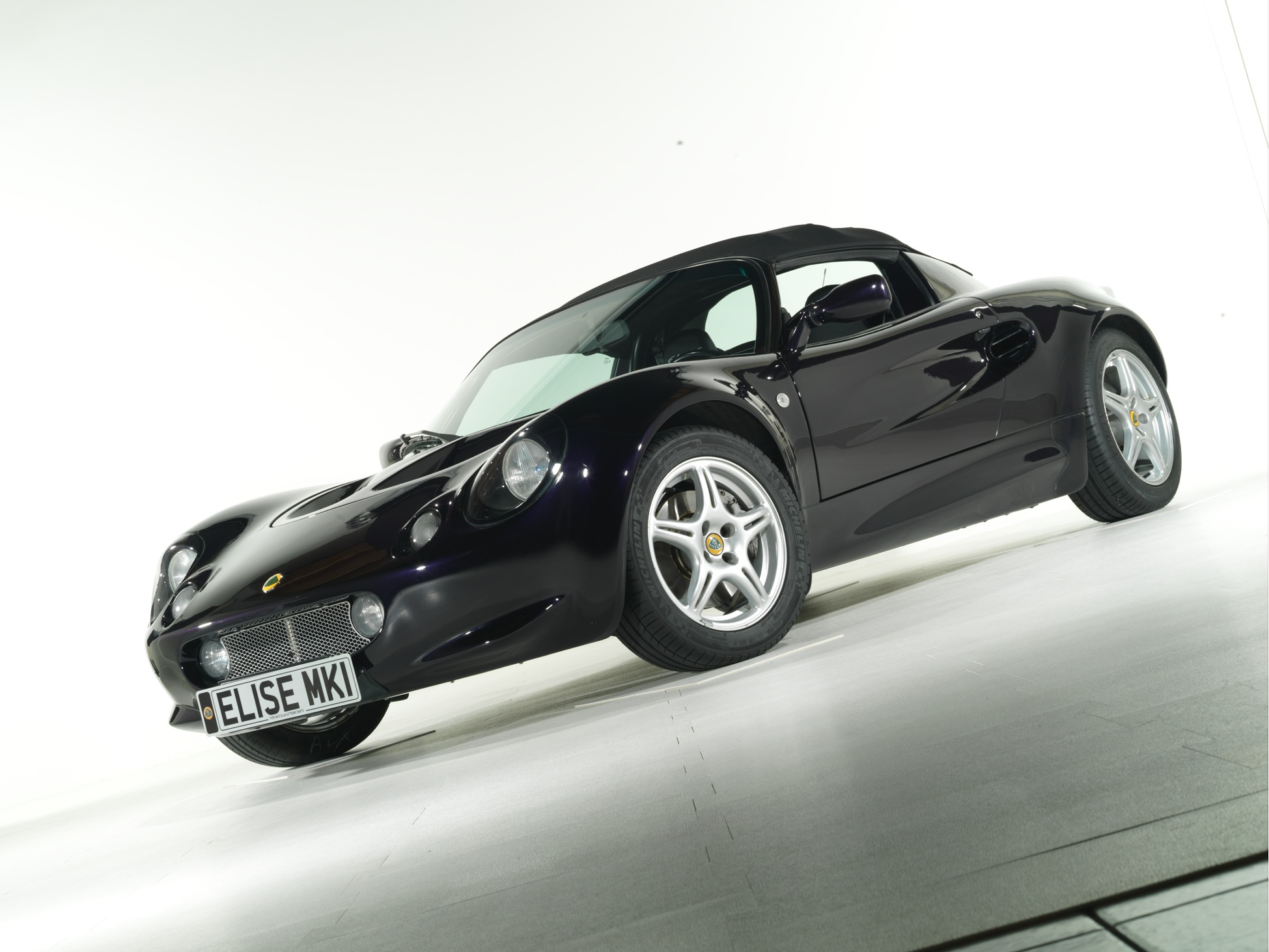
Lotus Elise S1

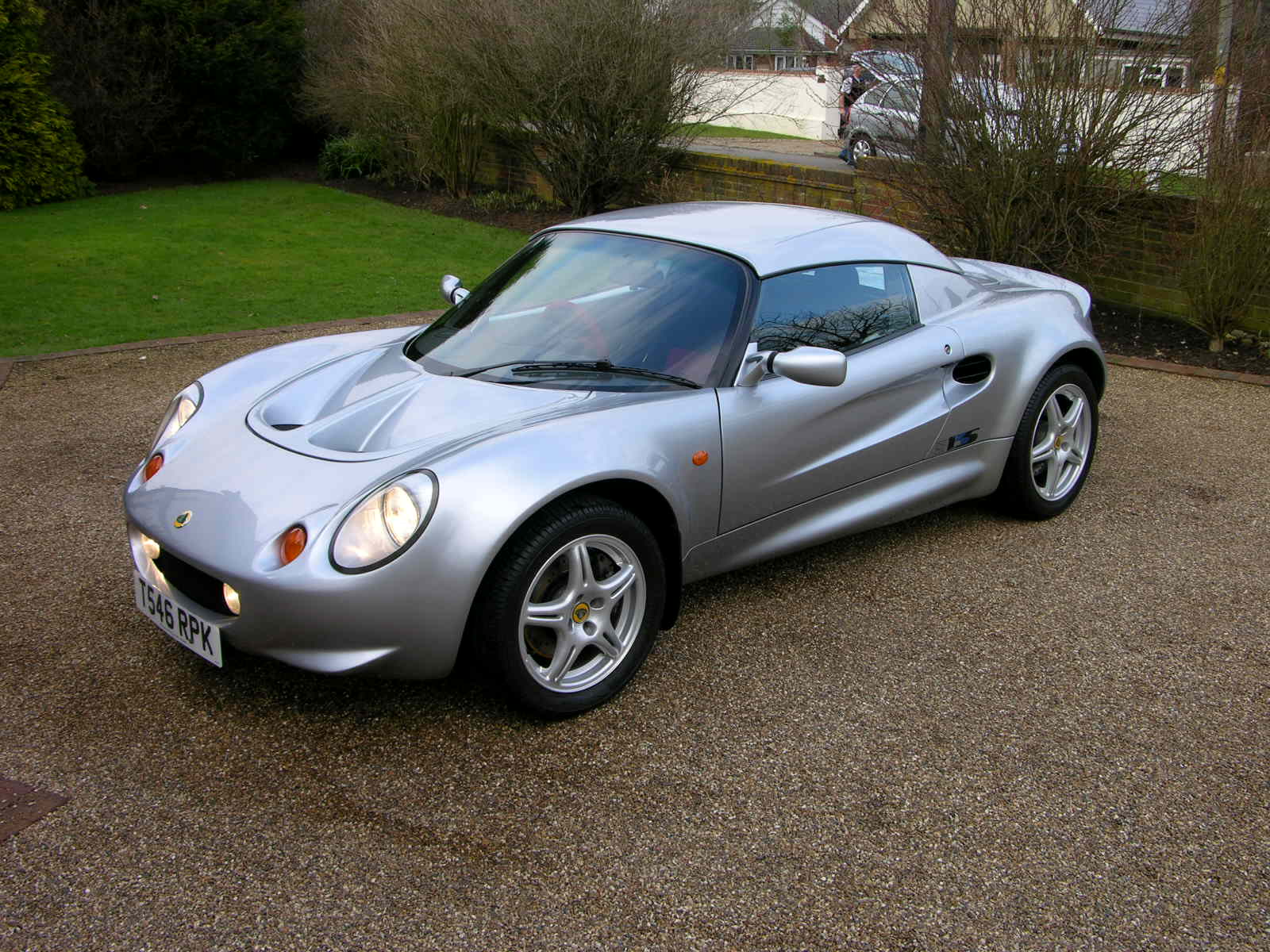
Lotus Elise Sport 135

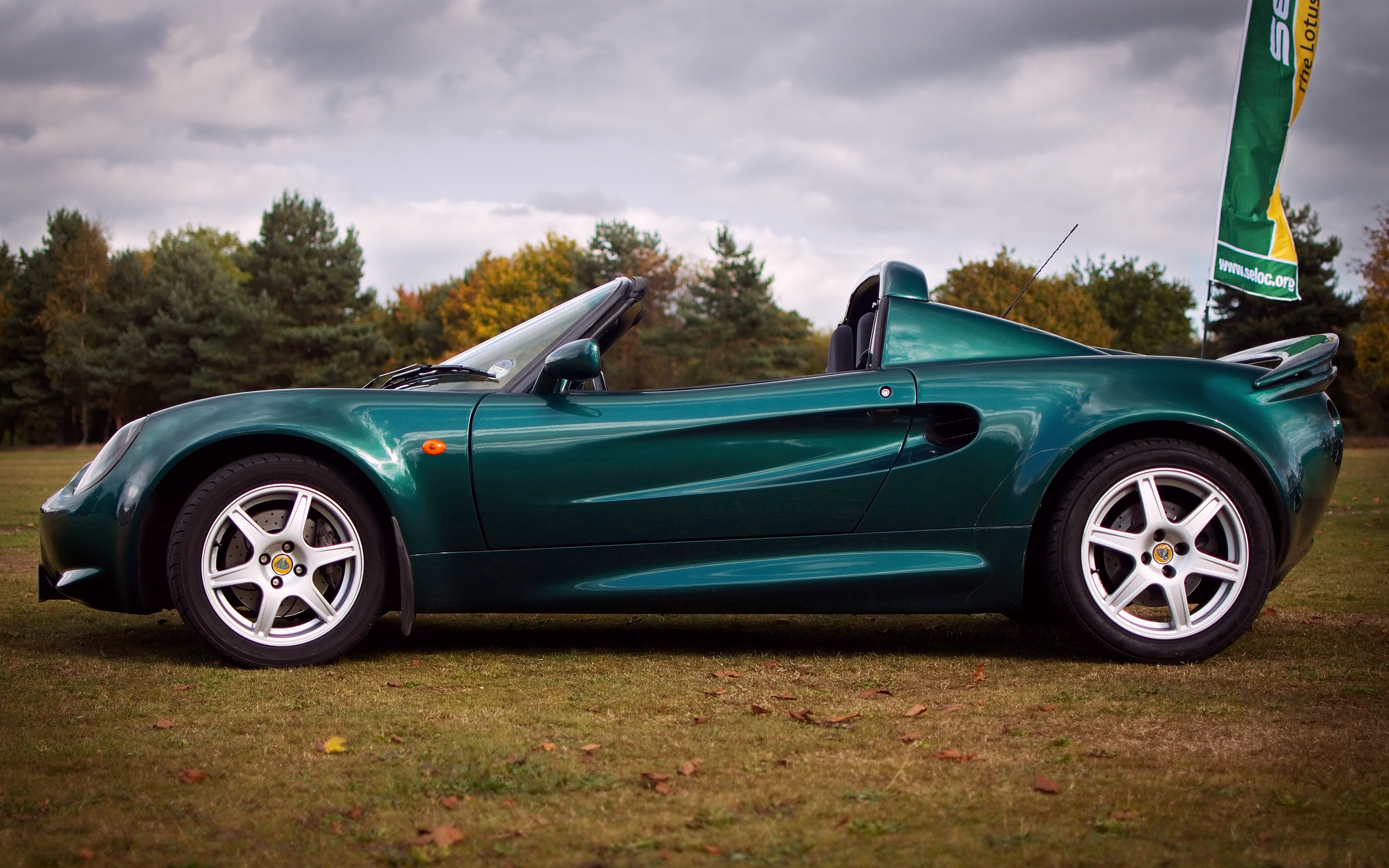
Lotus Elise 111S (Series 1) at the Thatcham Classic Car Show in 2009

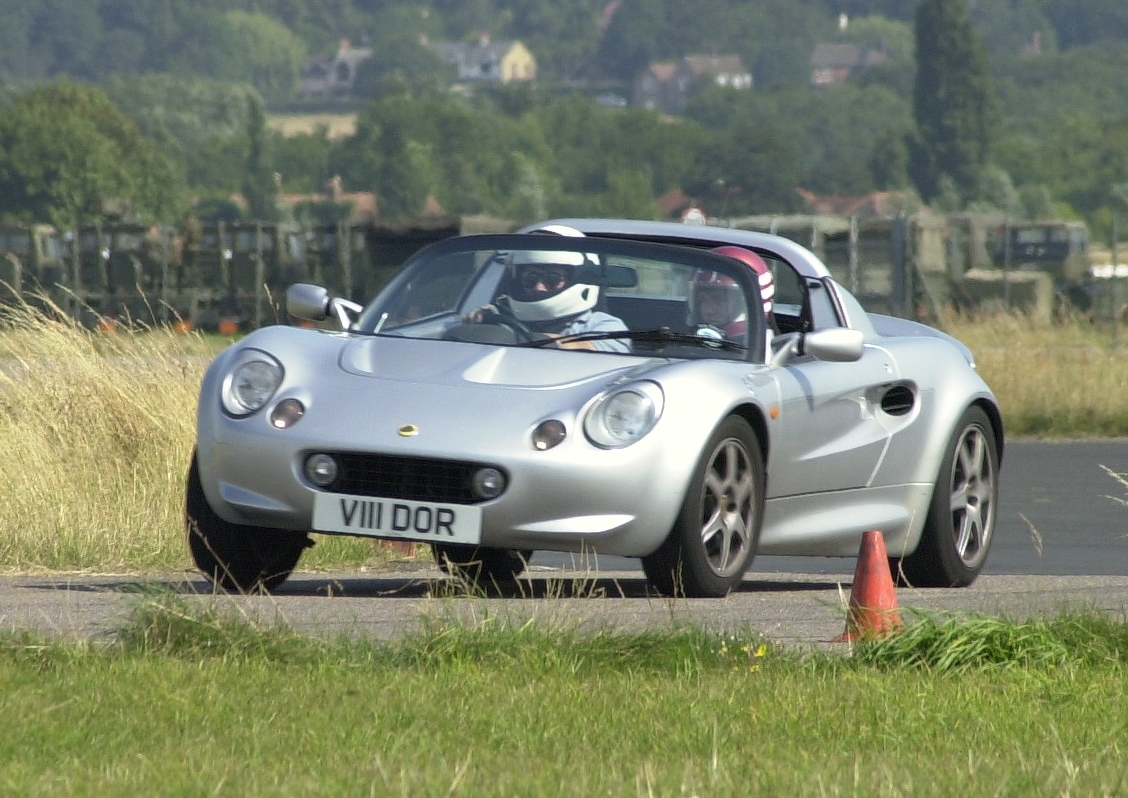
Lotus Elise 111S

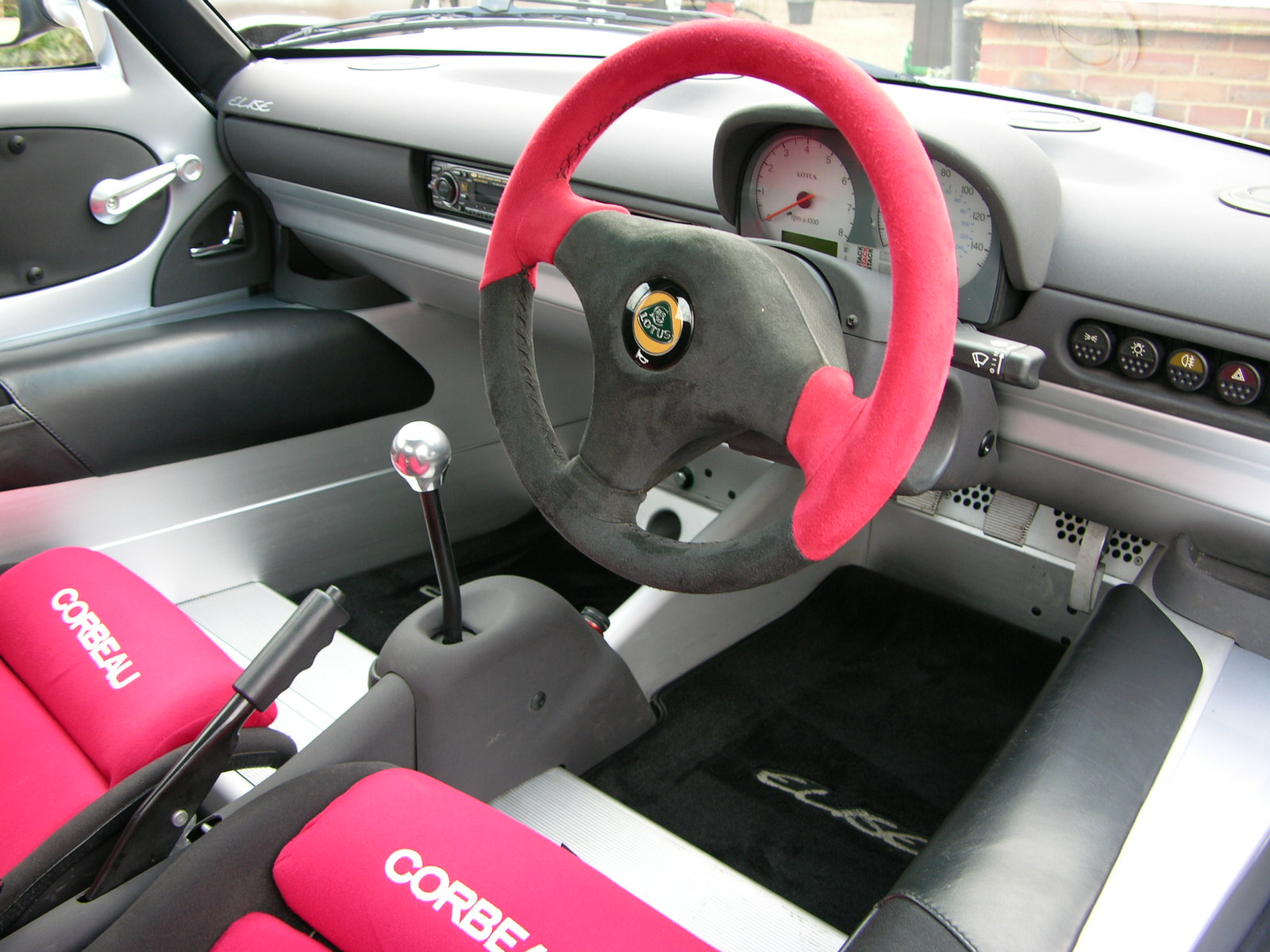
Interior of a Lotus S1, with Sport 135 seats and steering wheel

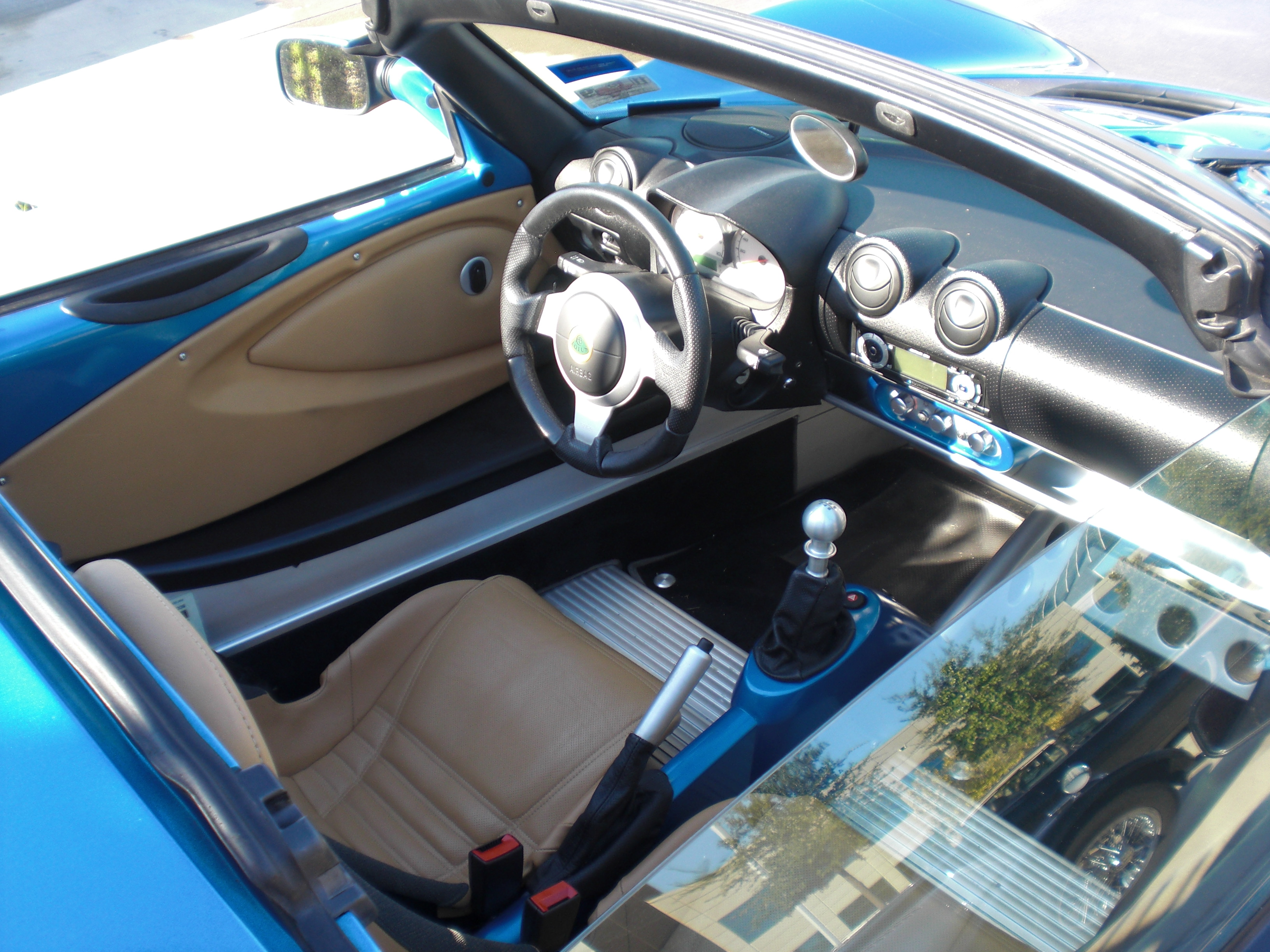
Interior of a Lotus Elise S2

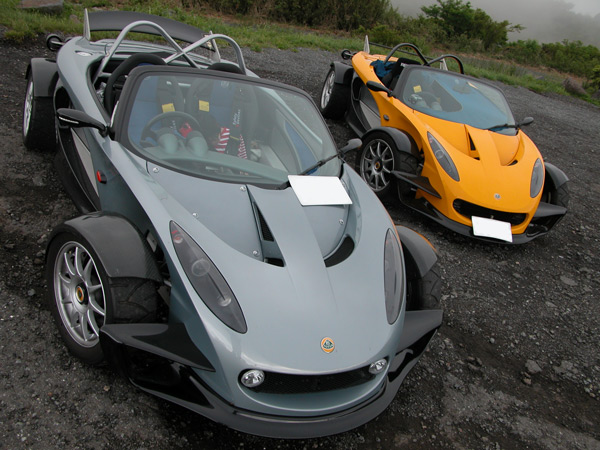
Lotus 340R

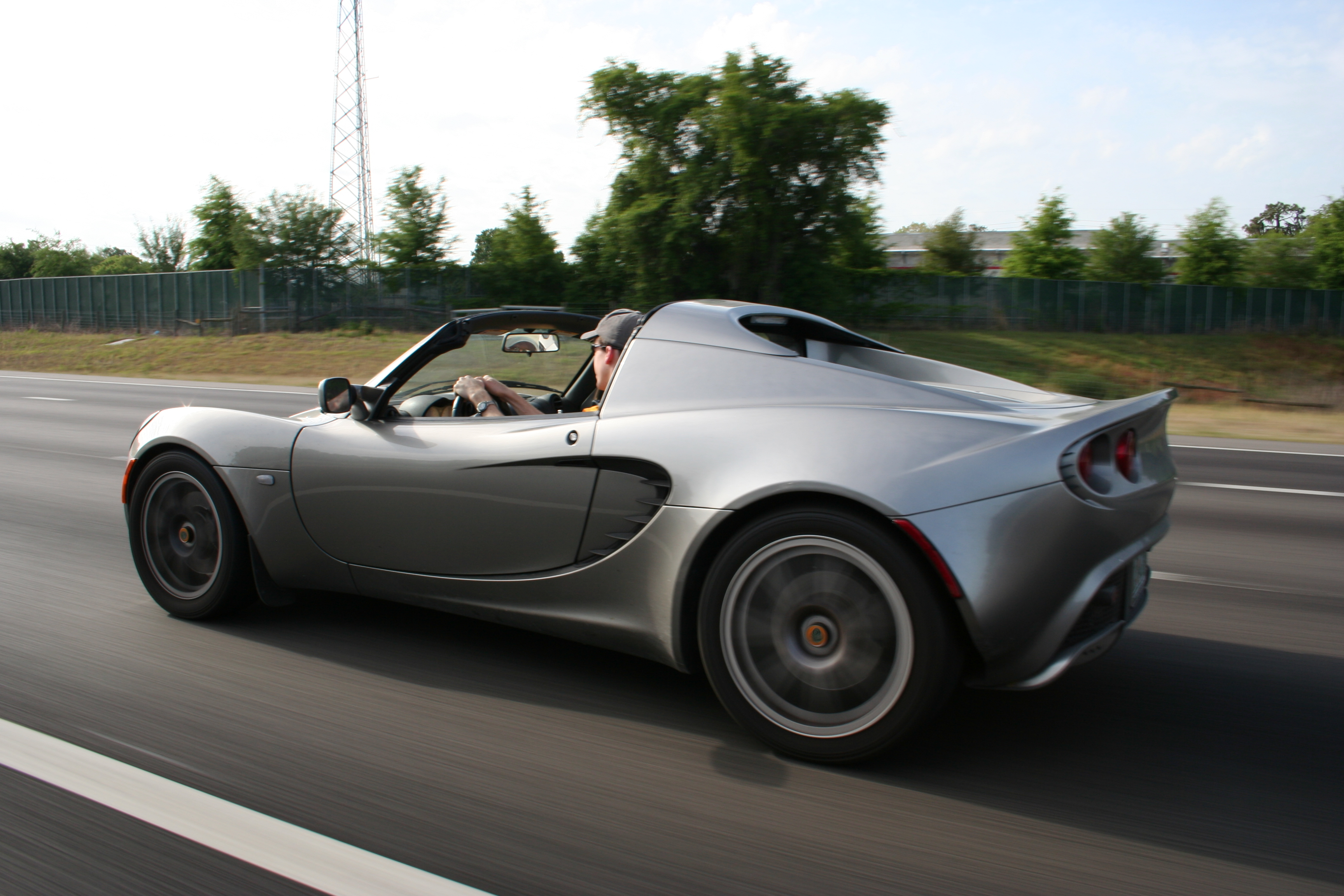
A Lotus Elise drives on Interstate 4 in Central Florida

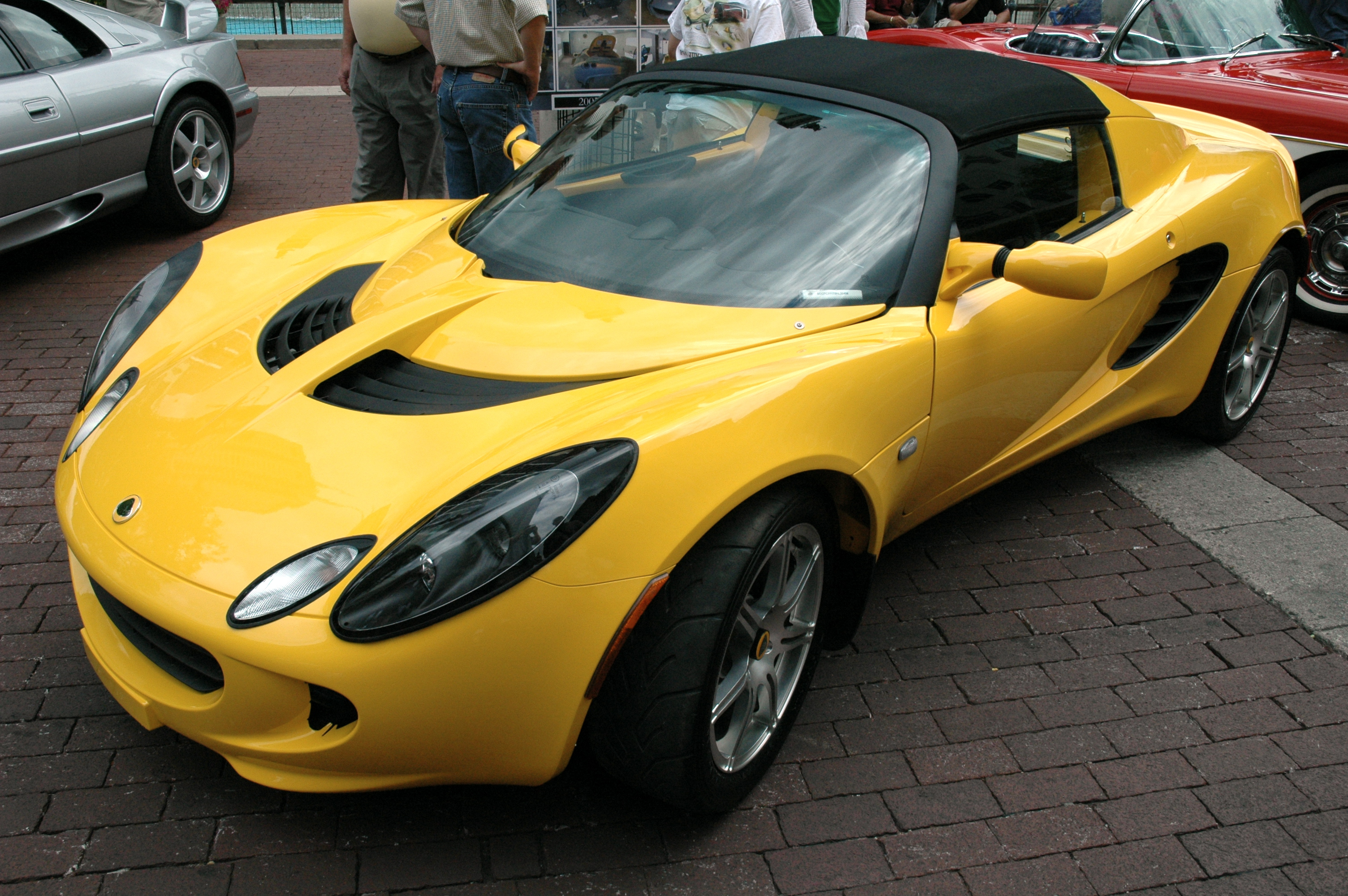
US "Federal Elise" configuration of a standard Lotus Elise on display in Indiana

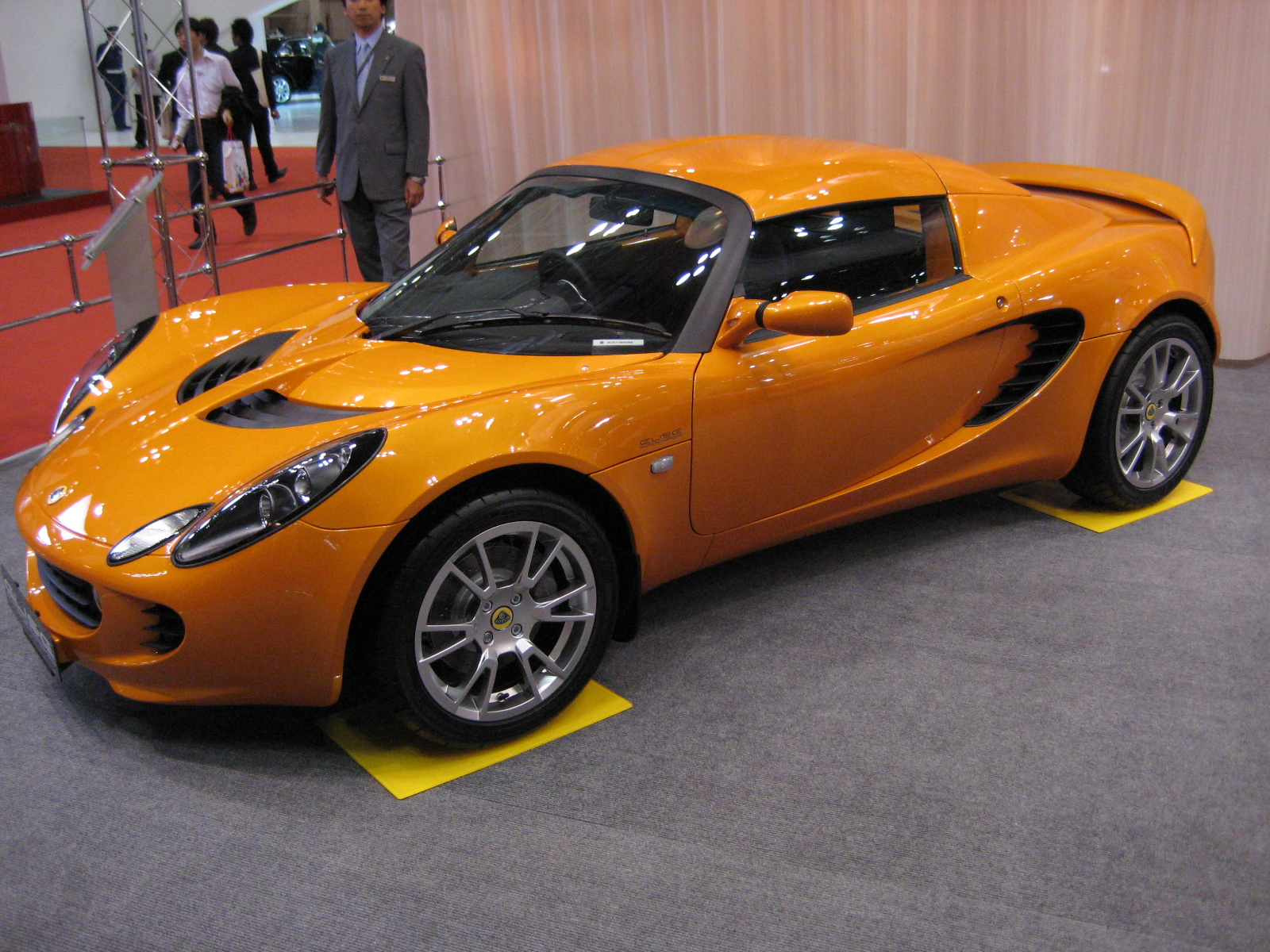
Elise SC premiere at the 2007 Tokyo Motor Show

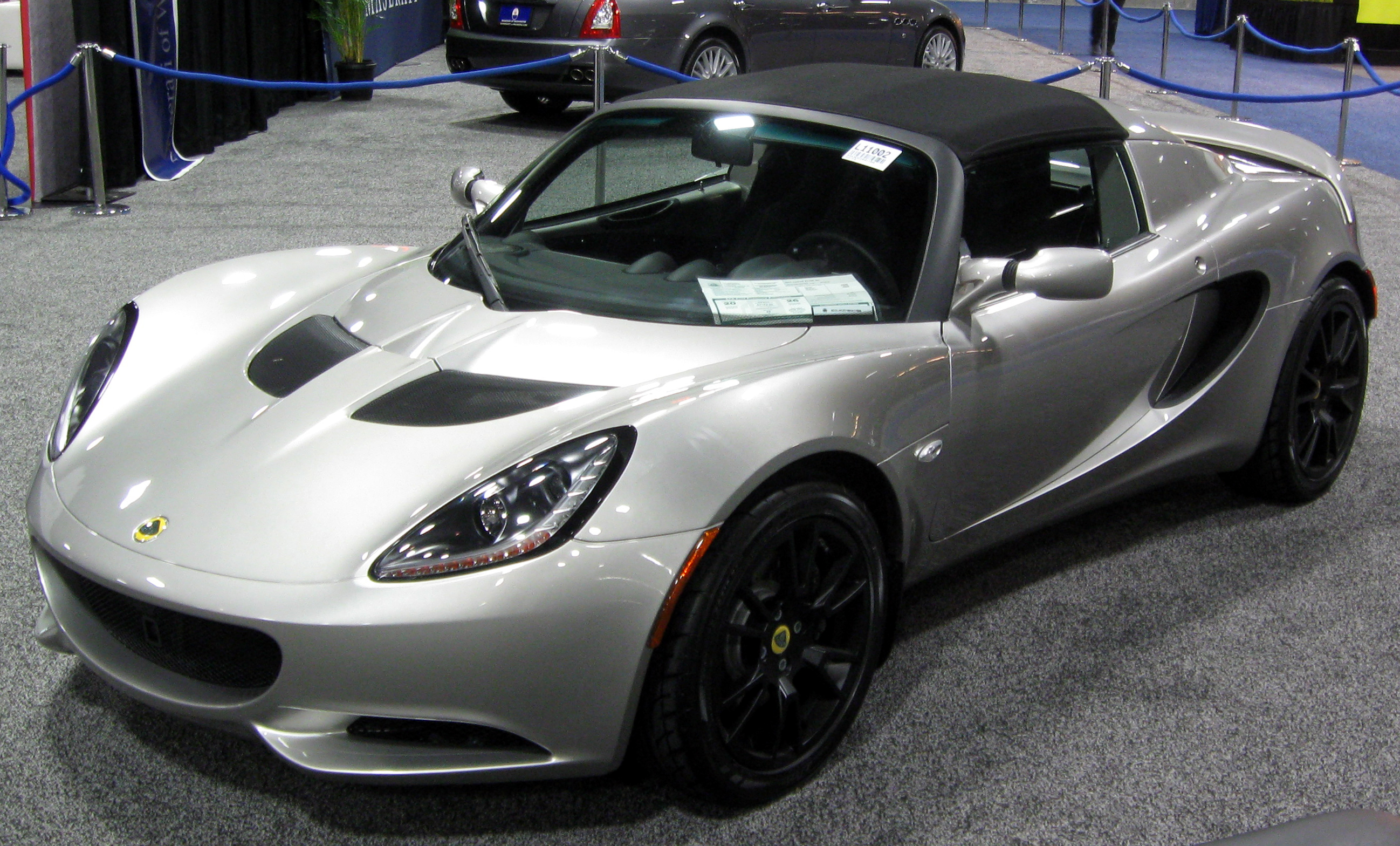
2011 Lotus Elise SC (US)
