= Lotus 340R =

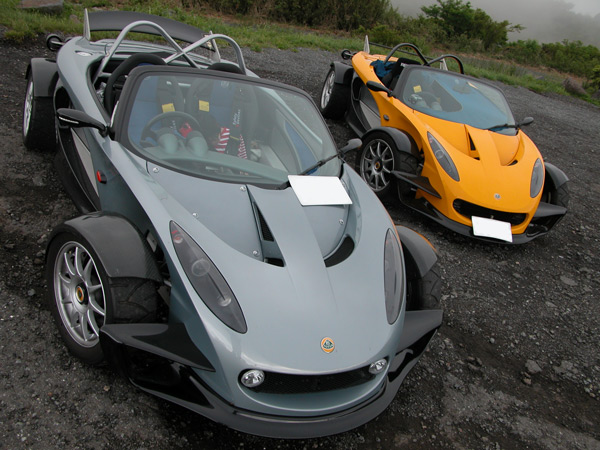
- Two 340Rs

Overview
- Manufacturer: Lotus Cars
- Production: 2000
- Assembly: United Kingdom: Hethel, Norfolk, England
- Designer: Russell Carr

Body and chassis
- Layout: MR layout
- Related: Lotus Elise

Powertrain
- Engine: 1.8 L Rover K-series I4
- Transmission: 5 speed Rover PG1 manual

Dimensions
- Length: 142.2 in (3.61 m)
- Kerb weight: 701 kg (1,545 lb)

Chronology
- Successor: Lotus 2-Eleven

The Lotus 340R is a limited edition sports car manufactured by Lotus Cars in 2000 at their Hethel factory.

== Overview ==
Originally introduced as a concept car at the 1998 British International Motor Show, the 340R is a special edition of the Lotus Elise. 340 were built, and all were sold before they were manufactured. It uses a custom built bodyshell with no roof or doors. All cars came with a silver and black colour scheme although some of them were painted in several OEM colours. Special A038R tyres were developed for the 340R in collaboration with Yokohama and the evolution of this bizarre tread pattern and soft compound continued with the A048 (its successor) offered on the Elise S2 111R and Exige S2 240 and used as a rain tire in spec events.

== Engine ==
The engine is a four-cylinder version of the 1.8L Rover K-Series engine called VHPD (Very High Power Derivative) used in the regular Elise which produces 177 bhp (132 kW; 179 PS) at 7800 rpm and 172 N⋅m (127 lbf⋅ft) at 6750 rpm as standard, or 187 bhp (139 kW; 190 PS) at 7500 rpm and 189 N⋅m (139 lbf⋅ft) at 5600 rpm with optional Lotus accessories. The former can accelerate to 60 mph from a standstill in 4.4 seconds and has a top speed of 133 mph (214 km/h).

== Specifications ==
- 0-160 km/h (99 mph) 10.7 sec
- Power-to-weight ratio: 252.5 bhp (188.3 kW)/ton or 3.96 kg (8.73 lb)/bhp
- Price: £35,000

== Gallery ==
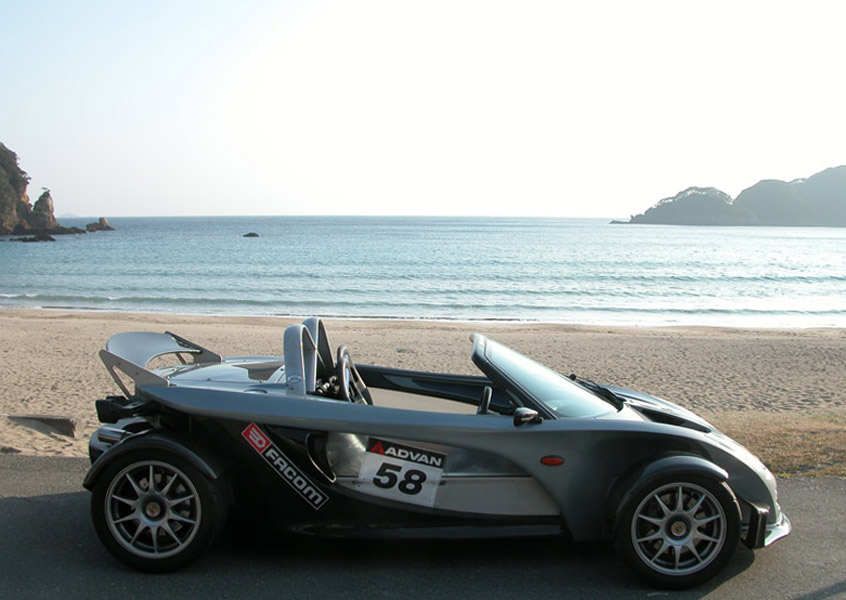
Side view of a 340R

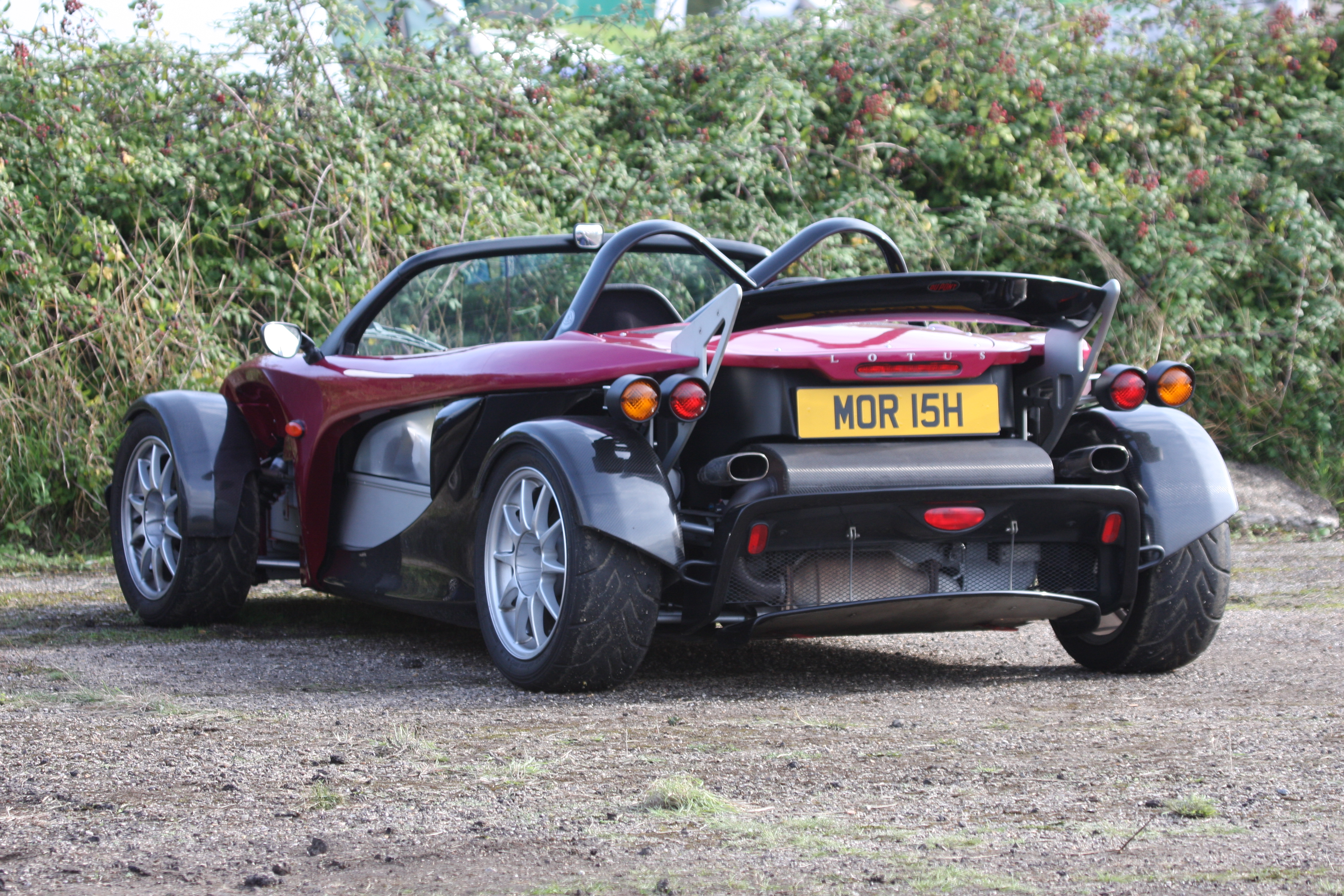
Rear view

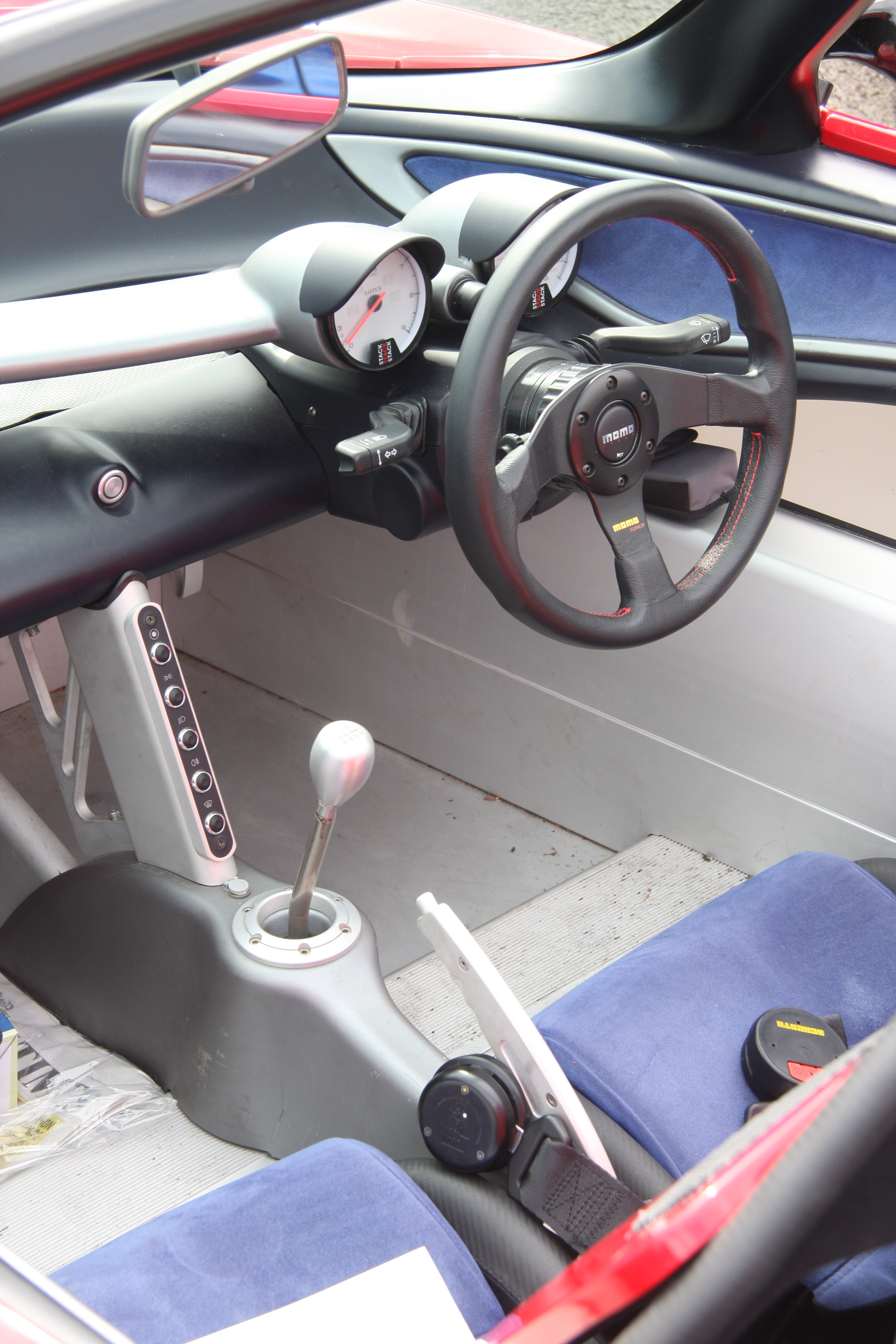
Interior
