= Lotus 2-Eleven =

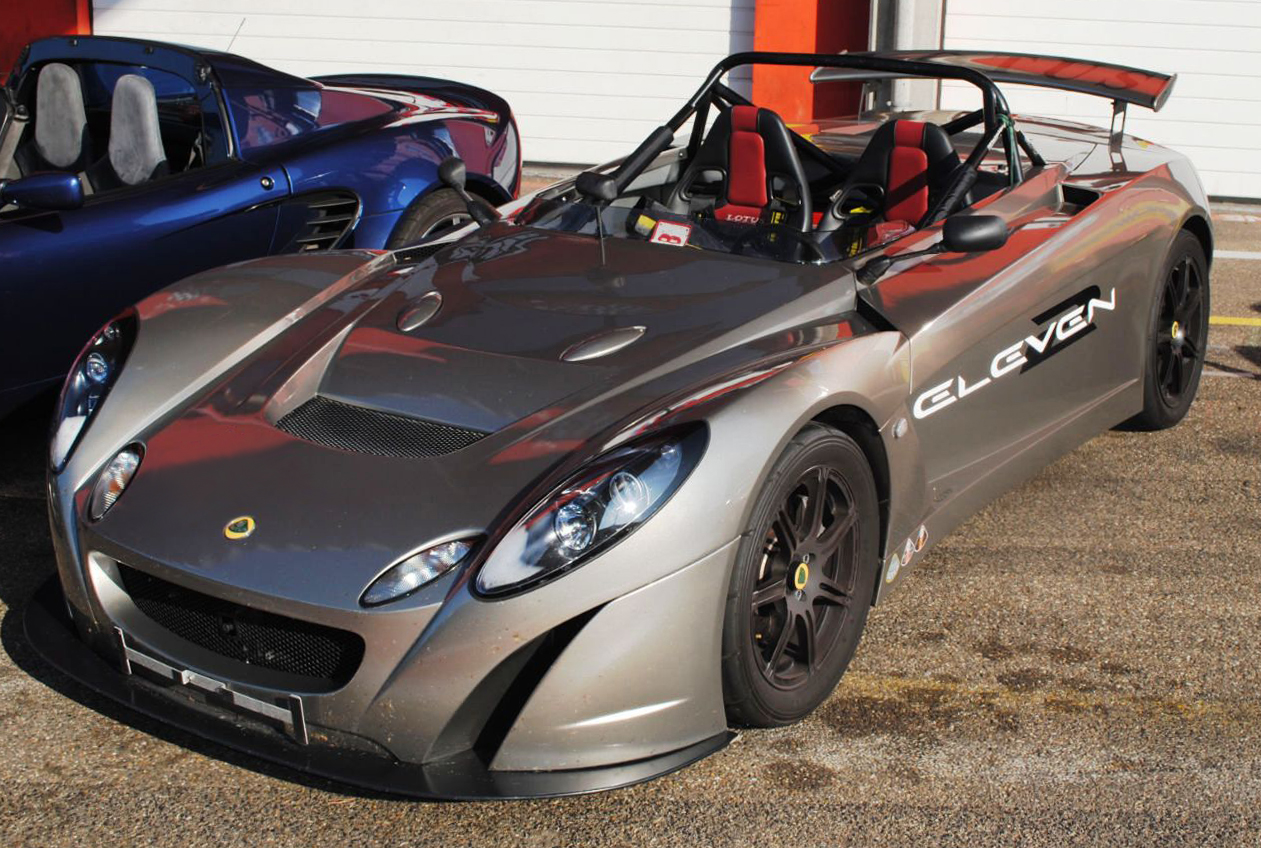

Overview
- Manufacturer: Lotus Cars
- Production: 2007–2011
- Assembly: United Kingdom: Hethel, Norfolk, England

Body and chassis
- Layout: Transverse mid-engine, rear-wheel drive
- Related: Lotus Elise; Lotus Exige

Powertrain
- Engine: 1.8 L Toyota 2ZZ-GE supercharged I4
- Transmission: 6-speed manual

Dimensions
- Wheelbase: 2,300 mm (90.6 in)
- Length: 3,822 mm (150.5 in) (road car)
- Width: 1,735 mm (68.3 in)
- Height: 1,112 mm (43.8 in)
- Kerb weight: 670 kg (1,477 lb) (road car)

Chronology
- Predecessor: Lotus 340R
- Successor: Lotus 3-Eleven

The Lotus 2-Eleven is a car produced by British car manufacturer Lotus. It is based on the Lotus Exige S, and thus has the same Toyota 2ZZ-GE with VVTL-i, Eaton M62 Roots-type supercharger and intercooled inline-four engine. Weighing 670 kg (1,477 lb), with 252 bhp (255 PS; 188 kW) at 8,000 rpm and 242 N⋅m (178 lb⋅ft) at 7,000 rpm of torque, the 2-Eleven can accelerate from 0-60 mph (97 km/h) in 3.8 seconds and has a top speed of 150 mph (241 km/h). Intended as a track day car, it costs £39,995, though for an additional £1,100 Lotus will make the car fully road legal.

Slight differences exist between the track and road versions, where the track car is slightly longer, at 3,872 mm (152.4 in) and lighter at 666 kg (1,468 lb).

== Gallery ==
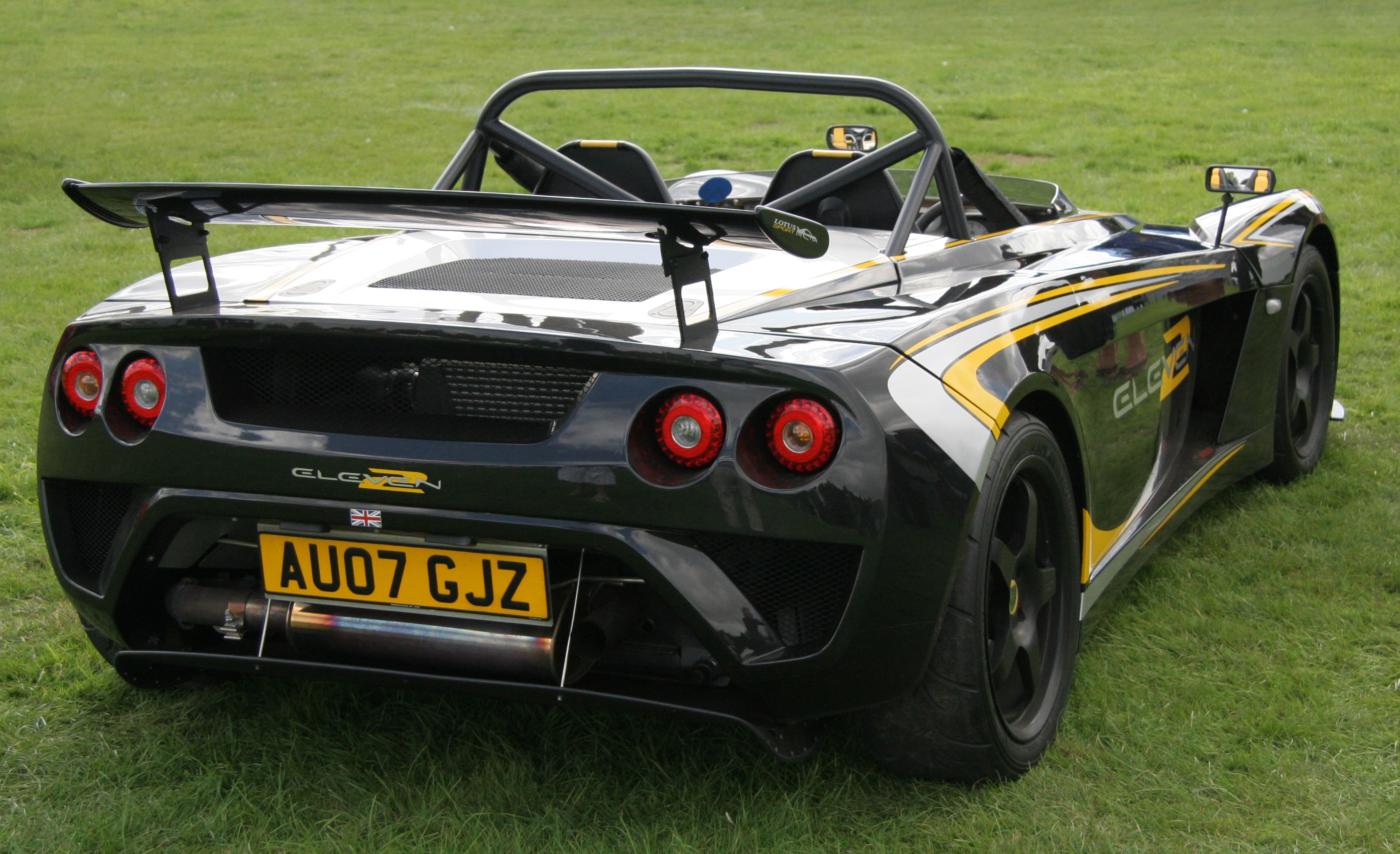
Rear view

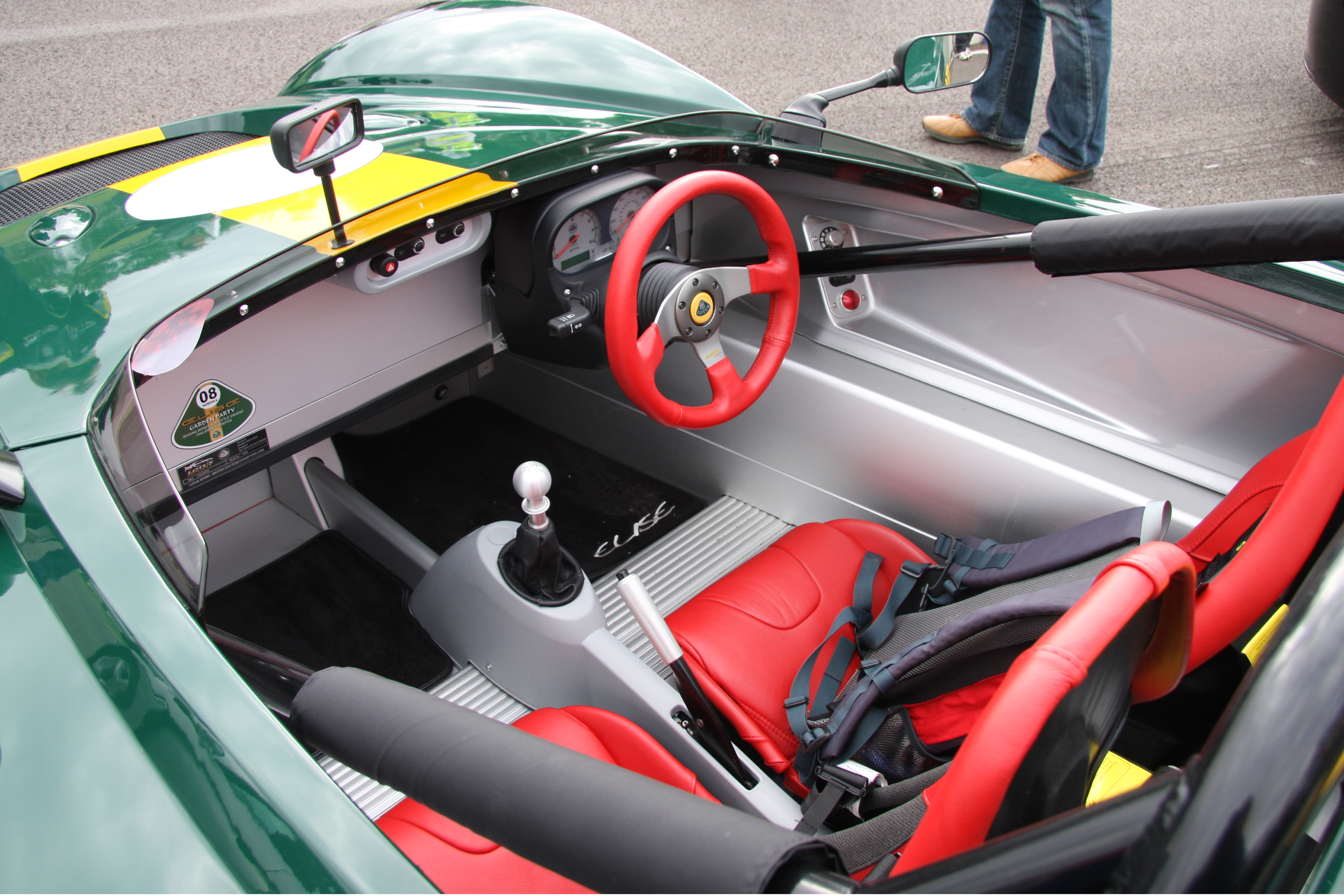
Interior
