= Lotus 3-Eleven =

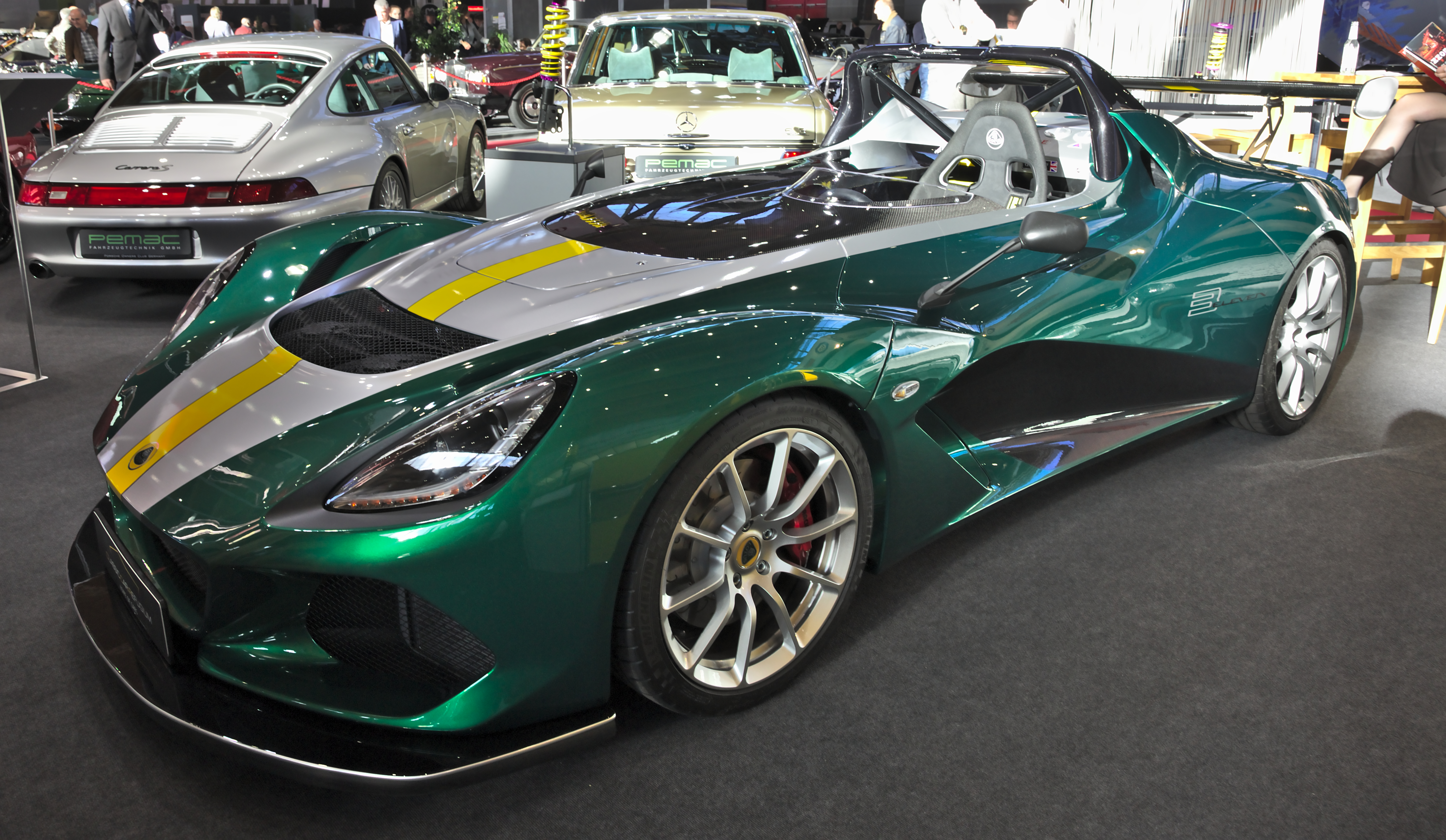

Overview
- Manufacturer: Lotus Cars
- Production: 2015–2018 (3-Eleven; 311 produced); 2018–2019 (3-Eleven 430; 20 produced)
- Model years: 2016
- Assembly: United Kingdom: Hethel, Norfolk, England
- Designer: Russell Carr

Body and chassis
- Class: Sports car (S) / Race car
- Body style: 0-door speedster
- Layout: Transverse mid-engine, rear-wheel drive
- Related: Lotus Evora; Lotus Exige (Series 3)

Powertrain
- Engine: 3.5 L Toyota 2GR-FE supercharged V6
- Transmission: 6-speed Aisin AI manual (road version); 6-speed Aisin AI IPS sequential (race version)

Dimensions
- Length: 4,120 mm (162.2 in)
- Width: 1,860 mm (73.2 in)
- Height: 1,200 mm (47.2 in)
- Kerb weight: 925 kg (2,039 lb) (road version); 890 kg (1,962 lb) (race version)

Chronology
- Predecessor: Lotus 2-Eleven

The Lotus 3-Eleven is a sports car produced by British car manufacturer Lotus Cars. The car is available as a racing version as well as a normal road legal version.

Unveiled at the Goodwood Festival of Speed in 2015, it was launched in 2016 at a price of £82,500 for the road version (plus VAT) (£116,500 (including VAT) for the race version) and limited to a production run of 311 units worldwide.

In February 2018, the road version received cosmetic and mechanical updates like the rest of the Lotus line up for the final run of production with engine power increased to 430 hp (436 PS; 321 kW) and performance similar to the race version. The upgraded car is known as the 3-Eleven 430.

== Specifications and performance ==
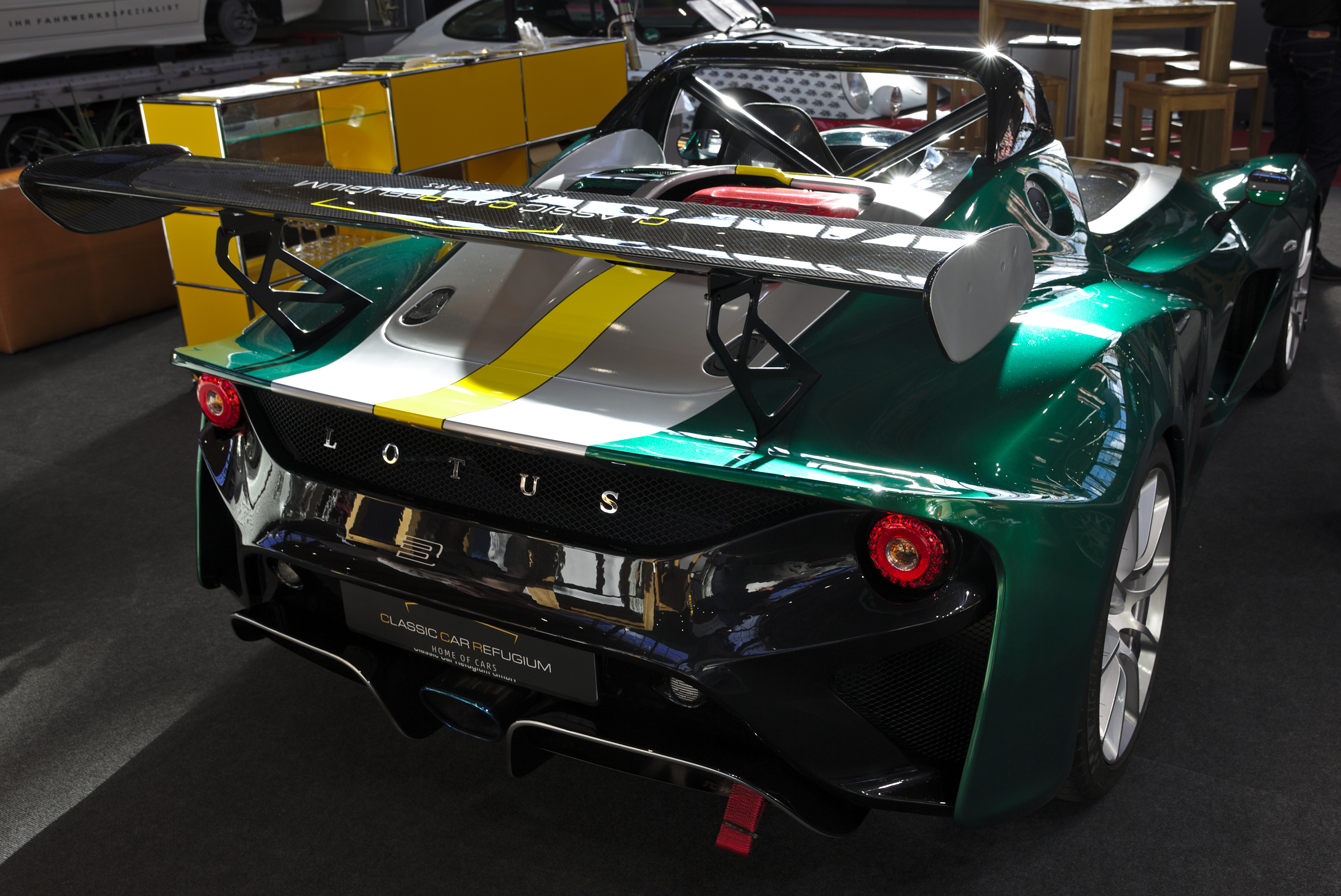
Rear view

The 3-Eleven is available in two configurations; a road legal version and a race version. The car has a mid-mounted engine configuration and comes with a 3.5 L (3,456 cc) Toyota 2GR-FE V6 engine coupled with an Edelbrock Roots-type supercharger. The engine is similar to the one found in the Lotus Evora, but with variable power outputs, producing 410 bhp (416 PS; 306 kW) at 7,000 rpm and 410 N⋅m (302 lb⋅ft) of torque at 3,000 rpm in the road version, and with engineering changes and software revisions to produce 460 bhp (466 PS; 343 kW) at 7,000 rpm and 525 N⋅m (387 lb⋅ft) at 3,500 rpm in the race version. Both versions of the car have different transmissions; a 6-speed manual transmission is available for the road version and a paddle operated 6-speed sequential manual transmission is available for the race version. Acceleration times also vary with the road version having a 0–62 mph (0–100 km/h) acceleration time of 3.3 seconds and the race version having an acceleration time of 2.9 seconds which is achieved due to a reduction in dry weight by 35 kg (77 lb). Both versions have a top speed of 180 mph (290 km/h).

A more powerful and track focused version of the road car was launched in February 2018 dubbed the 3-eleven 430 edition, having an increase in the power output to 430 hp (436 PS; 321 kW) and performance now similar to the racing version.
