= Rezvani Vengeance =

Overview
- Manufacturer: Rezvani Motors
- Production: 2022-present
- Assembly: United States: Santa Ana, California
- Designer: Milen Ivanov

Body and chassis
- Class: Full-size SUV
- Body style: 5-door SUV
- Layout: Front-engine, rear-wheel-drive; Front-engine, four-wheel-drive

Powertrain
- Engine: 6.2 L V8 Petrol; 3.0 L I6 Diesel
- Transmission: 10-speed automatic

Dimensions
- Wheelbase: 145.8 in (3,703 mm)
- Length: 235.4 in (5,979 mm)
- Width: 92.4 in (2,347 mm)
- Height: 80.9 in (2,055 mm)
- Curb weight: 6,200 lb (2,812 kg) (standard); 7,010 lb (3,180 kg) (B4 Armor); 8,200 lb (3,719 kg) (B6+ Armor)

The Rezvani Vengeance is a full-size off-road SUV produced by Rezvani Motors since 2022. It has off-road capabilities and comes with a Military Package trim that comes with body armor, blinding lights, pepper spray, and bullet-resistant windows.

== History ==
In October 2022, the American company Rezvani Motors presented the Vengeance as a large SUV with military styling and off-road capability. The Vengeance was positioned in the market as the largest and most expensive vehicle based on the Cadillac Escalade luxury SUV. Milen Ivanov, a digital artist who had previously designed vehicles for video games, designed the Vengeance to look like a vehicle in a game. The car has 35-inch tires suited to difficult off-road driving. The passenger compartment has the same dashboard as the Cadillac Escalade. The vehicle can transport eight passengers in three rows of seats.

The Vengeance is built to special order, and is priced at the top of the American company's range as a more expensive alternative to the Rezvani Tank. As of January 2023 the basic price is US$285,000, increasing to of $782,250 with all options.

== Specifications ==
Engine options are two 6.2-liter V8 petrol engines generating 420 bhp (313 kW) or 682 bhp (509 kW), and a 3-liter six-cylinder diesel engine with 277 bhp (207 kW), with optional four-wheel drive. A 10-speed automatic transmission from Cadillac is used.
