= Lotus Exige =

Model of sports car by Lotus, 2000–2021

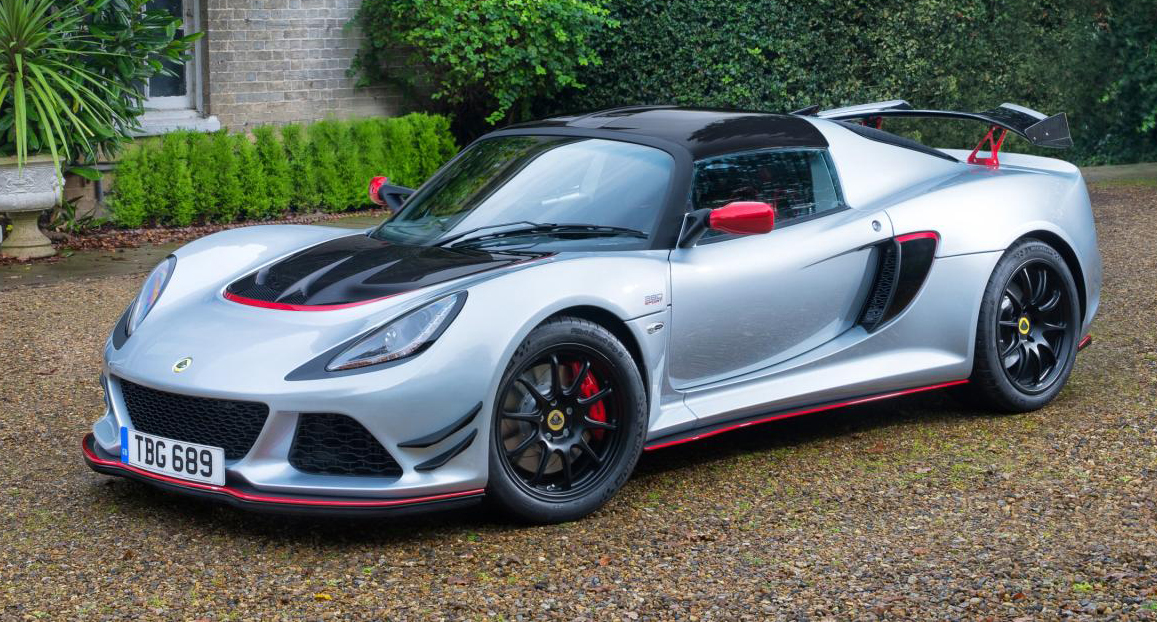
- Lotus Exige Sport 380 (Series 3)

Overview
- Manufacturer: Lotus Cars
- Production: 2000–2021; 10,497 produced
- Assembly: United Kingdom: Hethel, Norfolk

Body and chassis
- Class: Sports car (S)
- Body style: 2-door coupé; 2-door Targa top roadster
- Layout: Rear mid-engine, rear-wheel drive
- Platform: Lotus Elise
- Related: Lotus Elise; Vauxhall VX220; Rinspeed sQuba; Tesla Roadster; Hennessey Venom GT; Detroit Electric SP.01

Dimensions
- Kerb weight: 2,015 lb (914 kg); 2,593 lb (1,176 kg)

Chronology
- Successor: Lotus Emira

The Lotus Exige /ɛɡˈziːʒ/ is a sports car made by the British company Lotus Cars from 2000 until 2021. Originally a coupé version of the Lotus Elise roadster, since the Series 3 the Exige has been the larger-engined model of the family, featuring a V6 engine in place of the Elise's straight-four. Convertible versions of both models are available. Exige is French and means "demand"/"require".

== Series 1 ==
Series 1
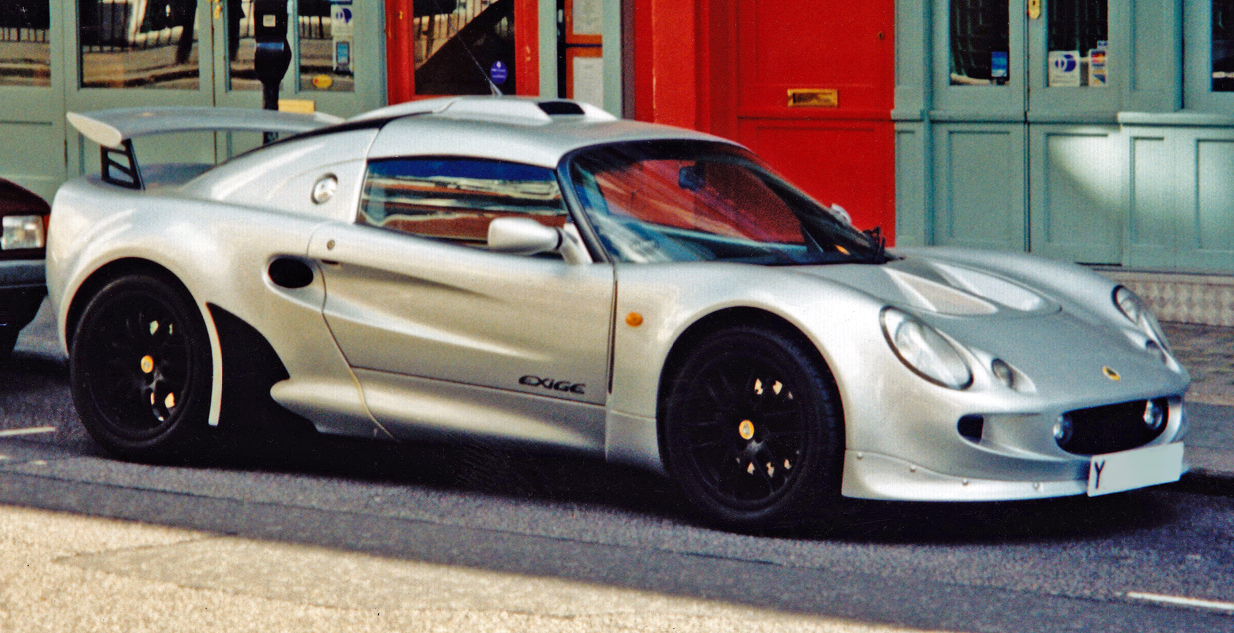

Overview
- Production: 2000–2001
- Designer: Julian Thomson

Body and chassis
- Related: Lotus 340R; Vauxhall VX220/Opel Speedster; Lotus Elise GT1; Lotus Elise

Powertrain
- Engine: 1.8 L Rover K-series I4
- Transmission: 5-speed Rover PG-1 manual

Dimensions
- Wheelbase: 2,300 mm (90.6 in)
- Length: 3,785 mm (149.0 in)
- Width: 1,719 mm (67.7 in)
- Height: 1,182 mm (46.5 in)
- Kerb weight: 780 kg (1,719.6 lb)

The original Exige was launched in 2000 with a naturally aspirated 1.8 L Rover K Series Inline-four engine in VHPD (Very High Performance Derivative) tune. It is rated at 177 hp (132 kW; 179 PS) at 7,800 rpm in standard form. There was also a "track spec" version with 190 hp (142 kW; 193 PS) available. The car has a five-speed manual gearbox, and a claimed top speed of 219 km/h (136 mph). 0–97 km/h (60 mph) was achieved in 4.7 seconds and 0–100 km/h (62 mph) in 4.9 seconds.

The first generation Exige bodywork was based on that of the Series 1 Elise, which was produced from 1996–2000, although the Elise was updated soon after the introduction of the Exige. The Exige added a non-removable hardtop, "fastback", kamm-tail style rear bodywork with a tinted transparent engine cover and a pylon-mounted rear wing. Front air intakes (blanked on the road cars) and a front splitter were added. Both front and rear bodywork clamshells were widened to accept a wider wheel track. The Series 1 was built until 2001. 604 examples in total were made and the car was not replaced until the Series 2 of 2004.

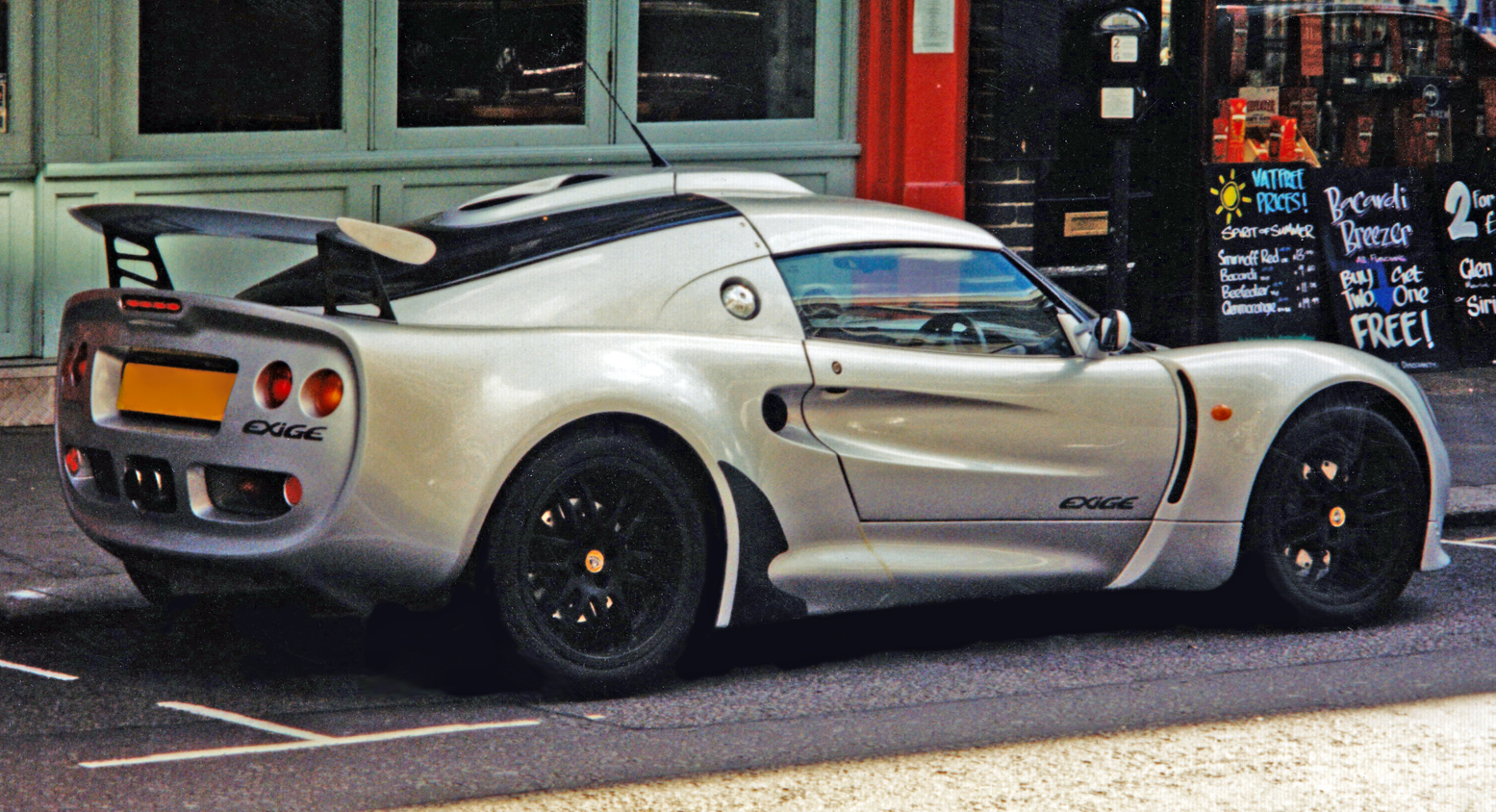
Rear view of Exige S1

== Series 2 ==
Series 2
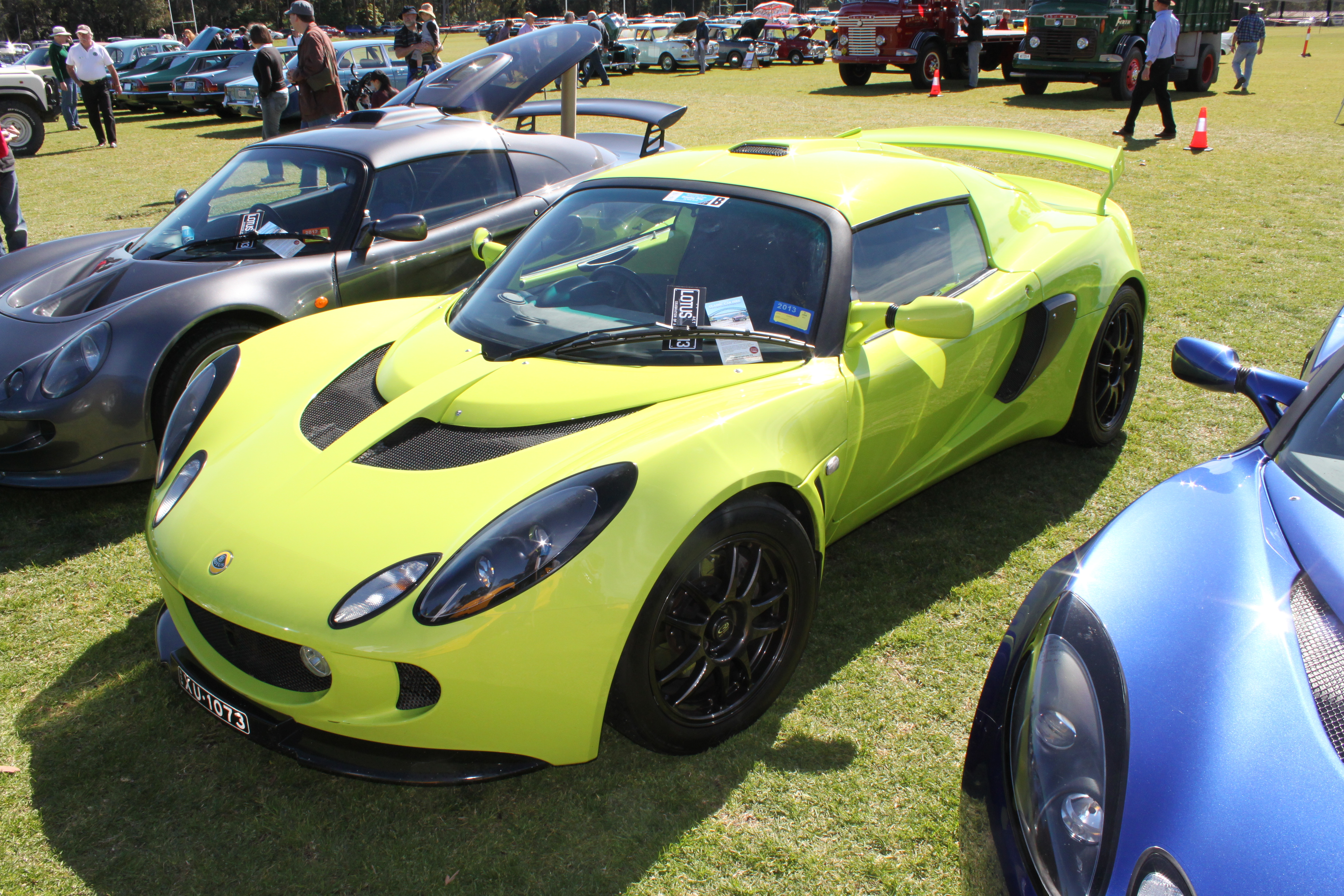

Overview
- Production: 2004–2011
- Designer: Steve Crijns

Body and chassis
- Related: Lotus Elise; Opel Speedster/Vauxhall VX220; Lotus 2-Eleven; Lotus Europa S Tesla Roadster; Hennessey Venom GT; Rinspeed sQuba

Powertrain
- Engine: 1.8 L Toyota 2ZZ-GE I4; 1.8 L Toyota 2ZZ-GE Supercharged I4
- Transmission: 6-speed manual

Dimensions
- Wheelbase: 2,300 mm (90.6 in)
- Length: 3,810 mm (150.0 in)
- Width: 1,730 mm (68.1 in)
- Height: 1,168 mm (46.0 in)

=== Exige (2004–2006) ===
In 2004, the Series 2 Exige was introduced. It features a naturally aspirated 1.8 L 16-valve DOHC Toyota/Yamaha engine that is rated at 190 hp (142 kW; 193 PS) with the Toyota engine designation of 2ZZ-GE. Compared to the Series 2 Elise, it has a front splitter, a fiberglass hardtop roof with roof scoop, a rear engine cover, and rear spoiler. The sole purpose of these aerodynamic additions to the base Elise is to create more downforce (almost 45 kg (100 lb) of downforce at 161 km/h (100 mph) in the Exige versus 5.9 kg (13 lb) at 161 km/h (100 mph) in the Elise).

In February 2005, Lotus announced a limited production run of 50 Exiges, using the Toyota engine with a supercharger. This increased the power output to 243 hp (181 kW; 246 PS). These models were only available in yellow or black, representing the colours of Lotus Sport, and are badged 240R. They have a projected 0–97 km/h (60 mph) time of 3.9 seconds and 0–161 km/h (100 mph) time of 9.9 seconds, with a top speed of 249 km/h (155 mph).

The North American Exige was unveiled at the Los Angeles Auto Show in January 2006.

According to Lotus, the standard Exige Series 2 model weighs 2,016 lb (914 kg) and has the following specifications:

Engine
Toyota supplied, 1,796 cc (1.8 L; 109.6 cu in) I4, DOHC with VVTL-i (variable valve timing with lift intelligence) - Designed by Yamaha - Engine Code: 2ZZ-GE
Bore/stroke 82 mm × 85 mm (3.23 in × 3.35 in)
190 hp (142 kW; 193 PS) at 7,800 rpm
138 lb⋅ft (187 N⋅m) at 6,800 rpm
Compression ratio: 11.5:1

Transmission
6-speed manual built by Aisin AI, close-ratio with single-plate dry clutch

Performance
0-97 km/h (60 mph): 4.7 seconds
0-161 km/h (100 mph): 12.9 seconds
Top speed: 237 km/h (147 mph)
Fuel consumption: 24 mpg_{‑imp} (12 L/100 km; 20 mpg_{‑US}) city / 29 mpg_{‑imp} (9.7 L/100 km; 24 mpg_{‑US}) highway

=== Exige S ===
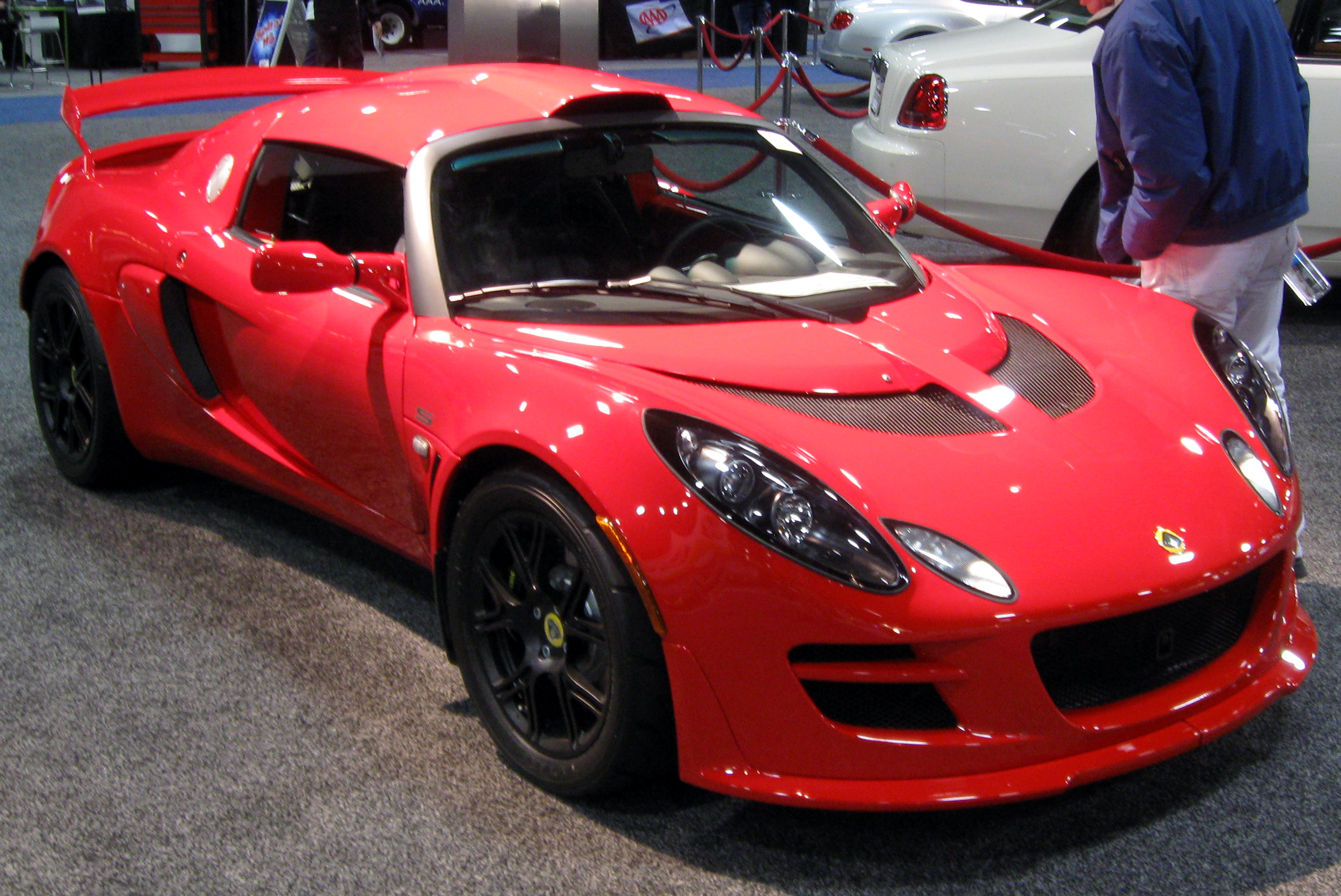
Lotus Exige S

In February 2006, Lotus announced the Exige S model which used a supercharged Toyota 2ZZ-GE engine rated at 220 hp (164 kW; 223 PS). The S was also made available in North American markets as a 2007 model.

According to Lotus, the Exige S model, weighing 2,057 lb (933 kg), has the following specifications:

Engine
Toyota supplied, 1,796 cc (1.8 L) I4, DOHC with VVTL-i (variable valve timing and lift - intelligent), supercharged and intercooled
Bore/stroke 82 mm × 85 mm (3.23 in × 3.35 in)
218 hp (163 kW; 221 PS) at 7,800 rpm
159 lbf⋅ft (215 N⋅m) at 5,500 rpm
Compression ratio: 11.5:1

Transmission
6-speed, close ratio with single-plate dry clutch

Performance
0-97 km/h (60 mph): 4.1 seconds
0-161 km/h (100 mph): 11.1 seconds
Top speed: 238 km/h (148 mph)
Fuel consumption: 24 mpg_{‑imp} (12 L/100 km; 20 mpg_{‑US}) city / 29 mpg_{‑imp} (9.7 L/100 km; 24 mpg_{‑US}) highway

=== Exige Sport 240 (2008) ===
In 2007, Lotus released the Exige Sport 240, limited to 6 units for the Australian market only. The output from the 1.8L Supercharged Inline-4 was increased to 179 kW (240 hp; 243 PS), a 10% increase over the Exige S, and 230 N⋅m (170 lb⋅ft) thanks to upgraded fuel injectors and a new engine control unit. 0–100 km/h (0-62 mph) times improved to 4.2 seconds, and the top speed increased to 249 km/h (155 mph). At the time, the Sport 240 was the fastest Lotus ever sold in Australia. The Sport 240 in fitted with Lotus Sport adjustable traction control, developed from the Lotus Sport UK GT3 motorsport program. The system features a driver-adjustable control knob with 18 different presets of traction control as well as electronic launch control. The Sport 240's brakes were also upgraded, with AP Racing four-piston callipers with 308 mm (12.1 in) two-piece vented discs and braided hoses on the front, and Brembo single-piston callipers with 288 mm (11.3 in) rotors in the rear. Pagid Racing brake pads are fitted all around. The suspension utilises one-way adjustable dampers with adjustable ride height and an adjustable front sway bar. The Sport 240 comes equipped with R compound Yokohama A048 LTS tyres, 195/50x16 in the front, and 225/45x17 in the rear. It also includes a BS4 T45 steel roll-over hoop and struts. The interior also receives its fair share of upgrades, including elements of a Touring Plus package. It comes with a lightened, 15 kg (33.1 lb) air conditioning system, sports seats finished in black leather with a harness bar. It features an orange Exige logo on the seats and floor mats, door trims, centre console and stitching. The car also received Lotus Sport forged 5-spoke OZ Racing alloy wheels, body mods including a roof scoop to supply more air to the intercooler, two bespoke colour choices (Blaze Orange and Sapphire Black), and limited edition badging. The Blaze Orange models received blacked out highlights including the front splitter, rear wing endplates, wheels and a rear beaver panel infill around the taillights. The Sapphire Black models received a Chrome Orange front splitter and rear wing endplates. The Sport 240 went on sale at the 2007 Australian International Motor Show at a price of $149,990.

=== Exige S 240 (2008–2011) ===
In 2008, the Exige S was replaced by the Exige S 240. Power output increased by 9% over the outgoing model to 240 hp (179 kW; 243 PS). The S 240 also received upgraded AP Racing brakes from the Exige Cup 240 and a larger roof scoop utilised by the Exige Cup 255. 0–97 km/h (0–60 mph) times improved to 4.0 seconds. The S 240 base manufacturer suggested retail price was $65,690.

=== Exige S 260 (2009–2011) ===
The Exige S 260 produced an additional 7% power output over the S 240 resulting in 260 PS (256 hp; 191 kW). Even with a full fuel tank, extensive use of weight-saving materials such as carbon fibre reduced the vehicle's gross weight to 916 kg (2,020 lb) compared to 942 kg (2,077 lb) in the S 240. It can accelerate from 0–97 km/h (0–60 mph) in 4.0 seconds. After 2009, both the S 240 and S 260 received distinctively new and enlarged rear spoilers mounted to the rear clam instead of the motor bay cover.

=== Exige 265E ===
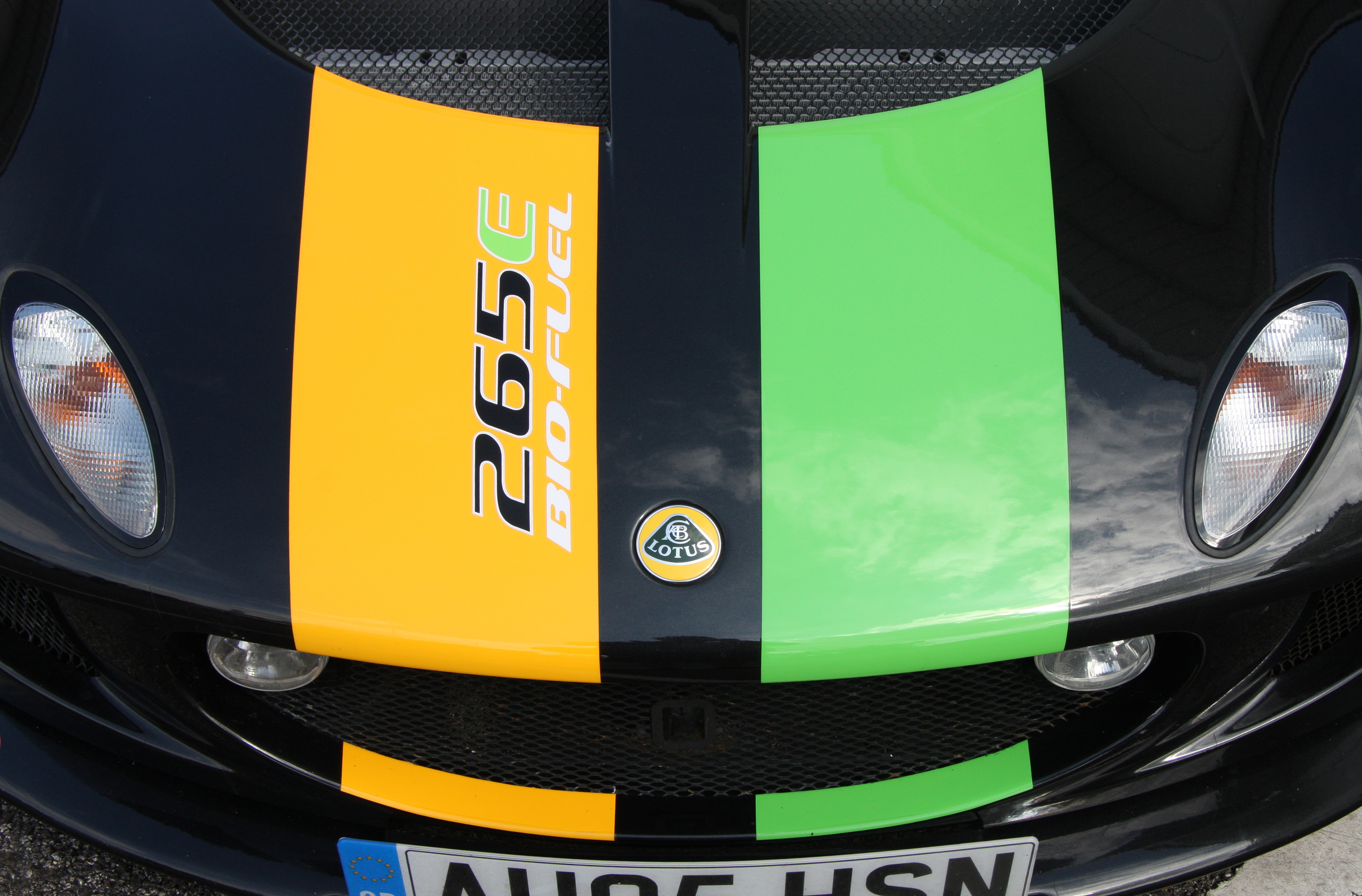
Exige 265E

The Exige 265E is a factory-built version of an Exige S optimised to run on E85 fuel, which is 85% ethanol. The higher octane of this biofuel allows for a higher compression ratio and/or more supercharger boost. In this model, which saw the ECU re-mapped as well as upgraded injectors and fuel pump to cope with the new fuel type, the brakes have also been upgraded to four-piston AP Racing callipers with increased diameter 310 mm (12.2 in) sport brake pads mated with drilled and vented discs at the front. Brembo single-piston sliding rear callipers with 282 mm (11.1 in) diameter discs are fitted at the rear. Lotus says it has no intention to build the 265E (265 indicates the approximate horsepower and the E indicates the "environmentally favourable bio-ethanol E85 fuel" powering the engine) as a limited number standard production car, and that it is simply a biofuels demonstrator. According to Lotus, the Exige 265E model has the following specifications:

Engine

Toyota supplied 2ZZ-GE 1,796 cc inline-4, DOHC with VVTL-i (variable valve timing with lift intelligence), supercharged and intercooled
Bore/stroke 82 mm/85 mm
264 hp (197 kW) at 8,000 rpm
184 lb⋅ft (249 N⋅m) at 5,500 rpm
Compression ratio: 11.5:1

Transmission
C64 6-speed, close ratio with single-plate dry clutch

Exige 265E performance

0-60 (0-97 km/h): 3.88 seconds
0-100 mph (0-161 km/h): 9.2 seconds
Top speed: 158 mph (254 km/h)
Fuel consumption: ~25 miles per imperial gallon (11 L/100 km; 21 mpg_{‑US}) city / 65 miles per imperial gallon (4.3 L/100 km; 54 mpg_{‑US}) highway

=== Exige GT3 prototype (2007) ===
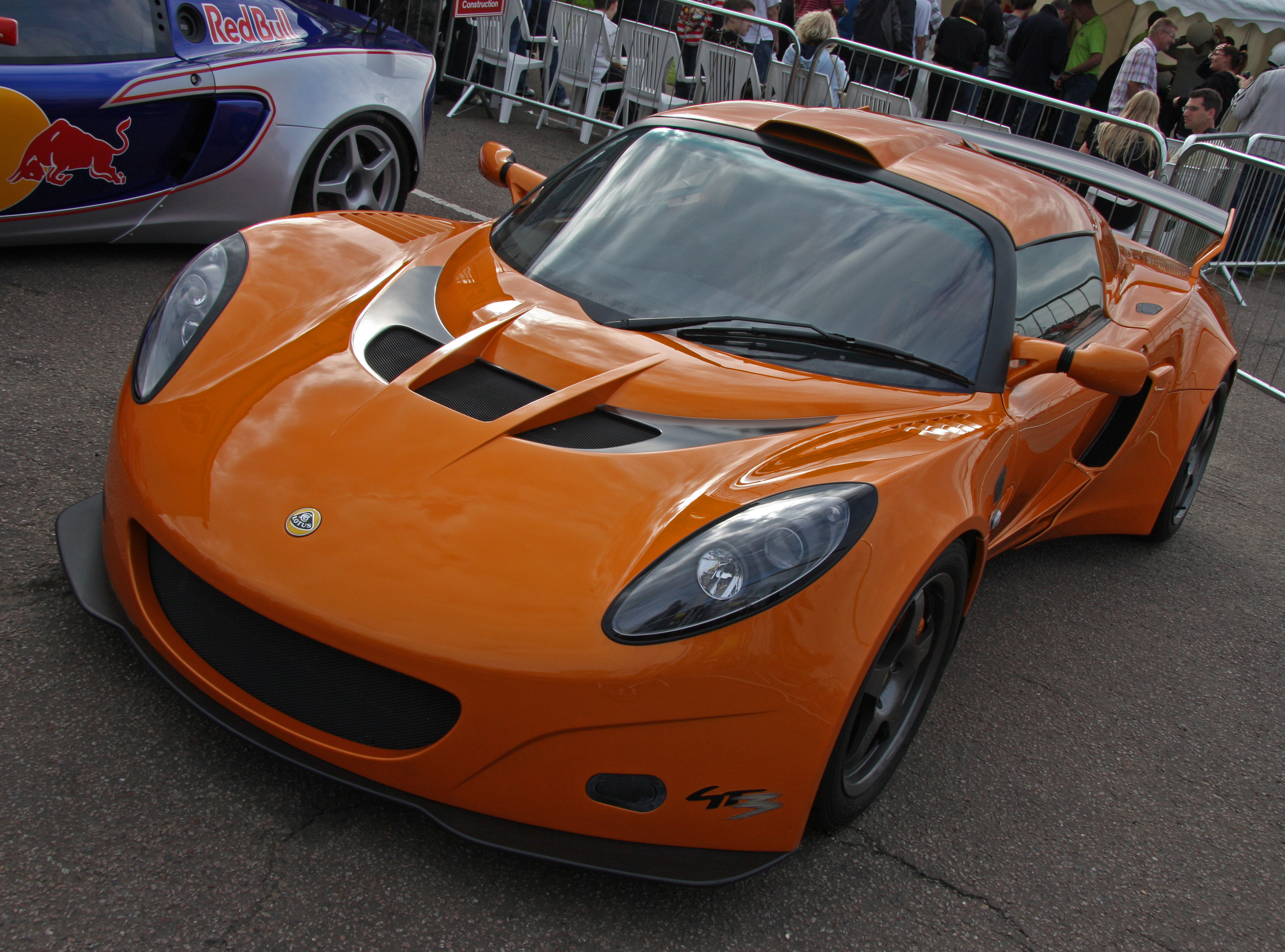
Exige GT3 Road Car

According to Lotus, the Exige GT3 model has the following specifications:

Engine

Toyota supplied 2ZZ-GE, 1,796 cc (1.8 L; 109.6 cu in) inline 4, DOHC with VVTL-i and Lotus T4e engine management system, Eaton M62 Roots type supercharger and intercooled
Bore/stroke 82 mm × 85 mm (3.23 in × 3.35 in)
275 PS (202 kW; 271 hp) at 8,000 rpm
250 N⋅m (184 lb⋅ft) at 7,000 rpm
Compression ratio: 11.5:1

Transmission
C64 6-speed, close ratio with uprated clutch and cover, open differential
Gear ratios I/II/III : 3.166:1 / 2.050:1 / 1.481:1
IV/V/VI : 1.166:1 / 0.916:1 / 0.815:1
R/final drive : 3.250:1 / 4.529:1

Performance
0-97 km/h (60 mph) : 3.9 seconds
0-100 km/h (62 mph) : 4.0 seconds
0-161 km/h (100 mph) : 9.8 seconds
Top speed : 257 km/h (160 mph) - electronically limited
Power-to-weight ratio : 362.3 hp (270 kW; 367 PS) per tonne

=== Exige GT3 of Angelo Lazaris (2008–2011) ===
The Angelo Lazaris is a version of the Exige GT3 for the 2008 GT Championship, based on the European race car that competed in the FIA GT3 category. It featured the 1.8-litre engine based on the Exige S road car rated at 355 PS (261 kW; 350 hp) at 7,000 rpm and 305 N⋅m (225 lb⋅ft) at 6,000 rpm, increased frontal area to accommodate the wider track, revising the front radiator inlet and outlet areas, reducing the cross-sectional areas of both, extending the nose forward by approximately 3 cm (1 inch), bodywork extending 8 cm rearward, widening 10 cm (3.9 inches) and losing almost 3 cm in height at the rear deck, body parts produced in lightweight ZPREG carbon fibre using an innovative mould-making process that features room temperature curing rather than an oven, elimination of roof scoop that fed cooling air to the engine's intercooler, change to a water-to-air intercooler.

The vehicle was unveiled in round three of the 2008 GT Championship.

=== Union Jack Lotus Exige S (2008) ===
The Union Jack is a version of Lotus Exige S with a flying British flag body, developed by Lotus Design.

The car was featured in Discovery Channel's How Do They Do It? series.

=== Exige Scura/Stealth (2009) ===
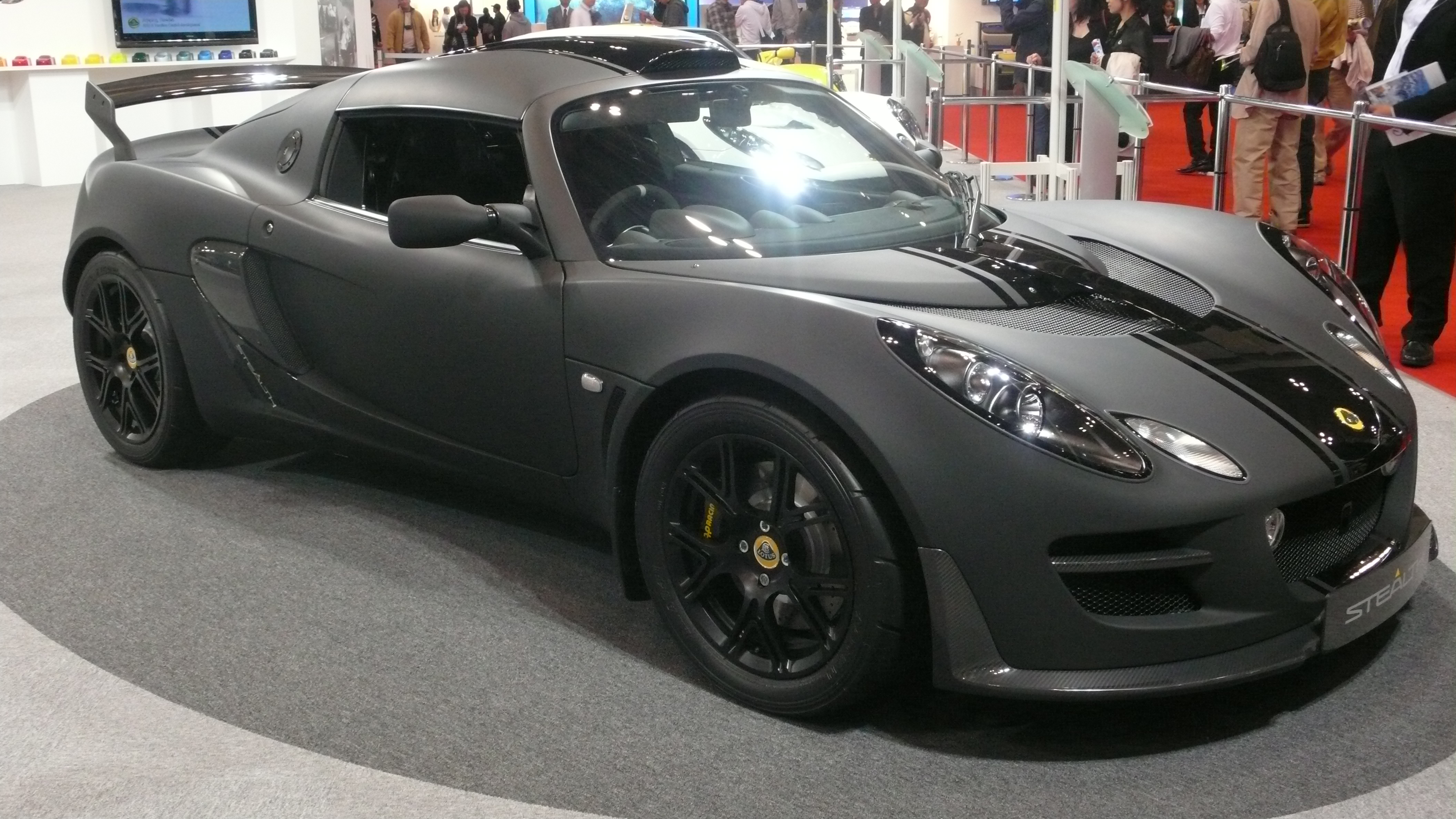
Lotus Exige Stealth at the Tokyo Motor Show 2009

The Stealth is a limited production run version of the Lotus Exige S with 1,796 cc (1.8 L; 109.6 cu in) supercharged and intercooled Inline-4 engine from Exige Cup 260 rated at 260 PS (191 kW; 256 bhp) at 8,000 rpm and 236 N⋅m (174 lb⋅ft) of torque at 6,000 rpm, matte black body colour, Phantom Black triple stripes that run the length of the car, carbon-fibre front splitter, oil cooler inlet vanes, side air scoops and rear spoiler, seats and centre console made from carbon fibre, anodised handbrake and gear knob in anthracite colour, carbon-fibre components in high-gloss clear lacquer finish, Lotus Launch Control, Lotus Traction Control, variable-slip traction control, Öhlins 2-way adjustable dampers, Eibach Springs with variable-height spring platforms, matt black lightweight forged wheels with Yokohama 048 LTS tyres, ride height adjustment to reduce the ride height from 130 mm (5.12 in) to 120 mm (4.72 in), lightweight flywheel, sports-type clutch plate, heavy-duty clutch cover, C64 six-speed gearbox (with an aluminium casing) and Accusump (engine oil accumulator unit).

Orders for the 'Lotus Exige Scura' began from 21 October 2009 in Europe, South Korea, Australia, South Africa, Thailand, Taiwan, Hong Kong, Singapore, New Zealand, Indonesia and Malaysia. The vehicle was sold in Japan as 'Lotus Exige Stealth'.

The Exige Stealth was unveiled at the 2009 Tokyo International Motorshow.

=== Lotus Exige S RGB Special Edition (2010) ===
The RGB Special Edition is a version of the Lotus Exige S commemorating Roger Becker, the former Director of Vehicle Engineering for Lotus. It includes Toyota's supercharged 1.8 litre 2ZZ VVTL-i engine rated at 260 PS (191 kW; 256 hp), Lotus ultra lightweight forged alloy wheels, Performance pack, Sport pack, Touring pack, choice of four body colours (Aspen White, Starlight Black, Solar Yellow & Carbon Grey), Roger Becker's signature on the rear of the car, a Roger Becker numbered plaque, monochrome Lotus badges, structural shear panel (which increases the lateral stiffness of the rear subframe by 30%) and air conditioning.

The vehicle went on sale in September 2010, and ended at the end of 2010 in Europe due to changes in legislation and the introduction of "Euro 5" Type Approval which does not apply to vehicles with 1.8-litre 2ZZ VVTL-i engines.

The RGB Special Edition was unveiled at the 2010 LA Auto Show.

=== Exige Matte Black Final Edition (2011) ===
The Final Edition is a limited version of the Lotus Exige for the North American market, commemorating the end of the Exige's production. It includes an engine rated at 261 PS (192 kW; 257 hp), matte black body colour, black Alcantara sport seats and a uniquely numbered plate for each car. A total of 25 were made.

The Final Edition was unveiled at Pebble Beach Week 2011.

=== Production ===
Production of the North American version of the Exige ended in August 2011 after the expiration of "smart" airbags exemption, and due to Toyota stopping production of its 2ZZ-GE four-cylinder engine.

=== Exige S 260 Final Edition (2011) ===
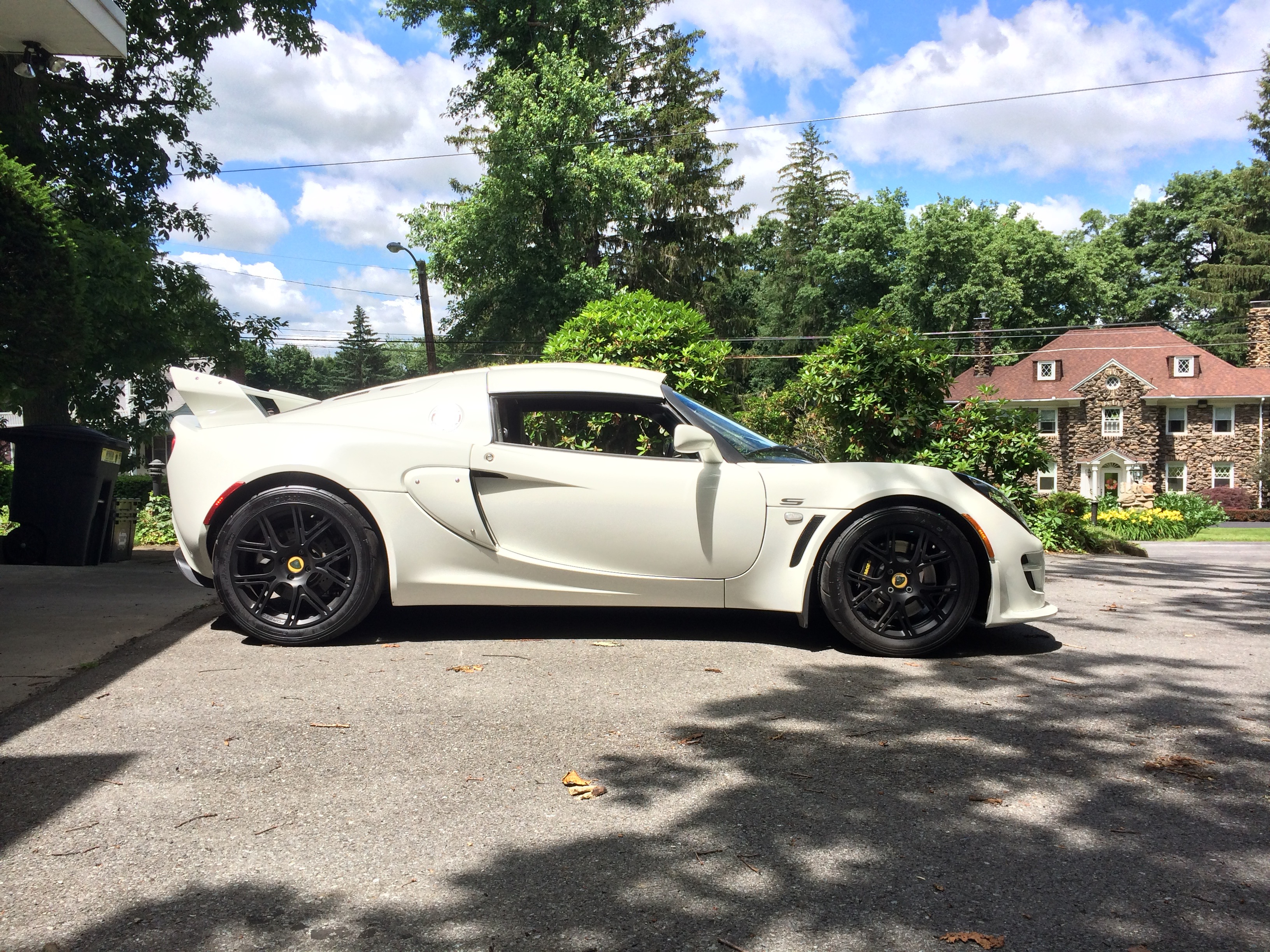
Lotus Exige S 260 Final Edition#9 of 30 in Aspen White

To mark the end of an era of Lotus Exige production, Lotus created the Exige S 260 Final Edition, exclusively for North America. With power upgraded to 257 hp, and a high level of standard equipment, the Exige S 260 Final Edition was available in multiple colour choices from the full Lotus colour range. Only 30 examples of this Exige were built.

==== Specifications ====
- Engine: 1.8 litre Toyota Supercharged 2ZZ-GE Inline-4 with VVTL-i
- Transmission: 6-speed Toyota C62 manual
- Power: 257 bhp (192 kW; 261 PS) at 8000 rpm
- Torque: 236 N⋅m (174 lb⋅ft) at 6000 rpm
- Acceleration: 0-60 mph (97 km/h) in 4.1 seconds
- Top speed: 152 mph (245 km/h)
- Weight: 916 kg (2,019 lb)
- Full Lotus exterior colour range was available (standard & metallic paints at no extra cost, lifestyle & limited paints at an extra cost).
- Three-element rear wing, splitter, side scoops and roof scoop.
- Body coloured rear wing, splitter, side scoops and roof scoop.
- Double shear track control arm brace.
- Y type 5-spoke forged alloy wheels in black finish (6" Front, 7.5" Rear).
- Limited Slip Differential (LSD)

==== Upgrade options included ====
- Sport Pack: ProBax sport seats, Lotus Traction Control System (TCS), BS4 T45 steel roll-over hoop and struts and Adjustable front anti-roll bar.
- Touring Pack: padded leather door panels, perforated leather door inserts, leather trimmed centre console, black perforated leather handbrake-lever gaiter, black carpet mats with embroidered Exige logo, noise insulation material, iPod stereo connection and trinket tray divider and cup holder.
- Track Pack: Track suspension (Ohlins dampers and adjustable ride height)

== Series 3 ==
Series 3
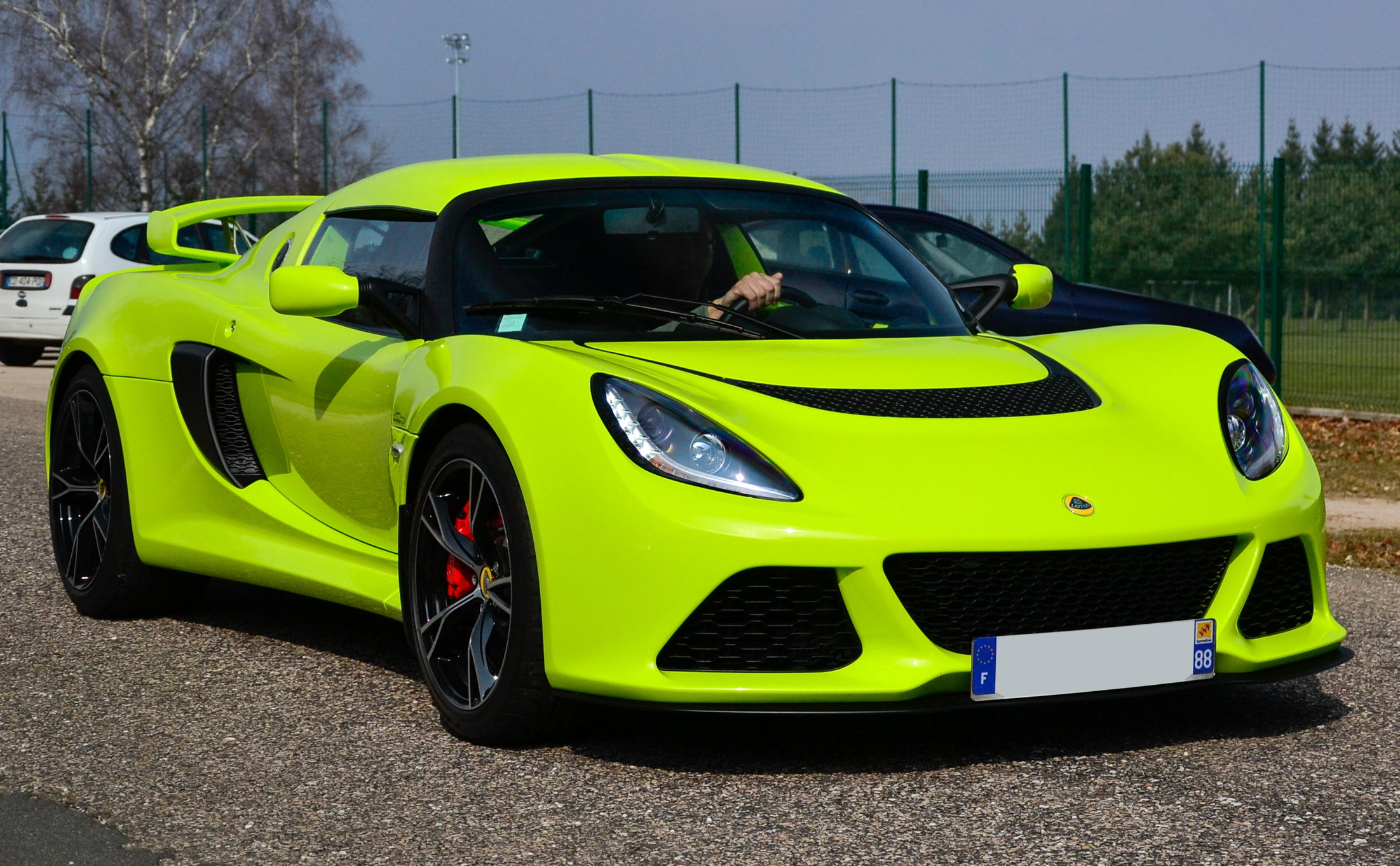

Overview
- Production: 2012–2021
- Designer: Julian Thomson

Body and chassis
- Related: Lotus Elise; Rezvani Beast Alpha X Blackbird

Powertrain
- Engine: 3.5 L Toyota 2GR-FE V6; 3.5 L Toyota 2GR-FE Supercharged V6
- Transmission: 6-speed manual

Dimensions
- Wheelbase: 2,372 mm (93.4 in)
- Length: 4,084 mm (160.8 in)
- Width: 1,802 mm (70.9 in)
- Height: 1,130 mm (44.5 in)

=== Exige S V6 (2012–2015), Exige S V6 Roadster (2013–2016) ===
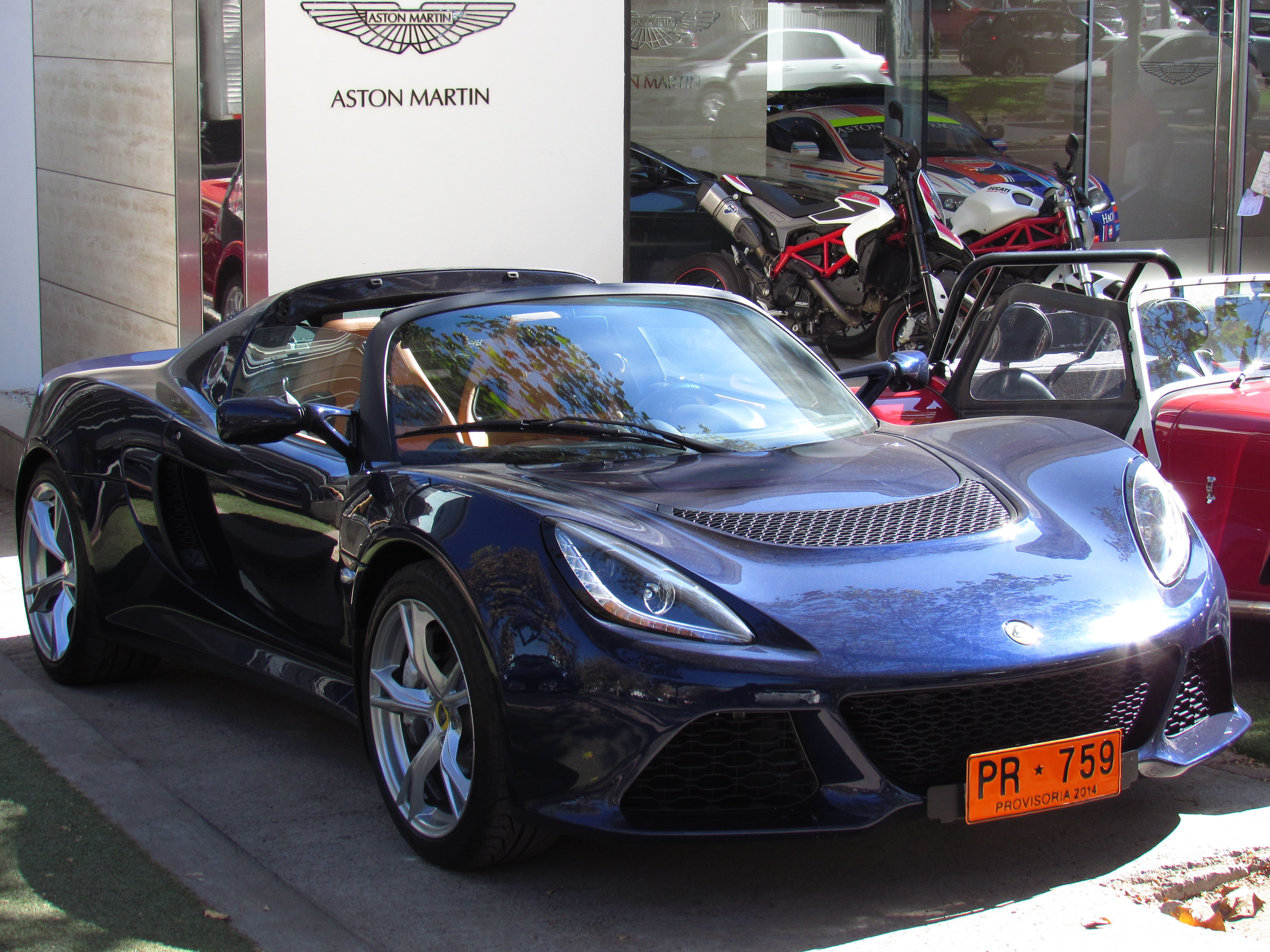
Lotus Exige V6 Roadster

At the 2011 Frankfurt Motor Show, the 2012 version of the Exige S was announced. It features a supercharged 3.5 litre V6 engine (from the Evora S) rated at 345 hp (257 kW; 350 PS). In 2013, a roadster version was introduced with only minor changes to the design for the removable top. The engine and performance were virtually unchanged from the coupe.

==== Specifications ====
- Powerplant: 3,456 cc (3.5 L; 210.9 cu in) Toyota 2GR-FE Supercharged non-intercooled V6 engine
- Max. power: 345 hp (350 PS; 257 kW) at 7,000 rpm
- Max. torque: 400 N⋅m (295 lb⋅ft) at 4,500 rpm.
- Gearbox: 6-speed Toyota EA60 manual transmission; automatic transmission available as an option.
- Weight: 1,176 kg (2,593 lb).
- Acceleration: 0–60 mph (97 km/h) in 3.8 seconds; 3.9 seconds for automatic version.
- Top speed: 172 mph (277 km/h)
- Tyres: Pirelli P Zero Corsa tyres included as standard with optional £800 Pirelli Trofeo R tyres.

To accommodate the V6 engine, the new model is approximately 25 cm (9.8 inches) longer and 5 cm (2.0 in) wider (exterior bodywise) than the model with the inline-four engine, being 4,052 mm (159.5 inches) long, 1,802 mm (70.9 in) wide (not counting the mirrors) and 1,130 mm (44.5 in) tall. The drag coefficient is 0.433.

=== Exige V6 Cup, Exige V6 Cup R (2013–2016) ===
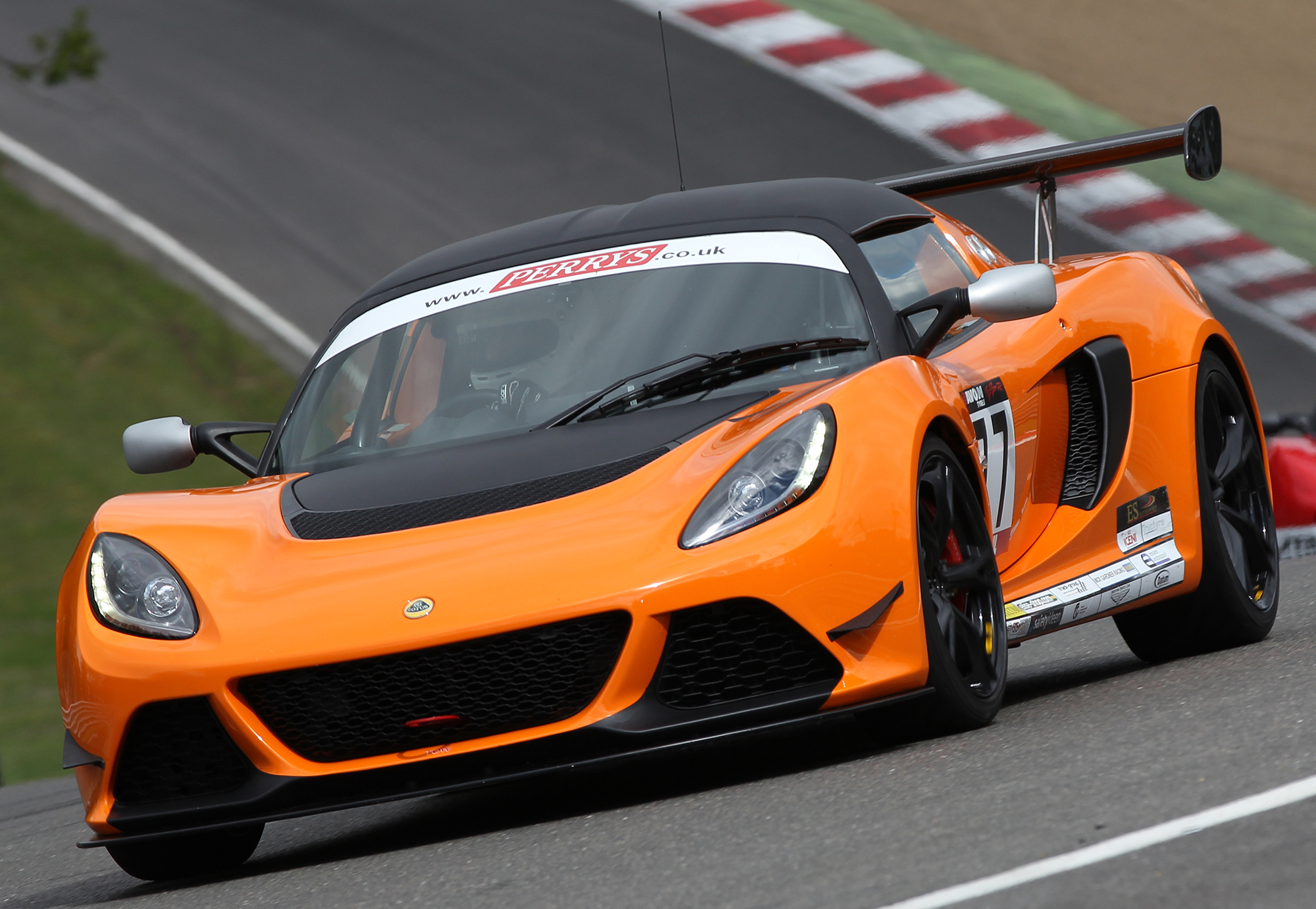
Lotus Exige V6 Cup-R

The Exige V6 Cup is a track oriented version of the Exige S while the Exige Cup R is the track-only version of Exige V6 Cup. The Exige V6 Cup is offered for sale in the United States as a track only car. If purchased, US Lotus Dealers will only provide a bill of sale instead of a title. The vehicles were unveiled at the 2013 Autosport International motor show.

==== Specifications ====
Exige V6 Cup According to Lotus, the Exige Cup has the following specifications:

- Engine: 3.5 litre Toyota DOHC V6 VVT-i, 24-valve, equipped with Harrop HTV 1320 supercharger producing 345 hp (350 PS) and 400 N⋅m (295 lb⋅ft) of torque at 7,000 rpm.
- Transmission: 6-speed Toyota EA60 close ratio manual transmission, Sequential gearbox with paddle shift (optional).
- Layout: Mid mounted, transverse, rear wheel drive.
- Weight: 1,110 kg (2,447 lb).
- Acceleration: 0-60 mph (97 km/h) in 3.8 seconds.
- Top speed: 170 mph (274 km/h).
- Suspension: Double wishbone suspension with anti-roll bars (front and rear).
- Brakes: AP Racing four-piston callipers (front and rear) with ventilated and cross drilled 2 piece discs.
- Tyres: Pirelli P Zero Corsa tyres included as standard

Exige V6 Cup R The Lotus Exige V6 Cup R has the following specifications according to Lotus:

- Engine: 3.5 litre Toyota DOHC V6 VVT-i, 24-valve, equipped with Harrop HTV 1320 supercharger producing 366 PS (361 hp; 269 kW) and 413 N⋅m (305 lb⋅ft) of torque at 7,200 rpm.
- Transmission: 6-speed Toyota EA60 close ratio manual transmission, Sequential gearbox with paddle shift (optional).
- Layout: Mid mounted, transverse, rear wheel drive.
- Weight: 1,040 kg (2,293 lb) (dry weight).
- Acceleration: 0-60 mph (97 km/h) in 3.8 seconds.
- Top speed: 170 mph (274 km/h).
- Suspension: Double wishbone suspension with anti-roll bars (front and rear).
- Brakes: AP Racing four-piston callipers (front and rear) with ventilated and cross drilled 2 piece discs.
- Tyres: Pirelli P Zero Corsa tyres included as standard

=== Lotus Exige S LF1 Limited Edition (2014–2015) ===
The Exige LF1 was launched at the 2014 Canary Wharf MotorExpo. It celebrates the company's Formula One heritage. A total of 81 cars were made, each one corresponding to a Formula One victory over the course of the 40 year history Lotus has in the sport.

In their official press release Lotus announced "The Lotus Exige LF1 brings to life the iconic black and gold livery of the 1970s and 1980s."

Finished in Motorsport Black with red and gold tri-stripes, painted red detailing to the rear wing, front splitter and mirror plinths. Sport seats in ebony leather with black technical fabric Inserts and gold contrast stitching and piping. Gold embroidered Lotus roundel to the headrest and Lotus F1 Team logo to the seat back. Exclusive carbon fibre 'Lotus Performance' engine plate. Black and gold Lotus nose badge and wheel centres.

Every car has an individually numbered carbon fibre build plate showing the details of the victory number the which it represents. Car #1 commemorating Lotus' first Formula one victory at Monaco in 1960 to car #81 marking Kimi Räikkönen's win in Australia in 2013.

'Race Pack' is standard with four mode Lotus dynamic performance management system (DPM), launch control, exhaust bypass valve override switch and optimised suspension. 'Premium Pack' is also standard on the LF1 which adds features such as air conditioning. 'Convenience Pack' is optional with trinket tray divider, USB connection and cup holder. Other options available are heated seats and rear parking sensors.

Lotus CEO Jean-Marc Gales stated "Lotus' DNA is borne of the Formula one [sic] arena and with 65 years of motorsport racing experience, 40 of those in F1 [sic] it's fitting we celebrate our sporting origins and our race successes with the new Exige LF1. 81 limited edition cars, each one an acknowledgement to each of Lotus' 81 Grand Prix wins, this car is intended for the truest of Lotus' racing fans."

=== Lotus Exige 360 Cup (2015) ===
Limited to 50 examples, Lotus Exige 360 Cup was revealed on 14 August 2015. The car is powered by a 3.5-liter supercharged Toyota V6 delivering 355 hp (360 PS; 265 kW). On the outside, these Exiges wear new lightweight pieces for the front access panel and louvered rear tailgate. The rest of the body uses the V6 Cup's aero package that produces 93 pounds of downforce at 100 mph. Improved brake discs are hidden behind Motorsport Red wheels, and each car comes with a numbered build plate. They're eligible to race in the Lotus Cup series, and for those really wanting to hit the track, the options include adjustable anti-roll bars, Öhlins dampers, a fire extinguisher, electrical cut-off, FIA carbon seats, air conditioning, and a removable steering wheel.

==== Specifications ====
The Exige 360 Cup has the following specifications as stated by Lotus:

- Engine: 3.5 litre Toyota DOHC V6 VVT-i, 24-valve, equipped with a Harrop HTV 1320 supercharger producing 350 PS (345 hp; 257 kW) and 400 N⋅m (295 lb⋅ft) of torque at 7,000 rpm.
- Transmission: 6-speed Toyota EA60 close ratio manual transmission, Sequential gearbox with paddle shift (optional).
- Layout: Mid mounted, transverse, rear wheel drive.
- Weight: 1,120 kg (2,469 lb) (dry weight).
- Acceleration: 0-60 mph (97 km/h) in 3.8 seconds.
- Top speed: 170 mph (274 km/h).
- Suspension: Double wishbone suspension with anti-roll bars (front and rear).
- Brakes: AP Racing four-piston callipers (front and rear) with ventilated and cross drilled 2 piece discs.
- Power to weight ratio: 307 hp/tonne (311 PS/1000 kg).

=== Lotus Exige Sport 350 (2015–2019), Sport 350 Roadster (2016–2019) ===
Revealed on 9 December 2015, the Lotus Exige Sport 350 is the replacement for the Exige S. It is lighter and faster than the Exige S, and was the next step on Lotus CEO Jean-Marc Gales' ladder to recovery for the British sports car maker. The Toyota 3.5-litre supercharged V6 underneath is unchanged, still producing 345 hp (350 PS; 257 kW) at 7,000 rpm and 400 N⋅m (295 lb⋅ft) at 4,500 rpm. However, Lotus went through and stripped weight wherever possible, tweaking the chassis and generally fettling the entire package. The initial plan had been to fit the Evora's 400 bhp engine to the Exige, but doing so would have meant the engineers could not get the car below the 1,200 kg target weight set by Gales. Weight loss had been the key focus, with 51 kg taken out of the car, reducing the kerb weight to 1,125 kg. The manual gearbox has been heavily revised, giving more precise and quicker shifting. The gearshift mechanism uses lightweight machined and cast aluminium components which Lotus chose to leave exposed through an open-gate design, rather than hiding them within the transmission tunnel, further reducing weight.

The Roadster variant was revealed at the 2016 Geneva Motor Show. Like the coupé, it features a carbon fibre tailgate and side intakes, as well as a lightweight battery and engine mounts.

=== Lotus Exige Type 25 Limited Edition (2016–2021) ===
The Lotus Exige Type 25 is a limited edition of 25 units, 10 of which were right hand drive, paying tribute to Colin Chapman's legendary single-seater Lotus 25, driven by Jim Clark in 1963. Born from the collaboration between the Lotus factory and Road Racing Center, this exclusive version was only distributed in Europe for the best lotus EU customers. Often referred to as the "GT3 Touring of Exiges," it features all the body elements of the Cup and 380 Carbon Edition versions while retaining the original rear wing for a more understated look. Based on the second-generation Exige V6, it was one of the first to be delivered with the renowned open-gated gearbox. The Type 25, under the covers, is an Exige 430 Cup - the most extreme of all Exiges produced.

The Lotus Exige Type 25 is recognisable by a numbered plaque located in front of the passenger seat. It also incorporates aerodynamic carbon elements from the Cup versions, particularly the side skirts, front spoiler, mirrors, and rear bumper. All units are equipped with nearly every factory option, but what truly sets them apart is a unique special livery for each model. Unlike many other Lotus Exige V6s, all body elements, including the roof, are painted. A Lotus Exclusive decal kit has been added to distinguish each model. The Type 25 would later inspire the creation of the Exige Type 49 and Type 79, based on the 430 version.

=== Lotus Exige Sport 380 (2016–2021) ===
The Lotus Exige Sport 380 is a track focused and more powerful version of the Lotus Exige lineup. It was unveiled on 23 November 2016. Lotus' CEO, Jean-Marc Gales describes it as, "The Exige Sport 380 is so good, that it is no longer the best in class, it's now in a class of its own", and it fulfils this statement by taking on some of the powerful and expensive super cars both on the track and the streets. The 3.5-litre, supercharged V6 engine now produces 375 hp (380 PS; 280 kW) and 410 N⋅m (302 lb⋅ft) of torque with a 6500 rpm red line achieved by revised supercharger and ECU. It can accelerate from 0 to 60 mph (97 km/h) in 3.5 seconds and has a top speed of 178 mph (286 km/h). The interior is also stripped out and features necessary driver aids. The Exige Sport 380 weighs 1,076 kg (2,372 lb), due to the extensive use of carbon fibre on the exterior as well as the interior, the application of polycarbonate windows instead of traditional glass windows and a newly designed rear transom panel which features two rear lights instead of four.

=== Lotus Exige Cup 380 (2016–2021) ===
The Lotus Exige Cup 380 is a more hardcore variant of the Exige Sport 380. Performance of the car remains the same as the Sport 380 but it features more aero components and a larger rear wing to produce more downforce at high speeds. The Exige Cup 380 generates 200 kg (441 lb) of downforce at its maximum speed of 175 mph (282 km/h); the top speed is reduced due to excess downforce and more drag. It features a more stripped out interior in order to save weight and other light weight carbon fibre components, Lotus states a lowest possible dry weight of only 1,057 kg (2,330 lb).

=== Lotus Exige Cup 430 (2017–2021) ===
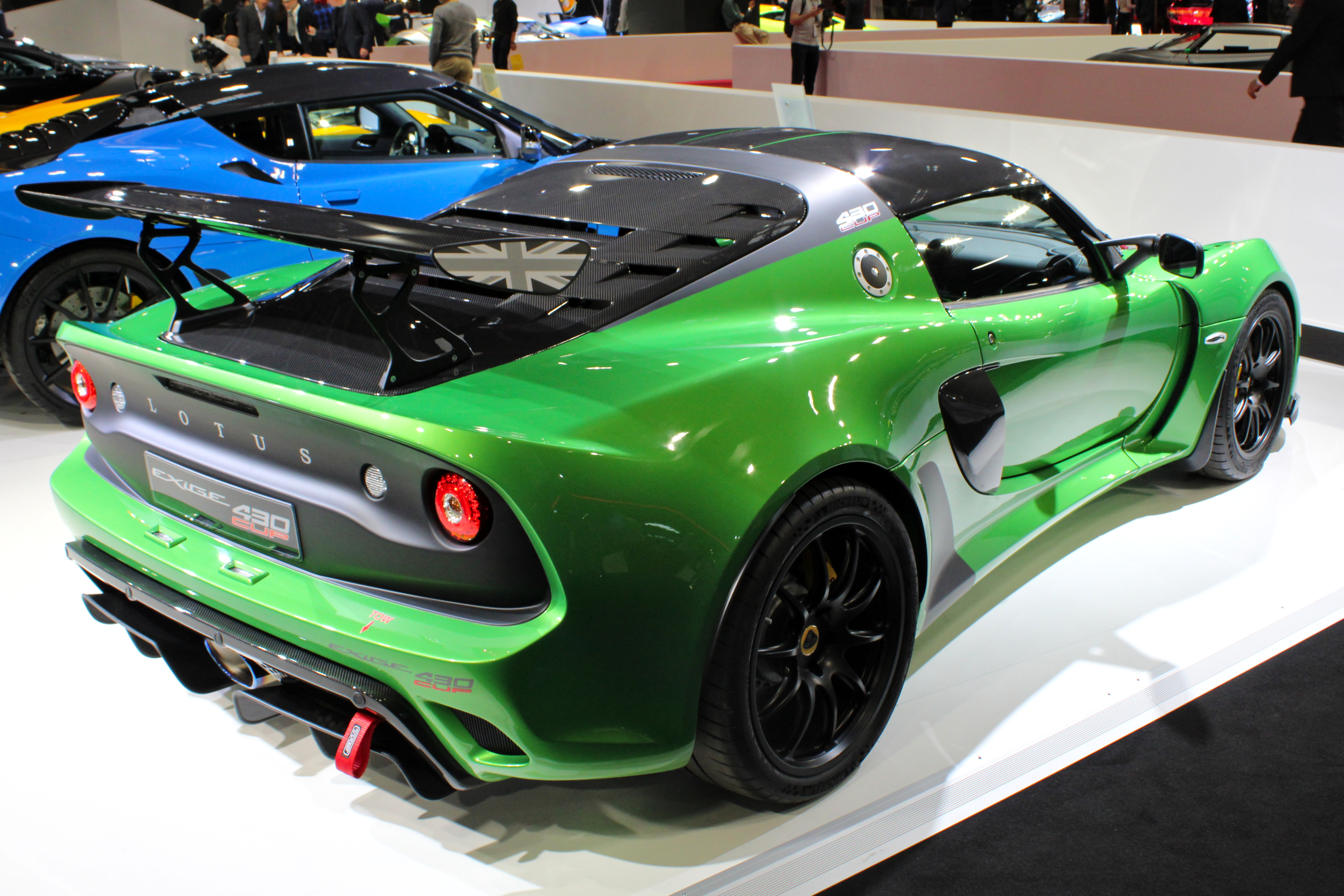
Lotus Exige Cup 430

On 9 November 2017, Lotus unveiled the most powerful version of the Exige to date called the Exige Cup 430, producing 430 PS (424 hp; 316 kW) and using the Evora GT430's powertrain, modified to fit in the smaller Exige. The car body can produce 220 kg (485 lb) of downforce. The Cup 430 is 19 kg (42 lb) lighter than the Sport 380 due to the use of carbon fibre in body panels and interior and a titanium exhaust. The gearbox allows quicker gearshifts than the previous model. The Cup 430 is not offered with an automatic gearbox.

==== Specifications ====
The Exige Cup 430 has the following specifications according to Lotus:

- Engine: 3.5 litre Toyota DOHC V6 VVT-i, 24-valve, equipped with an Edelbrock supercharger and a charge cooler producing 430 hp (436 PS; 321 kW) at 7,000 rpm and 440 N⋅m (325 lb⋅ft) of torque at 4,000 rpm.
- Transmission: 6-speed Toyota EA60 close ratio manual transmission with gearbox cooler coupled to Lotus developed aluminium precision shift mechanism.
- Layout: Mid mounted, transverse, rear wheel drive.
- Weight: 1,056 kg (2,328 lb) (lowest possible dry weight, after the removal of optional airbags).
- Acceleration: 0-60 mph (97 km/h) in 3.2 seconds.
- Top speed: 180 mph (290 km/h).
- Suspension: Double wishbone suspension with anti-roll bars (front and rear).
- Brakes: AP Racing four-piston callipers (front and rear) with ventilated and cross drilled 2 piece discs.
- Tyres: Michelin Pilot Sport Cup 2 tyres (front 215/45 R17, rear 285/30 R18).
- Power to weight ratio: 407 hp/tonne (413 PS/1000 kg).

=== Lotus Exige Sport 410 (2018–2021) ===
On 4 May 2018, Lotus unveiled the Exige Sport 410 to augment the current Exige lineup. It was meant to bridge the gap between the track-focused Exige Cup 430 and road-biased Exige Sport 350. It shares much of its running gear with the former. However, the settings have been dialled back to establish a suitable character for both road and track driving. Mid-mounted is the 430 Cup's, supercharged 3.5-litre V6 engine. However, it has been detuned to develop 410 hp (416 PS; 306 kW) and 420 N⋅m (310 lb⋅ft) of torque. The Exige Sport 410 is also fitted with a new front end, which will be applied across the Exige range. It features enlarged air intakes and new air curtains, which improve cooling efficiency and reduce drag respectively. Further aero-based addenda, including the front splitter, rear-wing and aluminium diffuser combine to generate 150 kg of downforce. The Exige Sport 410 uses carbon-fiber extensively for its construction, and weighed-in as the lightest V6 Exige to date at 1,054 kg (dry). It features the same suspension setup from the 430 Cup, comprising three-way adjustable Nitron dampers and Eibach anti-rolls bars, at both ends.

=== Lotus Exige Sport 390, Sport 420, Cup 430 Final Edition (2021) ===
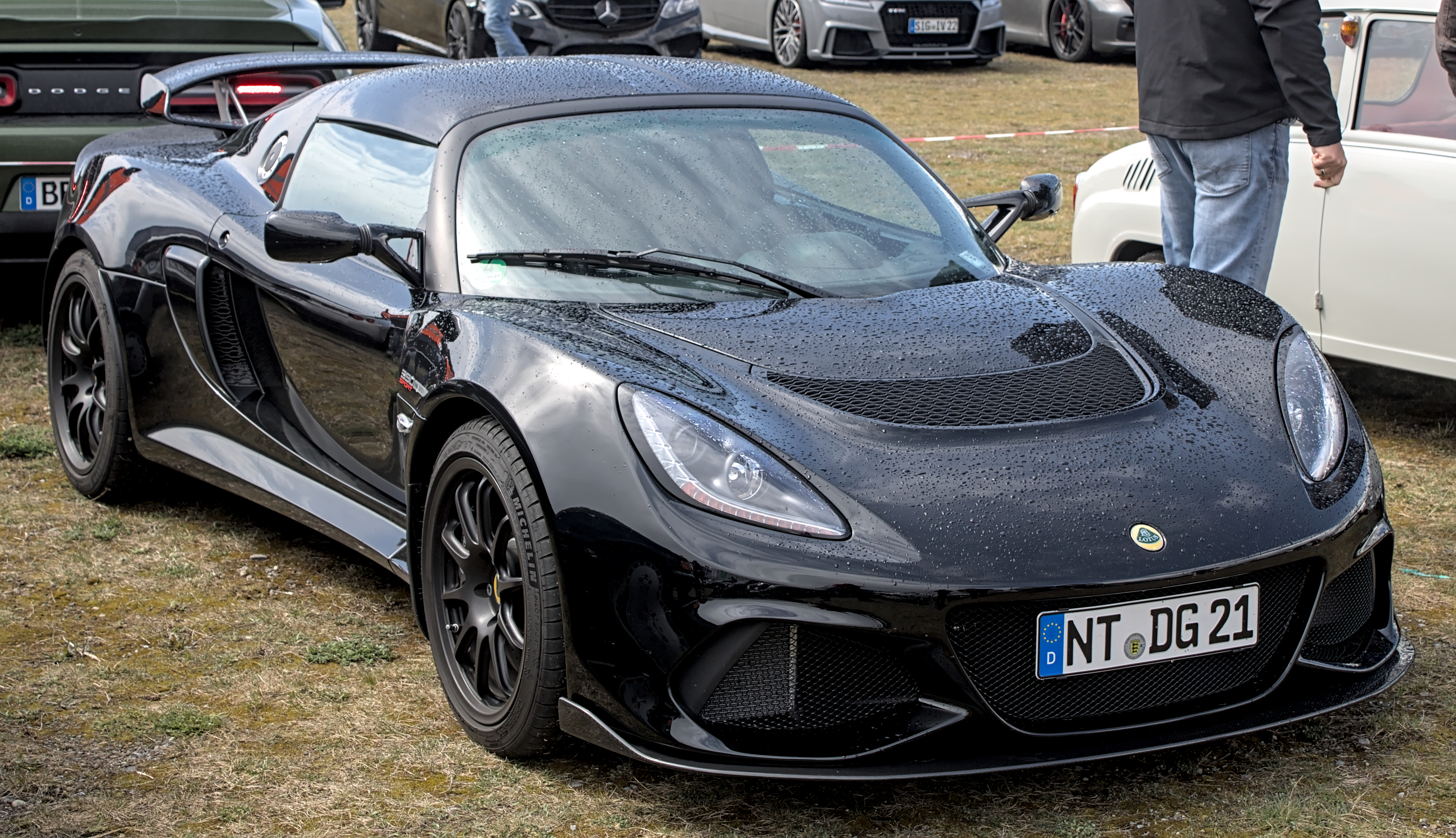
Lotus Exige Sport 390 Final Edition

On 9 February 2021, Lotus unveiled three final editions line-up models of Exige on online platforms.

Opening the line-up is the Exige Sport 390 Final Edition. Powering the model is a 3.5-litre supercharged V6 petrol engine shared with the wider Exige range, tuned to develop 397 bhp (403 PS; 296 kW) and 420 N⋅m (310 lb⋅ft). Lotus claims a 0–100 km/h acceleration time of 3.8 seconds and a top speed of 276 km/h. The 'entry-level' Exige tips the scales in at 1138 kg – making it the heaviest (just) of the three model variants. This aerodynamic package – comprising a splitter, diffuser, and spoiler– produces 70 kg of downforce at the rear and 45 kg up front, for a total of 115 kg at top speed. Two 17-inch front and two 18-inch rear 10-spoke forged alloy wheels hide in the wheel wells, wrapped in 205/45 front and 265/35 rear Michelin Pilot Sport 4 tyres.

Sitting above the Sport 390 is the Exige Sport 420 Final Edition. It is the fastest vehicle in the line-up in a straight line, producing 420 bhp (426 PS; 313 kW), and 427 N⋅m (315 lb⋅ft) from its 3.5-litre supercharged V6, allowing it to accelerate from 0–100 km/h (62 mph) in a claimed 3.4 seconds, and reach a top speed of 290 km/h (180 mph). Weighing 1,110 kg (2,447 lb), stopping power comes from AP Racing brakes, with forged four-piston callipers and two-piece J-Hook brake discs at all four corners. Adjustable Eibach anti-roll bars and three-way adjustable Nitron dampers are standard, as are 17-inch front and 18-inch lightweight forged alloy wheels wrapped in 215/45 front and 285/30 rear Michelin Pilot Sport Cup 2 rubber.

Sitting atop the range is the Exige Cup 430 Final Edition, which produces 430 bhp (436 PS; 321 kW) and 440 N⋅m (325 lb⋅ft) from its supercharged V6 engine, allowing for a claimed 0–100 km/h (62 mph) acceleration time of 3.3 seconds. This variant picks up carbon-fibre panels on the front splitter, front access panel, roof, diffuser surround, air-intake side pods, one-piece tailgate, and rear wing – good for 171 kg of downforce at its top speed of 280 km/h (174 mph). The lightweight parts drop the curb weight to 1,098 kg (2,421 lb). The Exige Sport 420's suspension, tyre and brake packages carry over to the top-spec car, though the Cup 430 gains diamond-cut 17-inch front and 18-inch rear alloy wheels, a high-flow titanium sports exhaust, and a multi-mode traction control system.

The Lotus Emira was launched on 6 July 2021 and went on sale in March 2022. It replaced the Evora, Exige and Elise.

== Racing ==
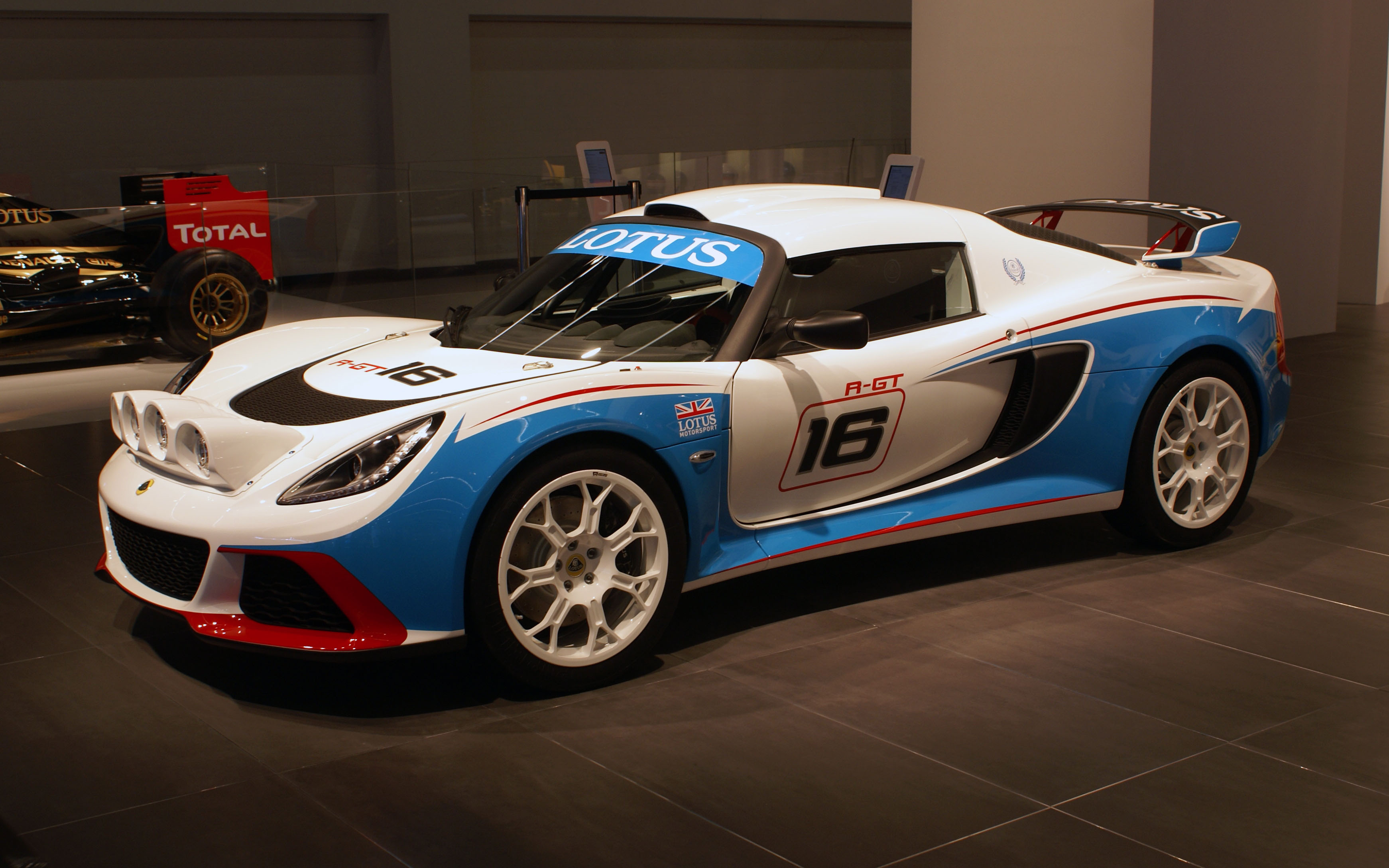
Lotus Exige R-GT

Several Exiges have been used in the SCCA Pro Racing World Challenge. An Exige GT3 and some CUP Exige have raced in the Supercar Challenge. An Exige participated in the GT300 class of the 2005 Super GT Series season.

Simply Sports Cars in Australia ran an Exige Cup R in endurance racing during 2014 and 2015 at the Bathurst 12 Hour, with class wins on both occasions.

== See also ==
- Hennessey Venom GT, an American supercar built on a modified Lotus Exige chassis
- List of rally cars
