= Samir Sadikhov =

Azerbaijani automotive designer (1990)

- Samir Sadıxov
- Born: July 20, 1990 (age 36); Ganja, Azerbaijan SSR, Soviet Union
- Education: Istituto Europe di Design - BA Transport Design Pforzheim University - MA Transport Design
- Occupation: Automotive designer
- Notable work: Genesis GMR-001, Extreme-E race car, Rezvani Tank, Genesis X Convertible, Ferrari Xezri (concept),
- Website: www.samirsadikhov.com

Samir Sadikhov (Azerbaijani: Samir Sadıxov/Самир Садыхов, IPA: [sɑˈmiɾ sɑˈdɯxov]; born July 20, 1990) is the first Azerbaijani professional automotive designer.

== Biography ==
Sadikhov was born in Ganja, Azerbaijan SSR on July 20, 1990. He earned a bachelor's in vehicle design at Istituto Europeo di Design (European Design University) in Turin, Italy. Later on, he earned a master's degree at Pforzheim University in Pforzheim, Germany.

Sadikhov first gained notoriety for his Ferrari Xezri concept in 2011. His concept, inspired by the Khazri wind won second prize in the Ferrari World Design Contest.

He has worked with numerous companies, including Lamborghini, Rezvani Motors, Ford, Genesis

== Works ==
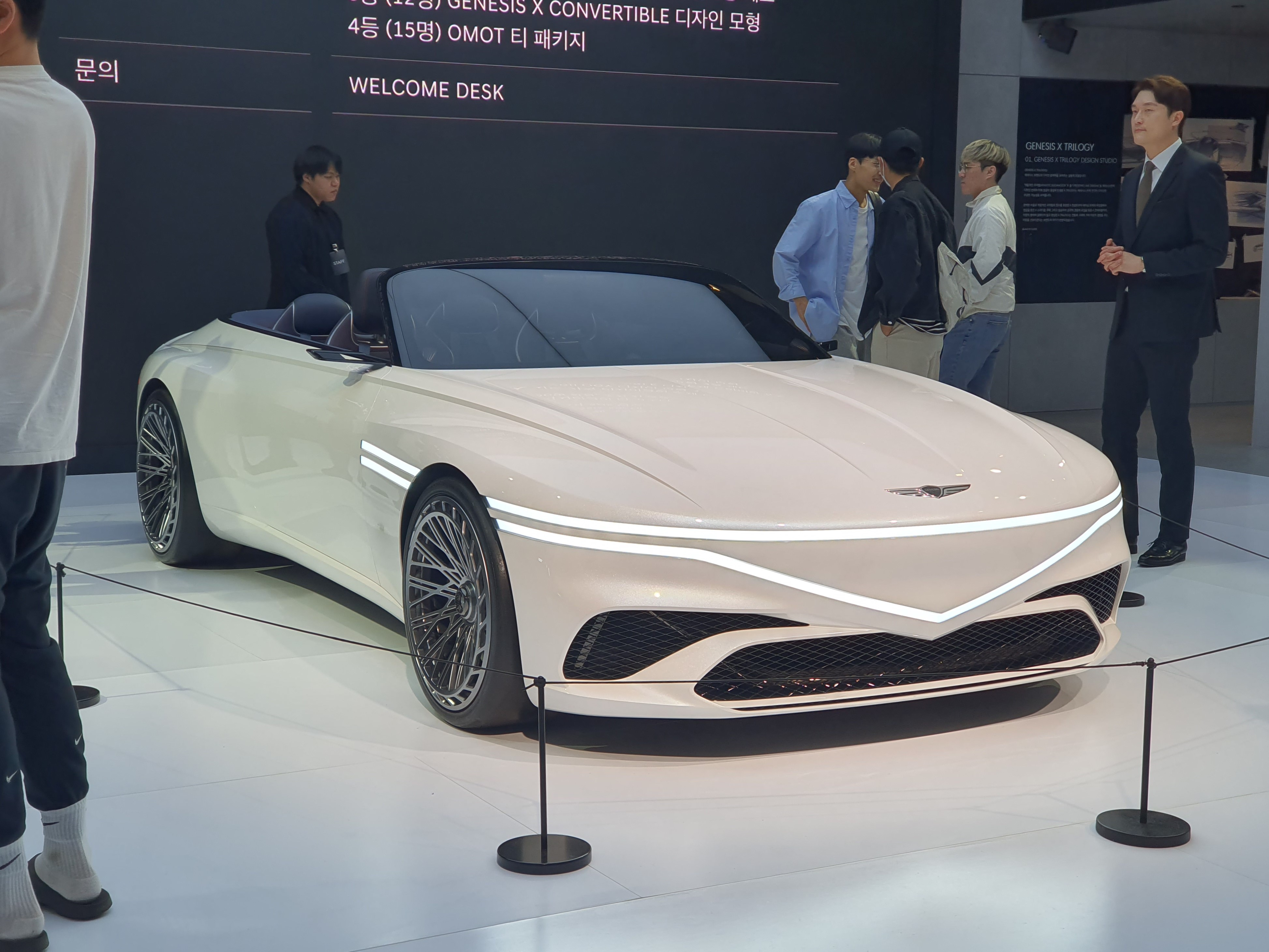
Genesis X Convertible

=== Personal car projects ===
- Cadillac C-Ville
- Cadillac XTSAlfa Romeo Giulia TZ
- Alfa Romeo TZ4
- Humvee
- Brubaker Box
- Ferrari F4T
- Alonso Indycar
- Ford Caspi
- Aston Martin DBS
- Quattro Beasts
- Incepto GT
- Jeep Vangler
- Land Rover Defender

=== Produced cars ===
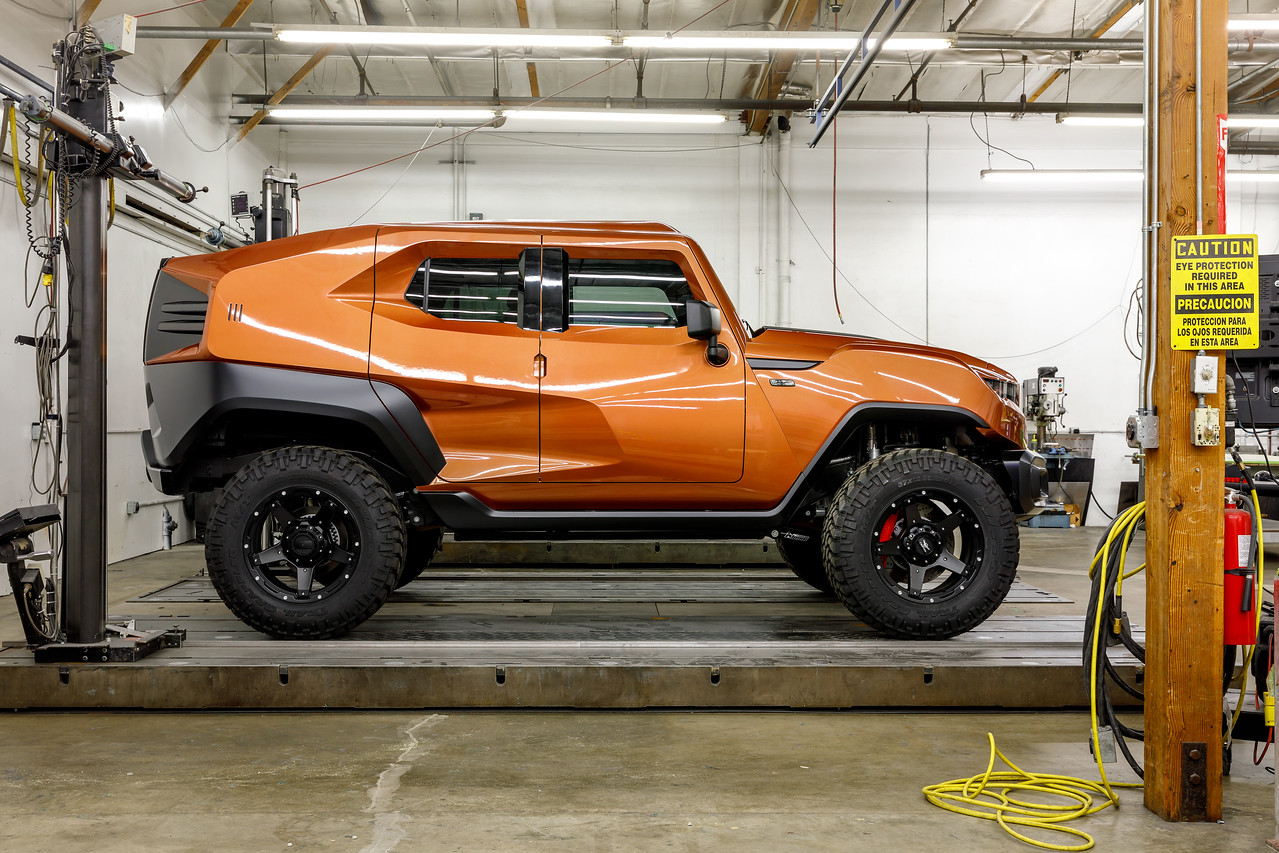
Rezvani Tank

- Rezvani Beast
- Rezvani Tank
- Lamborghini Aventador J (part of the team)
- Lamborghini Urus (part of the team)
- Genesis Essentia concept ( Exterior design team )
- Genesis Mint concept
- Genesis X Convertible

=== Race Cars ===
- Extreme-E - Odyssey (2017)
- Genesis GMR-001 - LMDH (2024)

=== Tyre ===
- Hankook Boostrac

== Awards ==
- IF Design Awards (2015)
- Red Dot Design Awards (2015)
- Automobile Magazine - The best concept car of the year (2018)
