= Genesis X Convertible =

Automobile

Genesis X Convertible (Korean: 제네시스 엑스 컨버터블) is the third model in Genesis' X Concept series.

== Design ==
The car was designed by Samir Sadikhov.

It premiered on November 16, 2022, in Malibu, California, United States. The design features of the Genesis X Convertible are refined luxury and intense tension created by clean lines and exquisite curves placed in the right places.

The front part features two-lines headlamps that reinterpret the crest grille, while the sides feature a long bonnet, a short front overhang, a dash-to-axle and a long wheelbase. At the rear, two-lines quad-lamp brake lights and V-shaped brake lights located at the top of the trunk contrast with the oval-shaped trunk. The wheels are an aero dish type with a G-matrix pattern, and the interior has a cockpit in which the control system and display wrap around the driver.

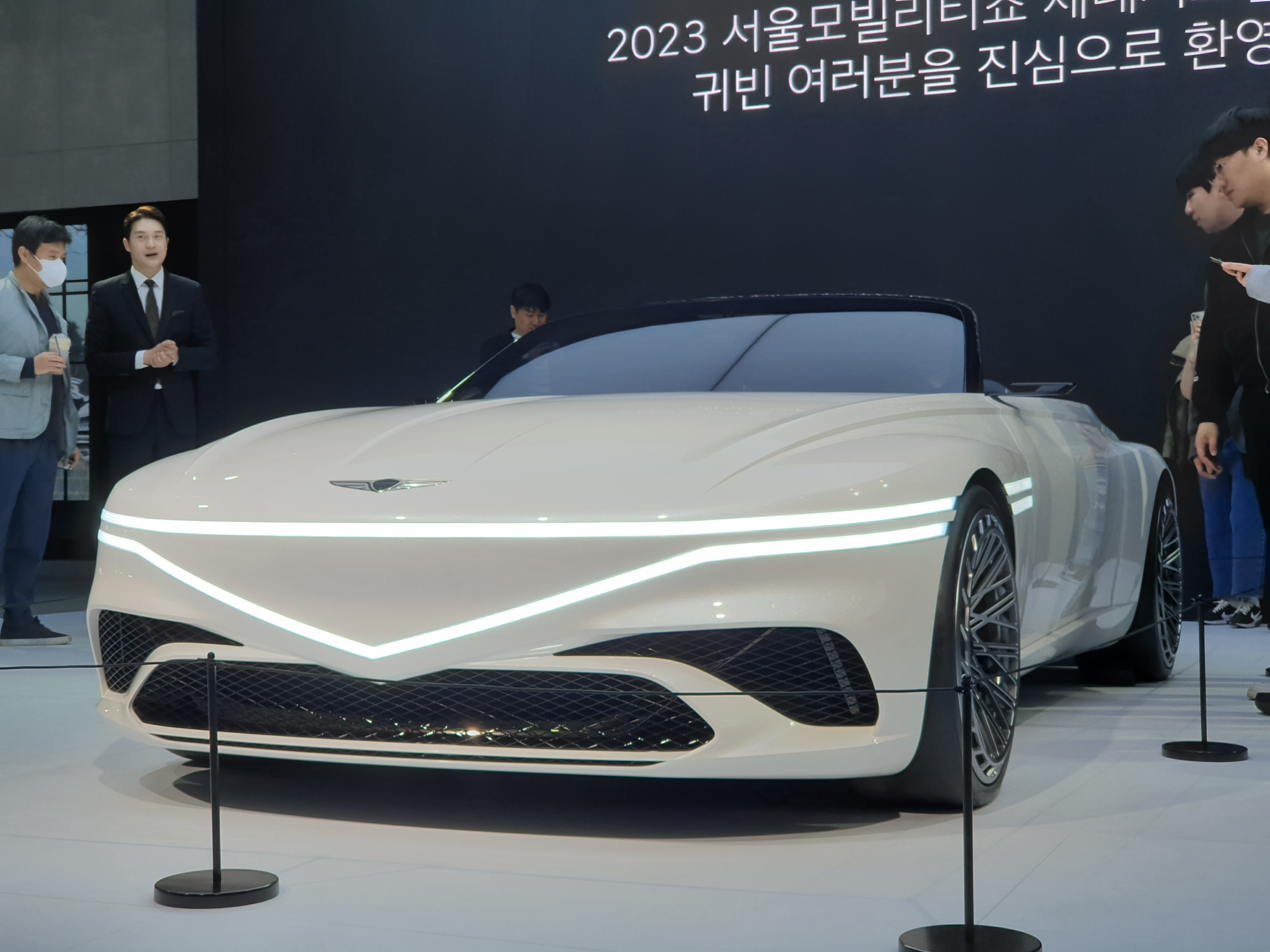
Front View

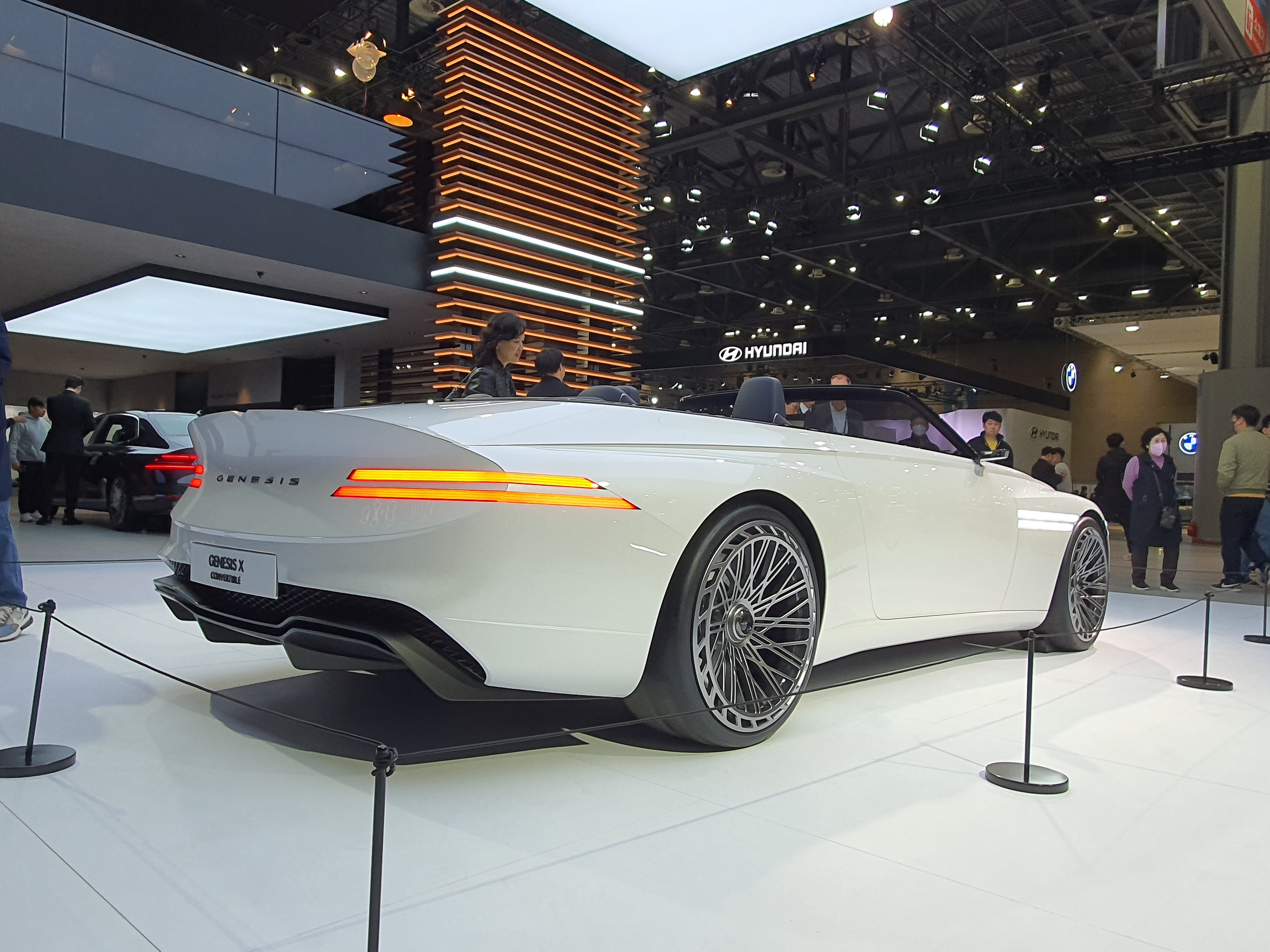
Rear View

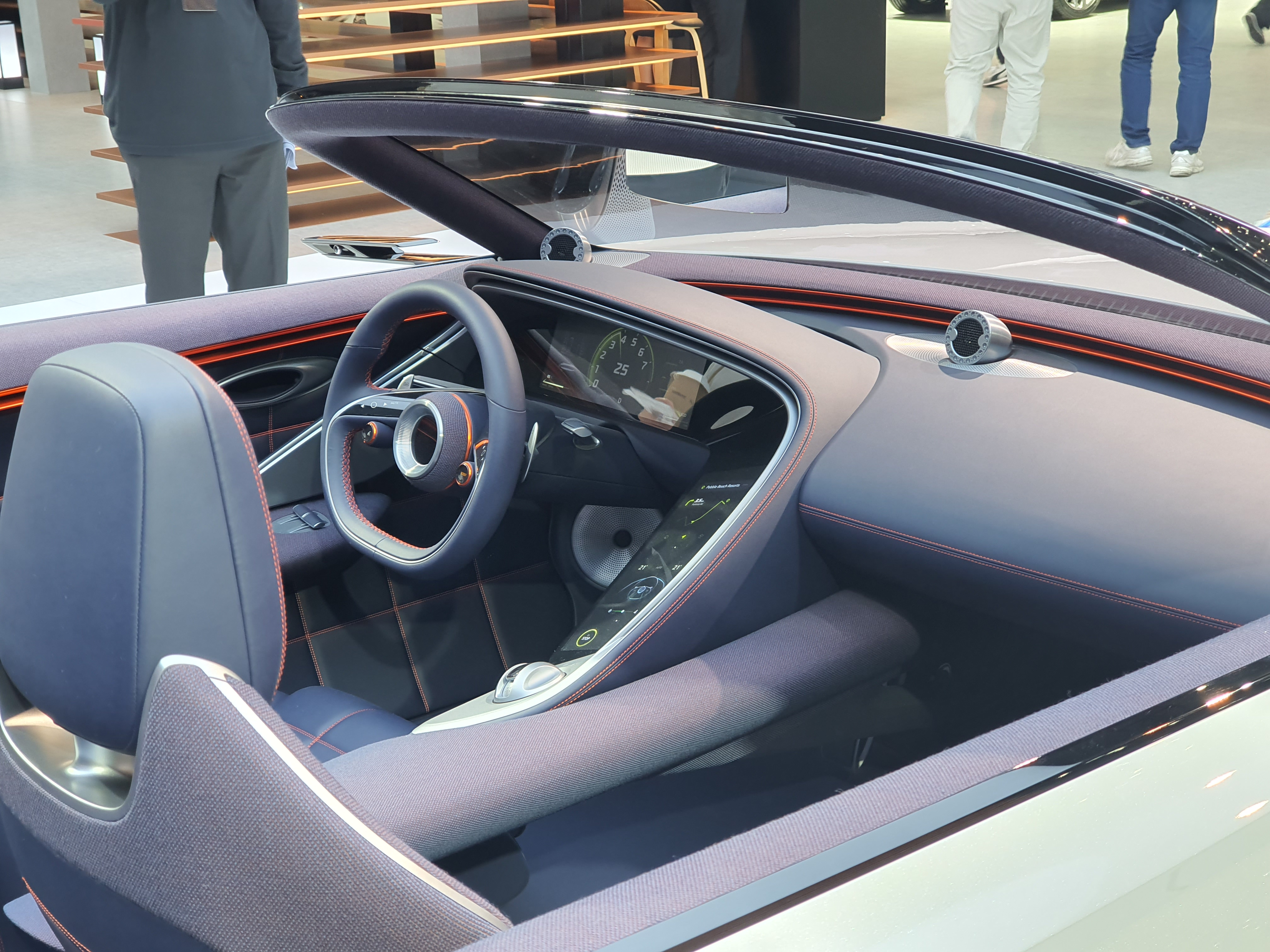
Interior
