= Rezvani Tank =

Mid-size sport utility vehicle

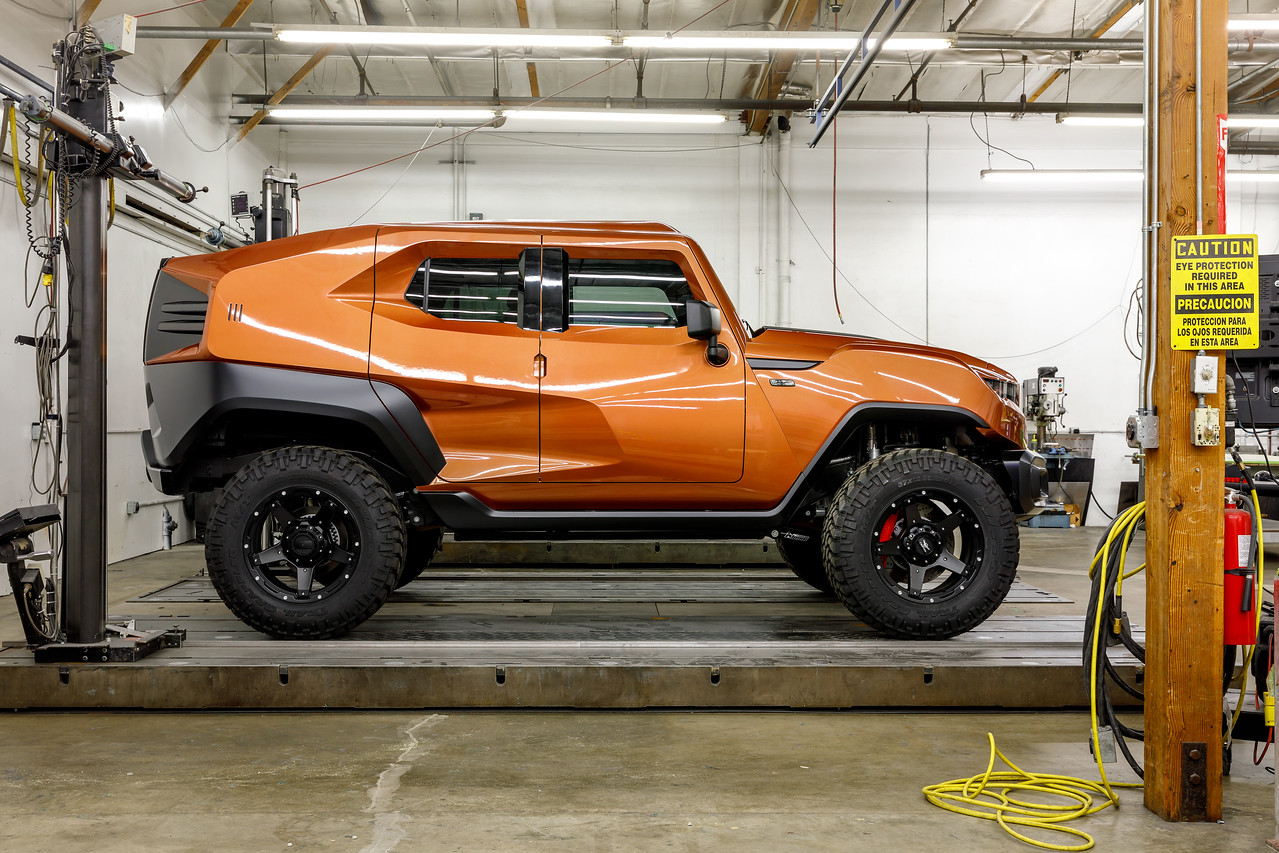
- First-generation Rezvani Tank

Overview
- Manufacturer: Rezvani Motors
- Production: 2017–present
- Designer: Samir Sadikhov

Body and chassis
- Class: Mid-size SUV
- Body style: 5-door SUV
- Layout: Front-engine, four-wheel-drive (first generation, second generation); Front-engine, rear-wheel-drive (second generation)
- Platform: Wrangler (first generation); JL (second generation)

The Rezvani Tank is a mid-size SUV produced by Rezvani Motors since 2017. It is designed to be a rugged-style SUV for civilian on-road use. The car was designed by Samir Sadikhov.

== First generation ==
Rezvani unveiled the first-generation Tank in November 2017. Around this time, Rezvani decided to cooperate with Jeep, which resulted in the Tank being developed on the Wrangler's platform.

The first generation of the vehicle features clearly defined wheel arches and aggressively styled body details. The rear part of the body is decorated with a hump with high-position LED rear lamps. The Tank was powered by a 6.4 L 500 hp V8 engine, which worked with a manually controlled AWD drive and an automatic transmission.

== Second generation ==
Rezvani unveiled the second-generation Tank in 2019. Two years after the premiere of the first-generation Tank, whose debut was quickly followed by the debut of a completely new generation Wrangler, Rezvani decided to build a new, second generation of the Tank, which was based on the JL model.

Compared to its predecessor, the second-generation Tank gained a more voluminous body with a more pronounced silhouette, which was longer and had traditionally opening rear doors. The exterior details and the appearance of individual parts were completely redesigned. The standard equipment was also extensively revised.

Like its predecessor, the second-generation Tank was distinguished by high-performance driving characteristics thanks to a sporty power unit. This time, the 6.2 L V8 Hemi engine from the Dodge Challenger has been revised to reach 1000 hp instead of the standard 840 hp. An alternative V6 engine with 285 hp is also offered.
