= Rezvani Beast =

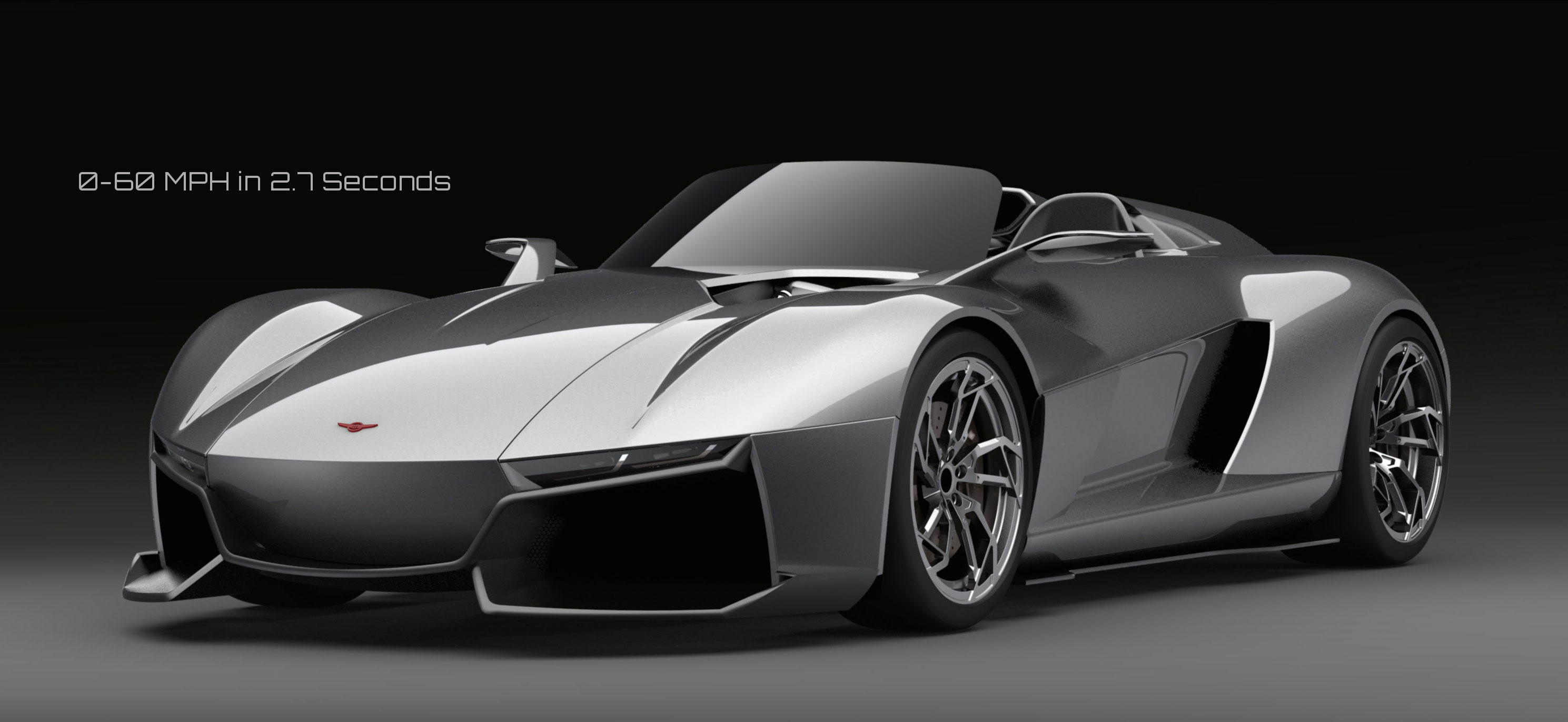

Overview
- Manufacturer: Rezvani Motors
- Production: 2015–present 1 unit per 1-3 months
- Assembly: Santa Ana, California
- Designer: Samir Sadikhov

Body and chassis
- Class: Sports car (S)
- Body style: 0-door speedster 2-door targa 2-door coupé
- Layout: Transverse mid-engine, rear-wheel-drive Rear mid-engine, four-wheel-drive (Beast (2024))
- Platform: Ariel Atom; Lotus Elise
- Doors: Sidewinder (Beast Alpha, X, X Blackbird); Scissor (Beast (2024))

Powertrain
- Engine: 2.4 L Honda racing K24 / Cosworth I-VTEC Rotrex™ supercharged I4; 2.4 L K24 / Cosworth turbocharged I4; 2.5 L Cosworth turbocharged I4; 6.2 L LT7 twin-turbo flat-plane DOHC V8
- Electric motor: 1x Permanent magnet synchronous motor
- Transmission: 6-speed Type R manual 6-speed sequential Tremec TR-9080 DCT 8-speed dual clutch transmission
- Hybrid drivetrain: Through the Road Hybrid (Beast (2024))
- Battery: 1.9 kWh 300 V (Beast (2024))

Dimensions
- Wheelbase: 2,345 mm (92.3 in)
- Length: 4,145 mm (163.2 in)
- Width: 1,981 mm (78.0 in)
- Curb weight: 750 kg (1,650 lb); 755 kg (1,664 lb)

The Rezvani Beast is a two-door sports car manufactured by Rezvani Motors. The car is based on the Ariel Atom and the Lotus Elise (for the Beast Alpha X Blackbird) sports cars. The car was announced in June 2014.

== Models ==
=== Beast ===
The Rezvani Beast is the base model of the lineup. Because the car is a convertible, it has been dubbed the "Rezvani Beast Speedster". The Beast was designed by Azerbaijani designer Samir Sadikhov.

The Beast contains a 2.4 liter supercharged I4 with a dual overhead camshaft and intercooler, producing 300 hp (224 kW; 304 PS). This power is delivered to the rear wheels by a 6-speed manual transmission, the only transmission available for the model. This car contains a chromoly tubular chassis and a dual-layer carbon fiber body without doors. The underpinnings are from an Ariel Atom. The wheels are made entirely from forged aluminum.

A 500 hp (373 kW; 507 PS) version of the Beast came out later. The car is the same as the older Beast, with a 0–60 mph (0–97 km/h) of 2.9 seconds, but the only difference is that the car is more powerful. The weight is 750 kg (1,653 lb), setting the car's power-to-weight ratio to 666.6 hp (497.1 kW; 675.8 PS) per ton.

The design for the base model Beast was built in a year. The Beast also has the original Ariel Atom brake calipers and discs installed, and has a custom horn. Because the car is a convertible, it had to have waterproof leather installed.

In 2024, Rezvani completely overhauled their platform to the C8 Corvette, featuring a mid mounted 1,000 HP twin-turbo 6.2L V8 capable of going from 0-60 MPH in 2.5 seconds and 1/4 mile in 9.6 seconds.

=== Beast Alpha ===
The Beast Alpha is a coupe version of the Beast. The car debuted at a Rezvani keynote in 2016. Even though the Alpha is not a base model, it is cheaper than its speedster counterpart at US$95,000 due to price drops after its debut. It was originally US$200,000. This price drop began in 2018.

The car includes what Rezvani calls "Sidewinder" doors, doors that pop to the side and slide forward. This is the only Beast to have these doors. This is not standard, but comes as a US$10,000 option.

The car has a new 2.4-liter turbocharged I4 tuned by Cosworth, which produces 500 hp (373 kW; 507 PS). The car's 0–60 mph (0–97 km/h) acceleration time is slower than the regular Beast, at 3.5 seconds. The Alpha's top speed is 175 mph (282 km/h). The car's power is sent to the rear wheels by a 6-speed manual. Instead of the chromoly chassis, the chassis is aluminum. The car's weight is slightly heavier at 755 kg (1,664 lb), which makes the car's power-to-weight ratio lower, at 662.3 hp (493.9 kW; 671.5 PS) per ton. This is due to the addition of new features.

The name Alpha slightly resembles this lower specification rating because of its usage in early models before their final product.

The car's options are very costly. For example, a 6-speed semi-automatic with paddle shifters is available for US$15,000, and the "Sidewinder" doors are averaged at US$10,000.

=== Beast X ===
The Beast X is the most powerful variant of the Beast, and is available as both the Beast X and the Beast Alpha X. These models are priced at US$325,000 and US$229,000 respectively.

Only five of these cars were produced. The Beast X contains the 2.5 liters Cosworth I4 but is turbocharged, this time by a pair of Borg Warners. This pushes out 700 hp (522 kW; 710 PS). Combined with a curb weight of 750 kg (1,653 lb), the car has a power-to-weight ratio of 933.3 hp (696.0 kW; 946.2 PS) per ton. The car's design has been slightly changed for aerodynamic purposes. There are new added aero gaps and fender grilles, and also a new split spoiler that loosely resembles the Pagani Zonda C12. The front and rear have been revised to add extra downforce, along with the gaps, grilles, and spoiler. This power is sent to the rear wheels by a 6-speed manual transmission, with a semi-automatic as an option for the X. The car has a 0–60 mph (0–97 km/h) time of 2.5 seconds.

==== Beast Alpha X ====
The coupe version of X has the same 2.5-liter turbocharged Cosworth I4, but only produces 525 hp (391 kW; 532 PS). No aerodynamic pieces are added, and it features a similar design to the Beast Alpha. The weight is the same as the Beast and Beast X, at 750 kg (1,653 lb). Power-to-weight ratio is at 700 hp (520 kW; 710 PS) per ton. The power is delivered by a 6-speed manual transmission. The body is made of carbon fiber.

==== Beast Alpha X Blackbird ====
The most extreme version of the Beast Alpha dubbed the Beast Alpha X Blackbird was launched in 2018. The car features a body made from carbon fibre, sidewinder doors, a signature element of Beast Alpha and a 2.5-litre turbocharged Inline-4 engine developed in collaboration with Cosworth producing 700 hp (710 PS; 522 kW). Power is transferred to the rear wheels through a 6-speed manual transmission while sequential manual transmission is available as an option. Weight has also been reduced to 2,150 lb (975 kg). Due to the upgrades, the car is capable of accelerating from 0–60 mph (0–97 km/h) in 2.9 seconds. Comfort of the occupants is also kept in consideration and features such as power windows, air conditioning, central locking system and infotainment system is included as standard. The car is available at a base price of US$325,000.

=== Beast (2024) ===
In 2024, Rezvani announced a new generation of the Beast based on the Corvette C8 platform, with a twin-turbo 6.2-liter V8 producing 1,000 hp (750 kW; 1,000 PS) and a starting MSRP of US$449,000. Rezvani claims the car reaches 0–60 mph (0–97 km/h) in 2.5 seconds and does the 1/4-mile in 9.6 seconds. The starting weight is 2,960 lb (1,343 kg), but that increases with the optional US$55,000 armor package that adds bullet-proof glass and body armor.

== Reception ==
Jay Leno featured a review about the Rezvani Beast on his YouTube channel. Overall, the car received positive reception from him.

Jeff Glucker from the channel The Hooniverse reviewed the Rezvani Beast. He mentioned the car used a very well-made platform (the Ariel Atom), a good engine, good suspension, and nice looks. Forward visibility was well done, but the side mirrors weren't too practical. The car was already difficult to drive, but Glucker mentioned that Rezvani had slightly altered the wheelbase to give better stability. The removable steering made for a much better entrance and exit on the car. The transmission shifter was also well done, the clutch felt quick, and the pedals were good. Glucker also mentioned that the car felt very raw because of the absence of power steering.

Matt Farah reviewed a Beast, and drove it down the Ortega Highway of California State Route 74. He mentioned that the car`s steering is very tight, making it feel like a Le Mans Prototype or a Formula One car, which made it difficult to manage around roads. He also mentioned that the gas pedal was heavy to push, and that steering without power assist and having large tires made steering harder. He then stated that braking wasn't too stable, the car felt like an actual race car and not a road car that fulfills the race car feel, and that the turning radius was a bit bad. The car was also too sensitive in Farah's view. Because of these downsides when driving, he stated that professional drivers are able to take the struggles, but amateurs may not be able to cope. It also made him frightened to push further. He did mention, on the positive side, that the styling was beautiful, it was quick, and the supercharger made the car sound good. Overall, Farah said that the car was not worth US$159,000, but he was happy it exists because of how unique it is.
