= Rezvani Motors =

American car company

- Industry: Automotive
- Founded: Irvine, California; 2013; 13 years ago
- Founder: Ferris Rezvani
- Headquarters: Irvine, California
- Number of locations: 1 dealership
- Area served: Irvine, California
- Key people: Ferris Rezvani, CEO; Samir Sadikhov, Head of Design
- Number of employees: 2-10
- Website: www.rezvanimotors.com

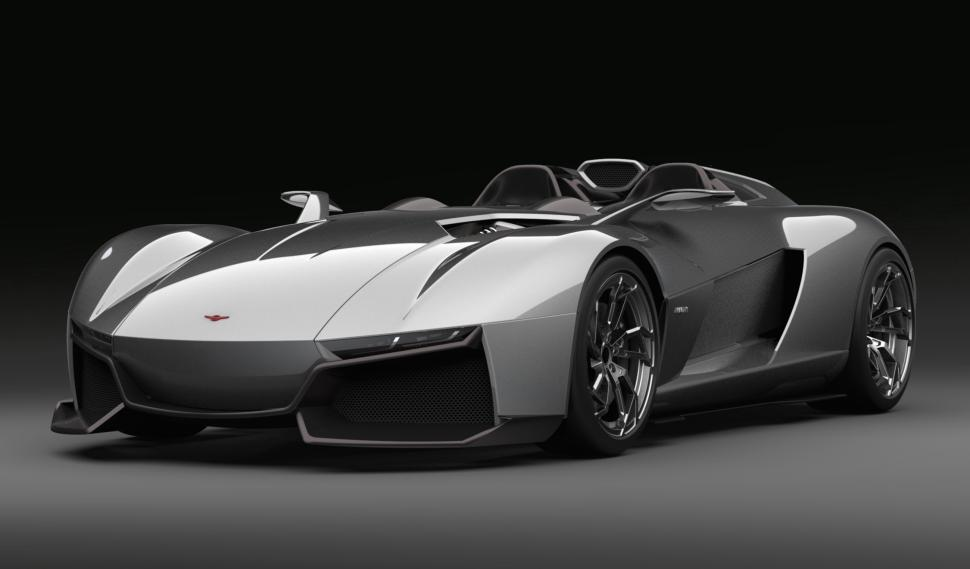
The Rezvani Beast

Rezvani Motors is an American automotive designer and manufacturer of high-performance sports cars based in Irvine, California. Rezvani Motors was founded by Iranian-American Ferris Rezvani, one of the designers of the Vencer Sarthe.

The company's main product is the Rezvani Beast.

== History ==
Rezvani Motors was founded in 2013 by Ferris Rezvani. Rezvani Motors' vehicle production is done in a 50,000-square-foot facility in Santa Ana, California. In May 2015, Rezvani Motors released details and photos of the Rezvani Beast. In June 2015, Rezvani unveiled the production version of the Beast allowing customers to order the car with an 8–12 week production process.

Chris Brown purchased the first Rezvani Beast in 2015 for $200,000. The car was used in the filming of Brown's single "Zero." Enrique Iglesias drove the Rezvani Beast Alpha in his music video "El Baño".

Rezvani unveiled its extreme utility vehicle named Tank in November 2017. Tank is designed to be a military-style truck for the road. Some features it offers are optional ballistic armor, glass and all opaque armor, firewall, bomb protection, reinforced suspension, Military Runflat Tires and Intercom System. It is powered by a 6.4L V8 Dodge Hemi engine and on-demand 4-wheel drive. The Rezvani Tank has more options such as a thermal night vision system, bulletproof glass, composite armor around the passengers, a rear tack dispenser, electrified door handles, magnetic deadbolts, blinding lights, gas masks, hypothermia kit, hidden radiator, and kevlar wrapped fuel tank. The Tank is built in the US in Rezvani's Irvine, California plant. It has an off-road suspension system designed by FOX racing suspensions.

Owners of Tanks include Jamie Foxx, Rampage Jackson, and Chris Brown.

== Products ==
=== Beast ===
In June 2014, Rezvani Motors introduced the Rezvani Beast, based on the Ariel Atom, using the Ariel Atom chassis with a lightweight carbon fiber body. It is American-made using several British built Ariel Atom parts. The car has a six-speed manual transmission with a rear-wheel layout. The windshield is removable and the car weighs approximately 1,650 pounds. The production uses custom fit 3D printing and CNC milling technology for an estimated 1,500 labor hours of work. CNC routing is used to make a 3D version of the car. The 3D print is used as a mold for the carbon fiber panels. 3D printers create other parts of the vehicle such as lights and mirrors.

=== Beast X ===
To top the Beast, Rezvani Motors introduced their next sports car: the Beast X. Still street-legal, the Beast X weighs in at 1,850 lbs, with 700 horsepower. The car uses a 2.4-liter motor with Borg Warner turbochargers, which helps it hit 60 mph in 2.5 seconds. Only 5 Beast Xs will be produced, with an anticipated price tag of $325,000.

=== Beast Alpha ===
In November 2016, Rezvani unveiled the Beast Alpha as an upcoming version. The Alpha will include Rezvani's newly patented "Sidewinder doors", a hardtop, power windows, power locks, airbags and climate control.

=== Beast Alpha X ===
In February 2018, Rezvani unveiled the Beast Alpha X "Blackbird". Inspired by the Lockheed SR-71 Blackbird, it is their most performance-oriented car, with a reduced body weight of 2,150 lbs., a 700-horsepower 2.5 liter turbocharged engine and a 0-60 mph time of 2.9 seconds.

=== Tank ===
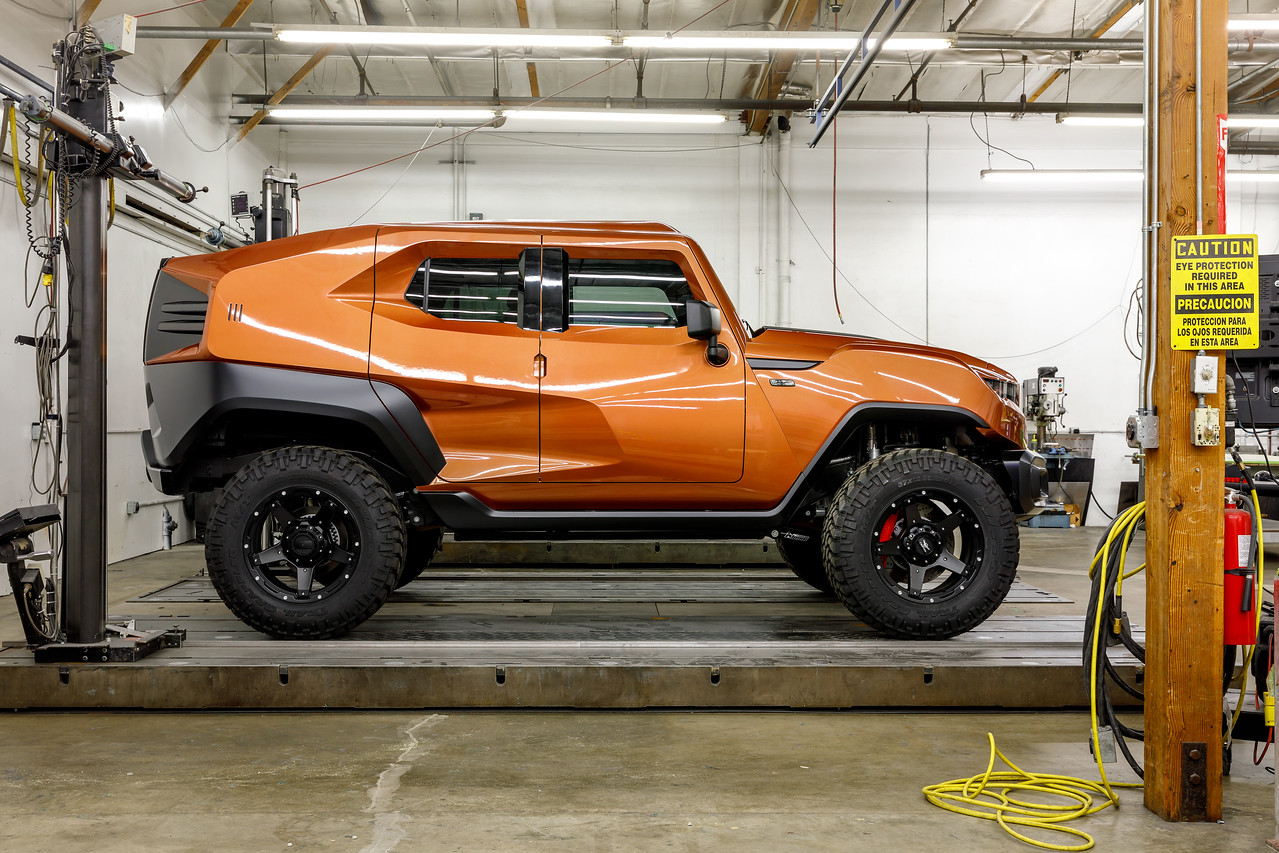
Rezvani Tank

Rezvani unveiled its utility vehicle named Tank in November 2017.

The 2020 Rezvani Tank is a military inspired Extreme Utility Vehicle (XUV). It's offered with a 6.4L SRT HEMI V8 producing 500 HP, or a 1,000 horsepower 6.2L supercharged V8 found in the Dodge Demon. The Tank uses upgrade FOX suspension. The Tank has been in films such as Men in Black: International.

The Rezvani Tank Military Edition comes with standard bulletproof ballistics armor protection in the glass and body. Standard equipment includes bulletproof glass and body armor, underside explosive protection, smoke screen, run-flat tires and thermal night vision system.

=== Rezvani Hercules ===
The Rezvani Hercules is a 6x6 pick-up truck built on the Jeep Gladiator body chassis and was unveiled on online platforms on November 10, 2020. Engine options include a 3.6L V6, 3.0L turbodiesel, 6.4L V8, supercharged 6.2L V8 or a 7.0L custom-built supercharged V8 that produces up to 1,300 hp.

=== Rezvani Vengeance ===
The Rezvani Vengeance is a full-size off-road SUV produced by Rezvani since 2022. It has off-road capabilities and comes with a Military Package trim that comes with body armor and bullet-resistant windows. Drivetrain options include a 420-horsepower 6.2L V8 gas, 277 horsepower 3.0 I6 Diesel, 590 horsepower supercharged 6.2L V8, and a 810-horsepower supercharged 6.2 L V8.

=== Rezvani RR1 ===
Rezvani RR1 is a retro-build Porsche racecar.
