= Lotus Emira =

British sports car

- 2025 Lotus Emira

Overview
- Manufacturer: Lotus Cars
- Also called: Lotus NYO Emira (China, 2022–2025)
- Production: 2022–present
- Assembly: United Kingdom: Hethel, Norfolk
- Designer: Daniel Durrant under Russell Carr (exterior); Jon Statham (interior)

Body and chassis
- Class: Sports car (S)
- Body style: 2-door coupé
- Layout: Transverse mid-engine, rear-wheel drive
- Platform: Elemental

Powertrain
- Engine: 2.0 L AMG M139 turbo I4; 3.5 L Toyota 2GR-FE supercharged V6
- Transmission: 6-speed Aisin AI manual (3.5 L); 6-speed Aisin AI IPS automatic (3.5 L); 8-speed AMG Speedshift 8G DCT (2.0 L)

Dimensions
- Wheelbase: 2,573 mm (101.3 in)
- Length: 4,412 mm (173.7 in)
- Width: 1,895 mm (74.6 in)
- Height: 1,224 mm (48.2 in)
- Kerb weight: 1,487 kg (3,279 lb)

Chronology
- Predecessor: Lotus Elise; Lotus Exige; Lotus Evora

The Lotus Emira (codenamed "Type 131") is a sports car manufactured by the British company Lotus Cars. It was originally intended to be the firm's final vehicle powered by an internal combustion engine, however this plan has been canceled, and Lotus is now intending to manufacture plug-in hybrids.

== History ==
The Emira was launched at Hethel, England on 6 July 2021 and then presented at the Goodwood Festival of Speed on 8 July 2021. It replaces the Evora, Exige and Elise. The Emira's design bears several similarities to that of the Evija, which was presented in 2019.

The Emira initially went on sale in March 2022 and came with a 3.5 litre supercharged V6 sourced by Toyota, with a power output of 406 PS (299 kW; 400 hp). A smaller 2.0 litre turbocharged engine sourced from Mercedes-AMG was later offered as an option, with this engine having a power output of 365 PS (268 kW; 360 hp). The V6 First Edition was expected to have been available by Spring 2022, with the i4 following in Autumn 2022.

In 2022, the Emira made its debut in Malaysia with the First Edition being the variant on offer. It was powered by the 3.5 litre supercharged V6.

Global post-pandemic supply chain issues meant that the factory was unable to achieve full production capacity during 2022. The first EU and UK V6 manual variants (including some UK dealer demonstrator V6 cars) were delivered to customers in Q4 2022. Plans for 2023 included the first V6 automatic deliveries for the EU and UK in Q1, and US V6 deliveries starting in Q4. i4 variant production for the UK started in Q3.

After 2030, the Emira will receive a new engine—the Horse W30, a 3-liter twin-turbocharged 90-degree V6 engine mated to an electric motor sending power through an automatic transmission. This drivetrain will become the only option, replacing the current AMG four-cylinder and Toyota V6 units as well as the manual transmission.

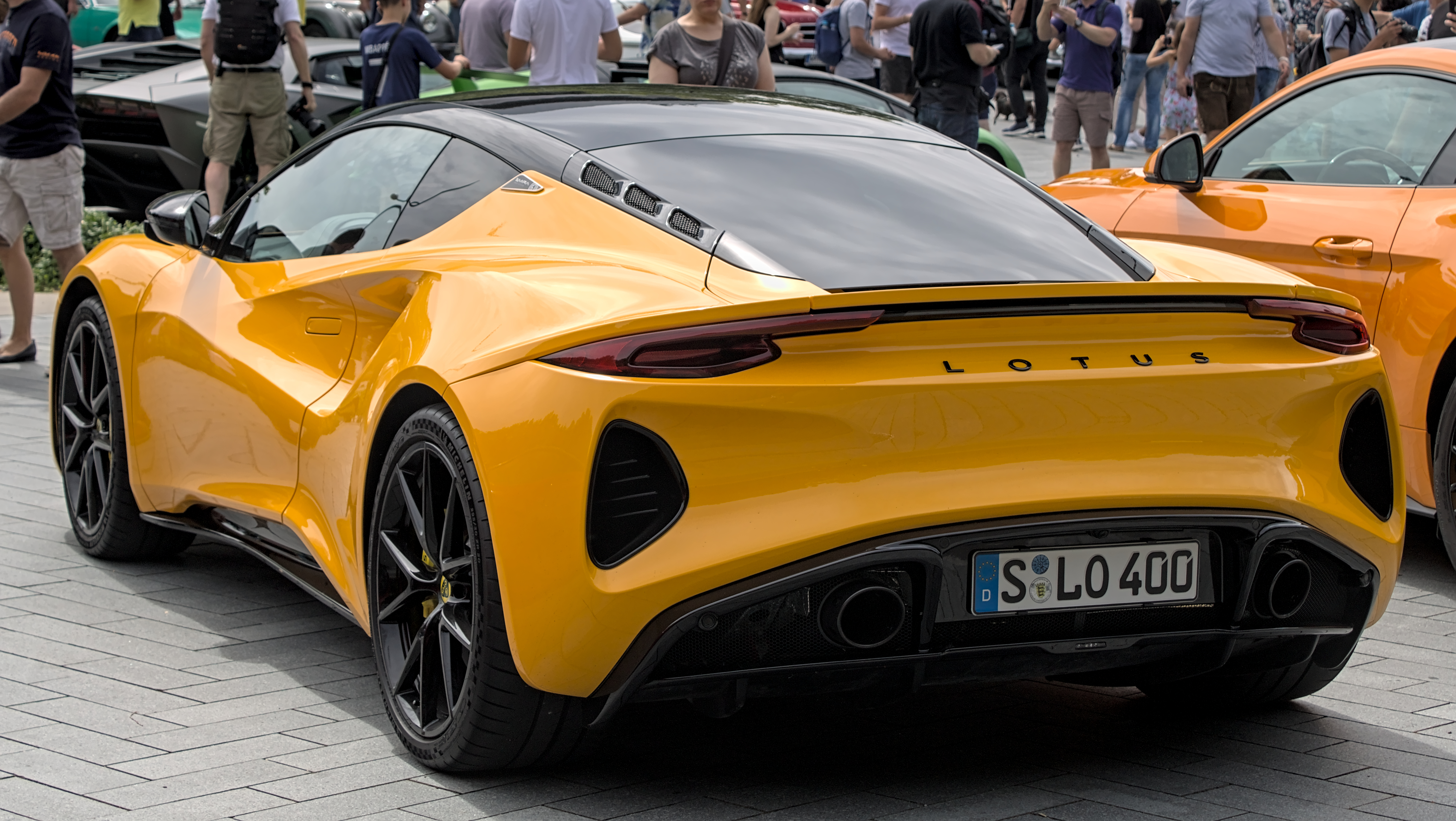
Lotus Emira rear view

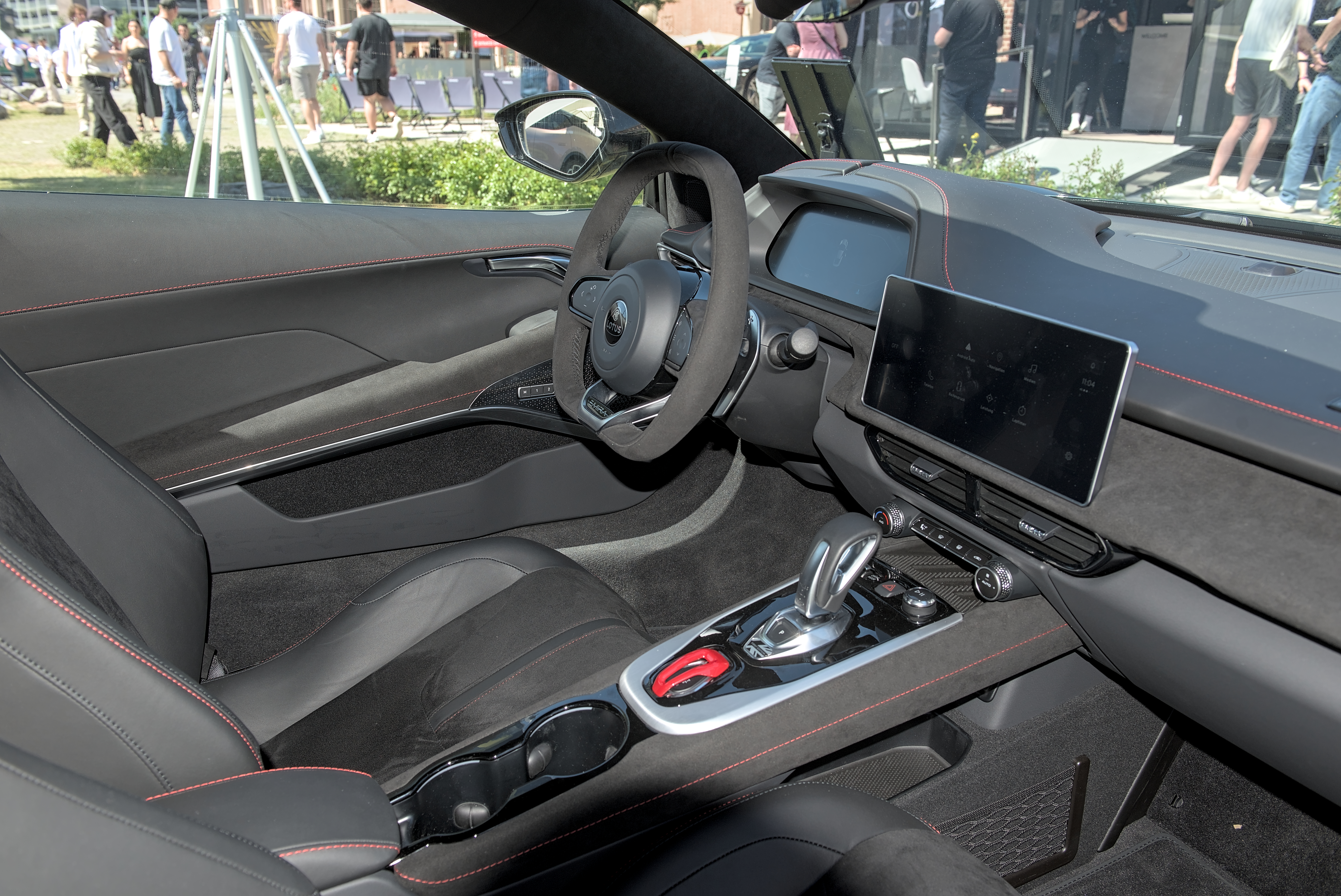
Interior

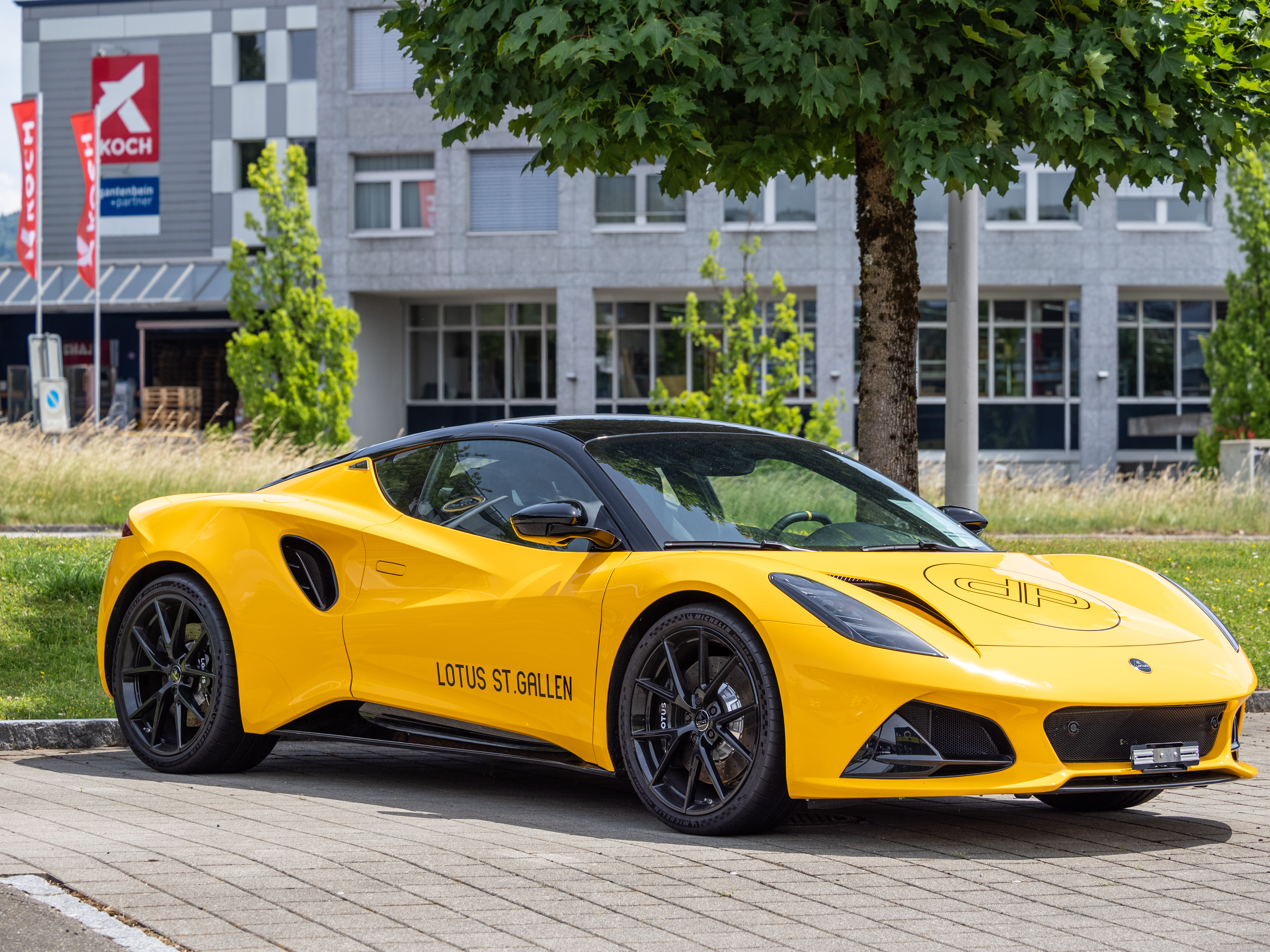
Lotus Emira 2.0 i4 SE

Lotus Emira SE Scura

== GT4 ==
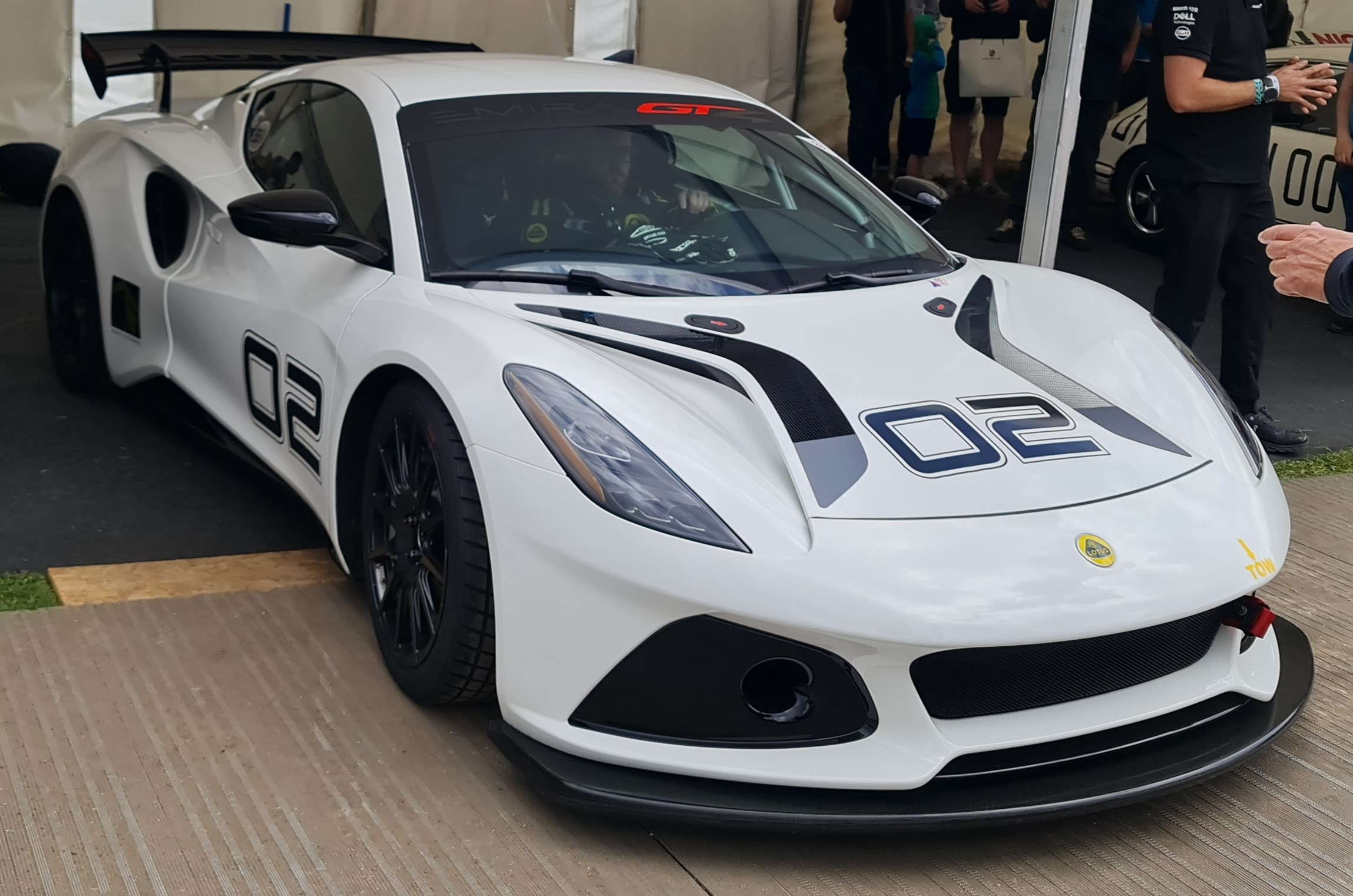
Lotus Emira GT4

In 2022, Lotus revealed that they would be making the Emira GT4, for GT4 competition. Following a few updates, the car was first released to customers in autumn 2023. The car made its racing debut in the 2023 GT Cup Championship, followed by its global racing debut at the Great Bay GT Cup in November 2023, where it scored a 1-2 finish.

== Sales ==
Year	China
2023	577
2024	499
2025	199
