= Phil Popham =

British businessman

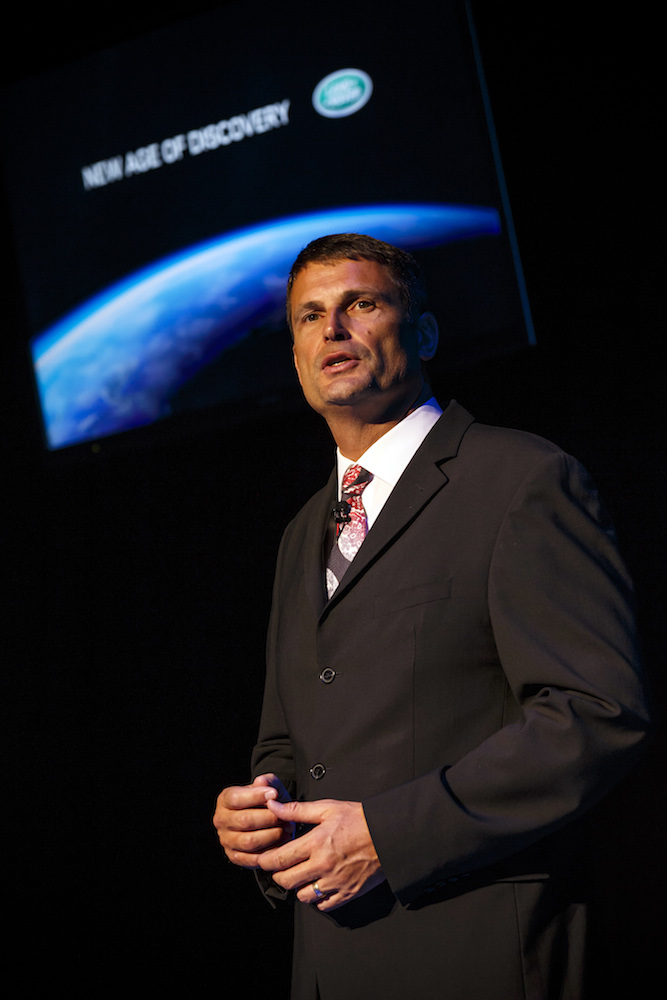
- Born: 1965 (age 60–61)
- Education: University of Aston
- Occupation: Business Man

Phil Popham is a British Business man who has mainly been employed in the automotive industry. He had a long career at Jaguar Land Rover, and latterly was the chief executive officer of Lotus Cars. He has also been CEO of Sunseeker during his career.

== Background ==
He was born in 1965 in Redditch, Worcestershire, England, and graduated with a BSc (Hons) in management studies from the University of Aston, Birmingham.

== Career ==
=== Jaguar Land Rover ===
Having joined Land Rover as a graduate trainee in 1988, Popham held a number of senior positions in the company including Director of Land Rover European Operations, marketing director for Land Rover South Africa, and Vice President of Marketing for Land Rover North America.

He briefly joined Volkswagen Commercial Vehicles in the UK in 1999 before returning to Land Rover to become UK Sales Director in 2001. Two years of record sales followed and saw him promoted to become managing director of both Jaguar and Land Rover UK national sales companies in 2003.

In 2006, following the departure of Matthew Taylor, Popham was promoted to a board level role as Land Rover Global Managing Director where he was responsible for the sales and marketing operations of Land Rover globally. He held this role until 2010, when he became Global Sales and Service Operations Director, with responsibility for the global sales and after sales operations of both brands, overseeing the regional business units and worldwide dealer network. During his time as Jaguar Land Rover sales director, overall sales increased significantly fuelled by increased demand for the Land Rover product lines as sport utility vehicles gained popularity, and the business expanding into a number of global markets, most notably China.

In 2013, he moved to his final role at Jaguar Land Rover to become Group Marketing Director with responsibility for all global marketing activity for both brands, including product marketing, consumer insight, communications, and experiential.

=== Sunseeker ===
In 2014, Popham announced his intention to leave Jaguar Land Rover to become CEO of luxury boat manufacturer, Sunseeker. He joined Sunseeker in 2015, and sought to turnaround a business which had posted losses for 2014. By 2016, he had successfully developed and executed a turnaround plan which saw the business return to profitability, ahead of schedule following a number of challenging years. He announced his intention to leave Sunseeker in 2018 to pursue other opportunities and in comments by owners Dalian Wanda made at the time, credited with leaving the business in a very healthy position and record order book.

=== Lotus Cars ===
In October 2018, Popham returned to the automotive industry, and was appointed Senior Vice President Commercial Operations for Group Lotus, and CEO of Lotus Cars. At Lotus, he set about devising another turnaround strategy for a company owned by Chinese investors, with Geely having taken majority control of Lotus in 2017. He developed and implemented Lotus Cars’ Vision80 strategy which will see transformational change across the company including a complete transformation and unprecedented investment at Lotus’ headquarters in Hethel, Norfolk including wholesale upgrades across the site, a new sports car factory and hypercar assembly. Product wise he spearheaded the launch of the Lotus Evija and announced the discontinuation of the Lotus Elise, Exige, and Evora to be replaced by a new Lotus, dubbed “Type 131”. Shortly after this announcement, Popham announced his intention to step down as CEO in March 2021 to pursue personal projects.

== Personal ==
Popham is married with two children and lives in Warwickshire and supports West Bromwich Albion F.C.
