= Infiniti Emerg-e =

Concept Car by Infiniti/Nissan

Infiniti Emerg-E
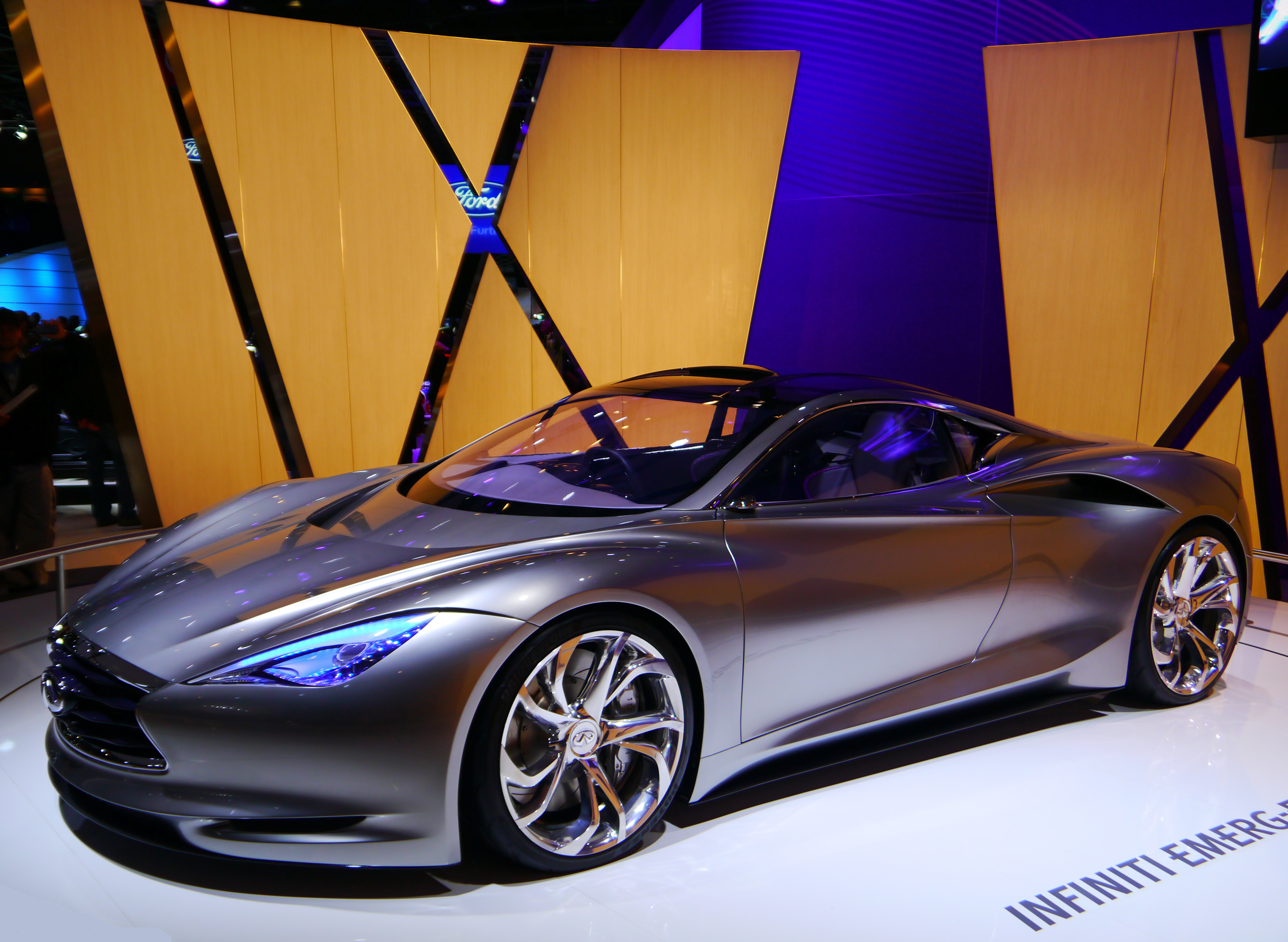

Overview
- Manufacturer: Nissan
- Production: Concept car only
- Model years: 2012
- Designer: Randy Rodriguez

Body and chassis
- Class: Concept Sports car
- Body style: 2-door coupe
- Layout: Mid-engine, RWD
- Related: Lotus Evora

Powertrain
- Engine: 1.2L Nissan HR12 SOHC I3
- Electric motor: 2 x Permanent magnet electric motors
- Transmission: Single-speed reduction
- Hybrid drivetrain: Plug-in Series hybrid
- Battery: Lithium-ion battery pack

Dimensions
- Wheelbase: 2,623.8 mm (103.3 in)
- Length: 4,462.8 mm (175.7 in)
- Width: 1,953.3 mm (76.9 in)
- Height: 1,219.2 mm (48.0 in)
- Kerb weight: 1,610 kg (3,550 lb)

The Infiniti Emerg-E is a concept sports car developed by the Infiniti division of Nissan and unveiled to the public at the 2012 Geneva Motor Show.

It is based on the Lotus Evora platform and the hybrid powertrain shown in 2012 as the Lotus 414E concept car. The Emerg-E has two electric motors, one powering each rear wheel, producing a total of 402 bhp (300 kW; 408 PS) with 738 lb⋅ft (1,001 N⋅m) of torque, and providing acceleration to 60 mph (97 km/h) in four seconds. The Emerg-E has a 30 mi (48.3 km) electric-only range, after which an onboard 47 bhp (35 kW; 48 PS) three-cylinder 1.2 L (1,200 cc) petrol engine recharges the lithium-ion battery pack. The car can also be plugged in to recharge.

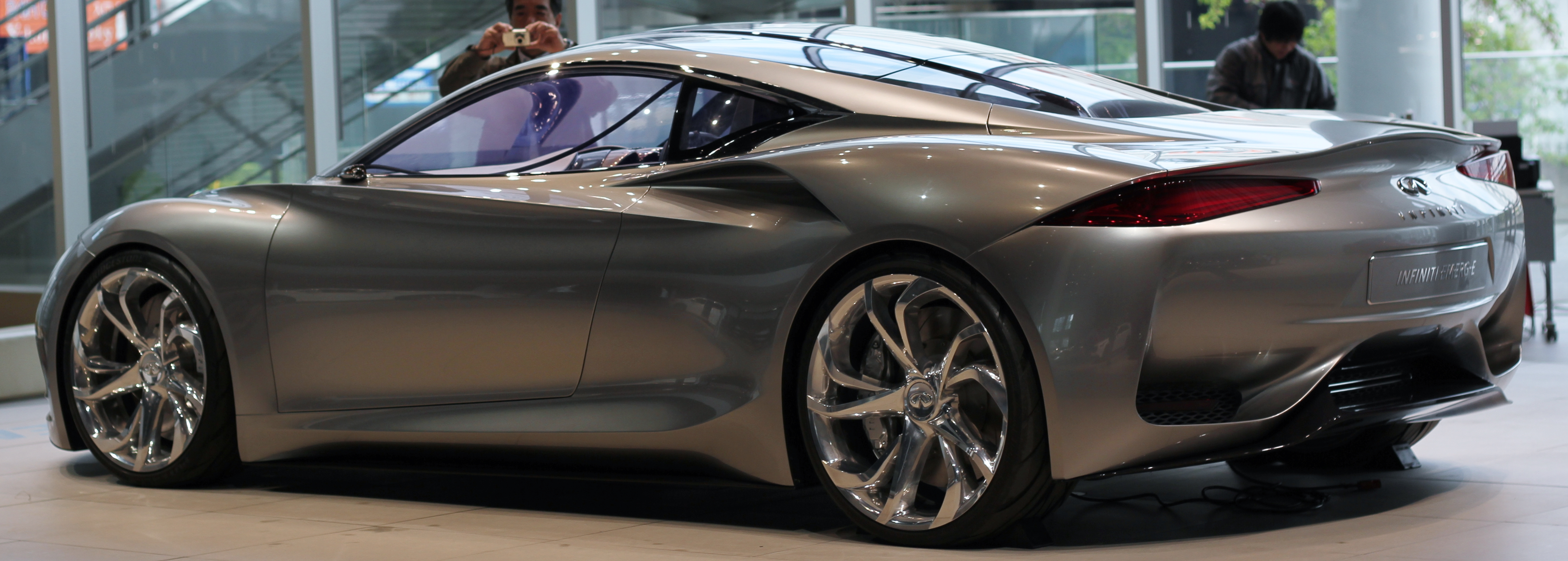
Rear view

The mid-engined two-seater sports car never reached production, but was shown as a working prototype at the 2012 Goodwood Festival of Speed.

== Project backers ==
The project was part-funded by the British government sponsored Technology Strategy Board, and involved Nissan UK's Cranfield technical centre and other British suppliers including Lola, Batteries by Castlet Ltd (Formally Amberjac Projects) and Xtrac transmissions.

== See also ==
- Nissan Esflow
