= Russell Carr =

British car designer

Russell Carr is an English car designer and was appointed head of design of Lotus Cars in 2014.

== Career ==
Russell studied Industrial Design transportation at Coventry Polytechnic, graduating in 1988. He started work at the Coventry-based MGA Developments before he joined Lotus in 1990 and worked on a number of projects before being appointed head of design in November 2014, replacing Donato Coco. When the Chinese Geely acquired Lotus in 2017, Carr remained in charge of sports car design, but reporting to Peter Horbury, whom he previously worked with in the late 1980s at MGA.

== Designs ==
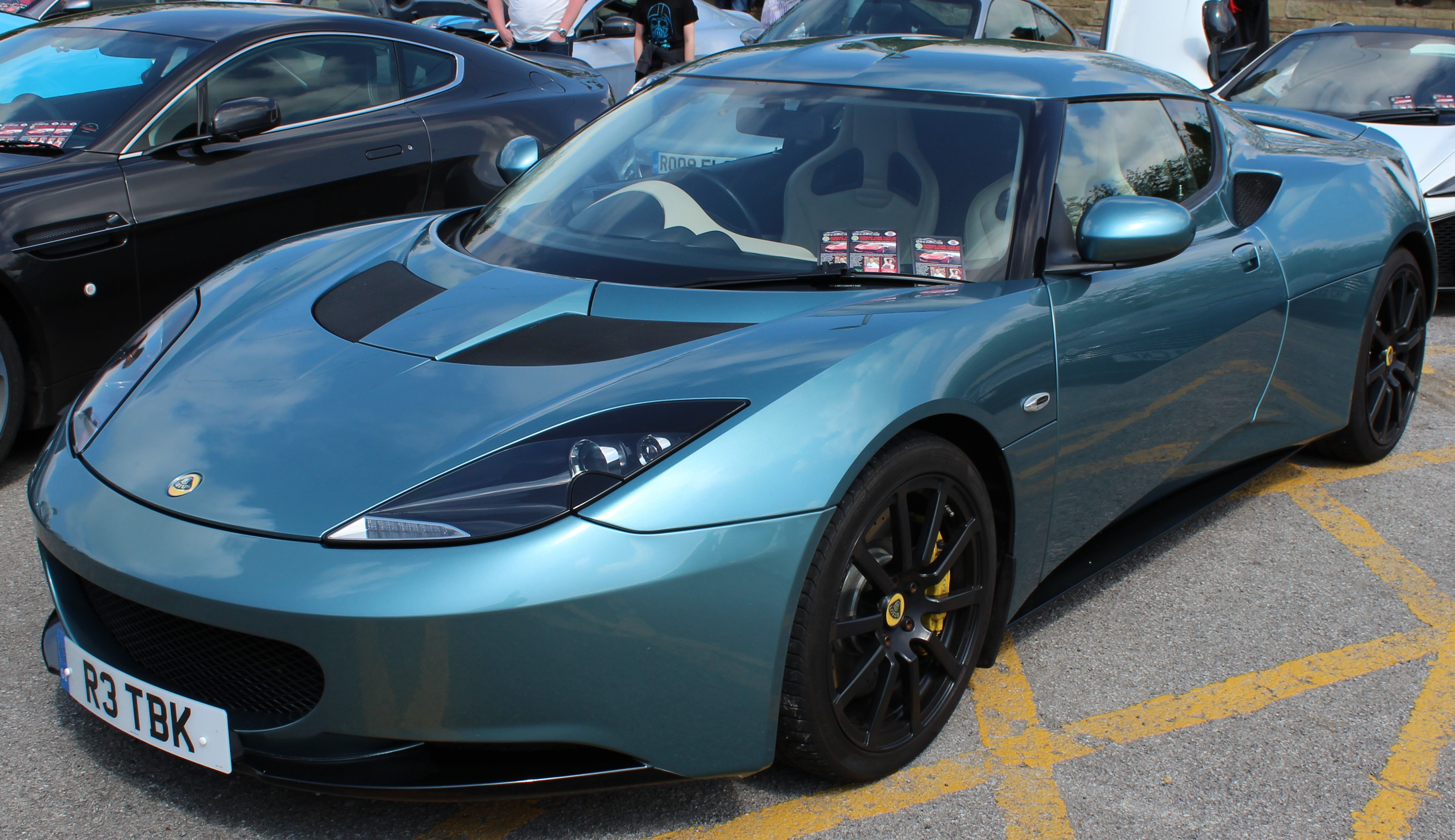
Lotus Evora

- Lotus Esprit facelift
- Lotus Europa S
- Lotus Evija
- Lotus Emira
- Lotus Evora
