= Lotus Evija =

Limited production electric sports car

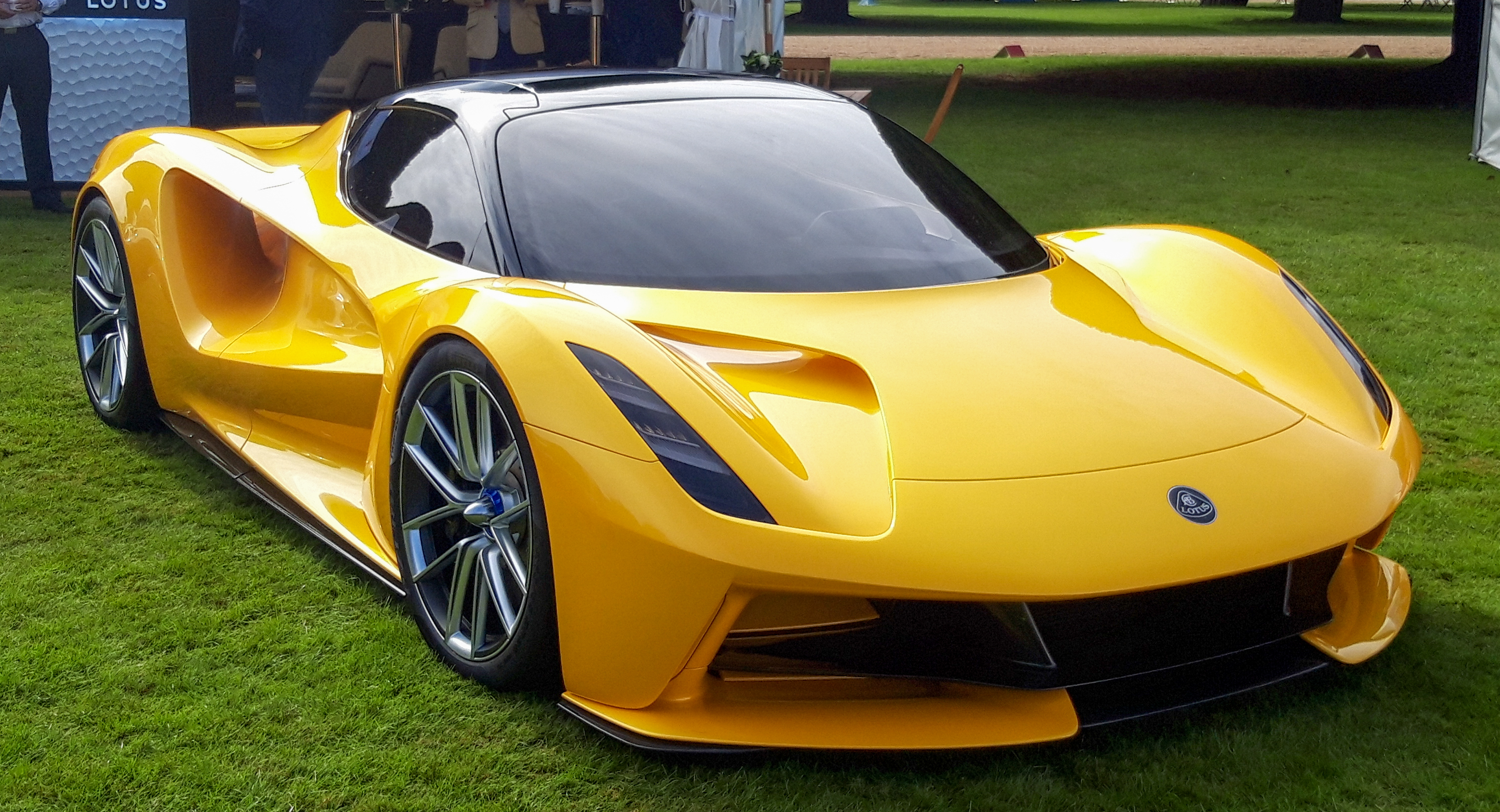
- 2020 Lotus Evija

Overview
- Manufacturer: Lotus Cars
- Also called: Lotus NYO Evija (China, 2022–2024)
- Production: July 2023 –
- Assembly: United Kingdom: Hethel, Norfolk
- Designer: Anthony Bushell and Barney Hatt under Russell Carr

Body and chassis
- Class: Sports car (S)
- Body style: 2-door coupé
- Layout: Individual-wheel drive
- Platform: Extreme
- Doors: Butterfly

Powertrain
- Electric motor: 4 electric motors, 1 placed at each wheel
- Power output: 1,500 kW (2,039 PS; 2,012 hp)
- Transmission: single-speed at each engine
- Battery: 93 kWh lithium-ion battery
- Electric range: 346 km (215 mi)

Dimensions
- Length: 4,459 mm (175.6 in)
- Width: 2,000 mm (78.7 in)
- Height: 1,122 mm (44.2 in)
- Kerb weight: 1,887 kg (4,160 lb)

The Lotus Evija is a limited production electric sports car manufactured by Chinese owned British automobile manufacturer Lotus Cars.

Unveiled in July 2019, it is the first electric vehicle introduced and manufactured by the company. Codenamed "Type 130" and "Omega", its production will be limited to 130 units.

The Evija prototype underwent high-speed testing in November 2019. A video was released on 21 November 2019 ahead of its debut later that day at the Guangzhou Auto Show. Lotus said it was planning thousands of miles of further road testing, on circuits in Europe and on Lotus's own track at Hethel.

The Evija is set at US$2.3 million, before options and taxes.

== Name ==
The name Evija is derived from Eve of the Abrahamic religions, a name whose etymology can be traced back to the Biblical Hebrew חי, meaning 'alive', or 'living'. Lotus Cars CEO Phil Popham said: "Evija is the perfect name for our new car because it is the first all-new car to come from Lotus as part of the wider Geely family. With Geely's support, we are set to create an incredible range of new cars which are true to the Lotus name and DNA."

== Specifications ==
The Evija was initially powered by a 70 kilowatt-hours (250 MJ) battery pack developed in conjunction with Williams Advanced Engineering, with electric motors supplied by Integral Powertrain. In 2022 Lotus switched to a 93 kilowatt-hours (330 MJ) battery, which Unipart's Hyperbat claims to supply. The four individual motors are placed at the wheels and each is rated at 375 kW (510 PS; 503 hp), for a combined total output of 1,500 kW (2,039 PS; 2,011 hp) and 1,704 N⋅m (1,257 lb⋅ft) of torque. The Evija has magnesium wheels with diameters of 510 mm (20 in) at the front and 530 mm (21 in) at the rear. It uses Pirelli Trofeo R tyres and AP Racing carbon ceramic disc brakes. Lotus claims the Evija will be able to accelerate from 0 to 100 km/h (62 mph) in under 3 seconds, from 0 to 300 km/h (190 mph) in 9.1 seconds, and achieve a limited top speed of 349 km/h (217 mph).

== Production ==
Lotus announced in 2020 that production was to begin that summer, but was delayed to 2021 due to the COVID-19 pandemic. In 2022, it announced "Eight cars now in build, all sold with first customer deliveries early in 2023." The first car was delivered to Jenson Button in August 2023. In December 2024, Lotus announced again that customer deliveries are underway.

== Gallery ==
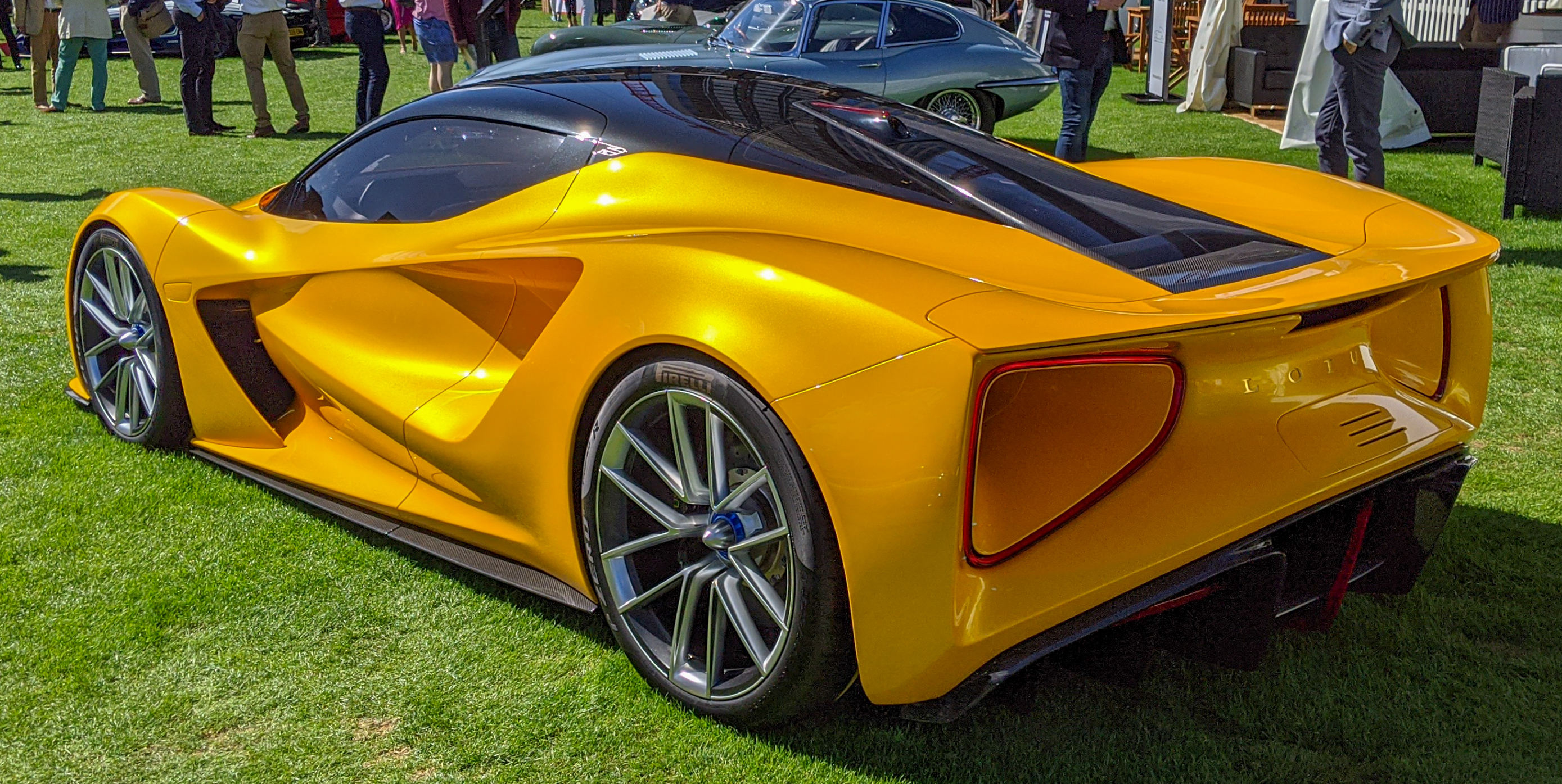
Rear view

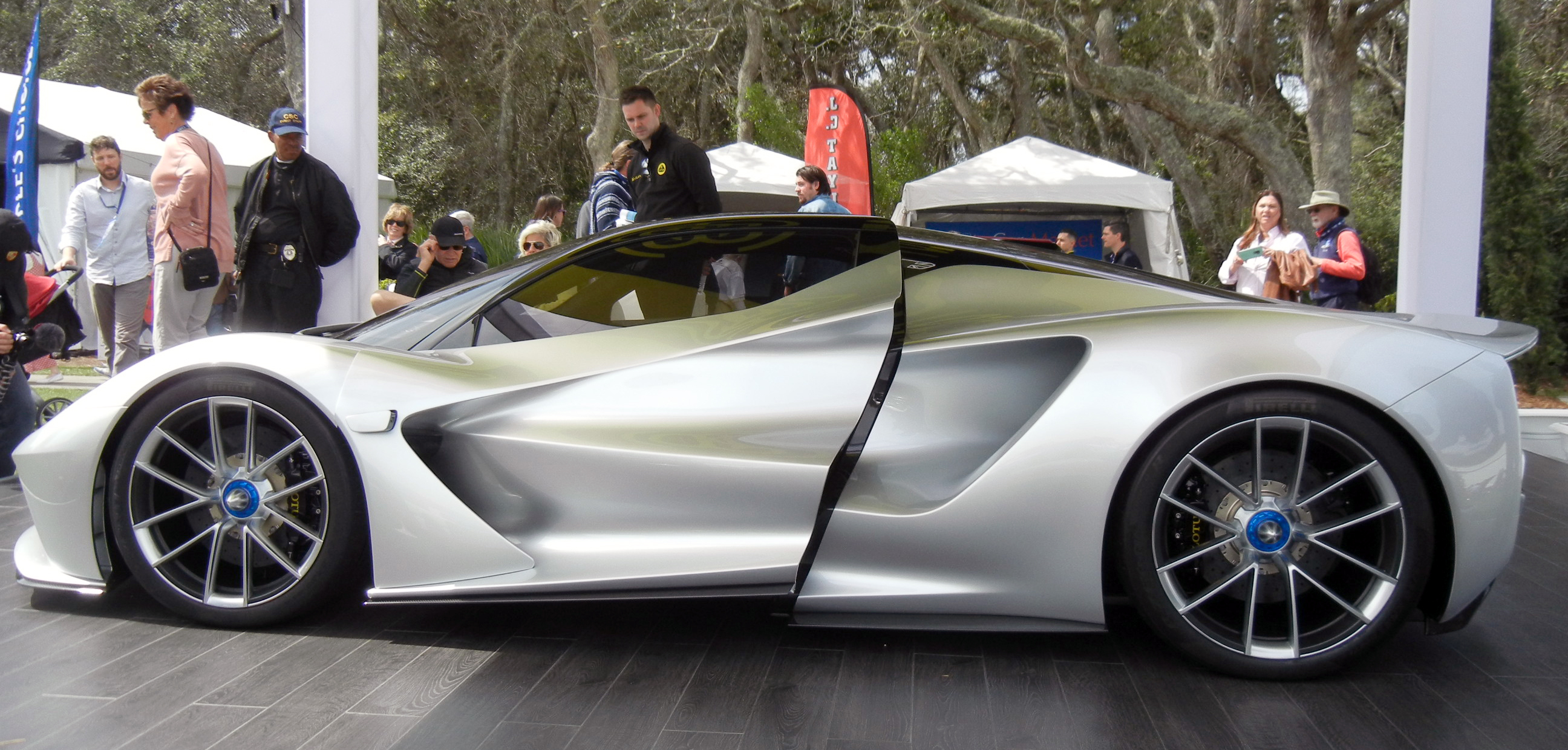
Side view

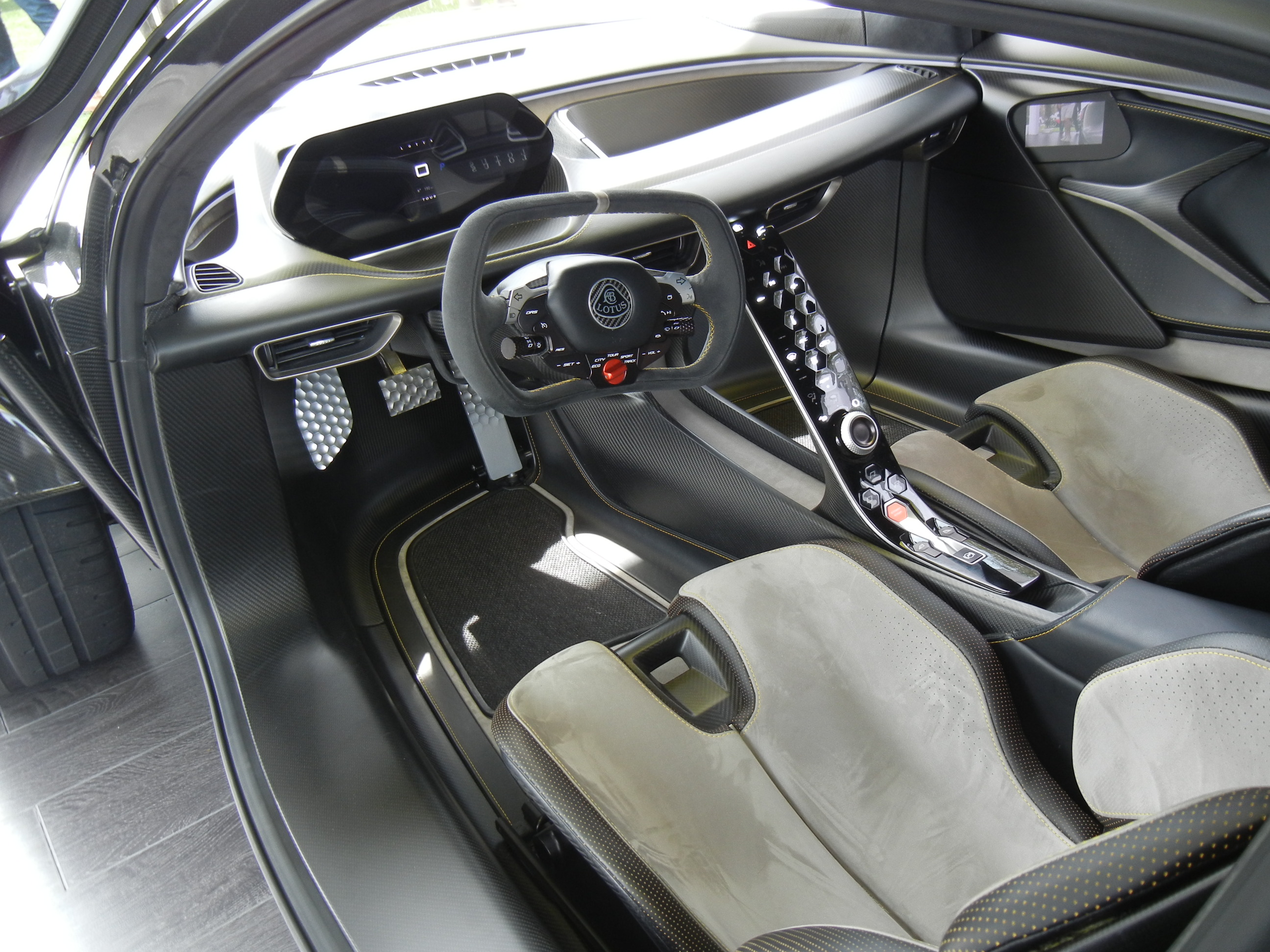
Interior view

== See also ==
- List of production cars by power output
