= Lotus Evora =

Sports car made by Lotus

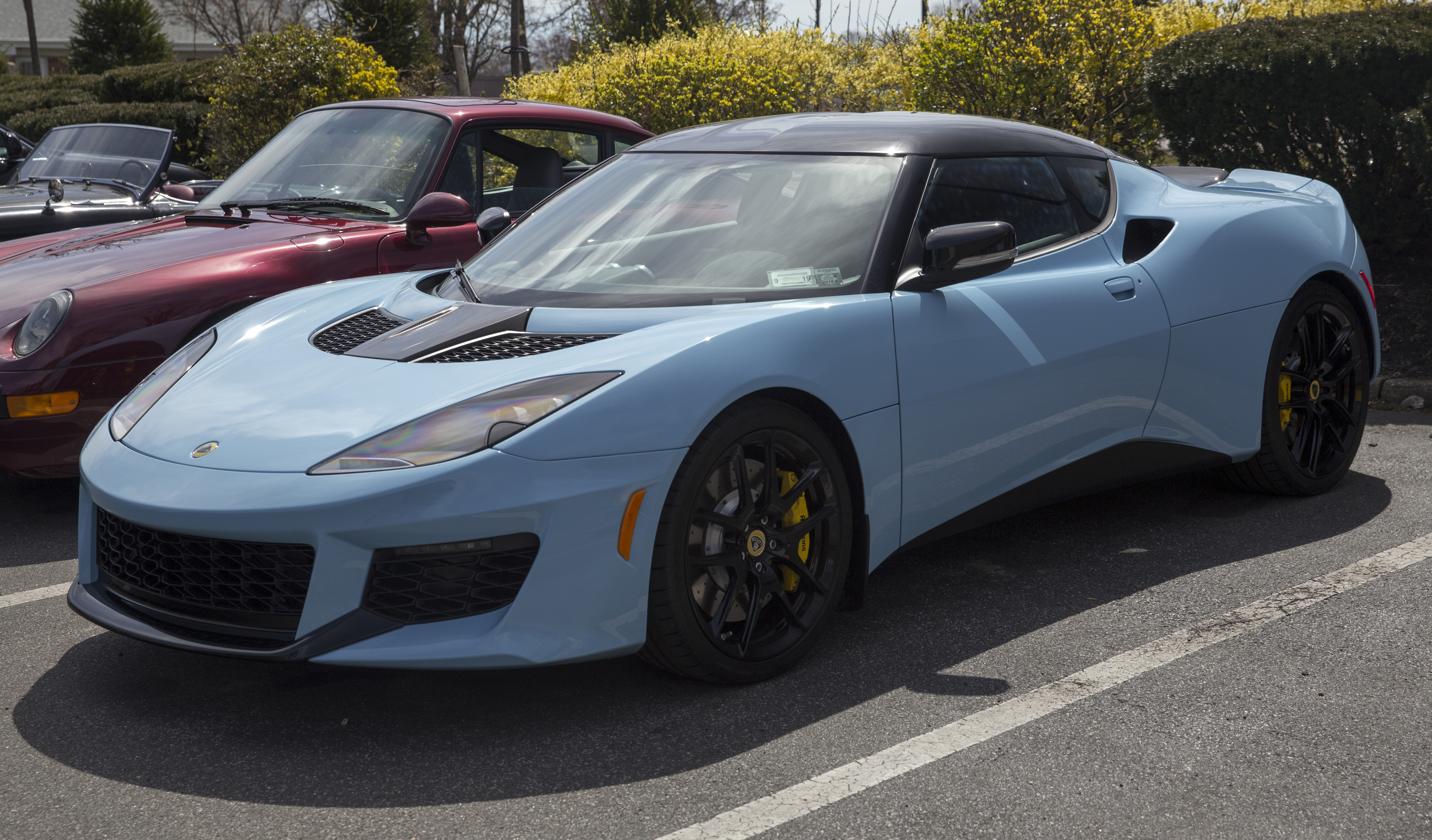
- Lotus Evora 400

Overview
- Manufacturer: Lotus Cars
- Production: 2009–2021; 6,117 produced
- Model years: 2010–2021
- Assembly: United Kingdom: Hethel, Norfolk, England
- Designer: Russell Carr

Body and chassis
- Class: Sports car (S)
- Body style: 2-door coupé 2-door 2+2 coupé
- Layout: Transverse mid-engine, rear-wheel drive
- Related: Lotus 3-Eleven; Infiniti Emerg-e

Powertrain
- Engine: 3.5 L Toyota 2GR-FE V6; 3.5 L Toyota 2GR-FE supercharged V6
- Transmission: 6-speed Aisin AI manual 6-speed Aisin AI IPS automatic

Dimensions
- Wheelbase: 2,575 mm (101.4 in)
- Length: 4,395 mm (173.0 in)
- Width: 1,848 mm (72.8 in); 1,858 mm (73.1 in) (Evora GT)
- Height: 1,229 mm (48.4 in)
- Kerb weight: 1,248 kg (2,751 lb)–1,442 kg (3,179 lb)

Chronology
- Successor: Lotus Emira

The Lotus Evora is a sports car produced by British automaker Lotus. The car, which was developed under the project name Project Eagle, was launched on 22 July 2008 at the British International Motor Show. The Evora S was launched in 2010 with a supercharged 3.5-litre V6. The facelifted and more powerful Evora 400 model was unveiled at the 2015 Geneva Motor Show, followed by another more powerful variant, the Evora GT430, which was unveiled in 2017.

The Lotus Evora is based on the first all-new vehicle platform from Lotus Cars since the introduction of the Lotus Elise in 1995 (the Exige and the 2006 Europa S are both derivatives of the Elise). The Evora was planned to be the first of three vehicles to be built on the same platform. The sales target was 2,000 cars per year, with prices between £45,000 and just over £50,000, with sales in the United States scheduled from the beginning of 2010.

== Overview ==
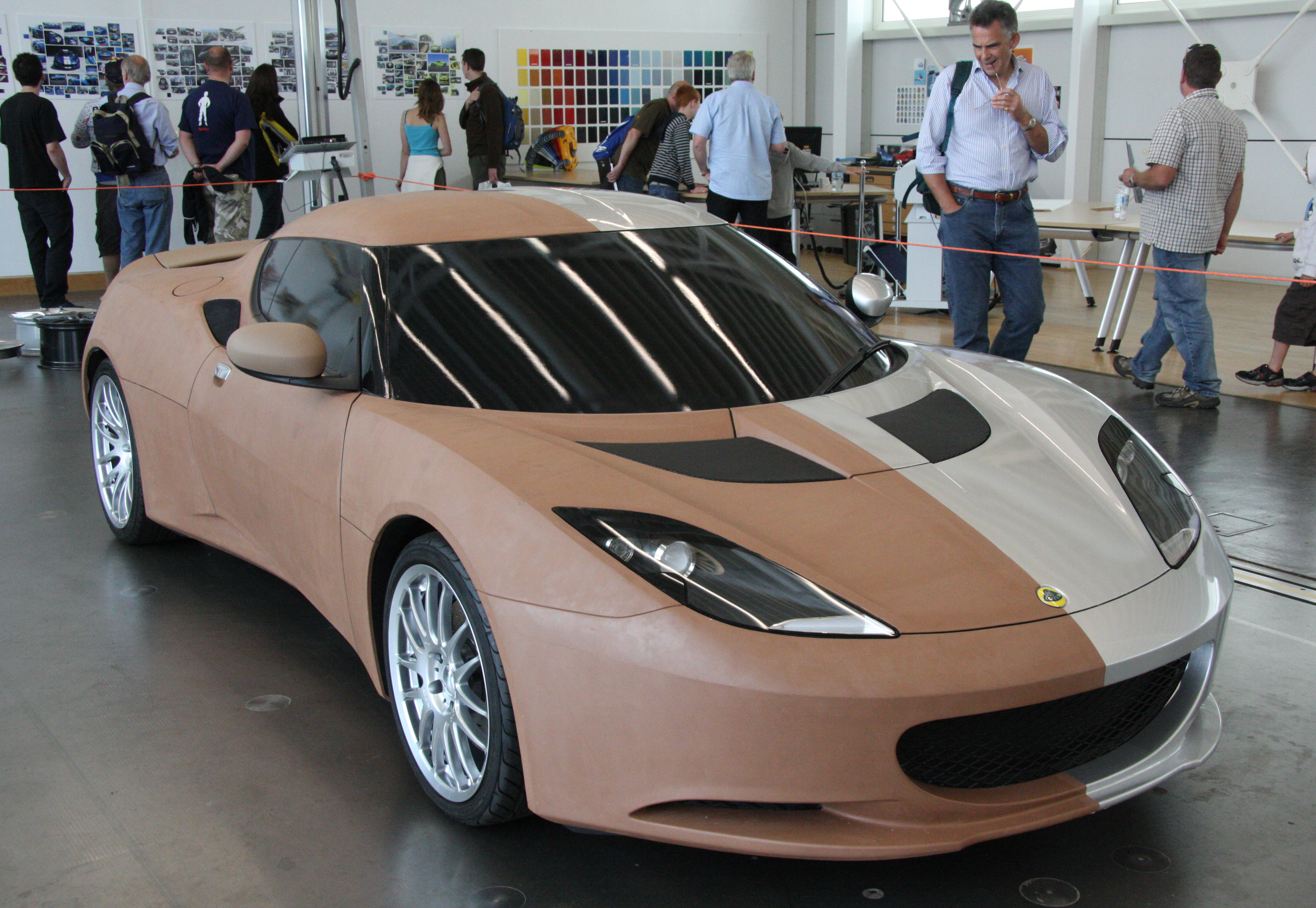
Lotus Evora clay model

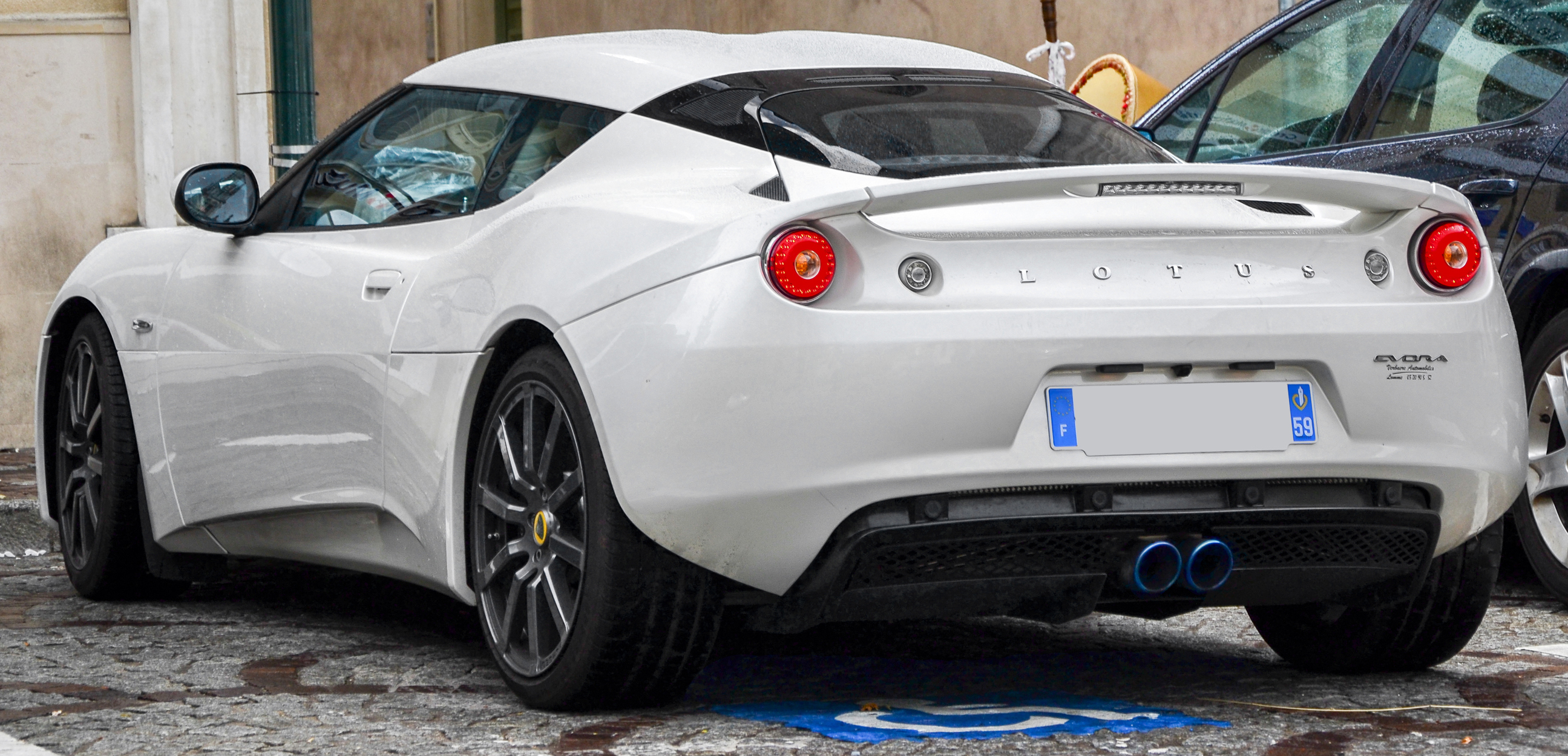
Rear view

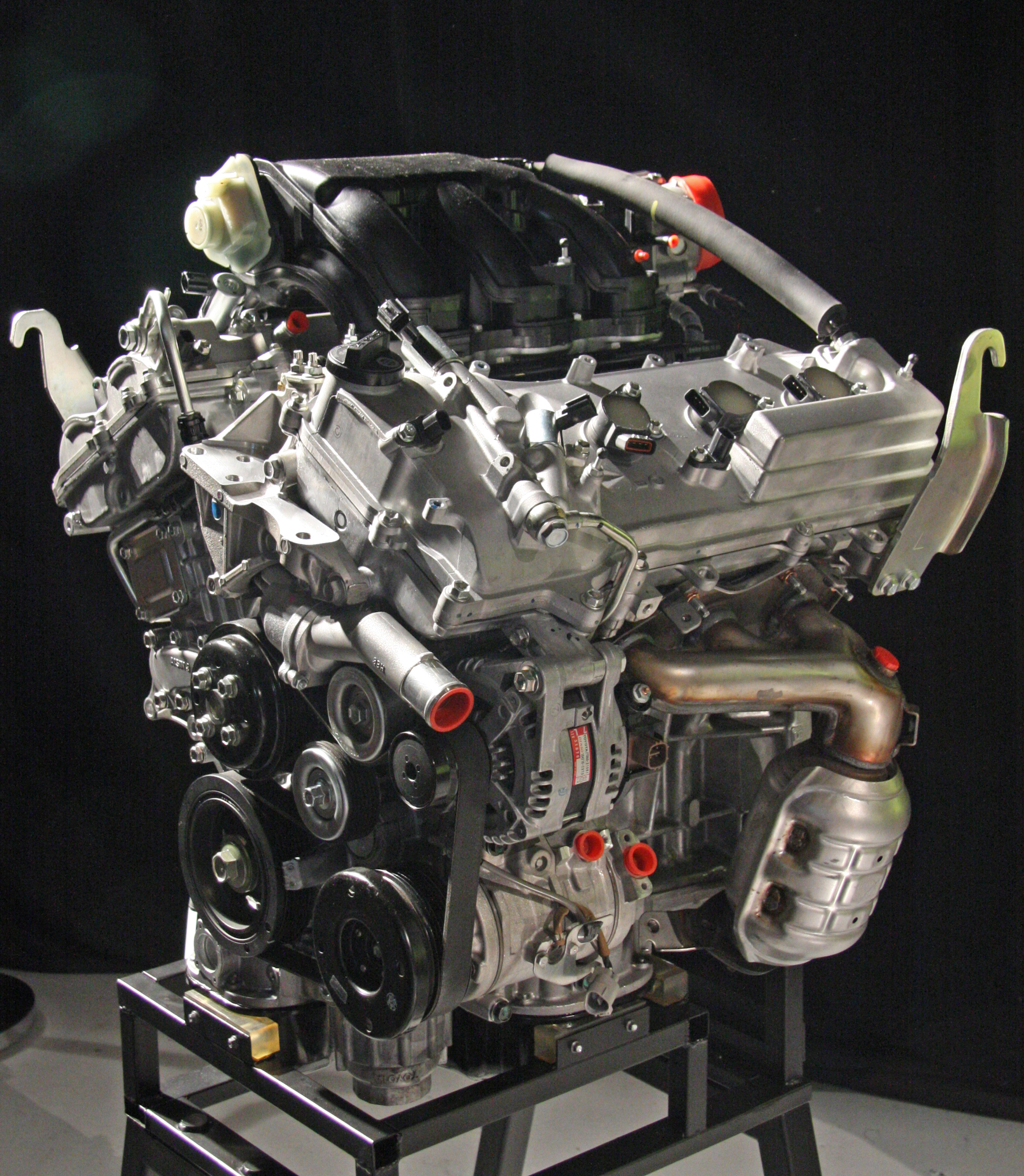
engine

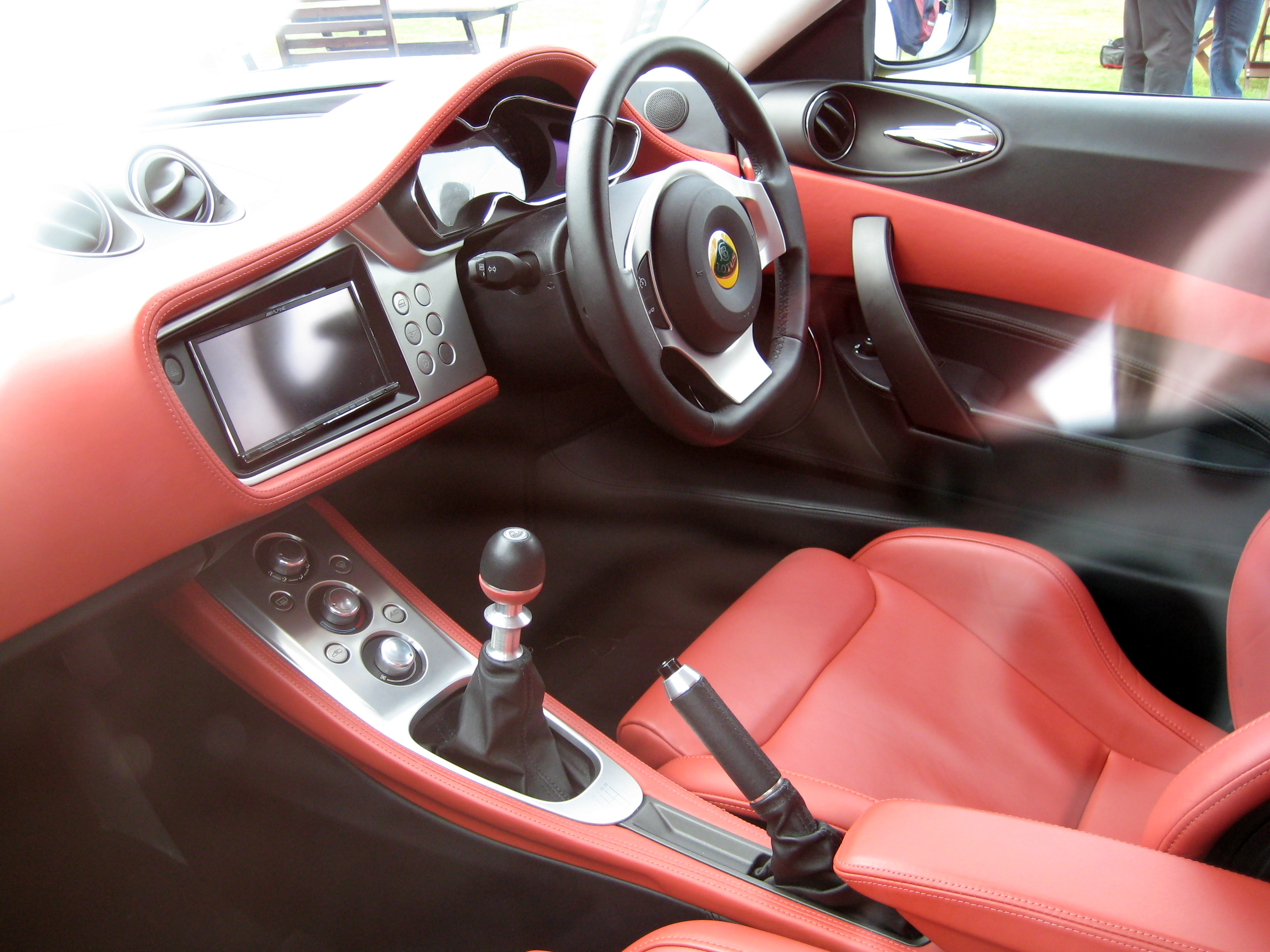
Interior

The Evora is the first product of a five-year plan started in 2006 to expand the Lotus lineup beyond its track-specialized offerings and produce a practical road car that would appeal to the mainstream market. As such, it is larger than recent Elise models and its derivatives (the Exige, Europa S, etc.), with an unladen weight of 1,383 kg (3,049 lb), and the automatic version weighing in at 1,442 kg (3,179 lb). The Evora is currently the only Lotus model with a 2+2 configuration, although it could also be offered in a two-seater configuration, referred to as the "Plus Zero" option. The Evora and the BMW i8 are the only 2+2 mid-engine coupés on sale. The interior is larger to accommodate taller passengers, such as former Lotus CEO Mike Kimberley and two people of 6'5" (195.6 cm).

The cooled boot behind the engine is large enough to fit a set of golf clubs, although Lotus design head Russell Carr denies that this was intentional. Lotus intended for the Evora to compete in different market sectors, including that of the Porsche 911.

== Name ==
The Evora name keeps the Lotus tradition of model names that begin with an E. The name is derived from the words evolution, vogue and aura. Other names considered were Eagle, Exira and Ethos; Eagle and Ethos were rejected because they would be difficult for Lotus to claim as a trademark.

== Specifications ==
The Evora is equipped with a mid-mounted, transverse, Toyota-sourced 3.5-litre 24-valve 2GR-FE V6 engine. The Evora S uses the same engine but with a supercharger. Both versions are available with either a six-speed manual or six-speed automatic transmission with "Intelligent Precision Shift," manufactured by Aisin. The Evora has a drag coefficient of Cd=0.337. It is constructed on a lightweight aluminium tub with an additional front crash structure also made from aluminium, along with a steel rear sub-frame that houses the drivetrain. The chassis was designed to utilize proprietary 6000 Series alloy extrusions, which are bonded with an epoxy based adhesive and riveted together to increase torsional rigidity. The Evora also utilises a forged-aluminium, double-wishbone suspension with Bilstein high-performance gas dampers and Eibach coaxial coil springs. Hydraulically assisted power steering is included for increased manoeuvrability.

Lotus Evora at Goodwood Festival of Speed 2010

== Models ==
=== Evora S ===
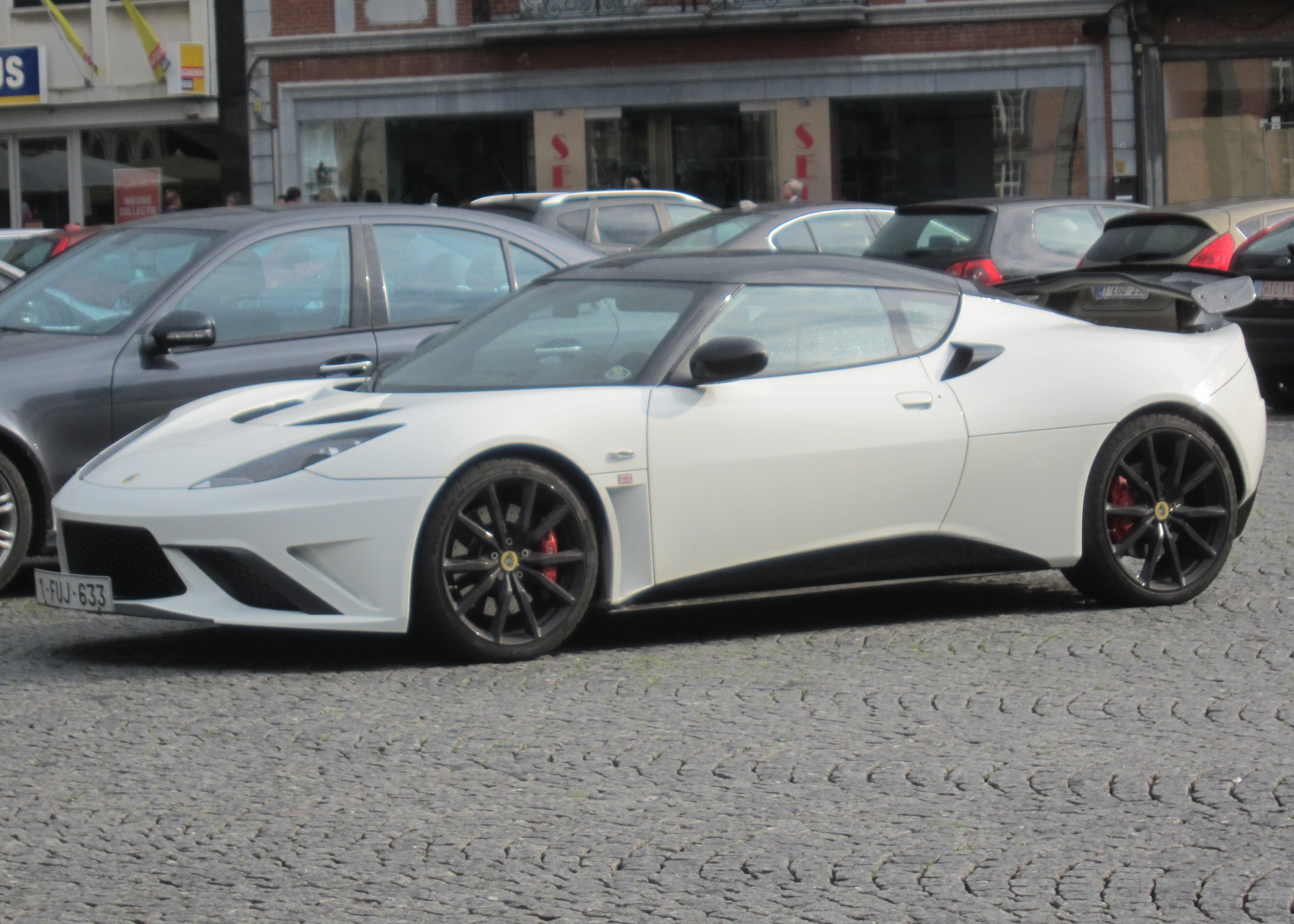
Lotus Evora S with Mansory body kit

In 2010, Lotus unveiled a high-performance variant of the Evora called the Evora S. The "S" in the name stands for "supercharged," but the engine is not intercooled. The car has the same standard design but is more powerful, now rated at 345 hp (257 kW; 350 PS) and 295 lb⋅ft (400 N⋅m) of torque powered by a new supercharger manufactured by Harrop. The car's exhaust was also replaced with a single-tubed exhaust system. The suspension's dampers were recalibrated to suit the vehicle's new suspension characteristics, and the steering also received recalibration.

The car was able to accelerate from 0-60 mph (97 km/h) in 4.6 seconds, with a top speed of 172 mph (277 km/h).

Lotus ceased production of the S in 2014 and later replaced it and the standard Evora with a new variant called the Evora 400 in 2015.

The Romanian police have an Evora S in their lineup as of 2012.

=== Evora 400 ===
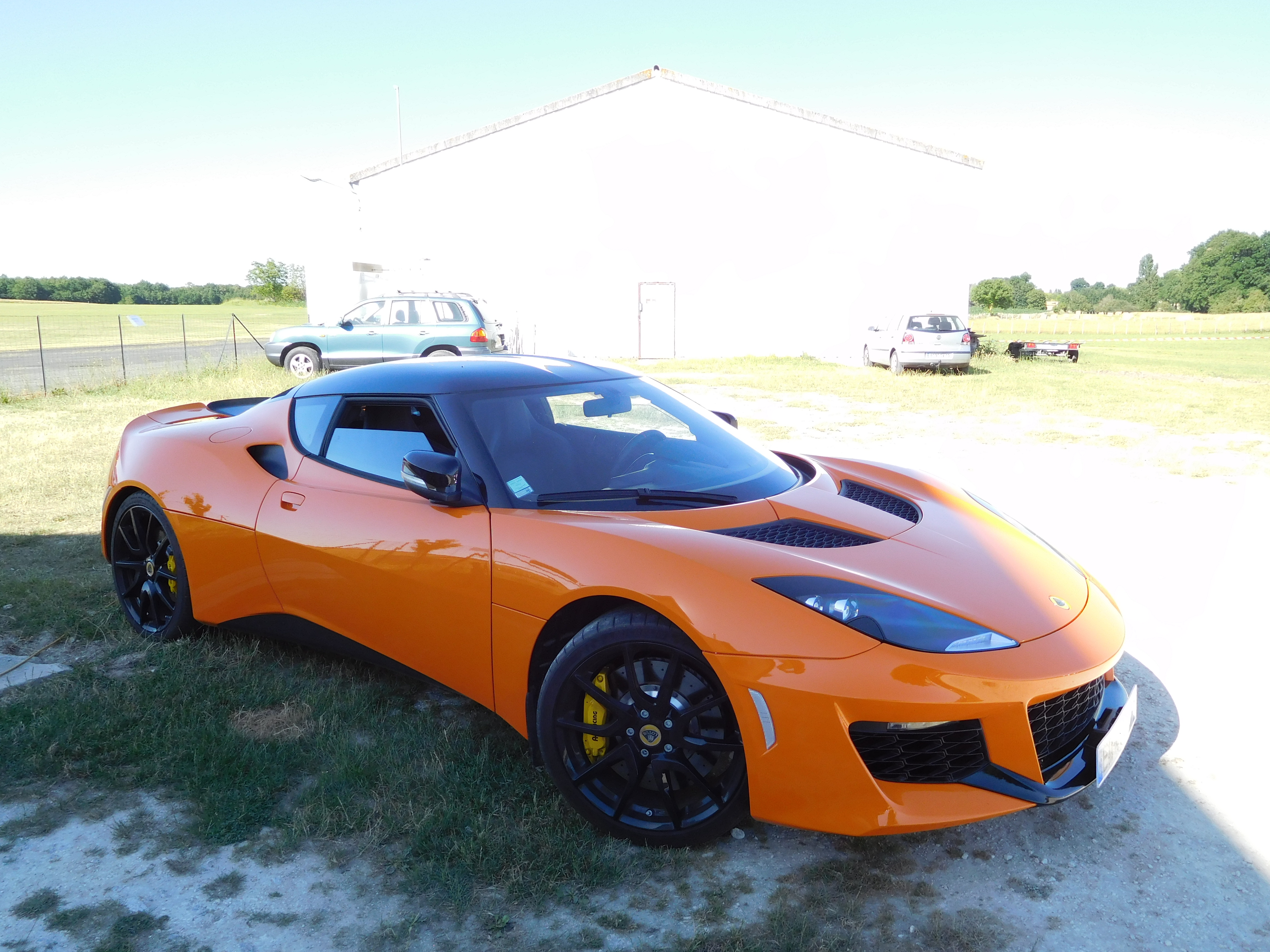
Evora 400

The Evora 400 is a new variant that replaces the Evora and the Evora S. The "400" in the name is a reference to the vehicle's horsepower rating. The improved engine output of 400 hp (298 kW; 406 PS) and 302 lb⋅ft (409 N⋅m) of torque is made possible by an intercooled supercharger developed by Edelbrock. The Evora 400 has an all-new body kit design, which helps produce an extra 23 kg (51 lb) of downforce. The exhaust has a new driver-activated system that allows the driver to increase the roar of the exhaust. The interior was slightly revised, notably with narrower sills for simplified entry and exit, a new dashboard design and a new centre-console design. The wheel set was also different, with forged wheels as a new option. The wing was changed to a split rear wing. The car has a total weight of 1,395 kg (3,075 lb).

Acceleration from 0+60 mph (97 km/h) is at 4.1 seconds, 0.5 seconds faster than that of the S variant. The 400 can attain a top speed of 186 mph (299 km/h).

=== Evora Sport 410 ===
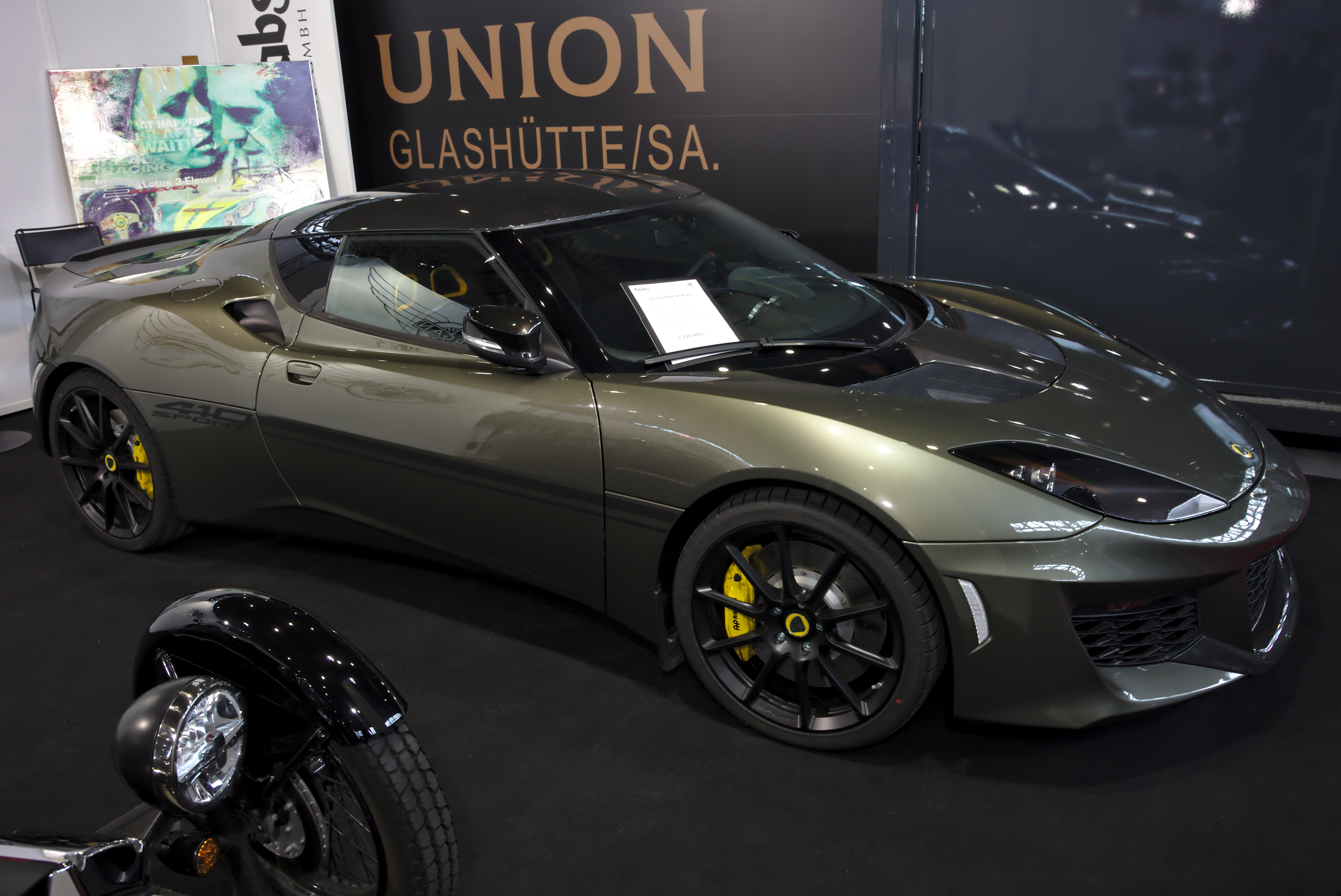
Lotus Evora Sport 410

At the 2016 Geneva Motor Show, Lotus unveiled the Evora Sport 410, a slightly enhanced version of the 400. The car's 3.5-liter Toyota-derived V6 received a power increase by 10 hp (7 kW; 10 PS), for a total of 410 hp (306 kW; 416 PS). The torque was also improved to 310 lb⋅ft (420 N⋅m).

The exterior was changed with the addition of a carbon-fibre roof, tailgate and front access panel. The wheels were further lightened and a lithium-ion battery was fitted rather than the traditional lead acid version. Inside, the rear seats were removed and one-piece carbon-fibre bucket seats were fitted. Overall weight was reduced to 1,325 kg (2,921 lb).

The performance figures were improved with the 0-60 mph (97 km/h) acceleration time now at 3.9 seconds, and a top speed of 190 mph (306 km/h). However, if the IPS automatic transmission system is used, top speed is reduced to 174 mph (280 km/h).

=== Evora GT430 ===
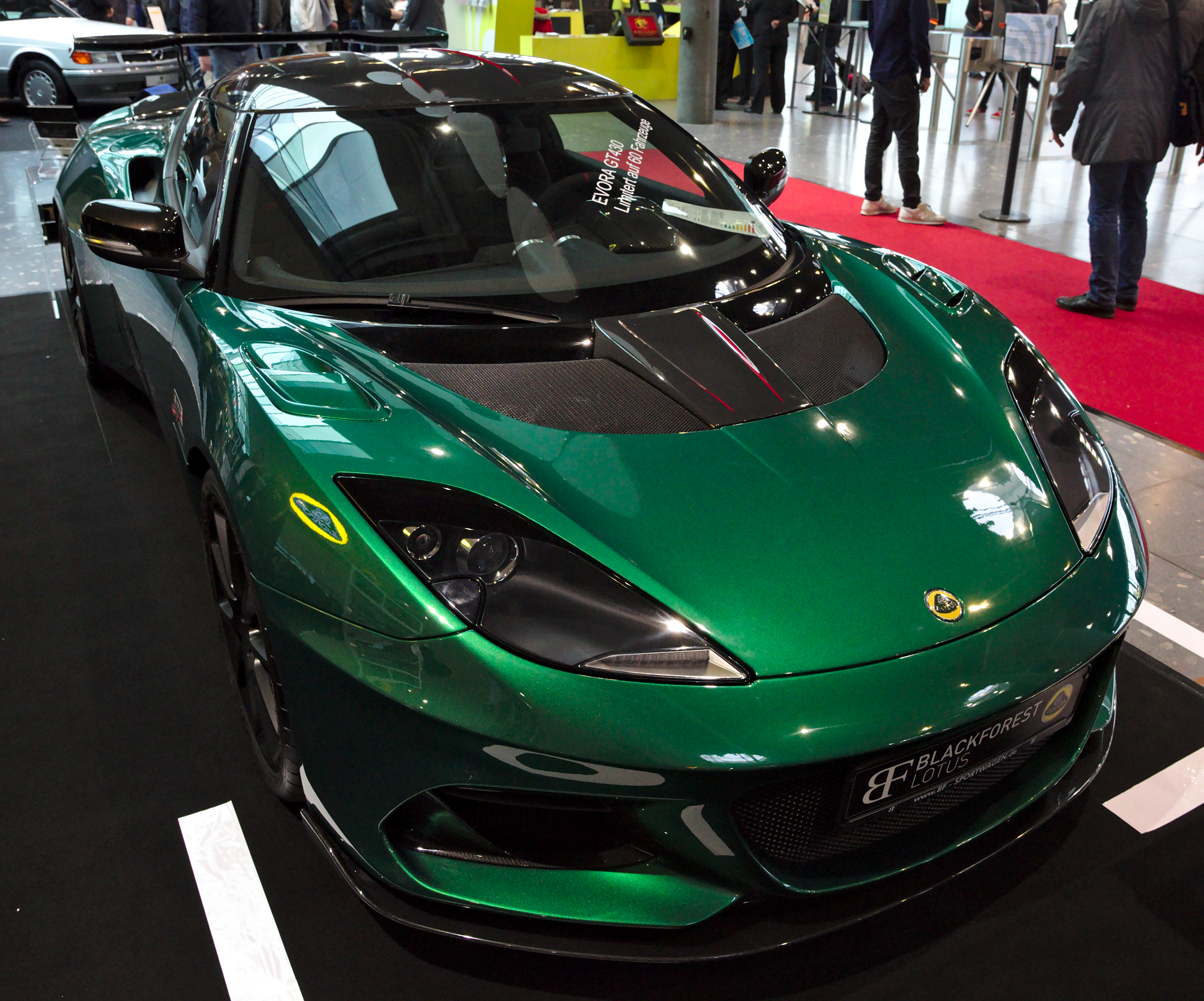
Lotus Evora GT430

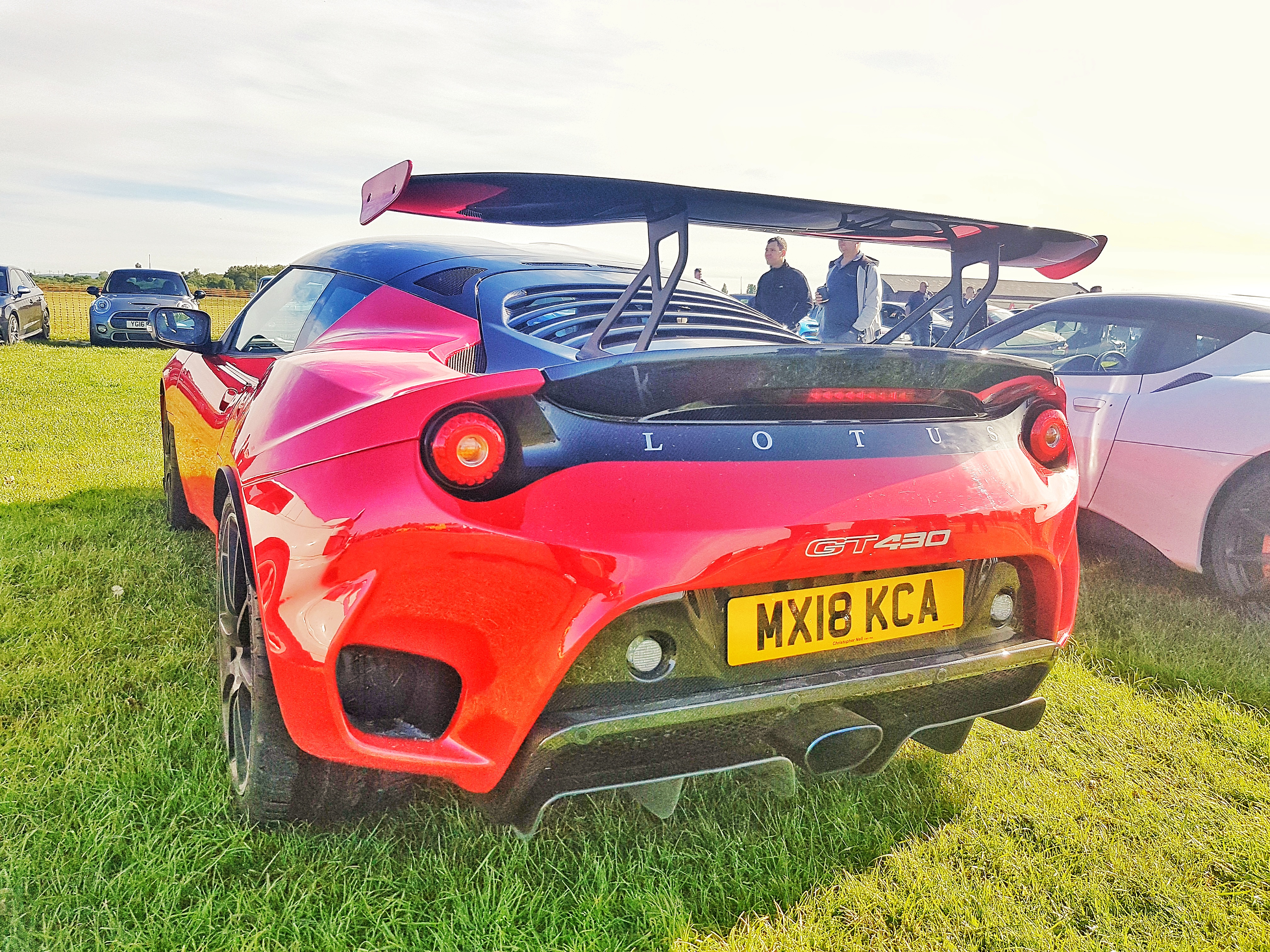
Rear view

In 2017, Lotus unveiled the most powerful variant of the Evora and also the fastest street-legal vehicle that Lotus has ever produced, the Evora GT430, though only 60 units were planned. The model is part of an entirely new range in the Evora family called the performance range. The car's 3.5-liter Toyota-derived V6 has an increased power output of 430 hp (321 kW; 436 PS) powered by an Edelbrock supercharger and a titanium exhaust system. The torque figures were also improved to 325 lb⋅ft (441 N⋅m) for manual-transmission models and 332 lb⋅ft (450 N⋅m) for models with automatic transmission made possible by launch control and fast gear-change ratios. The GT430 is also the lightest Evora and weighs 1,258 kg (2,773 lb) for manual-transmission models and 1,310 kg (2,888 lb) for automatic-transmission models. The cars with automatic transmission weigh more because of the gear box and its cooling system. Top speed also varies for manual and automatic cars because of gearbox differences, rated at 174 mph (280 km/h) for automatic cars and 190 mph (306 km/h) for manual cars. Because of the increased torque, the automatic-transmission cars have a slightly shorter 0-60 mph (97 km/h) acceleration time of 3.6 seconds, compared with 3.7 seconds for manual-transmission cars. The GT430 also generates more downforce (250 kg at 190 mph) than did its previous variants.

The GT430 has a new and aggressive body kit that features a larger carbon-fibre rear wing, larger air intakes, forged aluminium wheels, polycarbonate lights and carbon-fibre bodywork to keep the weight low. The interior is also stripped down to save weight and the rear seats have been removed. The GT430 has carbon-fiber interior components and racing seats. It also features a plaque signifying the car's production number. The creature comforts are retained, with air conditioning included as standard.

=== Evora GT430 Sport and GT410 Sport ===
Later in 2017, Lotus unveiled another variant of the Evora GT430 called the Evora GT430 Sport. It features a more aerodynamic body and removes the GT430's rear wing for smoother airflow and reduced drag. This helps increase the top speed to 196 mph (315 km/h), with the automatic version having a top speed of 174 mph (280 km/h).

To celebrate its 70th anniversary, Lotus unveiled the new Evora GT410 Sport. Available as a two-seater or 2+2, the GT410 Sport takes the GT430's basic shape and adds new composite front and rear body panels minus some of the 430's higher downforce pieces for a subtler shape. The revised front panel has larger carbon-fibre air ducts that move air around the front wheels more efficiently, cutting turbulence and drag. Deeper front and rear splitters and carbon ducts behind the rear wheels add downforce, which is increased by 211 pounds. Other carbon pieces include the front-access panel, roof panel and rear decklid. The car is powered by the same engine powering the rest of the Evora lineup, rated at 410 hp (306 kW) and 310 lb⋅ft (420 N⋅m) of torque, allowing for a 0-to-60 mph acceleration time of 3.9 seconds with the manual and four seconds with the six-speed automatic. The car weighs 2,859 lb (1,297 kg), 62 lb (28 kg) less than the 410.

=== Evora GT ===
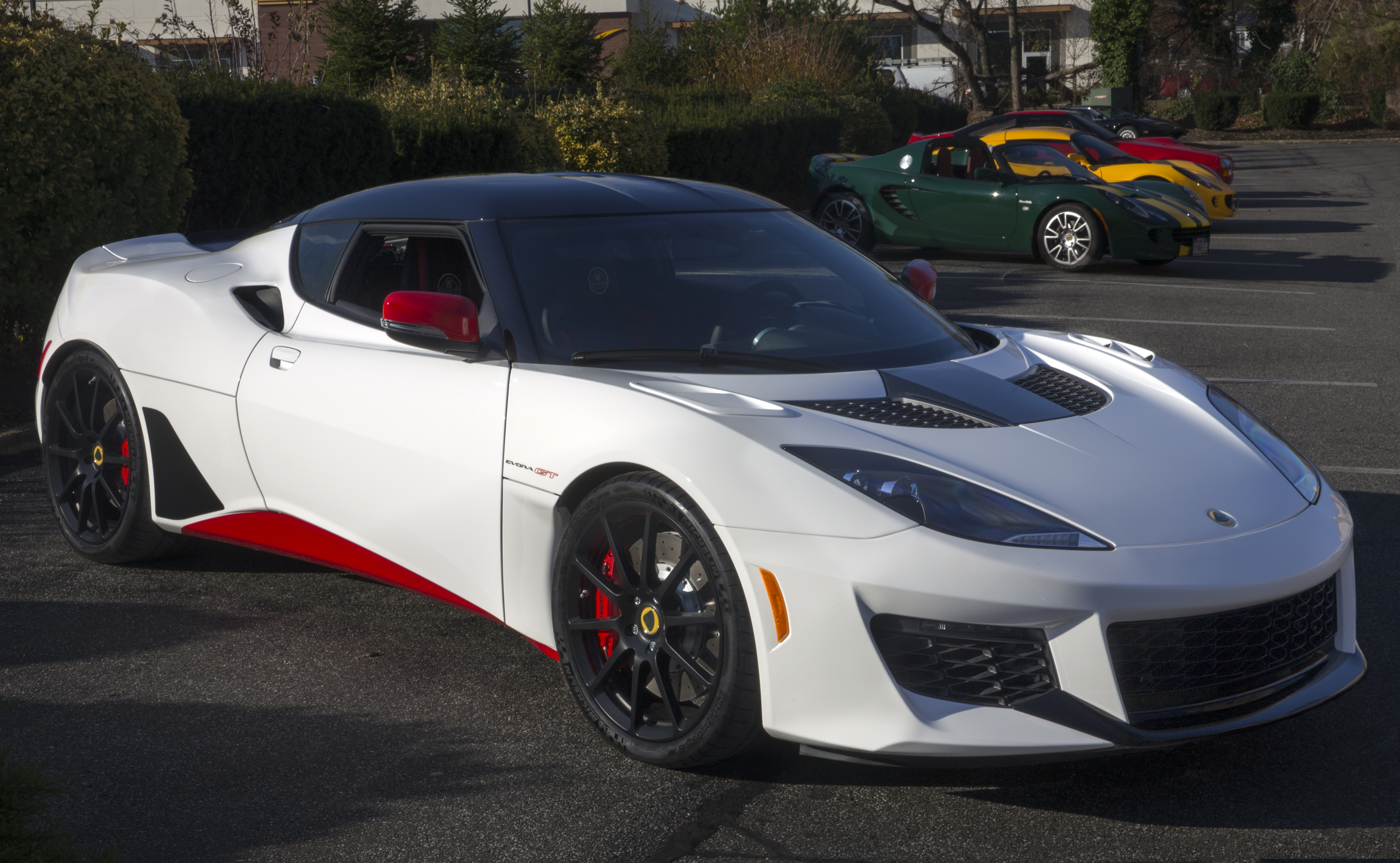
2020 Lotus Evora GT

In June 2019, for the 2020 model year, Lotus introduced the Evora GT for the North American market only. This car uses the same supercharged 3.5-liter V6 like the rest of the line-up but is rated at 416 hp (310 kW; 422 PS) and 317 lb⋅ft (430 N⋅m) for the manual and 332 lb⋅ft (450 N⋅m) for the automatic. Manual-transmission cars feature a standard Torsen rear differential. Regardless of transmission choice, the 0-60 mph (97 km/h) acceleration time is estimated at 3.8 seconds. The automatic version can reach 174 mph (280 km/h) and the manual's top speed is 188 mph (303 km/h). The GT uses some of the same aero components as the GT410 Sport, which helps it produce 141 lb (64 kg) of downforce at maximum speed. This variant of the Evora weighs between 3,104 lb (1,408 kg) and 3,199 lb (1,451 kg) depending on which options are selected. The optional Carbon Pack includes a carbon fibre roof, rear tailgate, and front access panel, which reduces weight by 49 lb (22 kg). The optional titanium exhaust reduces weight further by 22 lb (10 kg). The manual transmission weighs 24 lb (11 kg) less than the automatic. The Evora GT was discontinued after the 2021 model year and was replaced by the all-new Lotus Emira in Spring 2022. 6,117 Evora have been produced overall.

== Specifications by Model ==
| Model | Power | Torque | Emissions CO_{2} | Top speed | Acceleration 0–60 mph (0–97 km/h) | Economy (combined) |
|---|---|---|---|---|---|---|
| Evora | 280 PS (206 kW; 276 hp) at 6,400 rpm | 350 N⋅m (258 lb⋅ft) at 4,600 rpm | 217 g/km | 163 mph (262 km/h) | 4.8 seconds | 30.3 mpg_{‑imp} (9.3 L/100 km; 25.2 mpg_{‑US}) |
| Evora IPS | 280 PS (206 kW; 276 hp) at 6,400 rpm | 350 N⋅m (258 lb⋅ft) at 4,600 rpm | 210 g/km | 159 mph (256 km/h) | 5.0 seconds | 31.4 mpg_{‑imp} (9.0 L/100 km; 26.1 mpg_{‑US}) |
| Evora S | 350 PS (257 kW; 345 hp) at 7,000 rpm | 400 N⋅m (295 lb⋅ft) at 4,500 rpm | 229 g/km | 178 mph (286 km/h) | 4.4 seconds | 28.7 mpg_{‑imp} (9.8 L/100 km; 23.9 mpg_{‑US}) |
| Evora S IPS | 350 PS (257 kW; 345 hp) at 7,000 rpm | 400 N⋅m (295 lb⋅ft) at 4,500 rpm | 224 g/km | 167 mph (269 km/h) | 4.5 seconds | 29.3 mpg_{‑imp} (9.6 L/100 km; 24.4 mpg_{‑US}) |
| Evora 400 | 406 PS (299 kW; 400 hp) at 7,000 rpm | 410 N⋅m (302 lb⋅ft) at 3,500 rpm | 225 g/km | 186 mph (299 km/h) | 4.1 seconds | 29.1 mpg_{‑imp} (9.7 L/100 km; 24.2 mpg_{‑US}) |
| Evora 400 IPS | 406 PS (299 kW; 400 hp) at 7,000 rpm | 410 N⋅m (302 lb⋅ft) at 3,500 rpm | 230 g/km | 174 mph (280 km/h) | 4.1 seconds | 29.1 mpg_{‑imp} (9.7 L/100 km; 24.2 mpg_{‑US}) |
| Evora Sport 410 | 416 PS (306 kW; 410 hp) at 7,000 rpm | 420 N⋅m (310 lb⋅ft) at 3,500 rpm | 225 g/km | 190 mph (306 km/h) | 4.0 seconds | 29.1 mpg_{‑imp} (9.7 L/100 km; 24.2 mpg_{‑US}) |
| Evora Sport 410 IPS | 416 PS (306 kW; 410 hp) at 7,000 rpm | 420 N⋅m (310 lb⋅ft) at 3,500 rpm | 230 g/km | 174 mph (280 km/h) | 4.1 seconds | 29.1 mpg_{‑imp} (9.7 L/100 km; 24.2 mpg_{‑US}) |
| Evora GT410 Sport | 416 PS (306 kW; 410 hp) at 7,000 rpm | 440 N⋅m (325 lb⋅ft) at 4,500 rpm | 234 g/km | 190 mph (306 km/h) | 3.9 seconds | 29.1 mpg_{‑imp} (9.7 L/100 km; 24.2 mpg_{‑US}) |
| Evora GT410 Sport IPS | 416 PS (306 kW; 410 hp) at 7,000 rpm | 450 N⋅m (332 lb⋅ft) at 4,500 rpm | 234 g/km | 174 mph (280 km/h) | 4.0 seconds | 29.1 mpg_{‑imp} (9.7 L/100 km; 24.2 mpg_{‑US}) |
| Evora GT | 422 PS (310 kW; 416 hp) at 7,000 rpm | 430 N⋅m (317 lb⋅ft) at 3,500 rpm | 274 g/km | 188 mph (303 km/h) | 3.8 seconds | 26 mpg_{‑imp} (11 L/100 km; 22 mpg_{‑US}) |
| Evora GT IPS | 422 PS (310 kW; 416 hp) at 7,000 rpm | 450 N⋅m (332 lb⋅ft) at 4,500 rpm | 273 g/km | 174 mph (280 km/h) | 3.8 seconds | 24 mpg_{‑imp} (12 L/100 km; 20 mpg_{‑US}) |
| Evora GT430 Sport | 436 PS (321 kW; 430 hp) at 7,000 rpm | 440 N⋅m (325 lb⋅ft) at 4,500 rpm | 234 g/km | 196 mph (315 km/h) | 3.7 seconds | 29.1 mpg_{‑imp} (9.7 L/100 km; 24.2 mpg_{‑US}) |
| Evora GT430 Sport IPS | 436 PS (321 kW; 430 hp) at 7,000 rpm | 450 N⋅m (332 lb⋅ft) at 4,500 rpm | 234 g/km | 174 mph (280 km/h) | 3.6 seconds | 29.1 mpg_{‑imp} (9.7 L/100 km; 24.2 mpg_{‑US}) |

== Special editions ==
=== Evora 414E Hybrid ===
In 2012, Lotus produced a prototype hybrid Evora, called 414E. Developed as a demonstration project for the UK Government's Technology Strategy Board, the range-extended electric coupe emits 55 g/km CO_{2} and has an electric only driving range of 30 miles. When combined with the 3-cylinder 1.2-litre (1198 cc) petrol engine acting as a generator (as a similar manner to the Chevrolet Volt), the 414E has a range of 300 miles. The 414E formed the basis of the Infiniti Emerg-e concept car.

=== Evora S Carabinieri ===
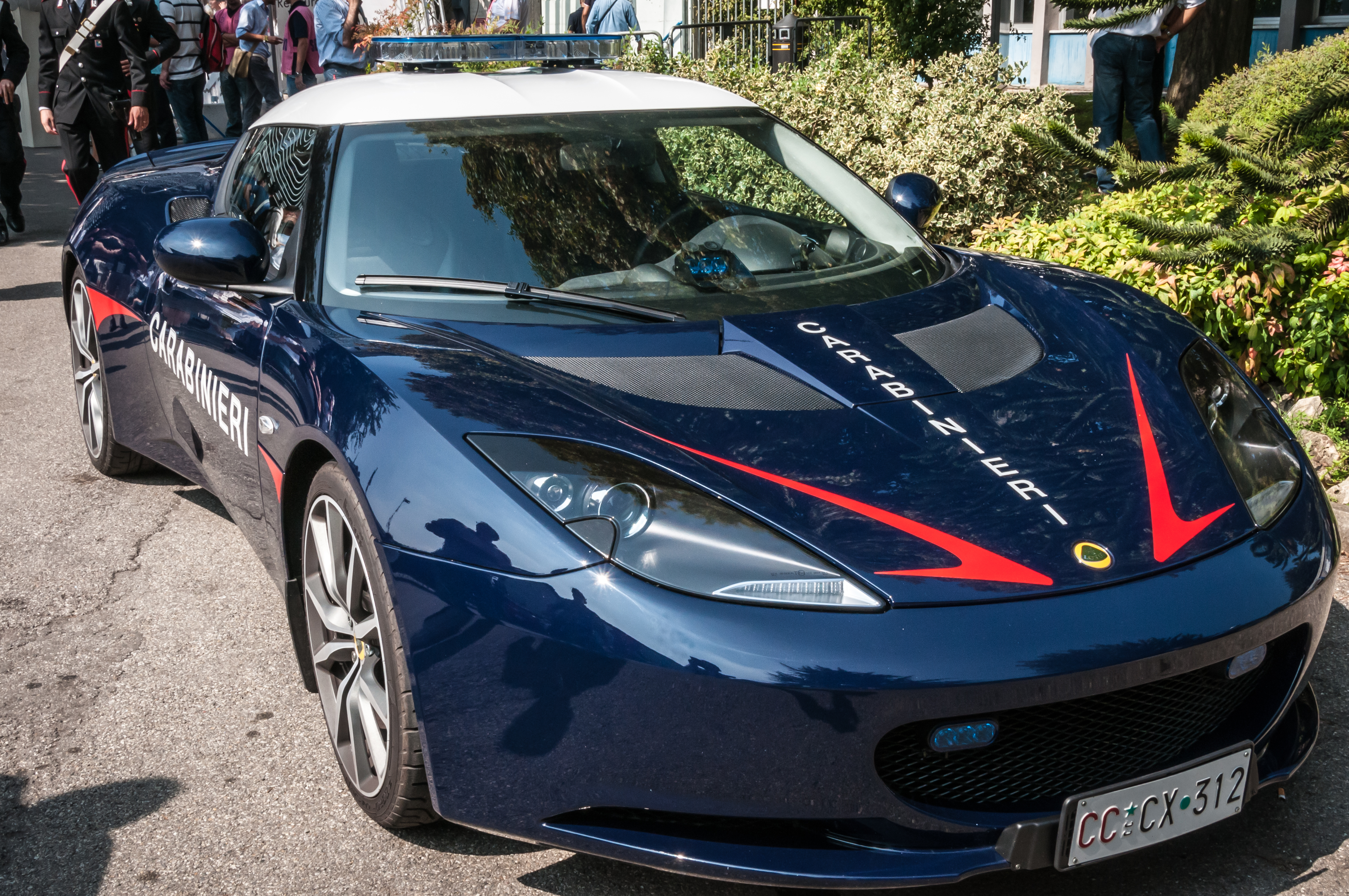
Lotus Evora S Carabinieri

In July 2011, Lotus Cars donated two Evora S models with special equipment to the Carabinieri, the Italian gendarmerie. Lotus also pledged to handle the maintenance of the cars and the training for the drivers.

=== Evora GTE Road Car ===
The Evora GTE road version is a variant of the Evora that was built to permit its racing variant to race under GT3 and LM GTE regulations. Only 25 units of this special edition were built. The road car uses the race car's engine and produces 438 hp (327 kW; 444 PS), making it the most powerful Lotus ever made. The weight of the car has been lowered drastically to 1,277 kg (2,815 lb).

== Motorsport ==
=== LM GTE ===
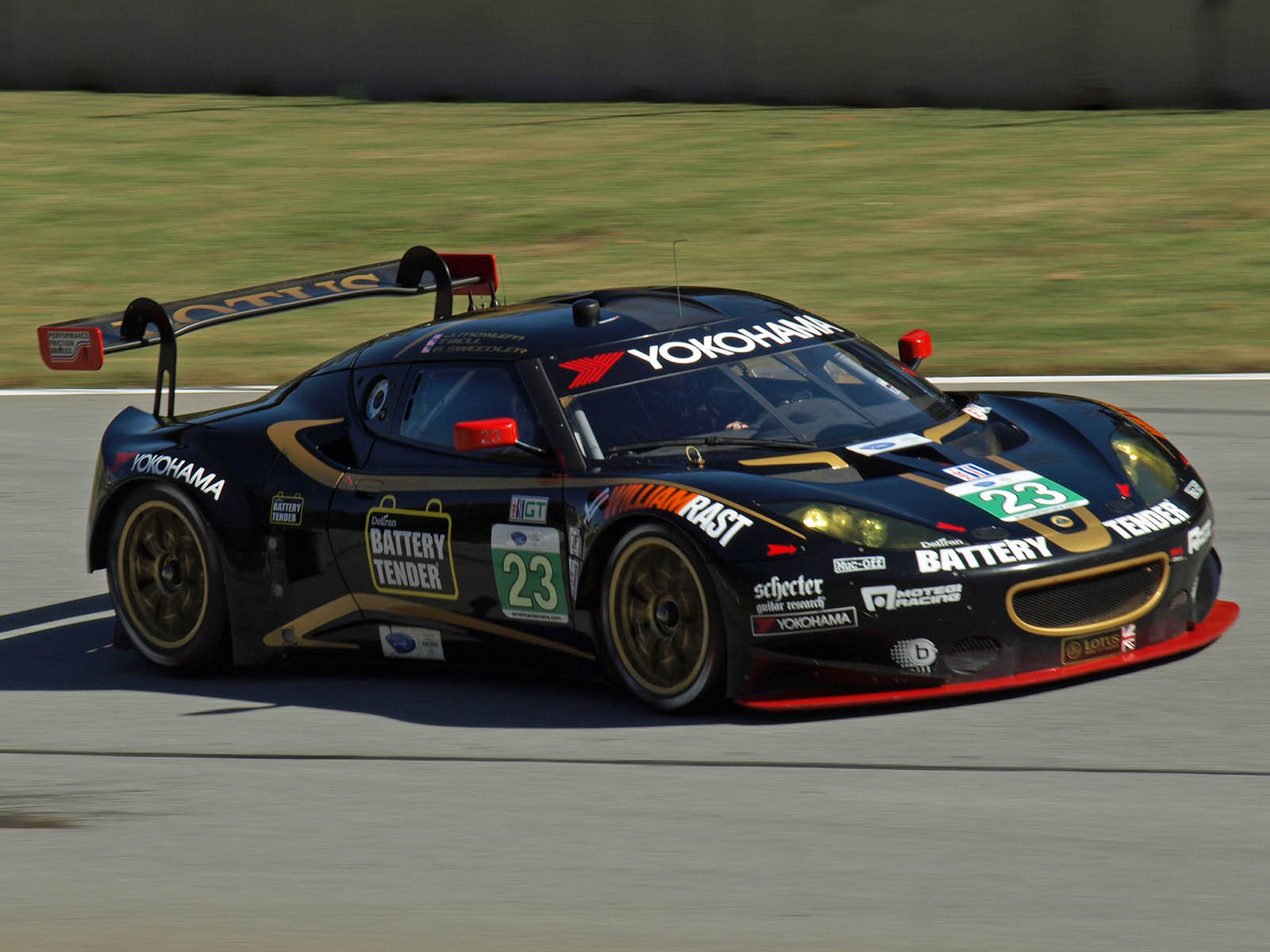
Townsend Bell in an Evora GTE during 2012 Petit Le Mans

During the 2011 Geneva Motor Show, Lotus announced the Evora Enduro GT concept, as a follow-up to the Type 124 and GT4 race cars. Lotus was aiming for this car to enter into the LM GTE category by mid-2011, with a 444 hp (331 kW; 450 PS) Toyota-supplied V8.

Lotus entered two Evoras at the 2011 24 Hours of Le Mans, which were run by the Jetalliance Racing team. Despite overheating issues during practice and qualifying, car No. 65 finished 22nd overall, completing 295 laps, whilst car No. 64 retired after 126 laps. The cars ran highly tuned, naturally aspirated variants of its factory V6 engine, instead of the aforementioned V8.

In 2012, Jetalliance Racing failed to negotiate a deal to run the cars in Europe; instead, Alex Job Racing chose to run a LM GTE in the American Le Mans Series. Alex Job Racing did not get a good outcome from this however, and the car was later replaced by a Ferrari 458 Italia GT2 as the main race car for the team.

=== Group GT4 ===
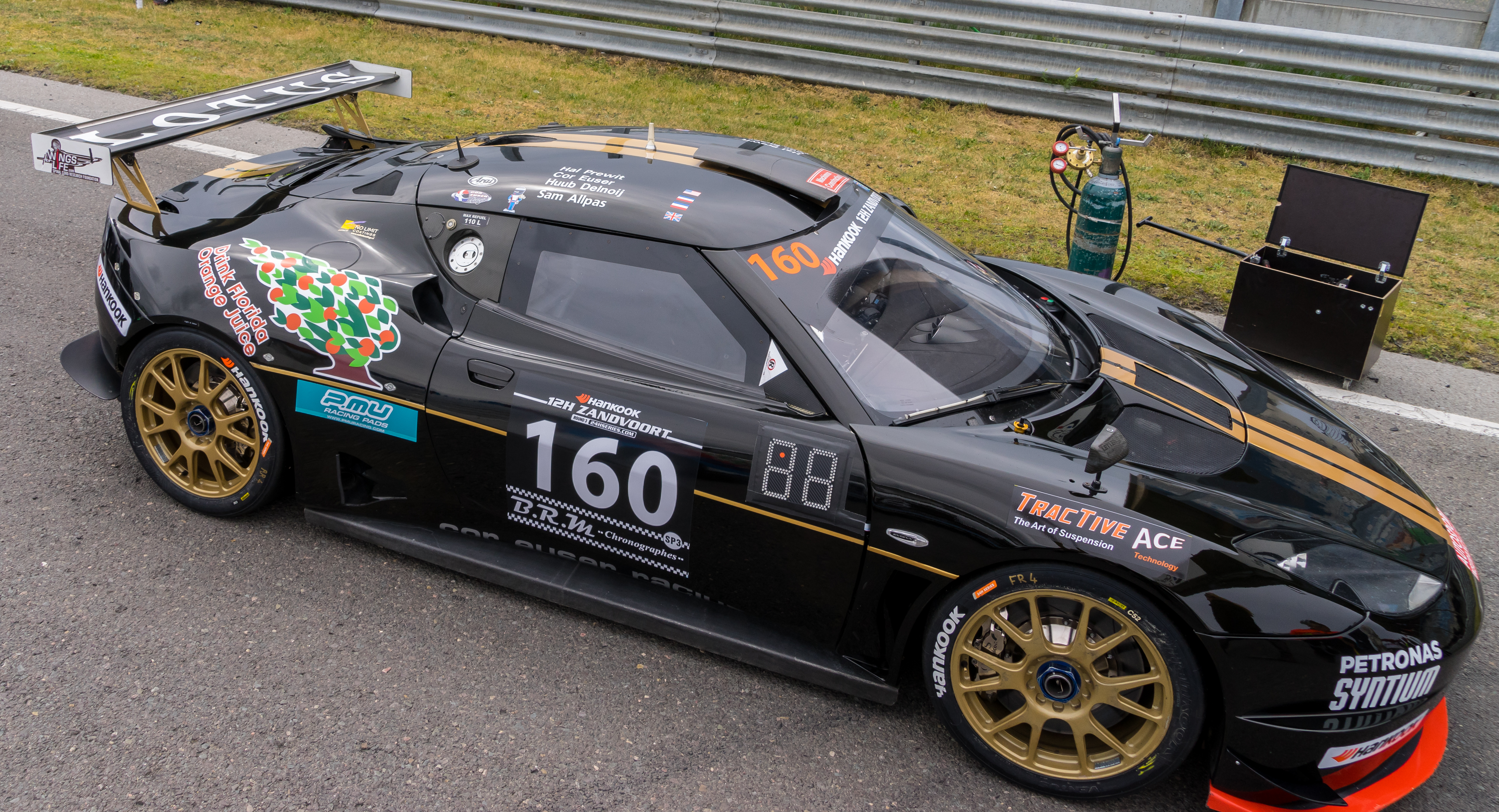
Cor Euser Racing Lotus Evora GT4 at the 2015 12 Hours of Zandvoort

Ollie Hancock won the Nürburgring round of the 2010 GT4 European Cup season. A team including Johnny Mowlem, Stefano D'Aste and Gianni Giudici finished on the podium in the 2011 Dubai 24 Hour endurance race.

In 2011, Stefano D'Aste was the first Italian driver after Mario Andretti to win on Circuit Park Zandvoort with an official Lotus car and the car was the Evora GT4. D'Aste was in first position of the GT4 European Series till the last race but due to a problem that occurred to the engine he got a third position in the series, which was still good, considering that it was the first year that the official Lotus Evora GT4 took part to a full season competing with cars like the BMW M3, Porsche 911, Aston Martin Vantage GT4, and the Chevrolet Camaro. The Evora proved capable of keeping up with these cars.

In 2012, Richard Adams, David Green and Martin Byford won the Britcar MSA British Endurance Championship in a Lotus Evora GT4.

=== GT300 ===
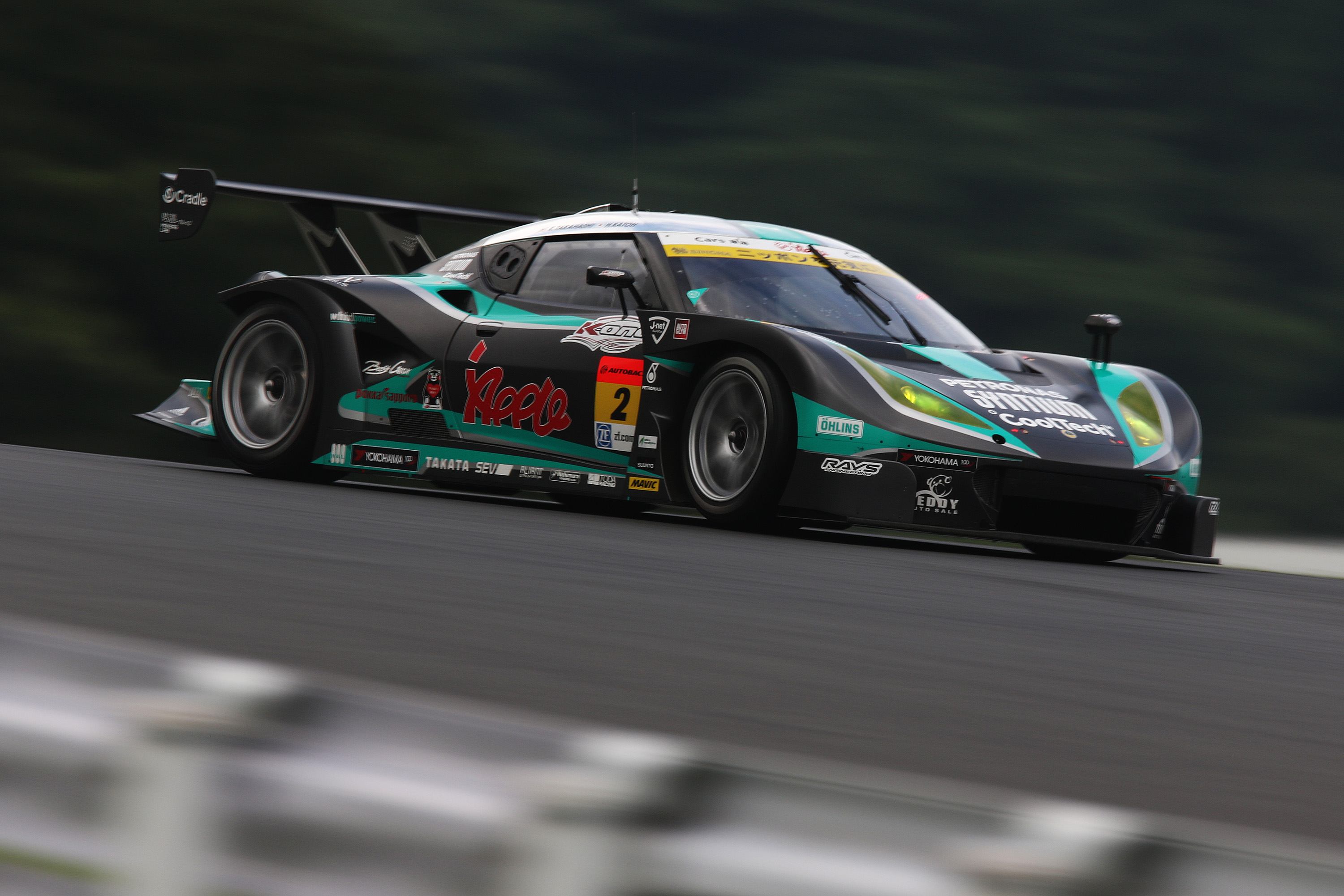
Cars Tokai Dream28 Lotus Evora GT300 at Fuji Speedway

Cars Tokai ran a Lotus Evora from 2015 to 2021 in the GT300 class of Super GT, with backing from Lotus Cars Japan. Engineered by Mooncraft, the Evora GT300 MC was built to the series' "Mother Chassis" regulations, and as such, was a silhouette racing car sharing almost no parts with its production counterpart. As with all other Mother Chassis cars, it was built on a Dome chassis and powered by a Nissan VK45DE naturally aspirated V8. The Evora took its maiden victory at Fuji Speedway in 2020, followed by its second and last win at Twin Ring Motegi in 2021.

== Reception ==
The Evora received several accolades at its launch from the British motoring press, including: Britain's Best Driver's Car 2009 from Autocar and Car of the Year 2009, from Evo.

The car was reviewed by Jeremy Clarkson on the television show Top Gear. Overall his review was positive: he was very happy with the performance, handling and comfort. He was extremely impressed with the ride comfort even after driving it into a field saying "Here, the suspension is taking the knocks, not me." and described the car as "the only car I've ever driven, ever, which is a killer attack dog and an old sofa". However, he considered the rear seats to have not enough legroom, the interior felt "tinny" and the satellite navigation was sub-optimal.

Road & Track put the Evora in #2 place in their annual "Performance Car of the Year" contest in 2017, noting the Evora is "fully deserving of the ACBC badge on its nose, this brave and charming two-plus-two is perhaps the finest over-the-road enthusiast vehicle available for sale at any price."
