= 2017 Britcar Endurance Championship =

The 2017 Dunlop Endurance Championship was a motor racing championship for GT cars, touring cars and sports cars held at circuits across England. The championship featured a variety of cars, ranging from production-based vehicles to GT and sports cars, competing in five classes across two categories based on factors such as engine power and performance. It was the 15th season of a Britcar championship. The championship featured separate Sprint and Endurance categories, with Sprint races lasting 50 minutes and Endurance races lasting 120 minutes. Although E Class and S Class cars competed in the same race, separate results were recorded for the Sprint and Endurance categories. The season began on 14 April at Rockingham and ended on 18 November at Brands Hatch.

== Calendar ==
Round	Circuit	Length	Date
1	(United Kingdom) Silverstone International, Northamptonshire	50 min	9 April
1	(United Kingdom) Silverstone International, Northamptonshire	50 min/120 min (Note: The Sprint category drivers race for 50 minutes in race two, the Endurance category for 120 minutes.)	9 April
2	(United Kingdom) Snetterton 300, Norfolk	50 min	6 May
2	(United Kingdom) Snetterton 300, Norfolk	50 min/120 min	6 May
3	(United Kingdom) Silverstone GP, Northamptonshire	50 min	26 June
3	(United Kingdom) Silverstone GP, Northamptonshire	50 min/120 min	26 June
4	(United Kingdom) Brands Hatch Indy Circuit, Kent	50 min	29 July
4	(United Kingdom) Brands Hatch Indy Circuit, Kent	50 min/120 min	29 July
5	(United Kingdom) Donington National, Leicestershire	50 min	2 September
5	(United Kingdom) Donington National, Leicestershire	50 min/120 min	2 September
6	(United Kingdom) Oulton Park International, Cheshire	50 min	21 October
6	(United Kingdom) Oulton Park International, Cheshire	50 min/120 min	21 October
7	(United Kingdom) Silverstone National, Northamptonshire	50 min/120 min (Note: The race started late and ran too long into the night for a second race, so was run in the second race format.)	5 November
8	(United Kingdom) Brands Hatch Indy Circuit, Kent	25 min (Note: Tom Barley crashed out in the race earlier, bringing out the red flag and a complete restart of the race, from lap 0.)	17–18 November
8	(United Kingdom) Brands Hatch Indy Circuit, Kent	50 min/120 min	17–18 November

== Teams and drivers ==
Class 1 Endurance
Team	Car	No.	Drivers	Rounds
Neil Garner Motorsport	Mosler MT900R	3	(Spain) Manuel Cintrano	1, 3, 5, 8
Neil Garner Motorsport	Mosler MT900R	3	(Spain) Javier Morcillo	1, 3, 5, 8
FF Corse	Ferrari 458 GT3	7	(United Kingdom) David Mason	1-2
FF Corse	Ferrari 458 GT3	7	(United Kingdom) Calum Lockie	1-2
MacG Racing	Taranis	8	(United Kingdom) Jonny MacGregor	3
MacG Racing	Taranis	8	(United Kingdom) Ben Sharich	3
HUD Motorsport	Aston Martin Vantage GT3	12	(United Kingdom) Nigel Hudson	1-2
HUD Motorsport	Aston Martin Vantage GT3	12	(United Kingdom) Adam Wilcox	1-2
MJC Furlonger	Ferrari 458 GTE	43	(United Kingdom) Witt Gamski	All
MJC Furlonger	Ferrari 458 GTE	43	(Scotland) Ross Wylie	1-3, 5–8
MJC Furlonger	Ferrari 458 GTE	43	(United Kingdom) Joe Macari	4
RAW Motorsport	Radial RXC GT3	96	(United Kingdom) Rob Wheldon	6-8
RAW Motorsport	Radial RXC GT3	96	(United Kingdom) Stefano Leaney	6-8
Class 1 Endurance Invitation
MacG Racing	Taranis (Note: Despite being a regular car eligible for points, MacGregor entered originally as an invitation car, so raced in his normal car after the Arrinera failed.)	8	(United Kingdom) Jonny MacGregor	5
Class 2 Endurance
FF Corse	Ferrari 458 Challenge	4	(United Kingdom) Leyton Clarke	1-3
FF Corse	Ferrari 458 Challenge	4	(United Kingdom) Graham Lucking	1-3
FF Corse	Ferrari 458 Challenge	5	(Wales) Bonamy Grimes	1-6, 8
FF Corse	Ferrari 458 Challenge	5	(United Kingdom) Johnny Mowlem	1-4, 6, 8
FF Corse	Ferrari 458 Challenge	5	(United Kingdom) Charlie Hollings	5
FF Corse	Ferrari 458 Challenge	9	(United Kingdom) Mike Wilds	1-2
FF Corse	Ferrari 458 Challenge	9	(United Kingdom) Dino Zamparelli	1-2
FF Corse	Ferrari 458 Challenge	22	(Belgium) Laurent De Meeus	1
FF Corse	Ferrari 458 Challenge	22	(United Kingdom) Jamie Stanley	1
FF Corse	Ferrari 458 Challenge	23	(United Kingdom) Marc Brough	1
FF Corse	Ferrari 458 Challenge	23	(United Kingdom) Charlie Hollings	1
Moss Motorsport	BMW 1M E82	18	(United Kingdom) Mike Moss	1-2
Moss Motorsport	BMW 1M E82	18	(United Kingdom) Jonathan Evans	1
Moss Motorsport	BMW 1M E82	18	(United Kingdom) Scott Adam	2
Class 3 Endurance
EDF Motorsport	Aston Martin Vantage GT4	10	(Australia) Mal Sandford	7-8
EDF Motorsport	Aston Martin Vantage GT4	10	(United Kingdom) Ben Seyfried	7-8
Team HARD Racing	Ginetta G55 GT4	11	(United Kingdom) Toby Bearne	1-2
Team HARD Racing	Ginetta G55 GT4	11	(United Kingdom) Daniel Wylie	1-2
Team HARD Racing	Ginetta G55 GT4	24	(United Kingdom) Simon Rudd	All
Team HARD Racing	Ginetta G55 GT4	24	(United Kingdom) Tom Barley	1-2, 4–6, 8
Team HARD Racing	Ginetta G55 GT4	24	(United Kingdom) Will Philips	3
Team HARD Racing	Ginetta G55 GT4	24	(United Kingdom) Adam Hatfield	7
Team HARD Racing	Ginetta G55 GT4	33	(United Kingdom) Angus Dudley	All
Team HARD Racing	Ginetta G55 GT4	33	(United Kingdom) Callum Hawkins-Row	All
Team HARD Racing	Ginetta G55 GT4	285	(United Kingdom) Darron Lewis	All
Team HARD Racing	Ginetta G55 GT4	285	(United Kingdom) Tom Knight	1-5, 7–8
Team HARD Racing	Ginetta G55 GT4	285	(United Kingdom) Adam Shepherd	6
Moss Motorsport	BMW 1M E82	18	(United Kingdom) Mike Moss	3-6, 8
Moss Motorsport	BMW 1M E82	18	(United Kingdom) Scott Adam	3-6
Moss Motorsport	BMW 1M E82	18	(United Kingdom) Kevin Clarke	8
SG Racing	Porsche 997 Cup	32	(United Kingdom) Mark Cunningham	1-6
SG Racing	Porsche 997 Cup	32	(United Kingdom) Peter Cunningham	1-6
SG Racing	Porsche 997 Cup	32	(United Kingdom) Frank Bradley	3
Whitebridge Motorsport	Aston Martin Vantage GT4	72	(United Kingdom) Chris Murphy	All
Whitebridge Motorsport	Aston Martin Vantage GT4	72	(United Kingdom) Dean Gibbs	1-2
Whitebridge Motorsport	Aston Martin Vantage GT4	72	(United Kingdom) Matty George	3-5, 7–8
Whitebridge Motorsport	Aston Martin Vantage GT4	72	(United Kingdom) Phil Glew	6
WDC Racing	Porsche 997 Cup	88	(United Kingdom) Neil Garnham	1
WDC Racing	Porsche 997 Cup	88	(United Kingdom) Rob Young	1
OCC Lasik Newbridge Motorsport	Porsche Cayman Clubsport	249	(Canada) Fareed Ali	3
OCC Lasik Newbridge Motorsport	Porsche Cayman Clubsport	249	(United Kingdom) Chris Valentine	3
OCC Lasik Newbridge Motorsport	Porsche Cayman Clubsport	249	(Latvia) Gleb Stepanovs	4-5, 8
OCC Lasik Newbridge Motorsport	Porsche Cayman Clubsport	249	(United Kingdom) Steve Tomkins	4, 8
OCC Lasik Newbridge Motorsport	Porsche Cayman Clubsport	249	(United Kingdom) Lee Goble	5
Class 3 Endurance Invitation
WDC Racing	McLaren 570 GT4	14	(United Kingdom) Neil Garnham	8
WDC Racing	McLaren 570 GT4	14	(United Kingdom) Matt Le Breton	8
WDC Racing	McLaren 570 GT4	14	(United Kingdom) Rob Young	8
Black Mamba Racing	Ginetta G55 GT4	22	(South Africa) Jayde Kruger	5-6, 8
Black Mamba Racing	Ginetta G55 GT4	22	(United Kingdom) Chris Papageorgiou	5-6
Black Mamba Racing	Ginetta G55 GT4	22	(United Kingdom) Andreas Demetriou	8
Orbital Sound Ltd	Lotus Exige	55	(United Kingdom) Chris Headlam	3
Orbital Sound Ltd	Lotus Exige	55	(United Kingdom) Jamie Stanley	3
Track Focused	KTM X-Bow GT4	262	(United Kingdom) Mike McCollum	5-6
Track Focused	KTM X-Bow GT4	262	(United Kingdom) Sean Cooper	5-6
Beechdean Motorsport	Aston Martin Vantage GT4	407	(United Kingdom) Paul Hollywood	3
Beechdean Motorsport	Aston Martin Vantage GT4	407	(United Kingdom) Andrew Howard	3
Class 4 Endurance
Cuda Drinks	Ginetta G50	14	(United Kingdom) Richard Burrows	3-4
Cuda Drinks	Ginetta G50	14	(United Kingdom) Patrick Watts	3-4
Eureka Motorsport	BMW M3 E46	28	(United Kingdom) Rob Hudson	1-2, 4–5
Eureka Motorsport	BMW M3 E46	28	(Brazil) Adriano Medeiros	1-2, 4–5
Concept 3 Racing	BMW M3 E46	38	(United Kingdom) Sam Allpass	1, 3, 8
Concept 3 Racing	BMW M3 E46	38	(United Kingdom) Clint Bardwell	1, 8
Concept 3 Racing	BMW M3 E46	38	(United Kingdom) Jamie Martin	3
Moss Motorsport	BMW M3 E46	57	(United Kingdom) Jon Watt	1
Moss Motorsport	BMW M3 E46	57	(United Kingdom) Simon Baker	1
Class 4 Endurance Invitation
Maximum Group	SEAT Cupra TCR	95	(United Kingdom) Stewart Lines	3, 8
Maximum Group	SEAT Cupra TCR	95	(United Kingdom) Ollie Taylor	8
Class 5 Endurance
Woodard Motorsport	Mini JCW R56	49	(United Kingdom) Daniel Woodard	1-2
Woodard Motorsport	Mini JCW R56	49	(United Kingdom) David Birrell	1-2
Synchro Motorsport	Honda Civic Type R	76	(Wales) Alyn James	2-4
Synchro Motorsport	Honda Civic Type R	76	(United Kingdom) Dan Wheeler	2-3
Synchro Motorsport	Honda Civic Type R	76	(United Kingdom) Martin Byford	4
Track Focused/Track Toys Racing	Volkswagen Golf	91	(United Kingdom) Danny Russel	3
Track Focused/Track Toys Racing	Volkswagen Golf	91	(United Kingdom) Simon Garrad	3
Advanced Motorsport	Alfa Romeo 156 T	157	(Republic of Ireland) Barry McMahon	3
Class 5 Endurance Invitation
Willmott Racing/Merlin International	BMW M3 E36	22	(United Kingdom) Colin Wiillmott	5
Willmott Racing/Merlin International	BMW M3 E36	22	(United Kingdom) James Crabtree	5
Class 1 Sprint
FF Corse	Ferrari 458 GT3	7	(United Kingdom) David Mason	3-5, 7–8
FF Corse	Ferrari 458 GT3	7	(United Kingdom) Calum Lockie	3-5, 7–8
Team ABBA Racing	Mercedes AMG GT3	8	(United Kingdom) Richard Neary	7
National Motorsport Academy	Mosler MT900R	27	(United Kingdom) Kevin Riley	1
Class 1 Sprint Invitation
MacG Racing	Arrinera Hussarya (Note: The Arrinera was due to race in round five but an engine failure prevented the car from competing.)	8	(United Kingdom) Jonny MacGregor	5
Class 2 Sprint
FF Corse	Ferrari 488 Challenge	22	(Belgium) Laurent De Meeus	2
FF Corse	Ferrari 488 Challenge	22	(United Kingdom) Jamie Stanley	2
FF Corse	Ferrari 488 Challenge	23	(United Kingdom) Marc Brough	2
FF Corse	Ferrari 488 Challenge	23	(United Kingdom) Andrew Bentley	2
WDC Racing	Ferrari 458 Challenge	71	(United Kingdom) Neil Garnham	8
WDC Racing	Ferrari 458 Challenge	71	(United Kingdom) Matt Le Breton	8
WDC Racing	Ferrari 458 Challenge	71	(United Kingdom) Rob Young	8
Class 3 Sprint
WDC Racing	BMW M3 E92	6	(United Kingdom) Neil Garnham	1
WDC Racing	BMW M3 E92	6	(United Kingdom) Rob Young	1
Track Focused	Porsche Cayman	17	(United Kingdom) Rick Nevinson	1-3, 6–7
Track Focused	Porsche Cayman	17	(United Kingdom) Sean Cooper	1, 3–4, 7–8
Track Focused	Porsche Cayman	17	(United Kingdom) Matt Cherrington	2
Track Focused	Porsche Cayman	17	(United Kingdom) Marcus Clutton	5
Track Focused	Porsche Cayman	17	(United Kingdom) Brad Nevinson	6, 8
FF Corse	Ferrari 360 Challenge	26	(United Kingdom) Robert MacFarlane	3
Fox Motorsport	Porsche Cayman	48	(United Kingdom) Mark Murfitt	3
Fox Motorsport	Porsche Cayman	48	(United Kingdom) Michael Broadhurst	3
Bespoke cars	Porsche 997 Cup	69	(United Kingdom) Marcus Fothergill	1, 4–8
Bespoke cars	Porsche 997 Cup	69	(New Zealand) Dave Benett	1, 4–8
Bespoke cars	Porsche 997 Cup	69	(United Kingdom) Craig Davies	7
Class 3 Sprint Invitation
Moss Motorsport	BMW 1M E82	18	(United Kingdom) Mike Moss	7
ALP Racing	Saker RAPX	23	(United Kingdom) Alan Purbrick	5
ALP Racing	Saker RAPX	23	(United Kingdom) David Brise	5
Willmott Racing/Merlin International	Porsche 997 Cup	70	(United Kingdom) Colin Wiillmott	3
Willmott Racing/Merlin International	Porsche 997 Cup	70	(United Kingdom) Oliver Wiillmott	3, 5–6
Willmott Racing/Merlin International	Porsche 997 Cup	70	(United Kingdom) Katie Milner	5-6
WPI Motorsport	Porsche 997 Cup	98	(United Kingdom) Michael Igoe	6
WPI Motorsport	Porsche 997 Cup	98	(United Kingdom) Adam Wilcox	6
Class 4 Sprint
WDC Racing	BMW M3 E92	6	(United Kingdom) Neil Garnham	3
WDC Racing	BMW M3 E92	6	(United Kingdom) Rob Young	3
Tockwith Motorsport	Ginetta G50	15	(United Kingdom) Edward Moore	All
Tockwith Motorsport	Ginetta G50	15	(United Kingdom) Marmaduke Hall	3-8
Moss Motorsport	BMW M3 E46	57	(United Kingdom) Simon Baker	4, 6
Moss Motorsport	BMW M3 E46	57	(Wales) Kristian Prosser	4-6
Moss Motorsport	BMW M3 E46	57	(United Kingdom) Frank Bradley	5
Moss Motorsport	BMW M3 E46	57	(United Kingdom) Ed Platt	7
Moss Motorsport	BMW M3 E46	57	(United Kingdom) Ashley Bird	7
Moss Motorsport	BMW M3 E46	57	(United Kingdom) Tom Howard	8
Moss Motorsport	BMW M3 E46	57	(United Kingdom) Adam Hayes	8
Simon Baker	BMW M3 E36	61	(United Kingdom) Simon Baker	3
Paul Calladine Motorsport	Ginetta G50	92	(United Kingdom) Paul Calladine	1
Maximum Group	SEAT Cupra TCR	95	(United Kingdom) Tom Walker	6
Maximum Group	SEAT Cupra TCR	95	(United Kingdom) Ollie Taylor	6
Andy Wilson	Holden Monaro	97	(United Kingdom) Andy Wilson	6
Andy Wilson	Holden Monaro	97	(United Kingdom) Peter Snowdon	6
Class 4 Sprint Invitation
Tockwith Motorsport	Ginetta G50	25	(United Kingdom) Simon Moore	6-7
Tockwith Motorsport	Ginetta G50	25	(United Kingdom) Rob Hedley	6
Tockwith Motorsport	Ginetta G50	25	(United Kingdom) Lucas Nannetti	7-8
Tockwith Motorsport	Ginetta G50	25	(United Kingdom) Jacob Jackson	8
Geoff Steel Racing	BMW M3 GTR	38	(United Kingdom) Sam Allpass	5
Team HARD Racing	Toyota Avensis	49	(United Kingdom) Adam Hatfield	6
Team HARD Racing	Toyota Avensis	49	(United Kingdom) Ben Wallace	8
Team HARD Racing	Toyota Avensis	49	(United Kingdom) Jesse Chamberlain	8
Barwell Motorsport	Audi RS3 TCR	78	(United Kingdom) Sam De Haan	8
Class 5 Sprint
HSG Sport	Ford Focus	41	(United Kingdom) Richard Woods	4-6
HSG Sport	Ford Focus	41	(United Kingdom) Mark Wakefield	4-6
S2Smarts	Smart ForFour	52	(United Kingdom) Rob Baker	1, 4–8
S2Smarts	Smart ForFour	52	(United Kingdom) Jonathan Swan	1
S2Smarts	Smart ForFour	52	(United Kingdom) Sarah Moore	6-8
Reflex Racing	Ginetta G40	58	(United Kingdom) Marcus Vivian	1, 3
Reflex Racing	Ginetta G40	58	(United Kingdom) Derek Holden	1, 3
Synchro Motorsport	Honda Civic Type R	76	(Wales) Alyn James	8
Synchro Motorsport	Honda Civic Type R	76	(United Kingdom) Martin Byford	8
RM Racing	Volkswagen Golf	80	(United Kingdom) Roland Hopkins	1, 3–8
RM Racing	Volkswagen Golf	80	(United Kingdom) Matt Sleigh	1, 3–5
RM Racing	Volkswagen Golf	80	(United Kingdom) Matthew Boyce	6-8
Class 5 Sprint Invitation
Team HARD Racing	Volkswagen Passat	49	(United Kingdom) Adam Hatfield	5
Advanced Motorsport	Alfa Romeo 156 T	157	(Republic of Ireland) Barry McMahon	5, 7

== Results ==
Round		Circuit	Pole position	Fastest lap	Overall winner	Winning Team	Winning E1	Winning E2	Winning E3	Winning E4	Winning E5	Winning S1	Winning S2	Winning S3	Winning S4	Winning S5
1	R1	Silverstone International	(Spain) Manuel Cintrano (Spain) Javier Morcillo	(Spain) Manuel Cintrano (Spain) Javier Morcillo	(United Kingdom) Mike Wilds (United Kingdom) Dino Zamparelli	No. 9 FF Corse	(Spain) Manuel Cintrano (Spain) Javier Morcillo	(United Kingdom) Mike Wilds (United Kingdom) Dino Zamparelli	(United Kingdom) Marc Brough (United Kingdom) Charlie Hollings	(United Kingdom) Sam Allpass (United Kingdom) Clint Bardwell	(United Kingdom) Daniel Woodard (United Kingdom) David Birrell	(United Kingdom) Kevin Riley	None	(United Kingdom) Neil Garnham (United Kingdom) Rob Young	(United Kingdom) Edward Moore	(United Kingdom) Marcos Vivian (United Kingdom) Derek Holden
1	R2	Silverstone International		(United Kingdom) Edward Moore (S) (Spain) Manuel Cintrano (Spain) Javier Morcillo (E)	(United Kingdom) Edward Moore (S) (Wales) Bonamy Grimes (United Kingdom) Johnny Mowlem (E)	No. 15 Tockwith Motorsport (S) No. 5 FF Corse(E)	(United Kingdom) Nigel Hudson (United Kingdom) Adam Wilcox	(Wales) Bonamy Grimes (United Kingdom) Johnny Mowlem	(United Kingdom) Simon Rudd (United Kingdom) Tom Barley	(United Kingdom) Sam Allpass (United Kingdom) Clint Bardwell	(United Kingdom) Daniel Woodard (United Kingdom) David Birrell	(United Kingdom) Kevin Riley	None	(United Kingdom) Rick Nevison (United Kingdom) Sean Cooper	(United Kingdom) Edward Moore	(United Kingdom) Rob Baker (United Kingdom) Jonathan Swan
2	R3	Snetterton 300	(United Kingdom) Witt Gamski (Scotland) Ross Wylie	(United Kingdom) Witt Gamski (Scotland) Ross Wylie	(United Kingdom) Nigel Hudson (United Kingdom) Adam Wilcox	No. 12 HUD Motorsport	(United Kingdom) Nigel Hudson (United Kingdom) Adam Wilcox	(Wales) Bonamy Grimes (United Kingdom) Johnny Mowlem	(United Kingdom) Simon Rudd (United Kingdom) Tom Barley	(United Kingdom) Rob Hudson (Brazil) Adriano Medeiros	(Wales) Alyn James (United Kingdom) Dan Wheeler	(United Kingdom) David Mason (United Kingdom) Calum Lockie	(United Kingdom) Marc Brough (United Kingdom) Andrew Bentley	(United Kingdom) Rick Nevison (United Kingdom) Matt Cherrington	(United Kingdom) Edward Moore	None
2	R4	Snetterton 300		(United Kingdom) David Mason (United Kingdom) Calum Lockie (S) (United Kingdom) Witt Gamski (Scotland) Ross Wylie (E)	(Belgium) Laurent De Meeus (United Kingdom) Jamie Stanley (S) (United Kingdom) Witt Gamski (Scotland) Ross Wylie (E)	No. 22 FF Corse (S) No. 43 MJC Furlonger (E)	(United Kingdom) Witt Gamski (Scotland) Ross Wylie	(Wales) Bonamy Grimes (United Kingdom) Johnny Mowlem	(United Kingdom) Simon Rudd (United Kingdom) Tom Barley	(United Kingdom) Rob Hudson (Brazil) Adriano Medeiros	(Wales) Alyn James (United Kingdom) Daniel Wheeler	(United Kingdom) David Mason (United Kingdom) Calum Lockie	(Belgium) Laurent De Meeus (United Kingdom) Jamie Stanley	(United Kingdom) Rick Nevison (United Kingdom) Matt Cherrington	(United Kingdom) Edward Moore	None
3	R5	Silverstone GP	(United Kingdom) Witt Gamski (Scotland) Ross Wylie	(United Kingdom) Witt Gamski (Scotland) Ross Wylie	(United Kingdom) Witt Gamski (Scotland) Ross Wylie	No. 43 MJC Furlonger	(United Kingdom) Witt Gamski (Scotland) Ross Wylie	(Wales) Bonamy Grimes (United Kingdom) Johnny Mowlem	(United Kingdom) Angus Dudley (United Kingdom) Callum Hawkins-Row	(United Kingdom) Sam Allpass (United Kingdom) Jamie Martin	(Republic of Ireland) Barry McMahon	(United Kingdom) David Mason (United Kingdom) Calum Lockie	None	(United Kingdom) Mark Murfitt (United Kingdom) Michael Broadhurst	(United Kingdom) Neil Garnham (United Kingdom) Rob Young	(United Kingdom) Marcus Vivian (United Kingdom) Derek Holden
3	R6	Silverstone GP		(United Kingdom) David Mason (United Kingdom) Calum Lockie (S) (E)	(United Kingdom) David Mason (United Kingdom) Calum Lockie (S) (E)	No. 7 FF Corse (S) (E)	(United Kingdom) Witt Gamski (Scotland) Ross Wylie	(United Kingdom) Graham Lucking (United Kingdom) Leyton Clarke	(United Kingdom) Angus Dudley (United Kingdom) Callum Hawkins-Row	(United Kingdom) Sam Allpass (United Kingdom) Jamie Martin	(Wales) Alyn James (United Kingdom) Daniel Wheeler	(United Kingdom) David Mason (United Kingdom) Calum Lockie	None	(United Kingdom) Colin Willmott (United Kingdom) Oliver Willmott	(United Kingdom) Stewart Lines	(United Kingdom) Roland Hopkins (United Kingdom) Matt Sleigh
4	R7	Brands Hatch Indy Circuit	(United Kingdom) David Mason (United Kingdom) Calum Lockie	(United Kingdom) David Mason (United Kingdom) Calum Lockie	(Wales) Bonamy Grimes (United Kingdom) Johnny Mowlem	No. 5 FF Corse	(United Kingdom) Witt Gamski (United Kingdom) Joe Macari	(Wales) Bonamy Grimes (United Kingdom) Johnny Mowlem	(United Kingdom) Darren Lewis (United Kingdom) Tom Knight	(United Kingdom) Rob Hudson (Brazil) Adriano Medeiros	(Wales) Alyn James (United Kingdom) Martin Byford	(United Kingdom) David Mason (United Kingdom) Calum Lockie	None	(United Kingdom) Marcus Fothergill (New Zealand) Dave Benett	(United Kingdom) Edward Moore (United Kingdom) Marmaduke Hall	(United Kingdom) Richard Woods (United Kingdom) Mark Wakefield
4	R8	Brands Hatch Indy Circuit		(United Kingdom) Edward Moore (United Kingdom) Marmaduke Hall (S) (E)	(United Kingdom) David Mason (United Kingdom) Calum Lockie (S) (E)	No. 7 FF Corse (S) (E)	(United Kingdom) Witt Gamski (United Kingdom) Joe Macari	(Wales) Bonamy Grimes (United Kingdom) Johnny Mowlem	(United Kingdom) Darren Lewis (United Kingdom) Tom Knight	(United Kingdom) Rob Hudson (Brazil) Adriano Medeiros	(Wales) Alyn James (United Kingdom) Martin Byford	(United Kingdom) David Mason (United Kingdom) Calum Lockie	None	(United Kingdom) Sean Cooper	(Wales) Kristian Prosser (United Kingdom) Simon Baker	(United Kingdom) Rob Baker
5	R9	Donington Park	(Spain) Manuel Cintrano (Spain) Javier Morcillo	(Spain) Manuel Cintrano (Spain) Javier Morcillo	(Spain) Manuel Cintrano (Spain) Javier Morcillo	No. 3 Neil Garner Motorsport	(Spain) Manuel Cintrano (Spain) Javier Morcillo	(Wales) Bonamy Grimes (United Kingdom) Charlie Hollings	(United Kingdom) Mike Moss (United Kingdom) Scott Adam	(United Kingdom) Rob Hudson (Brazil) Adriano Medeiros	None	(United Kingdom) David Mason (United Kingdom) Calum Lockie	None	(United Kingdom) Marcus Clutton	(Wales) Kristian Prosser (United Kingdom) Frank Bradley	(United Kingdom) Roland Hopkins (United Kingdom) Matt Sleigh
5	R10	Donington Park		(United Kingdom) David Mason (United Kingdom) Calum Lockie (S) (United Kingdom) Witt Gamski (Scotland) Ross Wylie (E)	(United Kingdom) David Mason (United Kingdom) Calum Lockie (S) (Spain) Manuel Cintrano (Spain) Javier Morcillo (E)	No. 7 FF Corse (S) No. 3 Neil Garner Motorsport (E)	(Spain) Manuel Cintrano (Spain) Javier Morcillo	(Wales) Bonamy Grimes (United Kingdom) Charlie Hollings	(United Kingdom) Angus Dudley (United Kingdom) Callum Hawkins-Row	(United Kingdom) Rob Hudson (Brazil) Adriano Medeiros	(United Kingdom) Colin Willmott (United Kingdom) James Crabtree	(United Kingdom) David Mason (United Kingdom) Calum Lockie	None	(United Kingdom) Marcus Clutton	(United Kingdom) Sam Allpass	(Republic of Ireland) Barry McMahon
6	R11	Oulton Park	(United Kingdom) Rob Wheldon (United Kingdom) Stefano Leaney	(United Kingdom) Witt Gamski (Scotland) Ross Wylie	(Wales) Bonamy Grimes (United Kingdom) Johnny Mowlem	No. 5 FF Corse	(United Kingdom) Witt Gamski (Scotland) Ross Wylie	(Wales) Bonamy Grimes (United Kingdom) Johnny Mowlem	(United Kingdom) Chris Papageorgiou (South Africa) Jayde Kruger	None	None	None	None	(United Kingdom) Michael Igoe (United Kingdom) Adam Wilcox	(United Kingdom) Adam Hatfield	(United Kingdom) Rob Baker (United Kingdom) Sarah Moore
6	R12	Oulton Park		(United Kingdom) Michael Igoe (United Kingdom) Adam Wilcox (S) (United Kingdom) Witt Gamski (Scotland) Ross Wylie (E)	(United Kingdom) Michael Igoe (United Kingdom) Adam Wilcox (S) (Wales) Bonamy Grimes (United Kingdom) Johnny Mowlem (E)	No. JMH Automotive (S) No. 5 FF Corse(E)	(United Kingdom) Witt Gamski (Scotland) Ross Wylie	(Wales) Bonamy Grimes (United Kingdom) Johnny Mowlem	(United Kingdom) Darren Lewis (United Kingdom) Adam Shepherd	None	None	None	None	(United Kingdom) Michael Igoe (United Kingdom) Adam Wilcox	(United Kingdom) Edward Moore (United Kingdom) Marmaduke Hall	(United Kingdom) Rob Baker (United Kingdom) Sarah Moore
7	R13	Silverstone National	(United Kingdom) Rob Wheldon (United Kingdom) Stefano Leaney	(United Kingdom) David Mason (United Kingdom) Calum Lockie (S) (United Kingdom) Witt Gamski (Scotland) Ross Wylie (E)	(United Kingdom) Richard Neary (S) (United Kingdom) Witt Gamski (Scotland) Ross Wylie (E)	No. 88 Team ABBA Racing (S) No. 43 MJC Furlonger (E)	(United Kingdom) Witt Gamski (Scotland) Ross Wylie	None	(United Kingdom) Tom Barley (United Kingdom) Adam Hatfield	None	None	(United Kingdom) Richard Neary	None	(United Kingdom) Marcus Fothergill (New Zealand) Dave Benett (United Kingdom) Craig Davies	(United Kingdom) Ed Platt (United Kingdom) Ashley Bird	(United Kingdom) Rob Baker (United Kingdom) Sarah Moore
8	R14	Brands Hatch Indy Circuit	(United Kingdom) Rob Wheldon (United Kingdom) Stefano Leaney	(United Kingdom) Witt Gamski (Scotland) Ross Wylie	(Wales) Bonamy Grimes (United Kingdom) Johnny Mowlem	No. 5 FF Corse	(United Kingdom) Witt Gamski (Scotland) Ross Wylie	(Wales) Bonamy Grimes (United Kingdom) Johnny Mowlem	(United Kingdom) Mike Moss (United Kingdom) Kevin Clarke	(United Kingdom) Sam Allpass (United Kingdom) Clint Bardwell	None	(United Kingdom) David Mason (United Kingdom) Calum Lockie	(United Kingdom) Neil Garnham (United Kingdom) Matt Le Breton (United Kingdom) Rob Young	(United Kingdom) Marcus Fothergill (New Zealand) Dave Benett	(United Kingdom) Tom Howard (United Kingdom) Adam Hayes	(Wales) Alyn James (United Kingdom) Martin Byford
8	R15	Brands Hatch Indy Circuit		(United Kingdom) David Mason (United Kingdom) Calum Lockie (S) (United Kingdom) Witt Gamski (Scotland) Ross Wylie (E)	(United Kingdom) David Mason (United Kingdom) Calum Lockie (S) (United Kingdom) Rob Wheldon (United Kingdom) Stefano Leaney (E)	No. 7 FF Corse (S) No. 96 RAW Motorsport (E)	(United Kingdom) Rob Wheldon (United Kingdom) Stefano Leaney	(Wales) Bonamy Grimes (United Kingdom) Johnny Mowlem	(United Kingdom) Mike Moss (United Kingdom) Kevin Clarke	(United Kingdom) Sam Allpass (United Kingdom) Clint Bardwell	None	(United Kingdom) David Mason (United Kingdom) Calum Lockie	None	(United Kingdom) Sean Cooper (United Kingdom) Brad Nevison	(United Kingdom) Edward Moore (United Kingdom) Marmaduke Hall	(Wales) Alyn James (United Kingdom) Martin Byford

=== Championship Standings ===
(key)

Pos.	Driver	No.	Class	SIL		SNE		SIL		BRH		DON		OUL		SIL	BRH		Pts
Endurance Category Standings
1	(United Kingdom) Witt Gamski	43	1	3	5	**3**	1	**1**	1	**4**	3	2	14	3	6	1	2	2	306
1	(Scotland) Ross Wylie	43	1	3	5	**3**	1	**1**	1			2	14	3	6	1	2	2	306
1	(United Kingdom) Joe Macari	43	1							**4**	3								306
2	(United Kingdom) Darron Lewis	285	3	10	8	10	8	8	5	2	2	9	10	6	2	4	6	15	287
2	(United Kingdom) Tom Knight	285	3	10	8	10	8	8	5	2	2	9	10			4	6	15	287
2	(United Kingdom) Adam Shepherd	285	3											6	2				287
3	(United Kingdom) Simon Rudd	24	3	9	6	8	5	9	6	6	5	7	13	7	7	3	DNS	7	278
3	(United Kingdom) Tom Barley	24	3	9	6	8	5			6	5	7	13	7	7		DNS	7	278
3	(United Kingdom) Will Philips	24	3					9	6										278
3	(United Kingdom) Adam Hatfield	24	3													3			278
4	(Wales) Bonamy Grimes	5	2	4	1	**2**	3	**2**	Ret	**1**	1	**3**	3	**1**	1		**1**	4	256
4	(United Kingdom) Johnny Mowlem	5	2	4	1	**2**	3	**2**	Ret	**1**	1			**1**	1		**1**	4	256
4	(United Kingdom) Charlie Hollings	5	2									**3**	3						256
5	(United Kingdom) Angus Dudley (United Kingdom) Callum Hawkins-Row	33	3	Ret	14	9	7	7	4	7	7	DNS	4	8	10	5	11	DNS	219
6	(United Kingdom) Mark Cunningham (United Kingdom) Peter Cunningham	32	3	**11**	17	**11**	6	**15**	8	**3**	4	**6**	Ret	**Ret**	4				199
6	(United Kingdom) Frank Bradley	32	3					**15**	8										199
7	(United Kingdom) Chris Murphy	72	3	15	11	15	10	10	9	9	Ret	Ret	7	9	9	Ret	8	8	195
7	(United Kingdom) Dean Gibbs	72	3	15	11	15	10												195
7	(United Kingdom) Matty George	72	3					10	9	9	Ret	Ret	7			Ret	8	8	195
7	(United Kingdom) Phil Glew	72	3											9	9				195
8	(United Kingdom) Rob Hudson (Brazil) Adriano Medeiros	28	4	18	19	**14**	9			12	9	**14**	9						129
9	(United Kingdom) Sam Allpass	38	4	13	10			**12**	10								**15**	14	124
9	(United Kingdom) Clint Bardwell	38	4	13	10												**15**	14	124
9	(United Kingdom) Jamie Martin	38	4					**12**	10										124
10	(United Kingdom) Mike Moss	18	3					Ret	DNS	DNS	DNS	5	6	15	8		3	6	122
10	(United Kingdom) Scott Adam	18	3					Ret	DNS	DNS	DNS	5	6	15	8				122
10	(United Kingdom) Kevin Clarke	18	3														3	6	122
11	(Spain) Manuel Cintrano (Spain) Javier Morcillo	3	1	**2**	16			DNS	DNS			**1**	1				19	3	120
12	(Wales) Alyn James	76	5			**16**	11	19	11	**15**	15								113
12	(United Kingdom) Dan Wheeler	76	5			**16**	11	19	11										113
12	(United Kingdom) Martin Byford	76	5							**15**	15								113
13	(United Kingdom) Graham Lucking (United Kingdom) Leyton Clarke	4	2	Ret	20	6	4	5	2										92
14	(Canada) Fareed Ali (United Kingdom) Chris Valentine	249	3					21	14										88
14	(Latvia) Gleb Stepanovs	249	3							21	12	17	11				14	8	88
14	(United Kingdom) Steve Tomkins	249	3							21	12						14	8	88
14	(United Kingdom) Lee Goble	249	3									17	11						88
15	(United Kingdom) Nigel Hudson (United Kingdom) Adam Wilcox	12	1	5	2	1	**2**												87
16	(United Kingdom) Mike Wilds (United Kingdom) Dino Zamparelli	9	2	**1**	5	Ret	12												76
17	(United Kingdom) Rob Wheldon (United Kingdom) Stefano Leaney	96	1											Ret	DNS	**2**	**4**	1	69
18	(United Kingdom) Jonny MacGregor	8	1	22	9			4	3										68
18	(United Kingdom) Ben Sharich	8	1					4	3										68
19	(United Kingdom) Richard Burrows (United Kingdom) Patrick Watts	14	4					24	13	**16**	10								59
20	(United Kingdom) Mike Moss	18	2	NC	15	12	Ret												59
20	(United Kingdom) Jonathan Evans	18	2	NC	15														59
20	(United Kingdom) Scott Adam	18	2			12	Ret												59
21	(United Kingdom) Jon Watt (United Kingdom) Simon Baker	57	4	Ret	13														40
22	(United Kingdom) Marc Brough (United Kingdom) Charlie Hollings	23	2	7	3														37
23	(United Kingdom) Daniel Woodard (United Kingdom) David Birell	49	5	26	Ret	18	Ret												32
24	(United Kingdom) David Mason (United Kingdom) Calum Lockie	7	1	6	EX	7													31
25	(United Kingdom) Toby Bearne (United Kingdom) Daniel Wylie	11	3	11	7	Ret	DNS												31
26	(Republic of Ireland) Barry McMahon	157	5	**DNS**	DNS			**18**	16										27
26	(Republic of Ireland) Arthur McMahon	157	5	**DNS**	DNS														27
27	(Belgium) Laurent De Meeus (United Kingdom) Jamie Stanley	22	2	25	18														25
28	(Australia) Mal Sandford (United Kingdom) Ben Seyfried	10	3													6	DNS	13	25
29	(United Kingdom) Danny Russell (United Kingdom) Simon Garrad	91	5					Ret	12										20
29	(United Kingdom) Neil Garnham (United Kingdom) Rob Young	88	3	Ret	12														17
drivers ineligible for points
–	(United Kingdom) Jonny MacGregor	8	1Inv									DNS	2						0
–	(South Africa) Jayde Kruger	22	3Inv									DNS	5	4	3		Ret	5	0
–	(United Kingdom) Chris Papageorgiou	22	3Inv									DNS	5	4	3				0
–	(United Kingdom) Andreas Demetriou	22	3Inv														Ret	5	0
–	(United Kingdom) Sean Cooper (United Kingdom) Mike McCollum	262	3Inv									8	8	5	5				0
–	(United Kingdom) Paul Hollywood (United Kingdom) Andrew Howard	407	3Inv					11	6										0
–	(United Kingdom) Stewart Lines	95	4Inv					13									10	9	0
–	(United Kingdom) Ollie Taylor	95	4Inv														10	9	0
–	(United Kingdom) Jake Rattenbury (United Kingdom) Mike Sellar	39	2Inv														12	10	0
–	(United Kingdom) Neil Garnham (United Kingdom) Matt Le Breton (United Kingdom) Rob Young	14	3Inv														20	11	0
–	(United Kingdom) Colin Willmott (United Kingdom) James Crabtree	22	5Inv									Ret	12						0
–	(United Kingdom) Jamie Stanley (United Kingdom) Chris Headlam	55	3Inv					Ret	Ret										0
Sprint Category Standings
1	(United Kingdom) Rick Nevinson	17	3	24	3	**17**	5	**Ret**	Ret					NC	8	4			249
1	(United Kingdom) Sean Cooper	17	3	24	3			**Ret**	Ret	**11**	2					4	**18**	6	249
1	(United Kingdom) Matt Cherrington	17	3			**17**	5												249
1	(United Kingdom) Marcus Clutton	17	3									10	2						249
1	(United Kingdom) Brad Nevinson	17	3											NC	8		**18**	6	249
2	(United Kingdom) Roland Hopkins	80	5	23	6			**23**	9	18	6	18	6	17	11	Ret	NC	Ret	247
2	(United Kingdom) Matt Sleigh	80	5	23	6			**23**	9	18	6								247
2	(United Kingdom) Matthew Boyce	80	5									18	6	17	11	Ret	NC	Ret	247
3	(United Kingdom) Edward Moore	15	4	**8**	1	**13**	4	**Ret**	4	**8**	NC	**NC**	Ret	**13**	2	**7**	**16**	2	246
3	(United Kingdom) Marmaduke Hall	15	4					**Ret**	4	**8**	NC	**NC**	Ret	**13**	2	**7**	**16**	2	246
4	(United Kingdom) Rob Baker	52	5	**21**	5					17	5	Ret	DNS	**16**	9	**8**	NC	8	233
4	(United Kingdom) Jonathan Swan	52	5	**21**	5														233
4	(United Kingdom) Sarah Moore	52	5											**16**	9	**8**	NC	8	233
5	(United Kingdom) Marcus Fothergill (New Zealand) Dave Benett	69	3	**16**	Ret					10	4	13	5	**14**	7	3	17	7	229
5	(United Kingdom) Craig Davies	69	3													3			229
6	(United Kingdom) David Mason (United Kingdom) Calum Lockie	7	1				2	**3**	1	**5**	1	**4**	1			**2**	**22**	1	176
7	(Wales) Kristian Prosser	57	4							Ret	3	12	Ret	12	Ret				154
7	(United Kingdom) Simon Baker	57	4							Ret	3			12	Ret				154
7	(United Kingdom) Frank Bradley	57	4									12	Ret						154
7	(United Kingdom) Ed Platt (United Kingdom) Ashley Bird	57	4													12			154
7	(United Kingdom) Tom Howard (United Kingdom) Adam Hayes	57	4														5	Ret	154
8	(Wales) Alyn James (United Kingdom) Martin Byford	76	5														**7**	5	53
9	(United Kingdom) Mark Murfitt (United Kingdom) Michael Broadhurst	48	3					14	6										52
10	(United Kingdom) Marcus Vivian	58	5	20	DNS			14	DNS										51
10	(United Kingdom) Derek Holden	58	5					14	DNS										51
11	(United Kingdom) Mark Wakefield	41	5							**13**	Ret	DNS	DNS	Ret	Ret				46
11	(United Kingdom) Richard Woods	41	5							**13**	Ret			Ret	Ret				46
11	(United Kingdom) Ray Grimes	41	5									DNS	DNS						46
12	(United Kingdom) Neil Garnham (United Kingdom) Rob Young	6	3	14	DNS														45
13	(United Kingdom) Rob MacFarlane	26	3					20	8										40
14	(United Kingdom) Ollie Taylor (United Kingdom) Tom Walker	95	4											Ret	3				38
15	(United Kingdom) Simon Baker	61	4					17	7										37
16	(Belgium) Laurent de Meeus (United Kingdom) Jamie Stanley	22	2			**5**	1												34
17	(United Kingdom) Marc Brough (United Kingdom) Andrew Bentley	23	2			4	3												31
18	(United Kingdom) Andy Wilson (United Kingdom) Peter Snowdon	97	5											Ret	10				31
19	(United Kingdom) Neil Garnham (United Kingdom) Rob Young	6	4					16	5										25
20	(United Kingdom) Kevin Riley	27	1	**19**	4														24
21	(United Kingdom) Neil Garnham (United Kingdom) Rob Young (United Kingdom) Matt Le Breton	71	2														**9**	Ret	23
22	(United Kingdom) Paul Calladine	92	4	12	2														20
23	(United Kingdom) Richard Neary	8	1													1			17
drivers ineligible for points
–	(United Kingdom) Adam Wilcox (United Kingdom) Michael Igoe	98	3Inv											**2**	1				0
–	(United Kingdom) Oliver Willmott	70	3Inv					**6**	2			**Ret**	Ret	Ret	4				0
–	(United Kingdom) Colin Willmott	70	3Inv					**6**	2										0
–	(United Kingdom) Katie Milner	70	3Inv									**Ret**	Ret	Ret	4				0
–	(United Kingdom) Stewart Lines	95	4Inv						3										0
–	(United Kingdom) Simon Moore	25	4Inv											11	6	13			0
–	(United Kingdom) Rob Hedley	25	4Inv											11	6				0
–	(United Kingdom) Lucas Nanetti	25	4Inv													13	Ret	3	0
–	(United Kingdom) Jacob Jackson	25	4Inv														Ret	3	0
–	(United Kingdom) Sam Allpass	38	4Inv									11	3						0
–	(Republic of Ireland) Barry McMahon	157	5Inv									16	4			Ret			0
–	(United Kingdom) Ben Wallace (United Kingdom) Jesse Chamberlain	49	4Inv														14	4	0
–	(United Kingdom) Adam Hatfield	49	5Inv									15	Ret						0
–	(United Kingdom) Adam Hatfield	49	4Inv											10	5				0
–	(United Kingdom) Sam De Haan	78	4Inv														13	Ret	0
–	(United Kingdom) Mike Moss	18	3Inv													Ret			0
–	(United Kingdom) Alan Purbrick (United Kingdom) David Brise	23	3Inv									Ret	DNS						0
–	(United Kingdom) Jonny MacGregor	8	1Inv									DNS	DNS						0
Pos.	Driver	No.	Class	SIL		SNE		SIL		BRH		DON		OUL		SIL	BRH		Pts

Key
Colour	Result
Gold	Winner
Silver	Second place
Bronze	Third place
Green	Other points position
Blue	Other classified position
Blue	Not classified, finished (NC)
Purple	Not classified, retired (Ret)
Red	Did not qualify (DNQ)
Red	Did not pre-qualify (DNPQ)
Black	Disqualified (DSQ)
White	Did not start (DNS)
White	Race cancelled (C)
Blank	Did not practice (DNP)
Blank	Excluded (EX)
Blank	Did not arrive (DNA)
Blank	Withdrawn (WD)
Blank	Did not enter (cell empty)
Text formatting	Meaning
**Bold**	Pole position
Italics	Fastest lap
