= 2019 Britcar Endurance Championship =

The 2019 Dunlop Endurance Championship was a motor racing championship for GT cars, touring cars, sportscars and Production cars held across England. Cars compete in five classes with a car's class decided on horsepower, momentum, equipment, etc. It was the 17th season of a Britcar championship, the 8th run as the Britcar Endurance Championship and the 4th run as the Dunlop Britcar Endurance Championship. The championship changed back to 60-minute races for 2019.: The season began on 30 March at Silverstone and ended on 10 November at Brands Hatch.

Dunlop supplied tyres for every team at all events throughout the year.

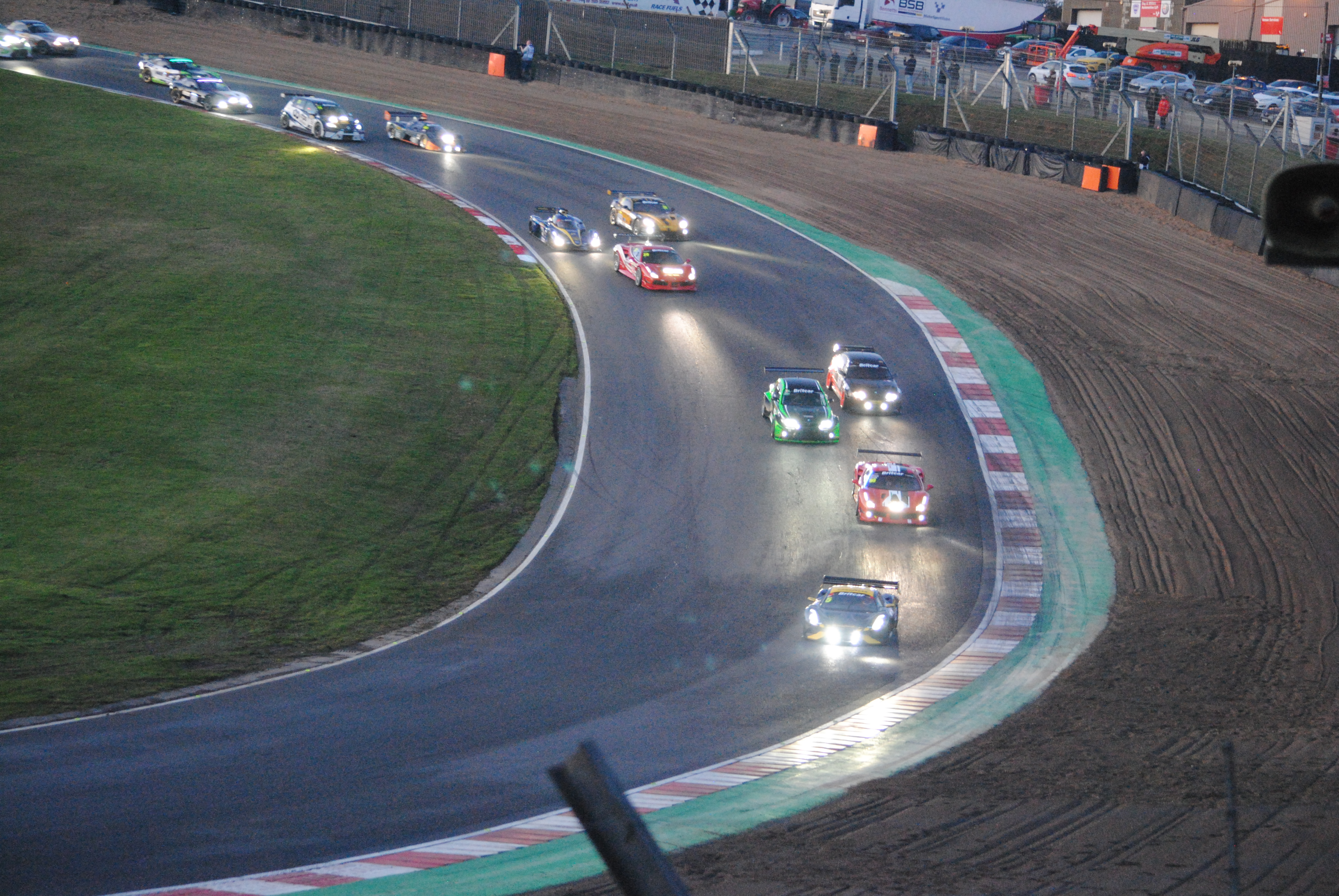
The start of the final race of the year at Brands Hatch

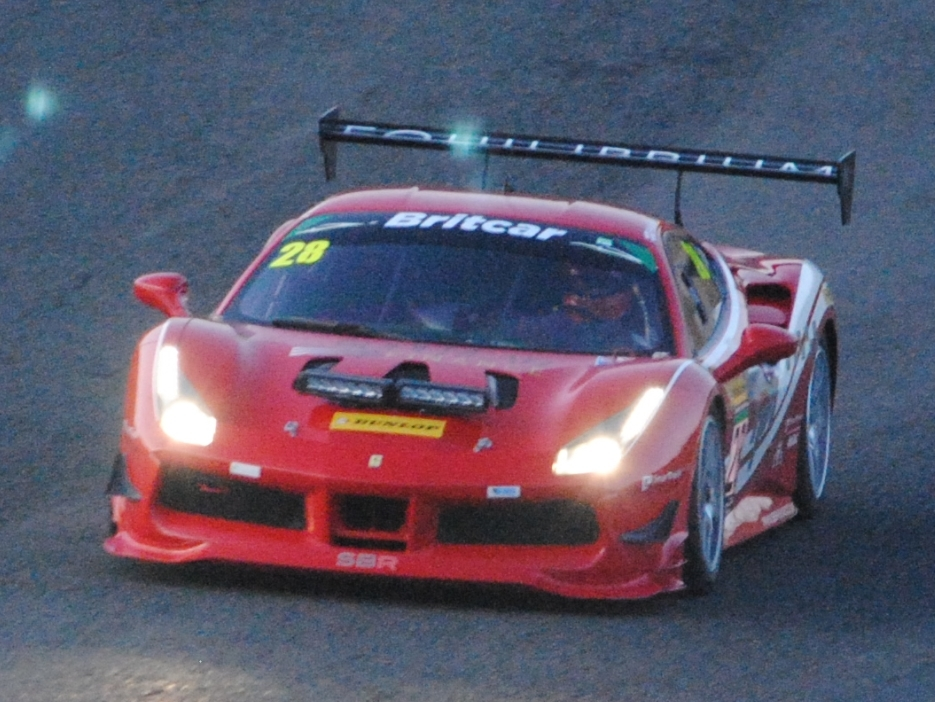
Paul Bailey and Andy Schulz were the Class 2 and overall champions in a Ferrari 488 Challenge.

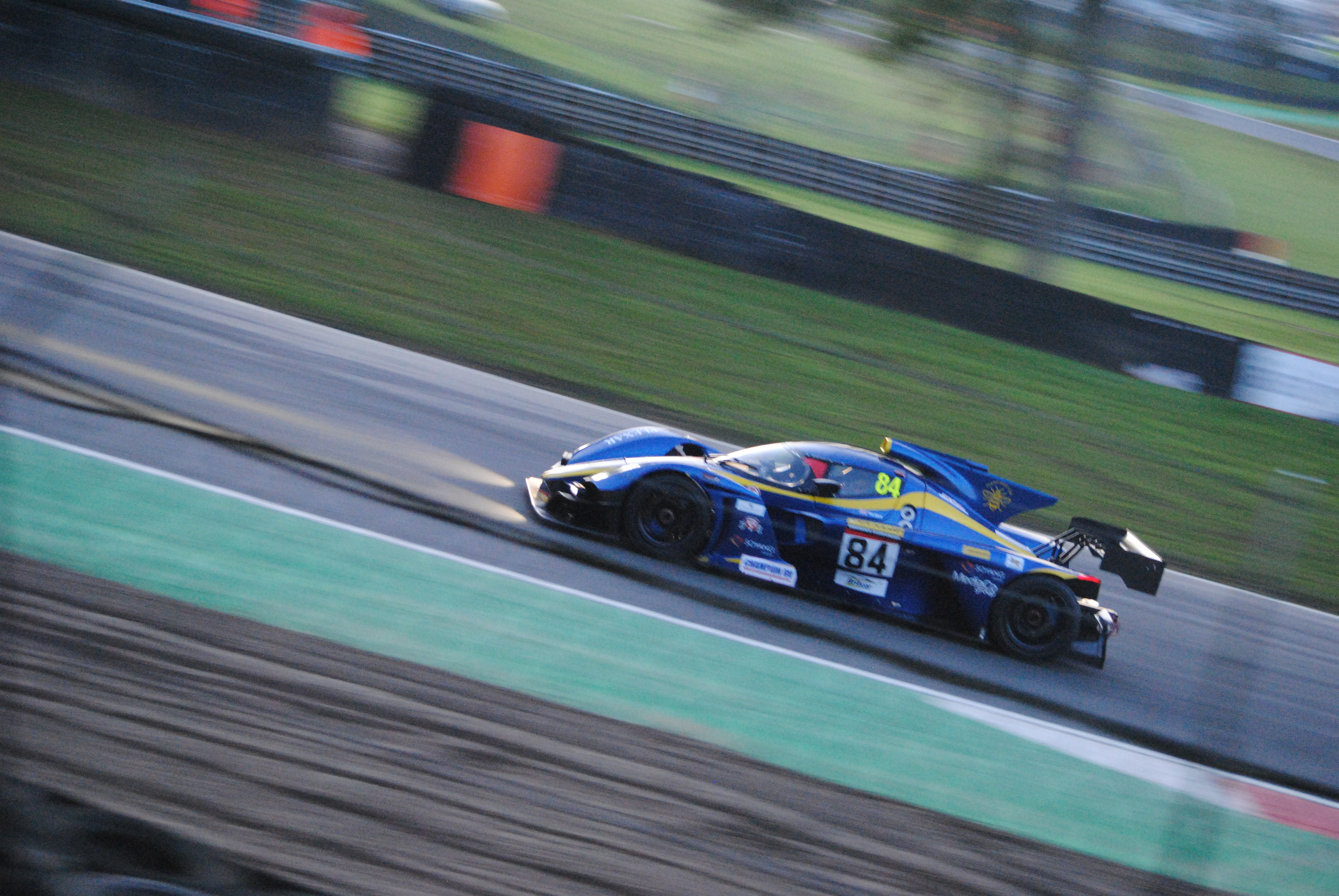
Tim Gray, Alistair Boulton and Grant Williams were the Class 1 champion in a Praga R1T

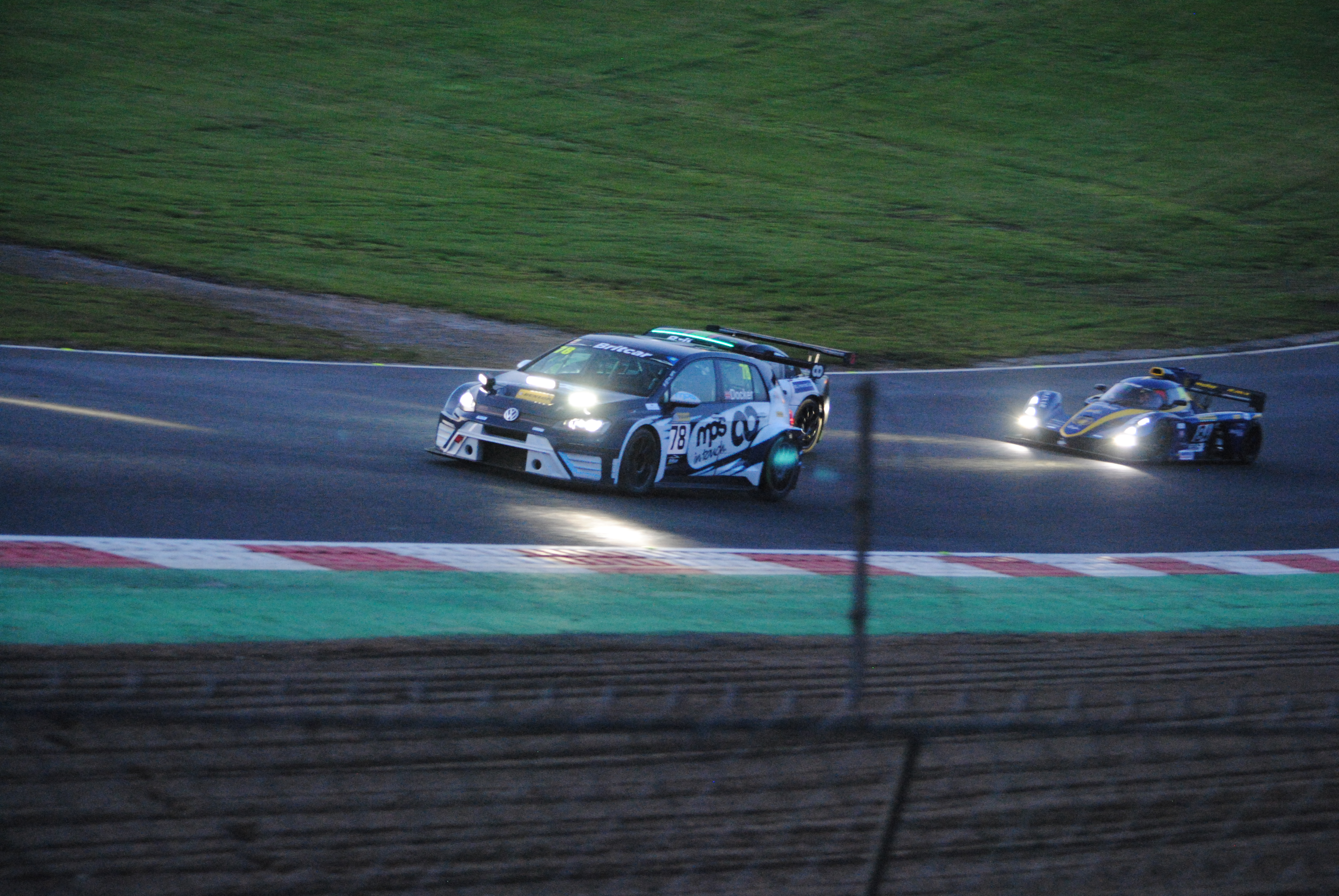
Tim Docker was the Class 4 champion in a VW Golf GTI TCR

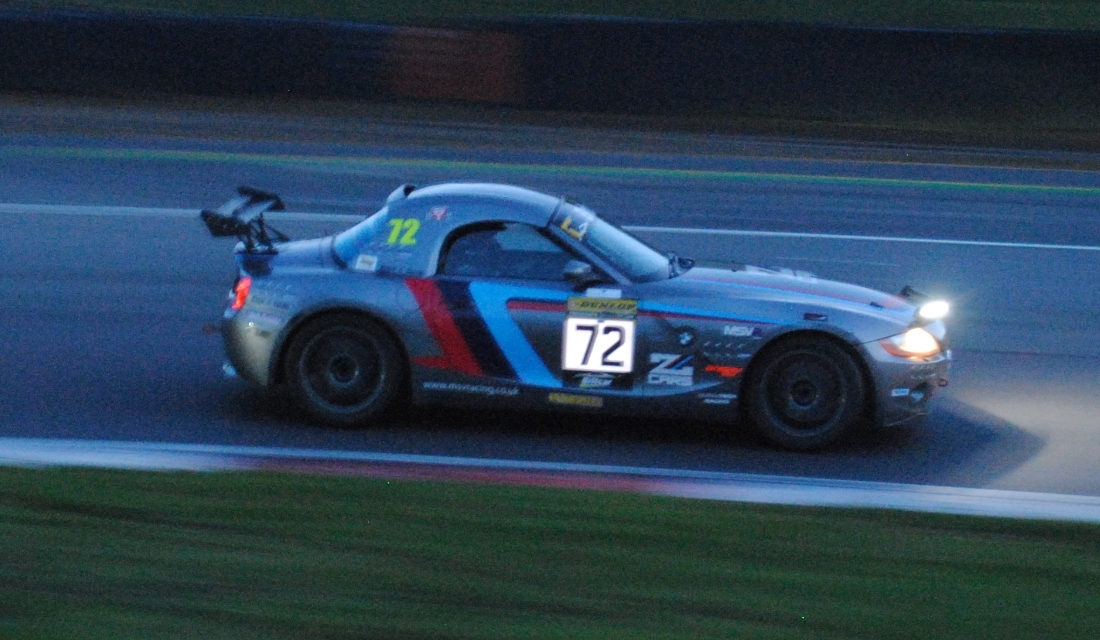
Chris Murphy was the Class 5 champion in a BMW Z4

The Class 1 championship title was won by Tim Gray, Alistair Boulton and Grant Williams, Paul Bailey and Andy Schulz were the Class 2 champions, the Class 3 champions were Mark and Peter Cunningham, Tim Docker won the Class 4 championship title and Class 5 was won by Chris Murphy. The overall championship was sealed by Paul Bailey and Andy Schulz, who were 34 points ahead of Tim Docker.

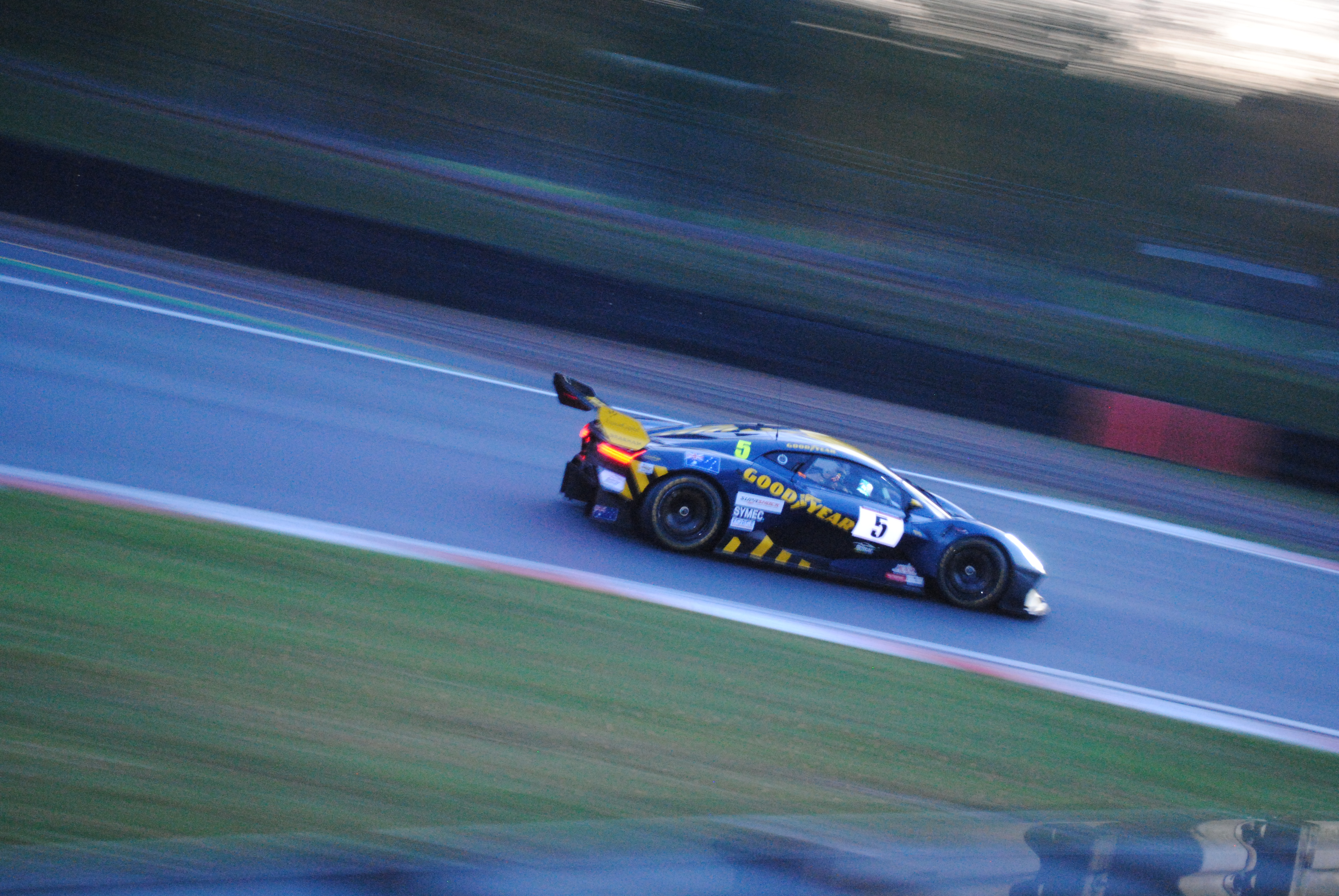
Will Powell driving the Brabham BT62 at Brands Hatch

The season also saw the entry and marked the racing debut of the Brabham BT62.

== Calendar ==
Each race, 1-hour or 2-hour, would consist of one mandatory pit stop and driver change.

Round	Circuit	Length	Date
1	(United Kingdom) Silverstone International, Northamptonshire	60 min	30 March
1	(United Kingdom) Silverstone International, Northamptonshire	60 min	30 March
2	(United Kingdom) Silverstone GP, Northamptonshire	60 min	27 April
2	(United Kingdom) Silverstone GP, Northamptonshire	60 min	27 April
3	(United Kingdom) Brands Hatch Indy Circuit, Kent	60 min	11 May
3	(United Kingdom) Brands Hatch Indy Circuit, Kent	60 min	11 May
4	(United Kingdom) Donington National, Leicestershire	60 min	1 June
4	(United Kingdom) Donington National, Leicestershire	60 min	1 June
5	(United Kingdom) Oulton Park International, Cheshire	60 min	22 June
5	(United Kingdom) Oulton Park International, Cheshire	60 min	22 June
6	(United Kingdom) Snetterton 300, Norfolk	60 min	10 August
6	(United Kingdom) Snetterton 300, Norfolk	60 min	10 August
7	(United Kingdom) Oulton Park Island, Cheshire	60 min	26 October
7	(United Kingdom) Oulton Park Island, Cheshire	60 min	26 October
8	(United Kingdom) Brands Hatch Indy Circuit, Kent	60 min	9-10 November
8	(United Kingdom) Brands Hatch Indy Circuit, Kent	120 min	9-10 November

== Teams and drivers ==
Cars were assigned classed based on speed, horsepower, momentum, equipment fitted to the car and the car's model;
Class 1: GT3, prototype cars
Class 2: GT4, cup (one-make series) cars
Class 3: Cup (one-make series) cars
Class 4: GT4, cup and TCR cars
Class 5: Production cars

Team	Car	No.	Drivers	Rounds
Class 1
JPR Motorsport	Saker RAPX	3	(United Kingdom) Paul Rose	1–7
JPR Motorsport	Saker RAPX	3	(United Kingdom) Kristian Rose	6–7
JPR Motorsport	Saker RAPX	4	(United Kingdom) Steve Harris	1–2, 4–7
JPR Motorsport	Saker RAPX	4	(United Kingdom) Chris Hart	2, 5–7
JPR Motorsport	Saker RAPX	4	(United Kingdom) Paul Rose	4
MacG Racing	Taranis	8	(United Kingdom) Jonny MacGregor	1–2, 4, 6
MacG Racing	Taranis	8	(United Kingdom) Ben Sharich	1–2, 6
Simon Green Motorsport	McLaren 650s GT3	29	(United Kingdom) Lee Frost	1, 4–5
Simon Green Motorsport	McLaren 650s GT3	29	(United Kingdom) Lucky Khera	1, 4–5
ING Sport	BMW Z4 GT3	46	(United Kingdom) Kevin Clarke	1
ING Sport	BMW Z4 GT3	46	(United Kingdom) Ian Lawson	1
ING Sport	BMW Z4 GT3	46	(United Kingdom) Ryan Lindsay	1
JMH Automotive	Lamborghini Huracan GT3	55	(United Kingdom) Marcus Clutton	1
JMH Automotive	Lamborghini Huracan GT3	55	(United Kingdom) John Seale	1
VR Motorsport	Praga R1T	84	(United Kingdom) Tim Gray	1–2, 4–5, 7–8
VR Motorsport	Praga R1T	84	(United Kingdom) Alastair Boulton	2–4, 6
VR Motorsport	Praga R1T	84	(Wales) Grant Williams	3, 5–6
Class 1 Invitation
Brabham Automotive	Brabham BT62	5	(Australia) David Brabham	8
Brabham Automotive	Brabham BT62	5	(United Kingdom) Will Powell	8
Team ABBA Racing	Mercedes AMG GT3	88	(United Kingdom) Richard Neary	6
Team ABBA Racing	Mercedes AMG GT3	88	(United Kingdom) Sam Neary	6
VR Motorsport	Praga R1S	96	(United Kingdom) Alastair Boulton	7
VR Motorsport	Praga R1S	96	(United Kingdom) Jack Fabby	7
Class 2
FF Corse	Ferrari 488 Challenge	7	(United Kingdom) David Mason	1–4
FF Corse	Ferrari 488 Challenge	7	(United Kingdom) Ross Wylie	1–4
JMH Automotive	Ferrari 488 Challenge	10	(United Kingdom) Charlie Hollings	1–2
JMH Automotive	Ferrari 488 Challenge	10	(United Kingdom) Wayne Marrs	1–2
Track Focused	McLaren 570S GT4	13	(United Kingdom) Will Alterman	1
Track Focused	McLaren 570S GT4	13	(United Kingdom) Stuart Willson	1
Track Focused	Ferrari 488 Challenge	13	(United Kingdom) Sean Cooper	2
Track Focused	Ferrari 488 Challenge	13	(United Kingdom) Stuart Willson	2
Moss Motorsport	BMW 1M E82	18	(United Kingdom) Mike Moss	1, 3, 5, 7–8
Moss Motorsport	BMW 1M E82	18	(United Kingdom) Robert Gilham	1
Moss Motorsport	BMW 1M E82	18	(United Kingdom) Charles Lamb	3
Moss Motorsport	BMW 1M E82	18	(United Kingdom) Kevin Clarke	5, 7
Moss Motorsport	BMW 1M E82	18	(United Kingdom) Ollie Hancock	8
SB Race Engineering	Ferrari 488 Challenge	28	(United Kingdom) Paul Bailey	All
SB Race Engineering	Ferrari 488 Challenge	28	(United Kingdom) Andy Schultz	All
ALP Racing	Saker RAPX	65	(United Kingdom) Alan Purbrick	All
ALP Racing	Saker RAPX	65	(United Kingdom) David Brise	1–4, 6–8
RAW Motorsport	Ginetta G55 Supercup	77	(United Kingdom) Steve Burgess	2
RAW Motorsport	Ginetta G55 Supercup	77	(United Kingdom) Ben Dimmack	2
Class 2 Invitation
JPR Motorsport	Saker RAPX	8	(United Kingdom) Steve Walton	7
Simon Green Motorsport	Ferrari 488 Challenge	98	(United Kingdom) Lee Frost	8
Simon Green Motorsport	Ferrari 488 Challenge	98	(United Kingdom) Lucky Khera	8
Class 3
Simon Green Motorsport	Ginetta G55 Supercup	24	(United Kingdom) Lucky Khera	3
Simon Green Motorsport	Ginetta G55 Supercup	98	(United Kingdom) Lee Frost	3, 7
Simon Green Motorsport	Ginetta G55 Supercup	98	(United Kingdom) Lucky Khera	7
SG Racing	Porsche 997 Cup	32	(United Kingdom) Mark Cunningham	1–7
SG Racing	Porsche 997 Cup	32	(United Kingdom) Peter Cunningham	1–3, 5–7
Peter Bassill Racing	Ginetta G55 Supercup	58	(United Kingdom) Peter Bassill	5–8
Peter Bassill Racing	Ginetta G55 Supercup	58	(United Kingdom) Emily Linscott	5–8
Track Group Ltd	Porsche 991 GT3 Cup	70	(United Kingdom) Marcus Jewell	1, 5
Track Group Ltd	Porsche 991 GT3 Cup	70	(United Kingdom) Lewis Plato	1
Track Group Ltd	Porsche 991 GT3 Cup	70	(United Kingdom) Ben Clucas	5
RAW Motorsport	Ginetta G55 Supercup	77	(United Kingdom) Steve Burgess	3–4, 6–7
RAW Motorsport	Ginetta G55 Supercup	77	(United Kingdom) Ben Dimmack	3–4, 6–7
Valluga Racing	Porsche 991 GT3 Cup	991	(United Kingdom) Adam Hatfield	1–2
Valluga Racing	Porsche 991 GT3 Cup	991	(United Kingdom) Adam Knight	1
Valluga Racing	Porsche 991 GT3 Cup	991	(United Kingdom) Ian Humphries	2, 4–5, 7
Valluga Racing	Porsche 991 GT3 Cup	991	(United Kingdom) Benji Hetherington	4
Class 3 Invitation
Team HARD.	Ginetta G55 GT4	35	(United Kingdom) Steven Chandler	8
Team HARD.	Ginetta G55 GT4	35	(United Kingdom) Nick Scott-Dickeson	8
Team HARD.	Ginetta G55 GT4	37	(United Kingdom) Ben Claydon	8
Team HARD.	Ginetta G55 GT4	37	(United Kingdom) Michael Epps	8
RVS Tec Racing	Ginetta G55 Supercup	101	(United Kingdom) Will Stacey	6
RVS Tec Racing	Ginetta G55 Supercup	101	(United Kingdom) Sam Tomlinson	6
Team Abba Racing	BMW M3 E46	334	(United Kingdom) Richard Neary	7
Team Abba Racing	BMW M3 E46	334	(United Kingdom) Sam Neary	7
Class 4
Rothery Racing	Peugeot 308 Racing Cup	14	(United Kingdom) Steve Rothery	4, 8
Rothery Racing	Peugeot 308 Racing Cup	14	(United Kingdom) Chris Whiteman	4
Track Focused	Porsche 718 Cayman GT4 Clubsport	17	(United Kingdom) Brad Nevinson	5, 7
Track Focused	Porsche 718 Cayman GT4 Clubsport	17	(United Kingdom) Rick Nevinson	5, 7
Tockwith Motorsport	Ginetta G50	26	(United Kingdom) Moh Ritson	1–6
Tockwith Motorsport	Ginetta G50	26	(United Kingdom) Sarah Moore	1–5
Tockwith Motorsport	Ginetta G50	26	(United Kingdom) Edward Moore	6
CTR Alfatune	SEAT León TCR	35	(United Kingdom) Chris Bentley	1–3
CTR Alfatune	SEAT León TCR	35	(United Kingdom) John Clonis	1
CTR Alfatune	SEAT León TCR	35	(United Kingdom) Rob Gilham	2–3
Geoff Steel Racing	BMW M3 GTR	38	(United Kingdom) Sam Allpass	1–3
Woodrow Motorsport	BMW 1 Series E82	39	(United Kingdom) Simon Baker	1
Simon Green Motorsport	BMW M3 E46	40	(United Kingdom) Jasver Sapra	8
Butler Motorsport	BMW M3 E46	40	(United Kingdom) Jasver Sapra	1
Butler Motorsport	BMW M3 E46	43	(United Kingdom) Piers Reid	1, 3–4
Techno Sport	BMW M3 E46	42	(United Kingdom) George Agyeton	2, 8
Moss Motorsport	BMW M3 E46	57	(United Kingdom) Charles Lamb	2
Moss Motorsport	BMW M3 E46	57	(United Kingdom) Mike Moss	2
EDF/BPM Motorsport	CUPRA León TCR	60	(United Kingdom) Martin Byford	1–5
EDF/BPM Motorsport	CUPRA León TCR	60	(United Kingdom) Ashley Woodman	1–5
EDF/Paul Calladine Motorsport	Ginetta G50 GT4	92	(United Kingdom) Graham Roberts	1–4, 6–7
EDF/Paul Calladine Motorsport	Ginetta G50 GT4	92	(United Kingdom) Paul Calladine	1–2, 4–7
Team BRIT	Aston Martin Vantage GT4	68	(United Kingdom) Martyn Compton	1–4
Team BRIT	Aston Martin Vantage GT4	68	(United Kingdom) Warren McKinlay	1–4
Team BRIT	Aston Martin Vantage GT4	68	(United Kingdom) Jon-Allan Butterworth	1
Bespoke Cars	Porsche 997 Cup	69	(United Kingdom) Dave Benett	1–2, 5
Bespoke Cars	Porsche 997 Cup	69	(New Zealand) Marcus Fothergill	1–2, 5
Forelle Estates	Porsche 718 Cayman GT4 Clubsport	74	(United Kingdom) Michael Price	4–6
Forelle Estates	Porsche 718 Cayman GT4 Clubsport	74	(United Kingdom) Peter Ecreg	4
Forelle Estates	Porsche 718 Cayman GT4 Clubsport	74	(United Kingdom) Simon Clarke	5
Forelle Estates	Porsche 718 Cayman GT4 Clubsport	74	(United Kingdom) Marcus Clutton	6
Maximum Motorsport	Volkswagen Golf GTI TCR	78	(United Kingdom) Tim Docker	All
Maximum Motorsport	CUPRA León TCR	95	(United Kingdom) Stewart Lines	1, 7
Maximum Motorsport	CUPRA León TCR	95	(United Kingdom) Ollie Taylor	1
Maximum Motorsport	CUPRA León TCR	95	(United Kingdom) Jamie Stanley	8
Maximum Motorsport	CUPRA León TCR	95	(United Kingdom) Nick Halstead	8
DAT Racing	SEAT León TCR	99	(United Kingdom) Guy Colclough	1–2, 4–5, 7
DAT Racing	SEAT León TCR	99	(United Kingdom) Max Coates	1, 4–5, 7
Derek McMahon Racing	Alfa Romeo 156 T	157	(Republic of Ireland) Barry McMahon	2
Team Abba Racing	BMW M3 E46	234	(United Kingdom) Richard Neary	1–3
Team Abba Racing	BMW M3 E46	234	(United Kingdom) Sam Neary	1–3
Class 4 Invitation
Intersport Racing	BMW M3 E46	46	(United Kingdom) Kevin Clarke	5, 8
Fox Motorsport	Mercedes AMG GT4	77	(United Kingdom) Michael Broadhurst	1
Fox Motorsport	Mercedes AMG GT4	77	(United Kingdom) Mark Murfitt	1
JW Bird Motorsport	Volkswagen Golf GTI TCR	96	(United Kingdom) Jeff Clark	6
JW Bird Motorsport	Volkswagen Golf GTI TCR	96	(United Kingdom) Ruaridh Clark	6
Class 5
Team Autobid Racing	Honda Civic	15	(United Kingdom) Andrew Stewart	1–2
Derek McMahon Racing	Honda Civic Type-R	45	(Republic of Ireland) Arthur McMahon	1–2
Derek McMahon Racing	Alfa Romeo 156 T	157	(Republic of Ireland) Barry McMahon	1
Woodard Racing	Mini JCW	49	(United Kingdom) Daniel Woodard	4
S2Smarts	Smart ForFour	52	(United Kingdom) Rob Baker	1–2, 4–6, 8
S2Smarts	Smart ForFour	52	(United Kingdom) Lucas Nanetti	1–2
S2Smarts	Smart ForFour	52	(United Kingdom) David Farrow	8
Whitebridge Motorsport	BMW Z4	72	(United Kingdom) Chris Murphy	1–2, 8
Class 5 Invitation
Matrix Motorsport	VW Golf Mk5	19	(United Kingdom) Jeff Alden	7
Matrix Motorsport	VW Golf Mk5	19	(United Kingdom) Rob Phillips	7

== Results ==
Round		Circuit	Pole position	Fastest lap	Overall winner	Winning C1	Winning C2	Winning C3	Winning C4	Winning C5
1	R1	Sliverstone International	No. 55 JMH Automotive	No. 55 JMH Automotive	No. 84 VR Motorsport	No. 84 VR Motorsport	No. 10 JMH Automotive	No. 991 Valluga Racing	No. 95 Maximum Motorsport	No. 157 Derek McMahon Racing
1	R1	Sliverstone International	(United Kingdom) John Seale (United Kingdom) Marcus Clutton	(United Kingdom) John Seale (United Kingdom) Marcus Clutton	(United Kingdom) Tim Gray	(United Kingdom) Tim Gray	(United Kingdom) Wayne Marrs (United Kingdom) Charlie Hollings	(United Kingdom) Adam Hatfield (United Kingdom) Adam Knight	(United Kingdom) Stewart Lines (United Kingdom) Ollie Taylor	(Republic of Ireland) Barry McMahon
1	R2	Sliverstone International		No. 55 JMH Automotive	No. 55 JMH Automotive	No. 55 JMH Automotive	No. 10 JMH Automotive	No. 70 Track Group Ltd	No. 234 Team ABBA Racing	No. 157 Derek McMahon Racing
1	R2	Sliverstone International		(United Kingdom) John Seale (United Kingdom) Marcus Clutton	(United Kingdom) John Seale (United Kingdom) Marcus Clutton	(United Kingdom) John Seale (United Kingdom) Marcus Clutton	(United Kingdom) Wayne Marrs (United Kingdom) Charlie Hollings	(United Kingdom) Marcus Jewell (United Kingdom) Lewis Plato	(United Kingdom) Richard Neary (United Kingdom) Sam Neary	(Republic of Ireland) Barry McMahon
2	R3	Silverstone GP	No. 84 VR Motorsport	No. 84 VR Motorsport	No. 84 VR Motorsport	No. 84 VR Motorsport	No. 28 SB Race Engineering	No. 991 Valluga Racing	No. 38 Geoff Steel Racing	No. 72 Whitebridge Motorsport
2	R3	Silverstone GP	(United Kingdom) Tim Gray (United Kingdom) Alistair Boulton	(United Kingdom) Tim Gray (United Kingdom) Alistair Boulton	(United Kingdom) Tim Gray (United Kingdom) Alistair Boulton	(United Kingdom) Tim Gray (United Kingdom) Alistair Boulton	(United Kingdom) Paul Bailey (United Kingdom) Andy Schultz	(United Kingdom) Adam Hadfield (United Kingdom) Ian Humphries	(United Kingdom) Sam Allpass	(United Kingdom) Chris Murphy
2	R4	Silverstone GP		No. 7 FF Corse	No. 10 JMH Automotive	No finishers	No. 10 JMH Automotive	No. 991 Valluga Racing	No. 234 Team ABBA Racing	No. 72 Whitebridge Motorsport
2	R4	Silverstone GP		(United Kingdom) David Mason (United Kingdom) Ross Wylie	(United Kingdom) Wayne Marrs (United Kingdom) Charlie Hollings	No finishers	(United Kingdom) Wayne Marrs (United Kingdom) Charlie Hollings	(United Kingdom) Adam Hatfield (United Kingdom) Ian Humphries	(United Kingdom) Richard Neary (United Kingdom) Sam Neary	(United Kingdom) Chris Murphy
3	R5	Brands Hatch Indy	No. 7 FF Corse	No. 7 FF Corse	No. 28 SB Race Engineering	No. 3 JPR Motorsport	No. 28 SB Race Engineering	No. 24 Simon Green Motorsport	No. 234 Team ABBA Racing	No entries
3	R5	Brands Hatch Indy	(United Kingdom) David Mason (United Kingdom) Ross Wylie	(United Kingdom) David Mason (United Kingdom) Ross Wylie	(United Kingdom) Paul Bailey (United Kingdom) Andy Schultz	(United Kingdom) Paul Rose	(United Kingdom) Paul Bailey (United Kingdom) Andy Schultz	(United Kingdom) Lee Frost	(United Kingdom) Richard Neary (United Kingdom) Sam Neary	No entries
3	R6	Brands Hatch Indy		No. 7 FF Corse	No. 28 SB Race Engineering	No. 84 VR Motorsport	No. 28 SB Race Engineering	No. 24 Simon Green Motorsport	No. 43 Butler Motorsport	No entries
3	R6	Brands Hatch Indy		(United Kingdom) David Mason (United Kingdom) Ross Wylie	(United Kingdom) Paul Bailey (United Kingdom) Andy Schultz	(United Kingdom) Alistair Boulton (United Kingdom) Grant Williams	(United Kingdom) Paul Bailey (United Kingdom) Andy Schultz	(United Kingdom) Lee Frost	(United Kingdom) Piers Reid	No entries
4	R7	Donington National	No. 84 VR Motorsport	No. 84 VR Motorsport	No. 8 MacG Racing	No. 8 MacG Racing	No. 28 SB Race Engineering	No. 32 SG Racing	No. 78 Maximum Motorsport	No. 49 Woodard Racing
4	R7	Donington National	(United Kingdom) Tim Gray (United Kingdom) Alistair Boulton	(United Kingdom) Tim Gray (United Kingdom) Alistair Boulton	(United Kingdom) Jonny MacGregor	(United Kingdom) Jonny MacGregor	(United Kingdom) Paul Bailey (United Kingdom) Andy Schultz	(United Kingdom) Mark Cunningham	(United Kingdom) Tim Docker	(United Kingdom) Daniel Woodard
4	R8	Donington National		No. 84 VR Motorsport	No. 84 VR Motorsport	No. 84 VR Motorsport	No. 65 ALP Racing	No. 77 RAW Motorsport	No. 92 Paul Calladine Motorsport	No finishers
4	R8	Donington National		(United Kingdom) Tim Gray (United Kingdom) Alistair Boulton	(United Kingdom) Tim Gray (United Kingdom) Alistair Boulton	(United Kingdom) Tim Gray (United Kingdom) Alistair Boulton	(United Kingdom) Alan Purbrick (United Kingdom) David Brise	(United Kingdom) Ben Dimmack (United Kingdom) Steve Burgess	(United Kingdom) Paul Calladine (United Kingdom) Graham Roberts	No finishers
5	R9	Oulton Park International	No. 28 SB Race Engineering	No. 29 Simon Green Motorsport	No. 28 SB Race Engineering	No. 84 VR Motorsport	No. 28 SB Race Engineering	No. 70 Track Group Ltd	No. 99 DAT Racing	No. 52 S2Smarts
5	R9	Oulton Park International	(United Kingdom) Paul Bailey (United Kingdom) Andy Schultz	(United Kingdom) Lee Frost (United Kingdom) Lucky Khera	(United Kingdom) Paul Bailey (United Kingdom) Andy Schultz	(United Kingdom) Tim Gray (United Kingdom) Alistair Boulton	(United Kingdom) Paul Bailey (United Kingdom) Andy Schultz	(United Kingdom) Marcus Jewell (United Kingdom) Ben Clucas	(United Kingdom) Guy Colclough (United Kingdom) Max Coates	(United Kingdom) Rob Baker
5	R10	Oulton Park International		No. 28 SB Race Engineering	No. 991 Valluga Racing	No. 4 JPR Motorsport	No. 28 SB Race Engineering	No. 991 Valluga Racing	No. 78 Maximum Motorsport	No. 52 S2Smarts
5	R10	Oulton Park International		(United Kingdom) Paul Bailey (United Kingdom) Andy Schultz	(United Kingdom) Ian Humphries	(United Kingdom) Steve Harris (United Kingdom) Chris Hart	(United Kingdom) Paul Bailey (United Kingdom) Andy Schulz	(United Kingdom) Ian Humphries	(United Kingdom) Tim Docker	(United Kingdom) Rob Baker
6	R11	Snetterton Circuit	No. 88 Team ABBA Racing	No. 88 Team ABBA Racing	No. 88 Team ABBA Racing	No. 88 Team ABBA Racing	No. 65 ALP Racing	No. 32 SG Racing	No. 74 Forelle Estates	No finishers
6	R11	Snetterton Circuit	(United Kingdom) Richard Neary (United Kingdom) Sam Neary	(United Kingdom) Richard Neary (United Kingdom) Sam Neary	(United Kingdom) Richard Neary (United Kingdom) Sam Neary	(United Kingdom) Richard Neary (United Kingdom) Sam Neary	(United Kingdom) Alan Purbrick (United Kingdom) David Brise	(United Kingdom) Mark Cunningham (United Kingdom) Peter Cunningham	(United Kingdom) Michael Price (United Kingdom) Marcus Clutton	No finishers
6	R12	Snetterton Circuit		No. 88 Team ABBA Racing	No. 88 Team ABBA Racing	No. 88 Team ABBA Racing	No. 28 SB Race Engineering	No. 32 SG Racing	No. 74 Forelle Estates	No. 52 S2Smarts
6	R12	Snetterton Circuit		(United Kingdom) Richard Neary (United Kingdom) Sam Neary	(United Kingdom) Richard Neary (United Kingdom) Sam Neary	(United Kingdom) Richard Neary (United Kingdom) Sam Neary	(United Kingdom) Paul Bailey (United Kingdom) Andy Schulz	(United Kingdom) Mark Cunningham (United Kingdom) Peter Cunningham	(United Kingdom) Michael Price (United Kingdom) Marcus Clutton	(United Kingdom) Rob Baker
7	R13	Oulton Park Island	No. 28 SB Race Engineering	No. 28 SB Race Engineering	No. 991 Valluga Racing	No. 4 JPR Motorsport	No. 18 Moss Motorsport	No. 991 Valluga Racing	No. 99 DAT Racing	No. 19 Matrix Motorsport
7	R13	Oulton Park Island	(United Kingdom) Paul Bailey (United Kingdom) Andy Schultz	(United Kingdom) Paul Bailey (United Kingdom) Andy Schultz	(United Kingdom) Ian Humphries	(United Kingdom) Steve Harris (United Kingdom) Chris Hart	(United Kingdom) Mike Moss (United Kingdom) Kevin Clarke	(United Kingdom) Ian Humphries	(United Kingdom) Guy Colclough (United Kingdom) Max Coates	(United Kingdom) Jeff Alden (United Kingdom) Rob Phillips
7	R14	Oulton Park Island		No. 4 JPR Motorsport	No. 4 JPR Motorsport	No. 4 JPR Motorsport	No. 18 Moss Motorsport	No. 991 Valluga Racing	No. 92 Paul Calldine Motorsport	No finishers
7	R14	Oulton Park Island		(United Kingdom) Steve Harris (United Kingdom) Chris Hart	(United Kingdom) Steve Harris (United Kingdom) Chris Hart	(United Kingdom) Steve Harris (United Kingdom) Chris Hart	(United Kingdom) Mike Moss (United Kingdom) Kevin Clarke	(United Kingdom) Ian Humphries	(United Kingdom) Paul Calladine (United Kingdom) Graham Roberts	No finishers
8	R15	Brands Hatch Indy	No. 5 Brabham Automotive	No. 5 Brabham Automotive	No. 5 Brabham Automotive	No. 5 Brabham Automotive	No. 18 Moss Motorsport	No. 58 Peter Bassill Racing	No. 78 Maximum Motorsport	No. 72 Whitebridge Motorsport
8	R15	Brands Hatch Indy	(Australia) David Brabham (United Kingdom) Will Powell	(Australia) David Brabham (United Kingdom) Will Powell	(Australia) David Brabham (United Kingdom) Will Powell	(Australia) David Brabham (United Kingdom) Will Powell	(United Kingdom) Mike Moss (United Kingdom) Ollie Hancock	(United Kingdom) Peter Bassill (United Kingdom) Emily Linscott	(United Kingdom) Tim Docker	(United Kingdom) Chris Murphy
8	R16	Brands Hatch Indy		No. 84 VR Motorsport	No. 18 Moss Motorsport	No. 84 VR Motorsport	No. 18 Moss Motorsport	No. 58 Peter Bassill Racing	No. 95 Maximum Motorsport	No. 52 S2Smarts
8	R16	Brands Hatch Indy		(United Kingdom) Tim Gray	(United Kingdom) Mike Moss (United Kingdom) Ollie Hancock	(United Kingdom) Tim Gray	(United Kingdom) Mike Moss (United Kingdom) Ollie Hancock	(United Kingdom) Peter Bassill (United Kingdom) Emily Linscott	(United Kingdom) Nick Halstead (United Kingdom) Jamie Stanley	(United Kingdom) Rob Baker (United Kingdom) David Farrow

=== Overall championship standings ===
Points are awarded as follows in all classes:

System	1st	2nd	3rd	4th	5th	6th	7th	8th	9th	10th	11th	12th	13th	14th	15th	16th	PP	FL
+3	30	25	20	17	14	12	10	9	8	7	6	5	4	3	2	1	1	1

System	1st	2nd	3rd	PP	FL
-3	20	15	10	1	1

(key)

Pos.	Drivers	No.	Class	SIL		SIL		BRH		DON		OUL		SNE		OUL		BRH		Pts
1	(United Kingdom) Paul Bailey (United Kingdom) Andy Schultz	28	2	6	5	2	2	1	1	4	Ret	**1**	3	7	2	**7**	3	5	6	401
2	(United Kingdom) Tim Docker	78	4	17	13	12	9	10	8	8	8	8	6	10	8	8	10	7	8	367
3	(United Kingdom) Mark Cunningham	32	3	15	11	8	7	NC	6	5	6	12	5	4	6	9	8			311
3	(United Kingdom) Peter Cunningham	32	3	15	11	8	7	NC	6			12	5	4	6	9	8			311
4	(United Kingdom) Tim Gray	84	1	1	Ret	**1**	Ret			**2**	1	2	8			Ret	DNS	11	2	239
4	(United Kingdom) Alistair Boulton	84	1			**1**	Ret	Ret	7	**2**	1			**Ret**	DNS					239
4	(Wales) Grant Williams	84	1					Ret	7			2	8	**Ret**	DNS					239
5	(United Kingdom) Graham Roberts	92	4	Ret	Ret	16	10	Ret	5	10	7			12	11	6	7			236
5	(United Kingdom) Paul Calladine	92	4	Ret	Ret	16	10			10	7	16	9	12	11	6	7			236
6	(United Kingdom) Adam Hatfield	991	3	8	8	7	5													215
6	(United Kingdom) Adam Knight	991	3	8	8															215
6	(United Kingdom) Ian Humphries	991	3			7	5			Ret	DNS	5	1			1	4			215
6	(United Kingdom) Benji Hetherington	991	3							Ret	DNS									215
7	(United Kingdom) Alan Purbrick	65	2	Ret	Ret	4	DNS	Ret	DNS	7	12	Ret	11	3	3	14	5	8	Ret	207
7	(United Kingdom) David Brise	65	2	Ret	Ret	4	DNS	Ret	DNS	7	12			3	3	14	5	8	Ret	207
8	(United Kingdom) Steve Harris	4	1	7	Ret	9	NC			16	5	3	4	Ret	Ret	3	1			188
8	(United Kingdom) Chris Hart	4	1			9	NC					3	4	Ret	Ret	3	1			188
8	(United Kingdom) Paul Rose	4	1							DNS	5									188
9	(United Kingdom) Guy Colclough	99	4	18	15	19	13			9	9	7	Ret			7	11			180
9	(United Kingdom) Max Coates	99	4	18	15					9	9	7	Ret			7	11			180
10	(United Kingdom) Mike Moss	18	2	Ret	DNS			Ret	DNS			6	14			2	2	**3**	1	168
10	(United Kingdom) Rob Gilham	18	2	Ret	DNS															168
10	(United Kingdom) Charles Lamb	18	2					Ret	DNS											168
10	(United Kingdom) Kevin Clarke	18	2									6	14			2	2			168
10	(United Kingdom) Ollie Hancock	18	2															**3**	1	168
11	(United Kingdom) Jonny MacGregor	8	1	3	9	6	Ret			1	3			8	Ret					153
11	(United Kingdom) Ben Sharich	8	1	3	9	6	Ret							8	Ret					153
12	(United Kingdom) David Mason (United Kingdom) Ross Wylie	7	2	11	6	5	3	**5**	12	Ret	DNS									148
13	(United Kingdom) Chris Murphy	72	5	27	21	21	16											10	Ret	145
14	(United Kingdom) Michael Price	74	4							11	10	9	7	9	5					143
14	(United Kingdom) Peter Ecreg	74	4							11	10									143
14	(United Kingdom) Simon Clarke	74	4									9	7							143
14	(United Kingdom) Marcus Clutton	74	4											9	5					143
15	(United Kingdom) Ben Dimmack (United Kingdom) Steve Burgess	77	3					Ret	3	6	4			5	7	NC	DNS			133
16	(United Kingdom) Rob Baker	52	5	26	Ret	DNS	DNS			DNS	DNS	15	13	Ret	12			13	10	121
16	(United Kingdom) Lucas Nanetti	52	5	26	Ret	DNS	DNS													121
16	(United Kingdom) David Farrow	52	5															13	10	121
17	(United Kingdom) Marcus Jewell	70	3	9	7							4	2							116
17	(United Kingdom) Lewis Plato	70	3	9	7															116
17	(United Kingdom) Ben Clucas	70	3									4	2							116
18	(United Kingdom) Wayne Marrs (United Kingdom) Charlie Hollings	10	2	4	4	3	1													115
19	(United Kingdom) Peter Bassill (United Kingdom) Emily Linscott	58	3									11	10	11	9	DNS	DNS	6	4	110
20	(United Kingdom) Lee Frost	24/98 (Note: Lee Frost drove on his own at Brands Hatch running the number 24 at Round 3, he was partnered by Lucky Khera in the same car for Round 7 but numbered 98.)	3					6	2							4	9			105
20	(United Kingdom) Lucky Khera	24/98	3													4	9			105
21	(United Kingdom) Paul Rose	3	1	Ret	Ret	Ret	Ret	2	13	Ret	DNS	Ret	16	2	Ret	11	Ret			100
21	(United Kingdom) Kristian Rose	3	1											2	Ret	11	Ret			100
22	(United Kingdom) Richard Neary (United Kingdom) Sam Neary	234	4	Ret	12	Ret	4	3	Ret											97
23	(United Kingdom) Ashley Woodman (United Kingdom) Martin Byford	60	4	19	18	13	14	4	Ret	Ret	Ret	14	DNS							95
24	(United Kingdom) Moh Ritson	26	4	25	16	18	12	NC	11	12	11	Ret	Ret	Ret	DNS					90
24	(United Kingdom) Sarah Moore	26	4	25	16	18	12	NC	11	12	11	Ret	Ret							90
24	(United Kingdom) Edward Moore	26	4											Ret	DNS					90
25	(United Kingdom) Sam Allpass	38	4	13	14	10	11	DNS	DNS											89
26	(United Kingdom) Stewart Lines (United Kingdom) Ollie Taylor	95	4	12	17															87
26	(United Kingdom) Nick Halstead (United Kingdom) Jamie Stanley	95	4															NC	7	87
27	(United Kingdom) Chris Bentley	35	4	21	Ret	14	8	9	9											86
27	(United Kingdom) John Clonis	35	4	21	Ret															86
27	(United Kingdom) Rob Gilham	35	4			14	8	9	9											86
28	(United Kingdom) Andrew Stewart	15	5	29	22	22	17													86
29	(United Kingdom) Lucky Khera (United Kingdom) Lee Frost	29	1	14	2					3	2	Ret	DNS							84
30	(United Kingdom) Martyn Compton (United Kingdom) Warren McKinlay	68	4	22	23	15	NC	7	10	13	Ret									76
30	(United Kingdom) Jon-Allan Butterworth	68	4	22	23															76
31	(Republic of Ireland) Barry McMahon	157	5	23	20															63
32	(United Kingdom) John Seale (United Kingdom) Marcus Clutton	55	1	**2**	1															58
33	(Republic of Ireland) Arthur McMahon	45	5	28	Ret	23	18													58
34	(United Kingdom) Marcus Fothergill (New Zealand) Dave Benett	69	4	16	19	17	15					Ret	DNS							57
35	(United Kingdom) Piers Reid	43	4	20	Ret			8	4	DNS	DNS									57
36	(United Kingdom) Rick Nevinson (United Kingdom) Brad Nevinson	17	4									13	12			DNS	13			51
37	(United Kingdom) Ian Lawson (United Kingdom) Ryan Lindsay (United Kingdom) Kevin Clarke	46	1	5	3															37
38	(United Kingdom) Jasver Sapra	40	4	24	DNS													12	DNS	32
39	(United Kingdom) Ben Dimmack (United Kingdom) Steve Burgess	77	2			11	6													31
40	(United Kingdom) George Agyeton	42	4			Ret	NC											DNS	Ret	25
41	(United Kingdom) Daniel Woodard	49	5							15	Ret									22
42	(United Kingdom) Steve Rothery (United Kingdom) Chris Whiteman	14	4							14	13									22
43	(United Kingdom) Mike Moss (United Kingdom) Charles Lamb	57	4			20	DNS													7
–	(United Kingdom) Stuart Wilson	13	2	Ret	DNS	Ret	DNS													0
–	(United Kingdom) Will Alterman	13	2	Ret	DNS															0
–	(United Kingdom) Sean Cooper	13	2			Ret	DNS													0
–	(Republic of Ireland) Barry McMahon	157	4			Ret	DNS													0
–	(United Kingdom) Lucky Khera	24	3					Ret	DNS											0
–	(United Kingdom) Simon Baker	39	4	DNS	DNS															0
drivers ineligible for points
–	(United Kingdom) Richard Neary (United Kingdom) Sam Neary	88	1Inv											**1**	1					0
–	(United Kingdom) Richard Neary (United Kingdom) Sam Neary	334	3Inv													**Ret**	DNS			0
–	(Australia) David Brabham (United Kingdom) Will Powell	5	1Inv															**1**	Ret	0
–	(United Kingdom) Lucky Khera (United Kingdom) Lee Frost	98	2Inv															2	5	0
–	(United Kingdom) Kevin Clarke	46	4Inv									10	DNS					4	3	0
–	(United Kingdom) Sam Tomlinson (United Kingdom) Will Stacey	101	3Inv											6	4					0
–	(United Kingdom) Alistair Boulton (United Kingdom) Jack Fabby	96	1Inv													13	6			0
–	(United Kingdom) Nick Scott-Dickeson (United Kingdom) Steven Chandler	35	3Inv															9	11	0
–	(United Kingdom) Michael Epps (United Kingdom) Ben Claydon	37	3Inv															Ret	9	0
–	(United Kingdom) Mark Murfitt (United Kingdom) Michael Broadhurst	77	4Inv	10	10															0
–	(United Kingdom) Steve Walton	8	2Inv													10	12			0
–	(United Kingdom) Ruaridh Clark (United Kingdom) Jeff Clark	96	4Inv											Ret	10					0
–	(United Kingdom) Jeff Alden (United Kingdom) Rob Phillips	19	5Inv													12	Ret			0
Pos.	Driver	No.	Class	SIL		SIL		BRH		DON		OUL		SNE		OUL		BRH		Pts

Key
Colour	Result
Gold	Winner
Silver	Second place
Bronze	Third place
Green	Other points position
Blue	Other classified position
Blue	Not classified, finished (NC)
Purple	Not classified, retired (Ret)
Red	Did not qualify (DNQ)
Red	Did not pre-qualify (DNPQ)
Black	Disqualified (DSQ)
White	Did not start (DNS)
White	Race cancelled (C)
Blank	Did not practice (DNP)
Blank	Excluded (EX)
Blank	Did not arrive (DNA)
Blank	Withdrawn (WD)
Blank	Did not enter (cell empty)
Text formatting	Meaning
**Bold**	Pole position
Italics	Fastest lap

=== Class championship standings ===
Points are awarded as follows in all classes

System	1st	2nd	3rd	4th	5th	6th	7th	8th	9th	10th	11th	12th	13th	14th	15th	16th	PP	FL
+3	30	25	20	17	14	12	10	9	8	7	6	5	4	3	2	1	1	1

System	1st	2nd	3rd	PP	FL
-3	20	15	10	1	1

(key)

Pos.	Drivers	No.	SIL		SIL		BRH		DON		OUL		SNE		OUL		BRH		Pts
Class 1
1	(United Kingdom) Tim Gray	84	1	Ret	**1**	Ret			**2**	1	2	8			Ret	DNS	**11**	2	239
1	(United Kingdom) Alistair Boulton	84			**1**	Ret	**Ret**	7	**2**	1			**Ret**	DNS					239
1	(Wales) Grant Williams	84					**Ret**	7			2	8	**Ret**	DNS					239
2	(United Kingdom) Steve Harris	4	7	Ret	9	NC			16	5	3	4	Ret	Ret	**3**	1			188
2	(United Kingdom) Chris Hart	4			9	NC					3	4	Ret	Ret	**3**	1			188
2	(United Kingdom) Paul Rose	4							DNS	5									188
3	(United Kingdom) Jonny MacGregor	8	3	9	6	Ret			1	3			8	Ret					153
3	(United Kingdom) Ben Sharich	8	3	9	6	Ret							8	Ret					153
4	(United Kingdom) Paul Rose	3	Ret	Ret	Ret	Ret	2	13	Ret	DNS	Ret	16	2	Ret	11	Ret			100
4	(United Kingdom) Kristian Rose	3											2	Ret	11	Ret			100
5	(United Kingdom) Lucky Khera (United Kingdom) Lee Frost	29	14	2					3	2	**Ret**	DNS							84
6	(United Kingdom) John Seale (United Kingdom) Marcus Clutton	55	**2**	1															58
7	(United Kingdom) Ian Lawson (United Kingdom) Ryan Lindsay (United Kingdom) Kevin Clarke	46	5	3															37
drivers ineligible for points
–	(United Kingdom) Richard Neary (United Kingdom) Sam Neary	88											**1**	1					0
–	(Australia) David Brabham (United Kingdom) Will Powell	5															**1**	Ret	0
–	(United Kingdom) Alistair Boulton (United Kingdom) Jack Fabby	96													**13**	6			0
Class 2
1	(United Kingdom) Paul Bailey (United Kingdom) Andy Schultz	28	6	5	2	2	1	1	4	Ret	**1**	3	**7**	2	**7**	3	5	6	401
2	(United Kingdom) Alan Purbrick	65	Ret	Ret	4	Ret	Ret	DNS	7	12	Ret	11	3	3	14	5	8	Ret	207
2	(United Kingdom) David Brise	65	Ret	Ret	4	Ret	Ret	DNS	7	12			3	3	14	5	8	Ret	207
3	(United Kingdom) Mike Moss	18	Ret	DNS			Ret	DNS			6	14			2	2	**3**	1	168
3	(United Kingdom) Rob Gilham	18	Ret	DNS															168
3	(United Kingdom) Charles Lamb	18					Ret	DNS											168
3	(United Kingdom) Kevin Clarke	18									6	14			2	2			168
3	(United Kingdom) Ollie Hancock	18															**3**	1	168
4	(United Kingdom) David Mason (United Kingdom) Ross Wylie	7	**11**	6	**5**	3	**5**	12	**Ret**	DNS									148
5	(United Kingdom) Wayne Marrs (United Kingdom) Charlie Hollings	10	4	4	3	1													115
6	(United Kingdom) Ben Dimmack (United Kingdom) Steve Burgess	77			11	6													31
–	(United Kingdom) Stuart Wilson	13	Ret	DNS	Ret	DNS													0
–	(United Kingdom) Will Alterman	13	Ret	DNS															0
–	(United Kingdom) Sean Cooper	13			Ret	DNS													0
drivers ineligible for points
–	(United Kingdom) Lucky Khera (United Kingdom) Lee Frost	98															2	5	0
–	(United Kingdom) Steve Walton	8													10	12			0
Class 3
1	(United Kingdom) Mark Cunningham	32	15	11	8	7	**NC**	6	**5**	6	12	5	4	6	9	8			311
1	(United Kingdom) Peter Cunningham	32	15	11	8	7	**NC**	6			12	5	4	6	9	8			311
2	(United Kingdom) Adam Hatfield	991	8	8	**7**	5													215
2	(United Kingdom) Adam Knight	991	8	8															215
2	(United Kingdom) Ian Humphries	991			**7**	5			Ret	DNS	5	1			**1**	4			215
2	(United Kingdom) Benji Hetherington	991							Ret	DNS									215
3	(United Kingdom) Ben Dimmack (United Kingdom) Steve Burgess	77					Ret	3	6	4			**5**	7	NC	DNS			133
4	(United Kingdom) Marcus Jewell	70	**9**	7							**4**	2							116
4	(United Kingdom) Lewis Plato	70	**9**	7															116
4	(United Kingdom) Ben Clucas	70									**4**	2							116
5	(United Kingdom) Peter Bassill (United Kingdom) Emily Linscott	58									11	10	11	9	DNS	DNS	**6**	4	110
6	(United Kingdom) Lee Frost	24/98					6	2							4	9			105
6	(United Kingdom) Lucky Khera	24/98													4	9			105
–	(United Kingdom) Lucky Khera	24					Ret	DNS											0
drivers ineligible for points
–	(United Kingdom) Sam Tomlinson (United Kingdom) Will Stacey	101											**6**	4					0
–	(United Kingdom) Nick Scott-Dickeson (United Kingdom) Steven Chandler	35															9	11	0
–	(United Kingdom) Michael Epps (United Kingdom) Ben Claydon	37															**Ret**	9	0
–	(United Kingdom) Richard Neary (United Kingdom) Sam Neary	334													**Ret**	DNS			0
Class 4
1	(United Kingdom) Tim Docker	78	17	13	12	9	10	8	8	8	8	6	10	8	8	10	7	8	367
2	(United Kingdom) Graham Roberts	92	Ret	Ret	16	10	Ret	5	10	7			12	11	6	7			236
2	(United Kingdom) Paul Calladine	92	Ret	Ret	16	10			10	7	16	9	12	11	6	7			236
3	(United Kingdom) Guy Colclough	99	18	15	19	13			**9**	9	**7**	Ret			**7**	11			180
3	(United Kingdom) Max Coates	99	18	15					**9**	9	**7**	Ret			**7**	11			180
4	(United Kingdom) Michael Price	74							11	10	9	7	**9**	5					143
4	(United Kingdom) Peter Ecreg	74							11	10									143
4	(United Kingdom) Simon Clarke	74									9	7							143
4	(United Kingdom) Marcus Clutton	74											**9**	5					143
5	(United Kingdom) Richard Neary (United Kingdom) Sam Neary	234	Ret	12	**Ret**	4	**3**	Ret											97
6	(United Kingdom) Ashley Woodman (United Kingdom) Martin Byford	60	19	18	13	14	4	Ret	Ret	Ret	14	DNS							95
7	(United Kingdom) Moh Ritson	26	25	16	18	12	NC	11	12	11	Ret	Ret	Ret	DNS					90
7	(United Kingdom) Sarah Moore	26	25	16	18	12	NC	11	12	11	Ret	Ret							90
7	(United Kingdom) Edward Moore	26											Ret	DNS					90
8	(United Kingdom) Sam Allpass	38	13	14	10	11	DNS	DNS											89
9	(United Kingdom) Stewart Lines (United Kingdom) Ollie Taylor	95	**12**	17															87
9	(United Kingdom) Jamie Stanley (United Kingdom) Nick Halstead	95															**NC**	7	87
10	(United Kingdom) Chris Bentley	35	21	Ret	14	8	9	9											86
10	(United Kingdom) John Clonis	35	21	Ret															86
10	(United Kingdom) Rob Gilham	35			14	8	9	9											86
11	(United Kingdom) Martyn Compton (United Kingdom) Warren McKinlay	68	22	23	15	NC	7	10	13	Ret									76
11	(United Kingdom) Jon-Allan Butterworth	68	22	23															76
12	(United Kingdom) Marcus Fothergill (New Zealand) Dave Benett	69	16	19	17	15					Ret	DNS							57
13	(United Kingdom) Piers Reid	43	20	Ret			8	4	DNS	DNS									57
14	(United Kingdom) Rick Nevinson (United Kingdom) Brad Nevinson	17									13	12			DNS	13			51
15	(United Kingdom) Jasver Sapra	40	24	DNS													12	DNS	32
16	(United Kingdom) George Agyeton	42			Ret	NC											DNS	Ret	25
17	(United Kingdom) Steve Rothery (United Kingdom) Chris Whiteman	14							14	13							DNS	DNS	22
18	(United Kingdom) Mike Moss (United Kingdom) Charles Lamb	57			20	DNS													7
–	(Republic of Ireland) Barry McMahon	157			Ret	DNS													0
–	(United Kingdom) Simon Baker	39	DNS	DNS															0
drivers ineligible for points
–	(United Kingdom) Kevin Clarke	46									10	DNS					4	3	0
–	(United Kingdom) Mark Murfitt (United Kingdom) Michael Broadhurst	77	**10**	10															0
–	(United Kingdom) Ruaridh Clark (United Kingdom) Jeff Clark	96											Ret	10					0
Class 5
1	(United Kingdom) Chris Murphy	72	27	21	21	16											**10**	Ret	145
2	(United Kingdom) Rob Baker	52	26	Ret	DNS	DNS			DNS	DNS	**15**	13	**Ret**	12			13	10	121
2	(United Kingdom) Lucas Nanetti	52	26	Ret	DNS	DNS													121
2	(United Kingdom) David Farrow	52															13	10	121
3	(United Kingdom) Andrew Stewart	15	29	22	**22**	17													86
4	(Republic of Ireland) Barry McMahon	157	**23**	20															63
5	(Republic of Ireland) Arthur McMahon	45	28	Ret	23	18													58
6	(United Kingdom) Daniel Woodard	49							**15**	Ret									22
drivers ineligible for points
–	(United Kingdom) Jeff Alden (United Kingdom) Rob Phillips	19													**12**	Ret			0
Pos.	Driver	No.	SIL		SIL		BRH		DON		OUL		SNE		OUL		BRH		Pts

Key
Colour	Result
Gold	Winner
Silver	Second place
Bronze	Third place
Green	Other points position
Blue	Other classified position
Blue	Not classified, finished (NC)
Purple	Not classified, retired (Ret)
Red	Did not qualify (DNQ)
Red	Did not pre-qualify (DNPQ)
Black	Disqualified (DSQ)
White	Did not start (DNS)
White	Race cancelled (C)
Blank	Did not practice (DNP)
Blank	Excluded (EX)
Blank	Did not arrive (DNA)
Blank	Withdrawn (WD)
Blank	Did not enter (cell empty)
Text formatting	Meaning
**Bold**	Pole position
Italics	Fastest lap
