= FF Corse =

British motorsport team

(United Kingdom) FF Corse
- Founded: 2009
- Base: Silverstone Circuit
- Founder(s): Anthony Cheshire
- Website: https://www.ffcorse.com

FF Corse (Note: Stylised as f.f. Corse.) is a British motorsport team based at Silverstone Circuit.

== History ==
The team was founded in 2009 by Anthony Cheshire. FF Corse specialises in Ferrari racing cars and competes in a number of the marque's Ferrari Challenge programmes. As of 2015, the team manages around 35 Ferrari race cars.

The team has previously competed in British GT Championship, GT Open, Le Mans Cup, GT Cup Championship, Britcar Endurance Championship and Ferrari Challenge. FF Corse is three-time Ferrari World Final Champions.

Notable drivers include Johnny Mowlem, Adam Carroll, Mike Wilds, Bruno Senna, Tom Ingram, and Tom Fleming.

In 2024, FF Corse announced its GT Driver Academy, supporting up and coming racers to develop their careers into GT car racing. The team also stated its intentions to return to the British GT Championship having purchased a Ferrari 296 GT3, expected for delivery late 2024.

== Racing record ==
=== British GT Championship results ===
Circuit	Car	Drivers	Class	Position
2012
(United Kingdom) Snetterton Circuit	Ferrari 458 Challenge	(United Kingdom) Ryan Hooker (United Kingdom) Gary Eastwood	GTC	1st
(United Kingdom) Silverstone	Ferrari 458 Challenge	(United Kingdom) Ryan Hooker (United Kingdom) Gary Eastwood	GTC	1st
(United Kingdom) Donington Park	Ferrari 458 Challenge	(United Kingdom) Ryan Hooker (United Kingdom) Gary Eastwood	GTC	1st
2013
(United Kingdom) Oulton Park	Ferrari 458 GT3	(United Kingdom) Rob Barff (United Kingdom) Gary Eastwood	GT3	7th
(United Kingdom) Rockingham Motor Speedway	Ferrari 458 GT3	(United Kingdom) Rob Barff (United Kingdom) Gary Eastwood	GT3	5th
(United Kingdom) Silverstone	Ferrari 458 GT3	(United Kingdom) Rob Barff (United Kingdom) Gary Eastwood	GT3	12th
(United Kingdom) Silverstone	Ferrari 458 Challenge	(Belgium) Jacques Duyver (United Kingdom) Charlie Hollings	GTC	1st
(United Kingdom) Silverstone	Ferrari 458 GT3	(United Kingdom) Jamie Stanley (United Kingdom) Paul McNeilly	GT3	12th
(United Kingdom) Snetterton Circuit	Ferrari 458 GT3	(United Kingdom) Rob Barff (United Kingdom) Gary Eastwood	GT3	13th
(United Kingdom) Brands Hatch	Ferrari 458 GT3	(United Kingdom) Rob Barff (United Kingdom) Gary Eastwood	GT3	DNF
(United Kingdom) Brands Hatch	Ferrari 458 Challenge	(Belgium) Jacques Duyver (United Kingdom) Charlie Hollings	GTC	1st
(Netherlands) Zandvoort	Ferrari 458 GT3	(United Kingdom) Rob Barff (United Kingdom) Gary Eastwood	GT3	1st
(United Kingdom) Donington Park	Ferrari 458 GT3	(United Kingdom) Rob Barff (United Kingdom) Gary Eastwood	GT3	2nd
2014
(United Kingdom) Oulton Park	Ferrari 458 GT3	(United Kingdom) Rob Barff (United Kingdom) Gary Eastwood	GT3	DNF
(United Kingdom) Rockingham Motor Speedway	Ferrari 458 GT3	(United Kingdom) Rob Barff (United Kingdom) Gary Eastwood	GT3	1st
(United Kingdom) Silverstone	Ferrari 458 GT3	(United Kingdom) Jamie Stanley (United Kingdom) Paul McNeilly	GT3	DNF
(United Kingdom) Snetterton Circuit	Ferrari 458 GT3	(United Kingdom) Adam Carroll (United Kingdom) Gary Eastwood	GT3	DNF
(Belgium) Spa Francorchamps	Ferrari 458 GT3	(United Kingdom) Adam Carroll (United Kingdom) Gary Eastwood	GT3	18th
(United Kingdom) Donington Park	Ferrari 458 GT3	(United Kingdom) Ollie Hancock (United Kingdom) Gary Eastwood	GT3	2nd
(United Kingdom) Donington Park	Ferrari 458 GT3	(United Kingdom) Piers Johnson (United Kingdom) Ron Johnson	GT3	13th
2015
(United Kingdom) Oulton Park	Ferrari 458 GT3	(United Kingdom) Adam Carroll (United Kingdom) Gary Eastwood	GT3	5th
(United Kingdom) Rockingham Motor Speedway	Ferrari 458 GT3	(United Kingdom) Adam Carroll (United Kingdom) Gary Eastwood	GT3	DNF
(United Kingdom) Silverstone	Ferrari 458 GT3	(United Kingdom) Michael Lyons (United Kingdom) Gary Eastwood	GT3	DNF
(Belgium) Spa Francorchamps	Ferrari 458 GT3	(United Kingdom) Ollie Hancock (United Kingdom) Gary Eastwood	GT3	10th
(United Kingdom) Brands Hatch	Ferrari 458 GT3	(United Kingdom) Adam Carroll (United Kingdom) Gary Eastwood	GT3	5th
(United Kingdom) Snetterton Circuit	Ferrari 458 GT3	(United Kingdom) Adam Carroll (United Kingdom) Gary Eastwood	GT3	DNF
2016
(United Kingdom) Silverstone	Ferrari 488 GT3	(United Kingdom) Adam Carroll (United Kingdom) Marco Attard	GT3	3rd
2020
(United Kingdom) Silverstone	Ferrari 488 Challenge Evo	(Belgium) Laurent De Meeus	GTC	2nd
(Belgium) Spa Francorchamps	Ferrari 488 Challenge Evo	(United Kingdom) Omar Jackson (United Kingdom) Charlie Hollings	GTC	DNS

=== Ferrari Challenge results ===
2013
Driver	Car	Class	(Italy) MNZ		(Czech Republic) BRN		(France) LMS	(Portugal) ALG		(Germany) HOC		(Italy) IMO		(Italy) MUG				
Driver	Car	Class	R1	R2	R1	R2	R	R1	R2	R1	R2	R1	R2	R1	R2	FM		
(United Kingdom) Alex Martin	Ferrari 458 Challenge	Trofeo Pirelli	4	5	3	5	2	3	5	3	5	Ret	4	6	2	5		
(United Kingdom) Sam Smeeth	Ferrari 458 Challenge	Trofeo Pirelli												3	7			
(Belgium) Jacques Duyver	Ferrari 458 Challenge	Trofeo Pirelli					6					6	8					
(United Kingdom) Rupert Martin	Ferrari 458 Challenge	Coppa Shell	10	9	10	Ret	19	12	7	9	Ret			12	5	Ret		
2014
Driver	Car	Class	(Italy) MNZ		(Italy) MUG		(Czech Republic) BRN		(Portugal) ALG		(United Kingdom) SIL		(Turkey) IST		(United Arab Emirates) YAS			
Driver	Car	Class	R1	R2	R1	R2	R1	R2	R1	R2	R1	R2	R1	R2	R1	R2	FM	
(United Kingdom) Sam Smeeth	Ferrari 458 Challenge	Trofeo Pirelli Pro-Am	4	1							4	1						
(United Kingdom) Alex Martin	Ferrari 458 Challenge	Trofeo Pirelli Pro-Am	5	Ret	3	4	1	4	2	3	4	1	4	4	4	4	3	
(Belgium) Jacques Duyver	Ferrari 458 Challenge	Coppa Shell	3	8	4	5	2	2	2	Ret	2	2	2	1	5	Ret	3	
(United Kingdom) Rupert Martin	Ferrari 458 Challenge	Coppa Shell AM			Ret		4	4	5	5	5	5	4	4	Ret	11	10	
2016
Driver	Car	Class	(Spain) VAL		(Italy) MUG		(France) LMS	(Russia) SOC		(Germany) HOC		(Spain) JER		(United States) DAY				
Driver	Car	Class	R1	R2	R1	R2	R	R1	R2	R1	R2	R1	R2	R1	R2	FM		
(United Kingdom) Sam Smeeth	Ferrari 458 Challenge	Trofeo Pirelli Pro	2	1	1	1	1	2	5	1	1	1	1	1	1	1		1st
(Belgium) Jacques Duyver	Ferrari 458 Challenge	Trofeo Pirelli Pro												6	5			16th
(United Kingdom) Wayne Marrs	Ferrari 458 Challenge	Coppa Shell AM	6	10	17	19	12											20th
2017
Driver	Car	Class	(Spain) VAL		(Italy) MNZ		(Hungary) BUD		(France) LEC		(United Kingdom) SIL		(Italy) IMO		(Italy) MUG			
Driver	Car	Class	R1	R2	R1	R2	R1	R2	R1	R2	R1	R2	R1	R2	R1	R2	FM	
(United Kingdom) Sam Smeeth	Ferrari 488 Challenge	Trofeo Pirelli Pro	4	6	2	5	2	5	4	3	5	5	2	1	5	4		2nd
(United Kingdom) Chris Froggatt	Ferrari 488 Challenge	Trofeo Pirelli Pro-Am	2	2	Ret	6	9	1	2	2	1	1	2	3	Ret	2		3rd
(United Kingdom) Bonamy Grimes	Ferrari 488 Challenge	Trofeo Pirelli Pro-Am									6	4	4	4	8	4		8th
(United Kingdom) Marc Brough	Ferrari 488 Challenge	Trofeo Pirelli Pro-Am	5	7	Ret	5							3	9	10	8		9th
(Belgium) Laurent de Meeus	Ferrari 488 Challenge	Coppa Shell AM									15	12	14	21	18	18		25th
2018
Driver	Car	Class	(Italy) MUG		(United Kingdom) SIL		(Belgium) SPA		(Italy) MIS		(Czech Republic) BRN		(Spain) BAR		(Italy) MNZ			
Driver	Car	Class	R1	R2	R1	R2	R1	R2	R1	R2	R1	R2	R1	R2	R1	R2	FM	
(United Kingdom) Sam Smeeth	Ferrari 488 Challenge	Trofeo Pirelli Pro	7	7	4	4									7	6		8th
(United Kingdom) Chris Froggatt	Ferrari 488 Challenge	Trofeo Pirelli Pro-Am	1	2	1	1	1	4	2	2	1	1	1	1	1	1		1st
(United Kingdom) John Sawbridge	Ferrari 488 Challenge	Trofeo Pirelli Pro-Am	6	5	5	7	2	3	6	5	5	6	Ret	6				5th
(United Kingdom) Jack Brown	Ferrari 488 Challenge	Trofeo Pirelli Pro-Am			2	3							2	Ret	2	2		7th
(United Kingdom) John Dhillon	Ferrari 488 Challenge	Trofeo Pirelli Pro-Am	9	9	7	8	5	Ret	5	Ret	6	Ret	6	7	4	4		8th
(United Kingdom) Pantelis Christoforou	Ferrari 488 Challenge	Trofeo Pirelli Pro-Am			8	9	4	Ret					7	8				11th
(Belgium) Laurent de Meeus	Ferrari 488 Challenge	Coppa Shell AM	7	5	Ret	DNS	5	5	8	DNS	6	7			1	5		7th
2019
Driver	Car	Class	(Bahrain) BHR		(Spain) VAL		(Austria) SPE		(France) LMS	(Germany) NÜR		(Italy) IMO		(Italy) MUG				
Driver	Car	Class	R1	R2	R1	R2	R1	R2	R1	R1	R2	R1	R2	R1	R2	FM		
(United Kingdom) Sam Smeeth	Ferrari 488 Challenge	Trofeo Pirelli Pro	2	4	1	6	5	C	3	3	7	3	5	3	5			3rd
(United Kingdom) Adam Carroll	Ferrari 488 Challenge	Trofeo Pirelli Pro					1	C	1	7	3	4	4	1	3			5th
(United Kingdom) Chris Froggatt	Ferrari 488 Challenge	Trofeo Pirelli Pro					4	C	Ret					7	8			10th
(United Kingdom) Jack Brown	Ferrari 488 Challenge	Trofeo Pirelli Pro-Am	2	2	3	1	1	C	3	6	2	9	2					2nd
(United Kingdom) John Dhillon	Ferrari 488 Challenge	Trofeo Pirelli Pro-Am	4	6	10	Ret	5	C	11	7	6	8	Ret					10th
(United Kingdom) Franck Ruimy	Ferrari 488 Challenge	Trofeo Pirelli Pro-Am	9	10	Ret	5			12	8	8			9	7			11th
(United Kingdom) Ali Kamyab	Ferrari 488 Challenge	Trofeo Pirelli Pro-Am	6	7	11	8												14th
(Belgium) Laurent de Meeus	Ferrari 488 Challenge	Coppa Shell AM	2	3	4	2	7	2	1	10	Ret	9	3	5	5			2nd
2020
Driver	Car	Class	(Italy) IMO		(Spain) BCN		(Portugal) ALG		(Italy) MUG		(Belgium) SPA		(Italy) MIS1		(Italy) MIS2			
Driver	Car	Class	R1	R2	R1	R2	R1	R2	R1	R2	R1	R2	R1	R2	R1	R2	FM	
(Belgium) Laurent de Meeus	Ferrari 488 Challenge Evo	Coppa Shell AM	5	2	6	2	7	2			Ret	2	1	Ret				4th
2021
Driver	Car	Class	(Italy) MNZ		(Austria) RBR		(Czech Republic) BRN		(Spain) VAL		(Germany) NÜR		(Belgium) SPA		(Italy) MUG			
Driver	Car	Class	R1	R2	R1	R2	R1	R2	R1	R2	R1	R2	R1	R2	R1	R2	FM	
(United Kingdom) Omar Jackson	Ferrari 488 Challenge Evo	Trofeo Pirelli Pro-Am	11	7	10	8	7	11	9	7	11	12	12	12	Ret	14	14	
(Belgium) Laurent de Meeus	Ferrari 488 Challenge Evo	Coppa Shell AM	Ret	4	3	Ret							2	7	3	3		9th
2022
Driver	Car	Class	(Portugal) ALG		(France) LEC		(Hungary) BUD		(Germany) HOC		(United Kingdom) SIL		(Italy) MUG		(Italy) IMO			
Driver	Car	Class	R1	R2	R1	R2	R1	R2	R1	R2	R1	R2	R1	R2	R1	R2	FM	
(United Kingdom) Jack Brown	Ferrari 488 Challenge Evo	Trofeo Pirelli Pro-Am									2	DNS						
2023
Driver	Car	Class	VAL (Spain)		MIS (Italy)		RBR (Austria)		LMS (France)	EST (Portugal)		SPA (Belgium)		MUG (Italy)				
Driver	Car	Class	R1	R2	R1	R2	R1	R2	R1	R1	R2	R1	R2	R1	R2	FM		
(United Kingdom) Thomas Fleming	Ferrari 488 Challenge Evo	Trofeo Pirelli Pro	2	4	1	DSQ	3	4	4	1	1	2	1	3	1	1		2nd
(United Kingdom) James Owen	Ferrari 488 Challenge Evo	Trofeo Pirelli Pro-Am	7	Ret	4	6	DSQ	5	10	2	5	6	14	Ret	Ret	4		5th

=== Ferrari Finali Mondiali titles ===
	Circuit	Car	Driver	Class	Pos
2016	(United States) Daytona International Speedway	Ferrari 458 Challenge	(United Kingdom) Sam Smeeth	Trofeo Pirelli Pro-AM	1st
2019	(Italy) Autodromo Internazionale del Mugello	Ferrari 488 Challenge	(United Kingdom) Adam Carroll	Trofeo Pirelli Pro	1st
2023	(Italy) Autodromo Internazionale del Mugello	Ferrari 488 Challenge Evo	(United Kingdom) Thomas Fleming	Trofeo Pirelli Pro	1st

=== GT Cup Championship results ===
Circuit	Car	Driver	Class	Pos
2016
(United Kingdom) Snetterton Circuit	Ferrari 458 Challenge	(United Kingdom) Calum Lockie (United Kingdom) David Mason	Class 1	3rd
(United Kingdom) Snetterton Circuit	Ferrari 458 Challenge	(United Kingdom) Mike Wilds (United Kingdom) Anthony Wilds	Class 2	1st

=== Britcar results ===
Overall results published, not including places in class.

2016
Pos.	Drivers		No.	Class	SILGP	SNE	DON	THR	CRO	SILINT	OUL	BRH	Pts
5th	(United Kingdom) Calum Lockie (United Kingdom) David Mason	Ferrari 458 GT3	1	1	Ret		15	6	3	4	2	5	107
8th	(United Kingdom) Anthony Wilds (United Kingdom) Mike Wilds	Ferrari 458 Challenge	9	2		1	3	3		2			85
13th	(United Kingdom) Bonamy Grimes	Ferrari 458 Challenge	5	2	Ret	9				5		4	56
13th	(United Kingdom) Johnny Mowlem	Ferrari 458 Challenge	5	2	Ret	9						4	56
13th	(United Kingdom) Charlie Hollings	Ferrari 458 Challenge	5	2						5			56
18th	(United Kingdom) Simon Atkinson (United Kingdom) Leyton Clarke	Ferrari 458 Challenge	44	2			2						47
18th	(United Kingdom) Simon Atkinson (United Kingdom) Leyton Clarke	Ferrari 458 Challenge	4	2						3			47

2017
Pos.	Driver	Car	No.	Class	SIL		SNE		SIL		BRH		DON		OUL		SIL	BRH		Pts
Endurance Category Standings
4th	(Wales) Bonamy Grimes	Ferrari 458 Challenge	5	2	4	1	2	3	2	Ret	1	1	3	3	1	1		1	4	256
4th	(United Kingdom) Johnny Mowlem	Ferrari 458 Challenge	5	2	4	1	2	3	2	Ret	1	1			1	1		1	4	256
4th	(United Kingdom) Charlie Hollings	Ferrari 458 Challenge	5	2									3	3						256
13th	(United Kingdom) Graham Lucking (United Kingdom) Leyton Clarke	Ferrari 458 Challenge	4	2	Ret	20	6	4	5	2										92
16th	(United Kingdom) Mike Wilds (United Kingdom) Dino Zamparelli	Ferrari 458 Challenge	9	2	1	5	Ret	12												76
22th	(United Kingdom) Marc Brough (United Kingdom) Charlie Hollings	Ferrari 458 Challenge	23	2	7	3														37
24th	(United Kingdom) David Mason (United Kingdom) Calum Lockie	Ferrari 458 GT3	7	1	6	EX	7													31
27th	(Belgium) Laurent De Meeus (United Kingdom) Jamie Stanley	Ferrari 458 Challenge	22	2	25	18														25
Sprint Category Standings
6th	(United Kingdom) David Mason (United Kingdom) Calum Lockie	Ferrari 458 GT3	7	1				2	3	1	5	1	4	1			2	22	1	176
13th	(United Kingdom) Rob MacFarlane	Ferrari 360 Challenge	26	3					20	8										40
16th	(Belgium) Laurent de Meeus (United Kingdom) Jamie Stanley	Ferrari 458 Challenge	22	2			5	1												34
17th	(United Kingdom) Marc Brough (United Kingdom) Andrew Bentley	Ferrari 458 Challenge	23	2			4	3												31

2018
Pos.	Drivers	Car	No.	Class	ROC	SIL	OUL	DON	SNE	SIL	BRH	Pts
4th	(United Kingdom) David Mason (United Kingdom) Ross Wylie	Ferrari 458 GT3	7	1S	2	5	4	Ret	2	2	1	257
14th	(United Kingdom) Johnny Mowlem (United Kingdom) Ivor Dunbar	Ferrari 458 GT3	5	1E		1						43
	(United Kingdom) John Seale	Ferrari 488 Challenge	55	1S	4	6						
	(Belgium) Laurent de Meeus (United Kingdom) Jamie Stanley	Ferrari 488 Challenge	22	S2 A					1			
	(United Kingdom) Ronnie Garrick (United Kingdom) Fulvio Mussi	Ferrari 458 Challenge	45						Ret			

2019
Pos.	Drivers	Car	No.	Class	SIL		SIL		BRH		DON		OUL	SNE	OUL	BRH	Pts
12th	(United Kingdom) David Mason (United Kingdom) Ross Wylie	Ferrari 488 Challenge	7	2	11	6	5	3	5	12	Ret	DNS					148

2021
Pos.	Drivers	Car	No.	Class	SIL1		SNE		OUL	SIL2	BRH		DON		Pts
Endurance
7th	(United Kingdom) Bonamy Grimes (United Kingdom) Johnny Mowlem	Ferrari 458 Challenge	16	3	9	10	3	4		7	C	C	Ret	6	189

2022
Pos.	Drivers	Car	No.	Class	SIL1	OUL	SNE	SIL2	DON1	DON2	Pts
32nd	(United Kingdom) John Seale (United Kingdom) Jamie Stanley	Ferrari 488 Challenge	555	B	16						28
