= David Mason (art dealer) =

London art dealer (born 1939)

David Leslie Mason OBE (born 15 March 1939) is a London art dealer and Thalidomide parent activist. He is the father of a daughter, Louise, disabled by thalidomide.

Mason was educated at Highgate School, where he studied under Kyffin Williams.

== Role in thalidomide scandal ==
Mason's daughter Louise Medus was born in 1962 with stunted arms or legs.

Mason alone refused the initial offered settlement of £3 million by Distillers Company, which was only to be awarded if all the parents agreed. As a result of which he and his daughter suffered harassment and ostracism. His daughter was removed from his care, due to action by his solicitors and other parents supporting settlement, who believed he was not acting in her best interests by refusing settlement. He launched an appeal, which was successful due to evidence of a more substantial settlement in the USA ($2.7m to Shirley McCarrick in Los Angeles). Finally, a Sunday Times story prompted Jack Ashley MP to take up the case in Parliament, and Ralph Nader to organise a boycott of Distillers products in the USA. Distillers increased the offer to £5m and then £20m, which was accepted. The settlement is credited with transforming the lives of British thalidomide victims.

The Thalidomide Trust is now largely funded by Diageo, who bought Distillers and its assets and liabilities.

Mason's book Thalidomide: My Fight was published in 1976. He was awarded the OBE in the 1996 Birthday Honours 'for services to health charities'.

== Racing record ==
Alongside the family art business, in 1957 he began his involvement with motor racing and in the 1970s he became a sponsor of Formula One. After returning to the sport in 2010, he won the Britcar Endurance Championship in 2014, driving a Ferrari 458 with Calum Lockie. For the 2019 Britcar season, Mason returned once again with British GT driver Ross Wylie, driving a Ferrari 488 Challenge. Mason is one of the oldest active racing drivers competing in endurance racing at 80 years old.

=== 24 Hours of Silverstone results ===
Year	Team	Co-Drivers	Car	Car No.	Class	Laps	Pos.	Class Pos.
2011	(United Kingdom) Tonge Sport	(United Kingdom) Fred Tonge (United Kingdom) Tim Hood (United Kingdom) Darren Dowling (United Kingdom) Steve Glynn (United Kingdom) Paul Smith	TVR Sagaris	28	2	71	DNF	DNF

=== Complete Britcar results ===
(key) (Races in bold indicate pole position in class – 1 point awarded just in first race) (Races in italics indicate fastest lap in class – 1 point awarded all races)

Year	Team	Car	Class	1	2	3	4	5	6	7	8	9	10	11	12	13	14	15	16	DC	CP	Points
2016	FF Corse	Ferrari 458 GT3	1	**SILGP**; Ret	SNE	DON; 15	THR; 6	CRO; 3	**SILINT**; 4	**OUL**; 2	BRH; 4									5th	2nd	107
2017	FF Corse	Ferrari 458 GT3	E1	SIL; 1; 6	SIL; 2 EX	SNE; 1; 7														24th	6th	31
2017	FF Corse	Ferrari 458 GT3	S1				SNE; 2; 2	**SIL**; **1**; 3	SIL; 2; 1	**BRH**; **1**; 5	BRH; 2; 1	**DON**; **1**; 4	DON; 2; 1	OUL; 1	OUL; 2	**SIL**; 2	**BRH**; **1**; 22	BRH; 2; 1		6th	1st	176
2018	FF Corse	Ferrari 458 GT3	S1	**ROC**; **1**; 2	ROC; 2; 3	**SIL**; **1**; 5	SIL; 2; 2	**OUL**; **1**; 4	OUL; 2; 7	DON; 1 Ret	DON; 2; 3	**SNE**; **1**; 2	SNE; 2; 2	**SIL**; **1**; 2	SIL; 2; 1	**BRH**; **1**; 2	BRH; 1; 1			4th	1st	257
2019	FF Corse	Ferrari 458 Challenge	2	**SIL**; **1**; 11	SIL; 2; 6	**SIL**; **1**; 5	SIL; 2; 3	**BRH**; **1**; 5	BRH; 2; 12	**DON**; **1** Ret	DON; 2 DNS	OUL; 1	OUL; 2	SNE; 1	SNE; 2	OUL; 1	OUL; 2	BRH; 1	BRH; 2	12th	4th	148
