= Dave Benett =

British photographer

- Benet in 2026
- Born: 1958 (age 67–68)
- Occupation: Photographer

David M. Benett (born 1958) is a British society and celebrity photographer based in London. Since 2004, Benett has been a contributing photographer for Getty Images, specialising in candid photography of celebrities — work for which he has twice been awarded Photographer of the Year awards from the UK Picture Editors' Guild.

== Biography ==
=== Early years ===
Dave Benett was born in 1958.

=== Photographic career ===
In 1975, Benett moved from Liverpool to London where he started working as a photographer for television and newspapers. Benett first worked on news and sport at London News Service and Sport & General in the City, close to Fleet Street, before quickly discovering his metier in celebrity photography. During this period, he divided his time between news and showbiz, covering era defining news events like the Brixton riots, the trial of Dennis Nilsen and gangs of skinheads in South End for national papers as well as what was then Thames News.

From 1983, Benett began focussing solely on show business events in the early days of the paparazzi, establishing himself as a celebrity photographer. Benett worked at globally recognized events such as the Free Mandela concerts, as well as covering London's celebrity elite as they partied at all the hottest night spots of the 80s.

During the early 90s, Benett crossed over to being an 'inside' photographer, as his connections with The Evening Standard afforded personal invitations and accreditation for major cultural events. He has been the Evening Standard's main photographer for arts, culture and showbiz events since the mid 80s, not only working at major events with national appeal but also covering almost every major theatre first night in london for the last 30 years.

Benett is a photographer known for candid celebrity portraiture. His work includes photographing events such as the Queen Mother's 99th birthday. His images have been published internationally.

=== Move to Getty ===
Benett joined Getty Images's contributors in 2004 after 14 years at Alpha Photographers Ltd.

Benett received the Picture Editors' Guild Celebrity Photographer of the Year Award in both 2011 and 2013 and is currently regularly published in The London Evening Standard, The Daily Express, The Daily Star, The I, Grazia, Hello, Harpers Bazaar, Esquire and GQ magazine.

== Motor racing ==
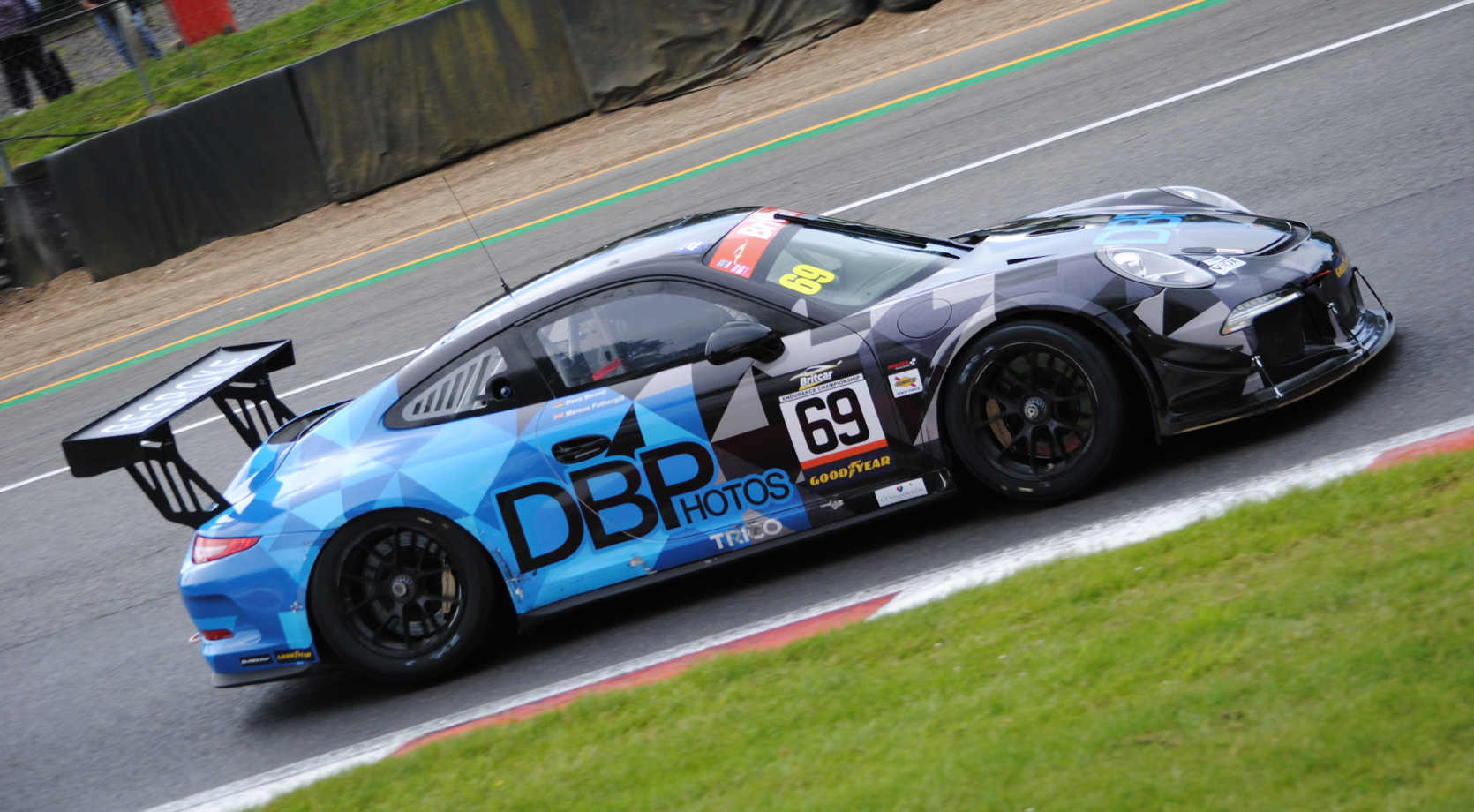
Benett's Porsche 991 Cup, which he shares with Marcus Fothergill in the 2021 Britcar Endurance Championship.

Benett has, for a number of years, raced a Porsche 997 GT3 Cup car in the Britcar Endurance Championship with Marcus Fothergill. He has competed in every iteration of the Britcar series, including the 24 hour races at Silverstone.

== Awards ==
- 2011 UK Picture Editors' Guild Celebrity Photographer of the Year Award
- 2013 UK Picture Editors' Guild Fashion and Entertainment Photographer of the Year Award
