= Brabham Racing =

- Founded: 2014
- Team principal(s): David Brabham
- Current series: None; FIA WEC 2021-22 (planned)

Brabham Racing (originally Project Brabham) is a motor racing team founded by David Brabham, the youngest son of Formula One world champion Jack Brabham, The goal is to bring the Brabham name back to competitive competition through crowdsourcing.

== Background ==
=== History ===
The original Brabham team which was founded in 1960 by Jack Brabham and Ron Tauranac raced in many forms of motorsport from 1960 to 1992, including Formula One, Formula Two, Formula Three, Formula 5000 and IndyCar.

=== Current team ===
In September 2014, David Brabham announced the reformation of the Brabham Racing team under the name Project Brabham, with plans to enter the 2015 FIA World Endurance Championship and 2015 24 Hours of Le Mans in the LMP2 category using a crowdsourcing business model.

In January 2019, Brabham Automotive announced its intention to enter the 2021 FIA World Endurance Championship using a homologated BT62 in the GTE class.

== Founding ==
The Project Brabham announcement followed a lengthy legal dispute between the Brabham family and a German businessman, which was finally settled in the Brabham family's favour. With control of the brand once more, David Brabham began developing the crowdsourcing business model. According to Brabham, the concept came based on his own experience as well as capitalising on the fan base from the original Motor Racing Developments team from the 1960s. The crowdsourcing model was designed to engage existing fans to help Brabham as he approached financial backers as the team searched for initial funding.

The team planned to use customer LMP2 cars initially, entering the World Endurance Championship in 2015. After two or three seasons the team planned on becoming a fully fledged LMP1 constructor. However, the entry was later delayed until 2021, will enter in the LM GTE class, and will be primarily funded by Brabham Automotive and commercial sponsors.

Brabham has claimed the team is looking at Formula One but a number of financial matters need to change before it would be interested in entering.
