= SRO GT2 =

Class of race cars

SRO GT2 is a class of grand tourer racing cars maintained by the SRO Motorsports Group. Despite the name, this class slots between GT4 and GT3 in terms of performance. The cars have more power than GT3 cars, with the most powerful entries at nearly 700 horsepower, but they have much less downforce than a GT3 car.

They should not be confused with the Group GT2 from the early 2000s, which evolved into the now-defunct LM GTE class.

The class uses a balance of performance to allow for close competition between competitors.

== History ==
The new GT2 category was announced by the SRO in 2018. It was created as the GT3 category became more focused on downforce and also harder to drive for amateur drivers. The GT2 cars would mainly focus on having a powerful engine with 640-700hp, which would be more powerful than a 560hp GT3 engine, while having low downforce more similar to the GT4 category.

The first GT2 race was a Porsche single-make event at the 2019 24 Hours of Spa, fielding the 911 GT2 RS Clubsport alongside a few Porsche 935s. A second GT2 car, the Audi R8 LMS GT2, also made its public debut at the same time. The R8 GT2 saw its race debut at the 2019 GT Sports Club finale at Barcelona.

During 2020, both KTM and Lamborghini launched their GT2 models, the KTM X-Bow GT2 and the Lamborghini Huracán Super Trofeo GT2.

In 2021 the GT Sportsclub was renamed to the GT2 European Series, and only allowed for SRO GT2 class cars to compete. The GT America Series also added the GT2 category as a class alongside its GT3 and GT4 classes.

== Homologated cars ==
As of January 2026, nine cars have been homologated for the SRO GT2 class. A few non-homologated cars have also raced in GT2 competition, such as the second generation Porsche 935, Ferrari 488 Challenge Evo & 296 Challenge and the Mercedes-AMG GT Track series.

| Homologation | Year | Manufacturer | Model | Developer | Photo | Notes |
|---|---|---|---|---|---|---|
| GT2-000 | 2020 | Lamborghini | Huracán Super Trofeo GT2 | Lamborghini Squadra Corse | | GT2 kit for the Lamborghini Huracán Super Trofeo: Includes: Huracán Super Trofeo Evo; Huracán Super Trofeo Evo2 |
| GT2-001 | 2018 | Porsche | 911 GT2 RS Clubsport | Porsche Motorsport | | Includes: 911 GT2 RS Clubsport Evo |
| GT2-002 | 2019 | Audi | R8 LMS GT2 | Audi Sport | | |
| GT2-003 | 2020 | KTM | X-Bow GT2 | Reiter Engineering | | Includes: X-Bow GT2 Evo |
| GT2-004 | 2023 | Mercedes-AMG | AMG GT2 | HWA | | |
| GT2-005 | 2021 | Brabham | BT63 GT2 | Brabham Automotive | | Brabham BT62 developed to GT2 specifications |
| GT2-006 | 2023 | Maserati | MC20 GT2 | Maserati Corse | | |
| GT2-XXX | 2025 | Ginetta | G56 GT2 | Ginetta Cars | | |
| GT2-XXX | 2025 | Ligier | JS2 RS | Ligier | | |

== Series ==
Since 2020, SRO GT2 cars have been either exclusive to or in a distinct class in each of the following.

As premier class

- GT2 European Series

As subsidiary class

- 24H Series
- Belcar
- GT America Series
- GT Cup Championship
- GT Cup Series
- GT Winter Series
- Nürburgring Langstrecken Series
- SRO Japan Cup
- Supercar Challenge
- Ultimate Cup Series

== See also ==
- Group 3
- Group 4
- Group 5
- Group B
- Group GT1
- Group N-GT
- Group GT2
- Group GT3
- SRO GT4
