= 1987 Australian Drivers' Championship =

Motor racing competition

Seasons
- ← 1986 1988 →

The 1987 Australian Drivers' Championship was a CAMS sanctioned national motor racing title contested over a single race for Australian Formula 2 racing cars. The race, billed as the "Australia Cup for the 1987 CAMS Gold Star", was staged at the Adelaide Street Circuit in South Australia on Friday, 13 November 1987. This was the first year that the championship had been restricted to Australian Formula 2 cars and is the only year to date in which the title has been awarded on the results of a single race rather than a series of races.

David Brabham won the race after a remarkable drive from grid position 38 after poor qualifying caused by missing almost all of practice with carburettor and electrical problems.

While Brabham picked his way through the field the battle for the race saw Rohan Onslow and Mark McLaughlin take the lead after polesitter Arthur Abrahams was left on the grid with a failed ignition ballast restrictor. McLaughlin led for much of the race but his Elfin slowed near the end of the race and was swamped by Onslow then Brabham. With two laps remaining Brabham caught and passed Onlow and pulled away for a 1.7-second victory.

Ian Richards and John Wise fought over fourth for much of the event but Wise slowed near the end of the race with Shane Flynn taking fifth ahead of Chris Hocking.

== Classification ==
Results as follows.

Pos	No.	Driver	Team	Car	Laps
1	8	David Brabham	Australian Motor Racing	Ralt RT30 Volkswagen	15
2	71	Rohan Onslow	Michael Borland	Cheetah Mk. 8 Volkswagen	15
3	9	Mark McLaughlin	Elfin Sports Cars Pty Ltd	Elfin 852 Volkswagen	15
4	22	Ian Richards	Ian Richards	Richards 201C Volkswagen	15
5	70	Shane Flynn	Avanti Spares	Kaditcha Volkswagen	15
6	74	Chris Hocking	Chris Hocking	Cheetah Mk. 6 Volkswagen	15
7	12	Sam Astuti	Salvatore Astuti	Cheetah Mk. 6 Ford	15
8	44	Neil Israel	Magnum Racing Australia	Magnum 863 Volkswagen	15
9	29	Wayne Walker	Wayne Walker	Chevron B42 Ford	15
10	27	Graeme Smith	Graeme Smith	Cheetah Mk. 8 Volkswagen	15
11	7	Vince McLaughlan	Kevin McLaughlan	Cheetah Mk. 8 Volkswagen	15
12	34	Carl Gibson	Carl Gibson	Elfin 792 Volkswagen	15
13	37	Richard Davison	Richard Davison	Cheetah Mk. 8 Volkswagen	15
14	78	Tony Rees	AG Rees	Ralt RT3 Volkswagen	15
15	32	John Wise	John Wise	Cheetah Mk. 7 Volkswagen	15
16	18	Rodney Moody	Rodney Moody	Cheetah Mk. 6 Toyota	15
17	28	David Goode	David Goode	Elfin 630 Ford	15
18	2	Grahame Blee	Bill Slattery's Bus & Truck Sales	Cheetah Mk. 6GE Volkswagen	15
19	73	Adrian Martin	Adrian Martin	Ralt RT1 Ford	15
20	31	Wayne Ford	Wayne Ford	Ralt RT3 Ford	15
	26	Ron Barnacle	Ron Barnacle	Wren	
	25	Rob Newman	Rob Newman	Cheetah Mk. 7 Toyota	
Ret	45	Mike Drewer	Mike Drewer	Cheetah Mk. 7 Toyota	6
Ret	33	Mike Holmes	Mike Holmes	ME1 Volkswagen	3
Ret	46	Stephen Noble	John Silman	Richards 201 Volkswagen	3
Ret	14	Peter Beehag	Peter Beehag	PBS 852 Nissan	2
Ret	24	Tom Coull	Tom Coull	Elfin 620 Ford	1
Ret	1	Arthur Abrahams	Arthur Abrahams	Ransberg-Cheetah Volkswagen	0
DNS		Derek Pingel		Cheetah Mk.8 Volkswagen	
DNS		Michael Lock		Richards 201 Volkswagen	

- Note: Given that there were thirty six cars on the grid, there are eight drivers not accounted for in the above table.
