= David Brabham =

Australian racing driver (born 1965)

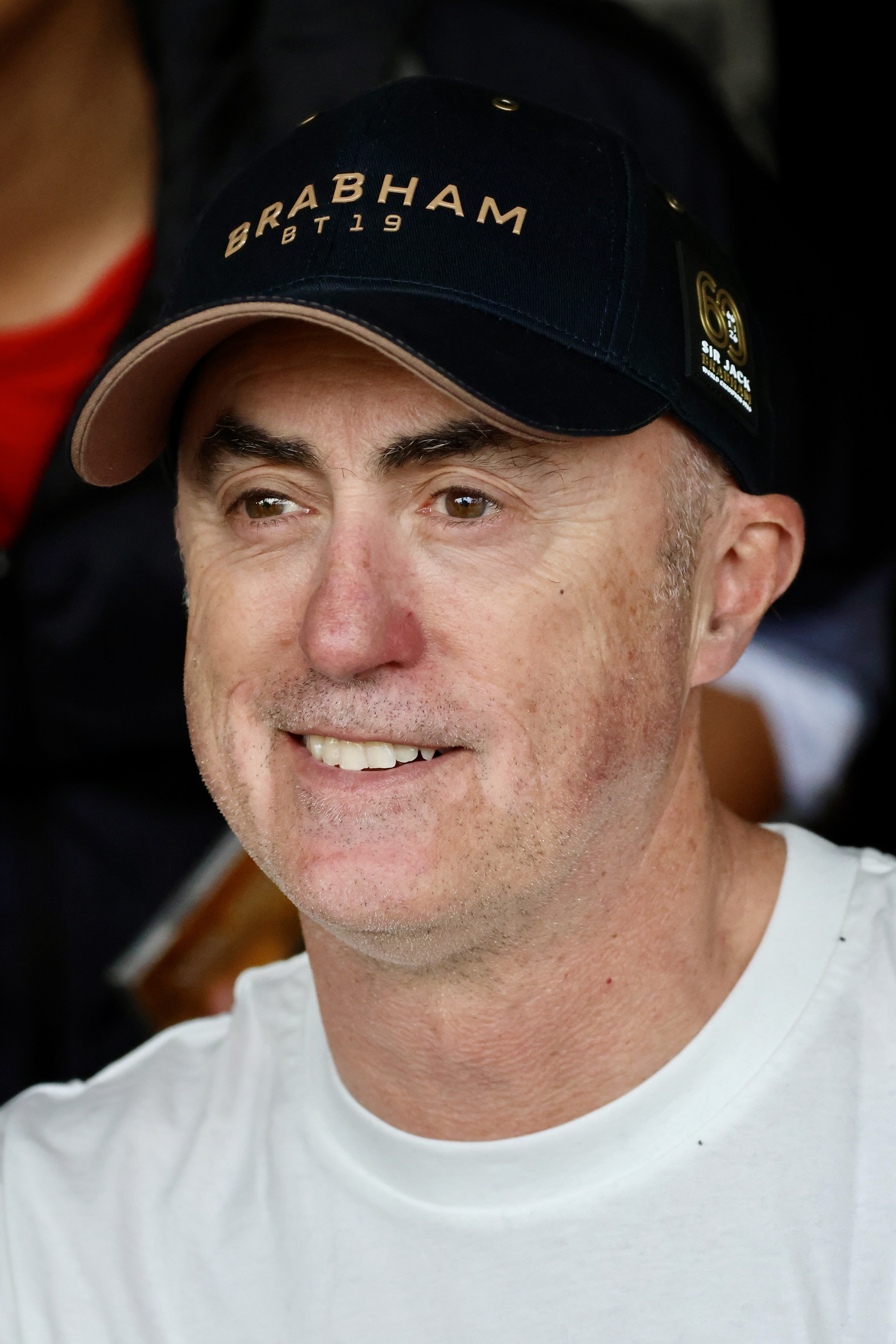
- Brabham in 2012
- Born: David Philip Brabham; 5 September 1965 (age 61) Wimbledon, London, England
- Categorisation: FIA Platinum (until 2015); FIA Gold (2016–2020); FIA Silver (2021–)

Formula One World Championship career
- Nationality: (Australia) Australian
- Active years: 1990, 1994
- Team(s): Brabham, Simtek
- Entries: 30 (24 starts)
- Championships: 0
- Wins: 0
- Podiums: 0
- Career points: 0
- Pole positions: 0
- Fastest laps: 0
- First entry: 1990 San Marino Grand Prix
- Last entry: 1994 Australian Grand Prix

24 Hours of Le Mans career
- Years: 1992–1993, 1996–2010, 2012
- Teams: Tom Walkinshaw Racing, Gulf Racing/GTC Racing, David Price Racing, Panoz Motorsports, Team Bentley, Zytek Engineering, Aston Martin Racing, Russian Age Racing, Peugeot Sport Total, Highcroft Racing, JRM
- Best finish: 1st (2009)
- Class wins: 3 (2007, 2008, 2009)

David Philip Brabham (born 5 September 1965) is an Australian racing driver and one of the most successful and experienced specialists in sports car racing. He has won three international Sports Car series and is one of four Australians to have won the Le Mans 24 Hour sports car race, winning the event in 2009. Brabham won the American Le Mans Series in 2009 and 2010. He also competed in Formula One, racing for the Brabham and Simtek teams in 1990 and 1994, respectively. Brabham is the youngest son of three-time Formula One world champion Sir Jack Brabham, brother to Geoff Brabham and Gary Brabham. He is also brother-in-law to Mike Thackwell, father to Sam Brabham and uncle to Matthew Brabham.

== Early life ==
Brabham, who was born in Wimbledon, London, spent his childhood in Australia. Despite his father's motor racing fame he took little interest in motor racing until after he left school. As a child he played soccer up until the age of twelve and then took up Australian rules football when the family moved to Sydney. Growing up, Sir Jack did not force David into racing, and it was only after discovering go-karts at 17, that he became enthusiastic enough to purchase a second-hand go-kart with his next-door neighbour and to begin racing.

== Motor racing career ==
=== Early career ===
Brabham's professional racing career began in Australia in 1983, racing karts for two years, after which he moved into the Ford Laser "one make" series for 1985. In 1986, he switched to Formula Ford 1600 and subsequently to Australian Formula 2, winning the 1987 Australian Drivers' Championship in that category. The 1987 ADC was, unlike previous years, only held as a single race rather than a series of rounds and was run as a support category to the 1987 Australian Grand Prix in Adelaide. After starting 38th on the grid due to carburettor and electrical problems with his Ralt RT30 Volkswagen in qualifying, he caught and passed leader Rohan Onslow on lap 13 of the 15 lap race and went on to a 1.7 second victory.

Brabham also competed in the New Zealand Formula Atlantic series, the American Formula Atlantic series and in the South American Formula 3 Championship during the 1987 season. A move from Australia to Europe under sponsorship from Camel in 1989 saw him joining the Bowman team and winning the British Formula Three Championship.

=== Formula One career ===
Brabham's break into Formula One in 1990 with the Brabham team met with little success. He had raised a considerable amount of sponsorship to join the team bearing his family name (though it had been sold on three times since) but financial constraints hindered the team all season. While David had been hired to drive ahead of the season, he requested to skip the first two races to prepare himself, Gregor Foitek taking the seat instead. Ironically his brother Gary attempted to qualify for the first two rounds in the ill-fated Life before quitting; the brothers therefore both contested the 1990 season without actually entering any of the same meetings.

Brabham's first outing with the team was the 1990 San Marino Grand Prix where he failed to qualify. His first Formula One start came at the next race in Monaco where his father Jack had won in 1959, his first championship year. In 14 races, he only managed to qualify the uncompetitive Judd-engined car six times, including the last race of the year at home in Australia. This, and David being unable to raise the reported $3m needed to keep his place in the team, led to him being replaced at the end of the season. Brabham joined the Tom Walkinshaw Racing Jaguar team in 1991 and also in that year won the Spa 24 Hours driving a Nissan Skyline R32 GT-R alongside Naoki Hattori and Anders Olofsson.

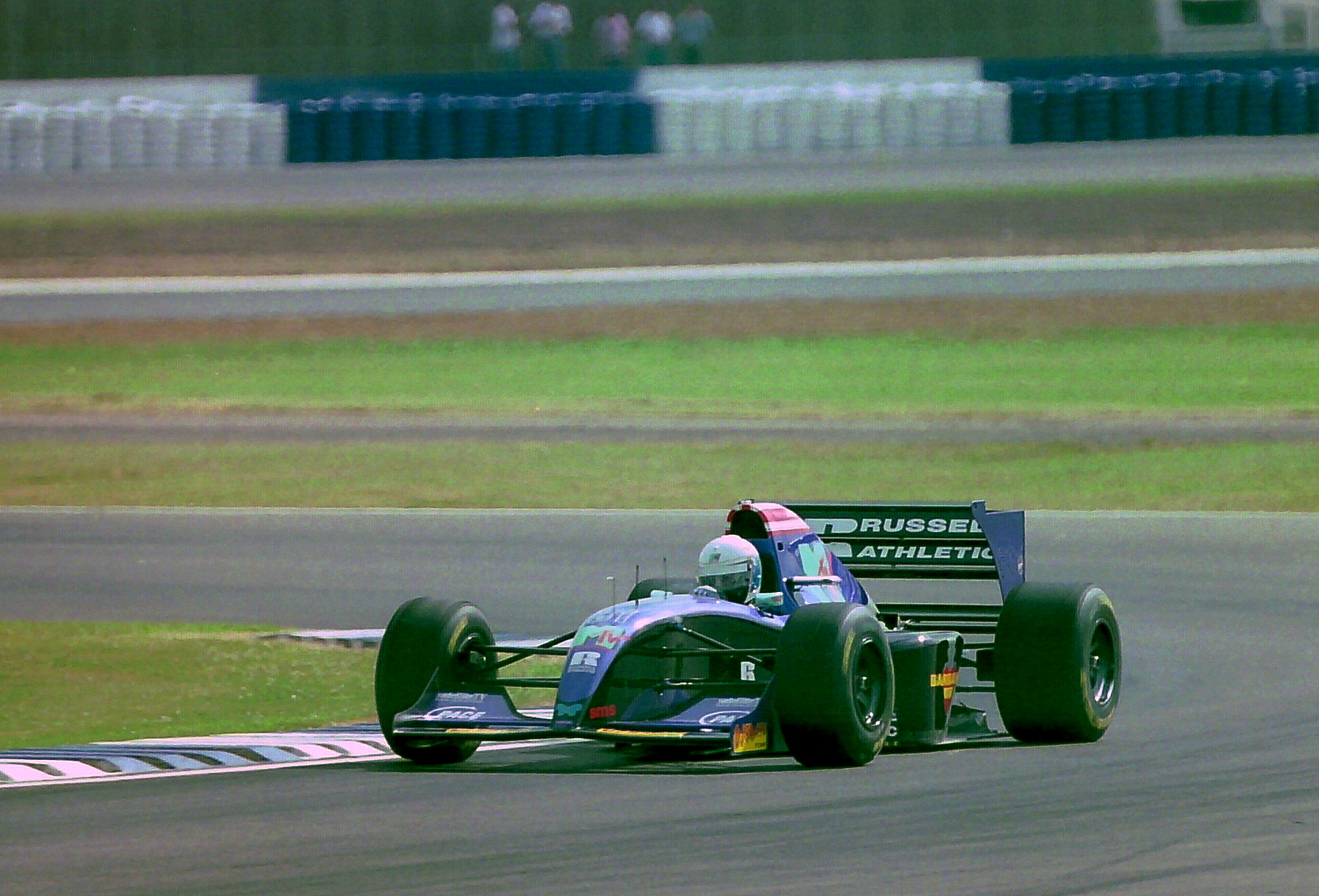
Brabham driving the Simtek S941 at the 1994 British Grand Prix meeting at Silverstone

Brabham returned to Formula One in 1994 with the under-funded Simtek team after his father bought shares in the team. The second seat was to be filled by paying drivers, with Roland Ratzenberger taking the first five races before Jean-Marc Gounon took over. The S941 chassis was overweight, used a fully manual gearbox as opposed to the semi-automatic types used by most teams and inferior wire-spring Cosworth HB customer engines. Despite this, Brabham qualified for every round of the series. The team suffered the blow of the death of Ratzenberger during qualifying for the San Marino Grand Prix. Traditionally the other team driver would withdraw in such a situation, but seeing the demoralisation around him, Brabham decided to race on, only to crash out after a suspension failure of his own. In Ratzenberger's memory, the team made a collective decision to see out the season, with Brabham's strong leadership often cited as a key factor. While the Simtek was uncompetitive, he won considerable acclaim for his determination and for gradually improving the speed of the underfunded package, also handily out-performing his various teammates.

=== Touring cars ===
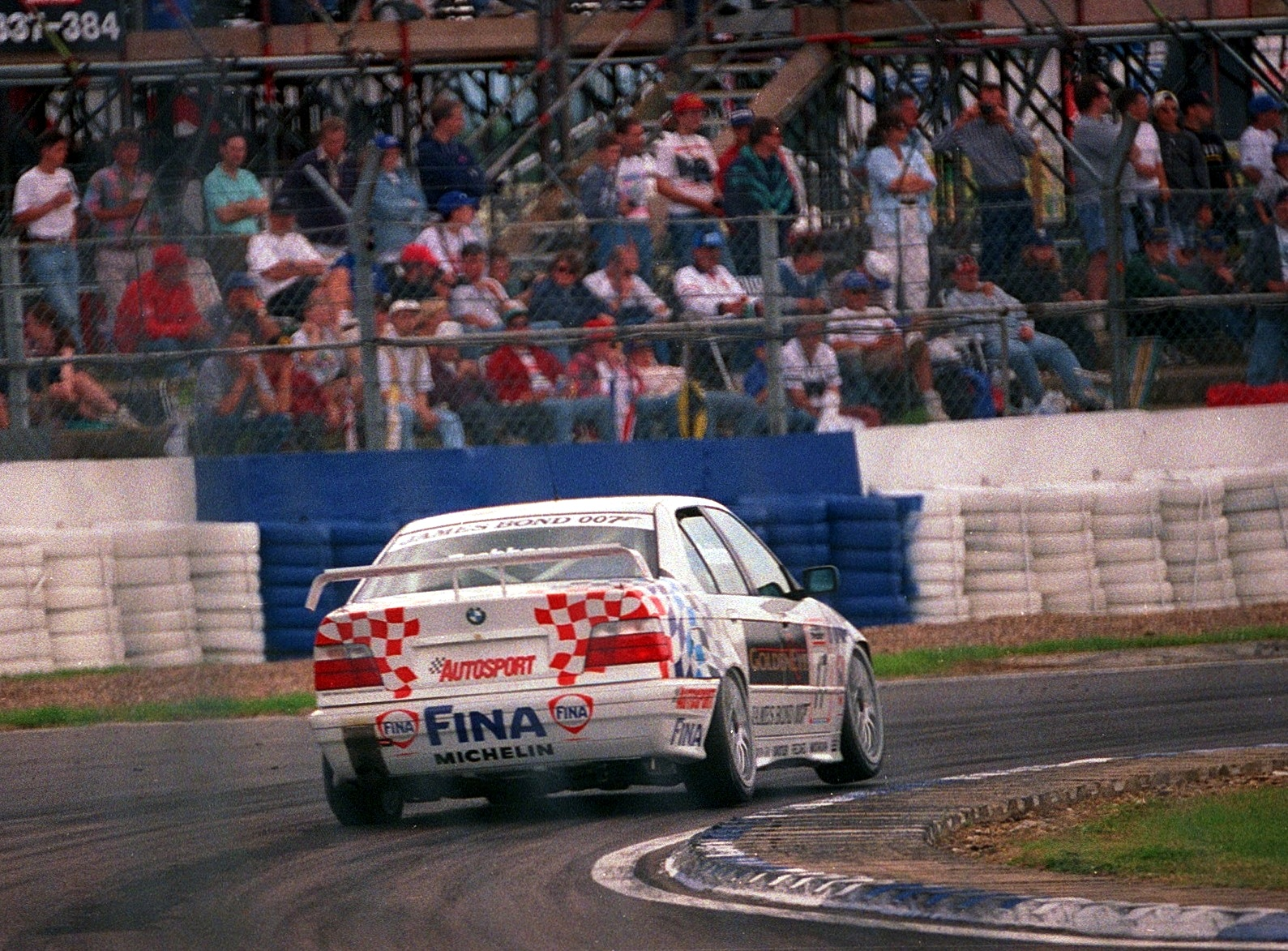
Brabham driving for BMW at Silverstone during the 1995 British Touring Car Championship season

Brabham quit Formula One at the end of that year to begin touring car racing – while he wanted to help Simtek the salary offered by the BMW works team was too good to ignore. 1995 in a BTCC BMW was not a success, but subsequent successes included winning the 1996 JGTC GT500 championship in McLaren F1 GTR (so far the only non-Japanese team car to win this), and the 1997 AMP Bathurst 1000 in its Super Touring era. Driving a BMW 320i at Bathurst with brother Geoff, the pair were flagged in second but were elevated to the win soon after the finish when their BMW Motorsport Australia teammates Paul Morris and Craig Baird were disqualified.,

=== GT racing ===
Brabham joined Sumo Power GT for the 2011 FIA GT1 World Championship, teaming with Jamie Campbell-Walter in a Nissan GT-R. The duo finished 10th in the driver's championship. He joined the Blancpain Endurance Series in 2012, driving a McLaren MP4-12C for United Autosports.

=== Sports car racing ===
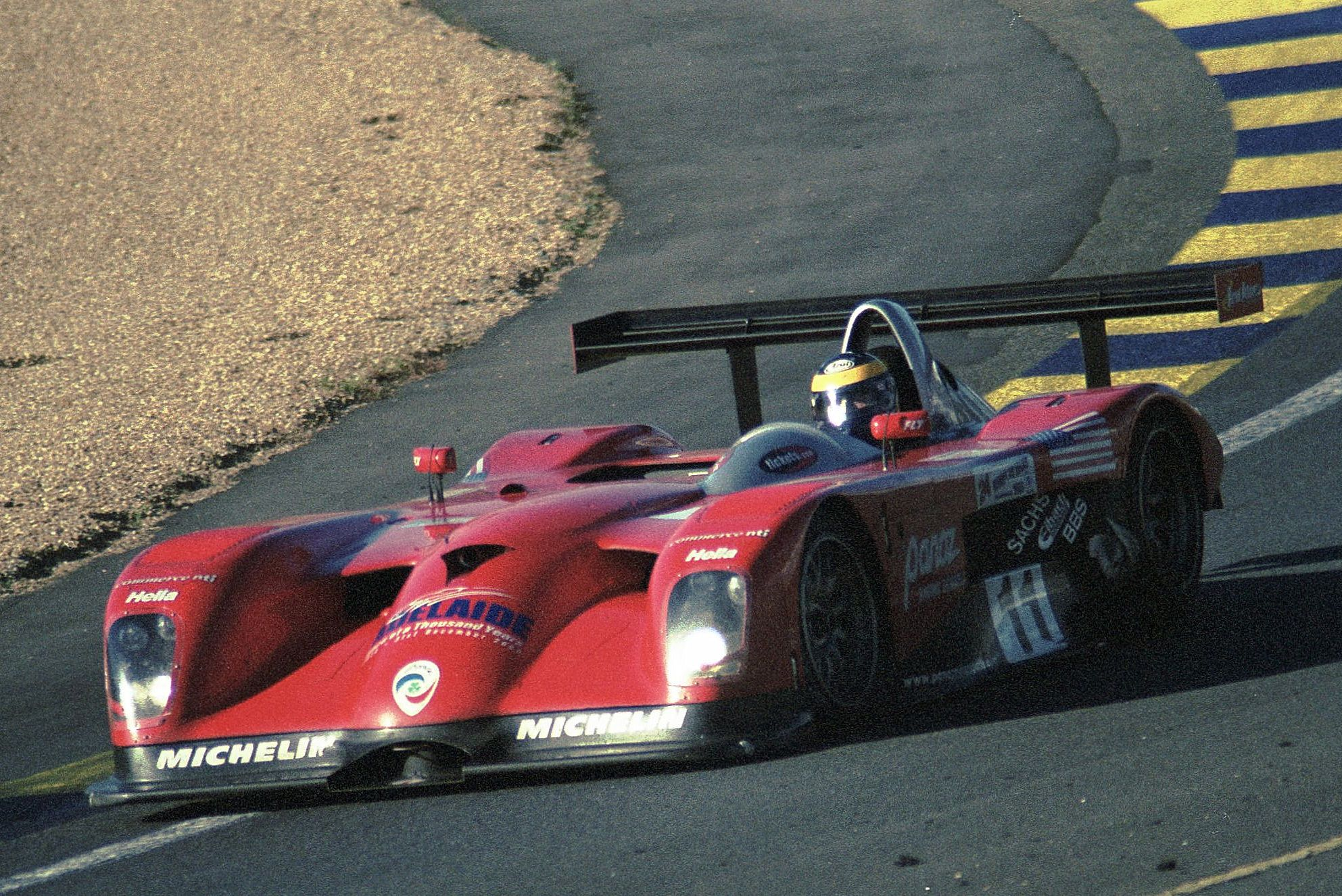
Brabham driving the distinctive Panoz LMP-1 Roadster-S during the 2000 24 Hours of Le Mans

Brabham won the Professional Sports Car Championship in the United States with the Panoz racing team in 1998, and the 1999 Petit Le Mans race also with Panoz. Since 1999, Brabham has been a regular in the American Le Mans Series (ALMS), having raced for teams such as Panoz and Prodrive Ferrari 550 Maranello. He won the Sebring 12-hour race in 2005. In Australia, he has contested the Bathurst 24 Hour race and continued to make occasional appearances in the Bathurst 1000.

Brabham has won a total of 23 ALMS events across all four classes in the series. He is a two-time champion in the series, winning the LMP1 title in 2009 and LMP title in 2010.

In 2003, Brabham won first-in-class (4th overall) with Multimatic Motorsports at the 24 Hours of Daytona, the Daytona Prototype category's inaugural race. Brabham finished second at the 2003 24 Hours of Le Mans driving for Bentley. In 2005 he started the first of four consecutive Le Mans starts racing Aston Martin DBR9's. He finished ninth overall and third in the GT1 Class for Aston Martin Racing. At the 2006 24 Hours of Le Mans, Brabham scored a fourth in the GT1 category (ninth overall) driving for Russian Age Racing. Brabham won the GT1 class of the 2007 24 Hours of Le Mans and again in the 2008 24 Hours of Le Mans driving for Aston Martin Racing.

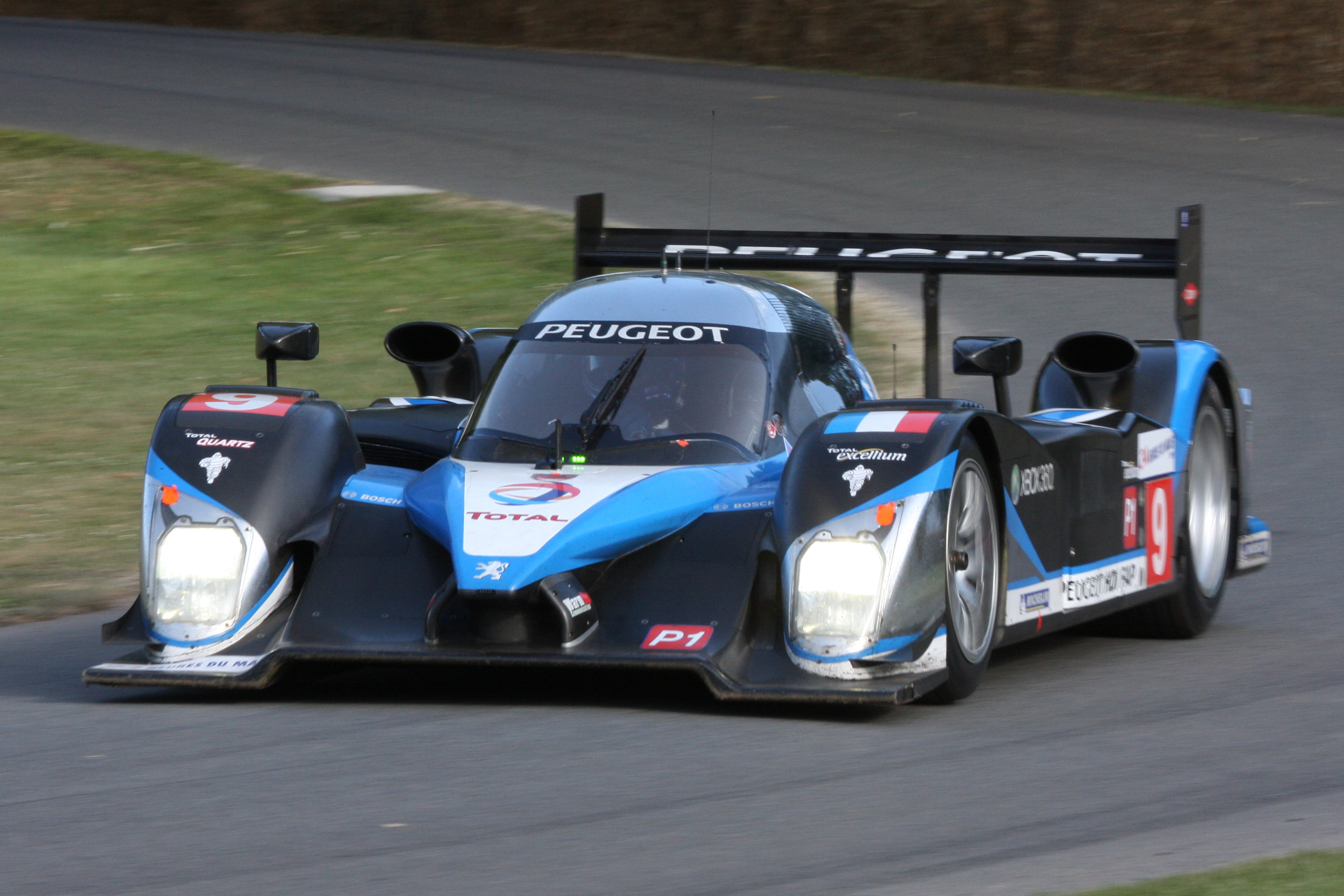
Brabham driving the 2009 24 Hours of Le Mans winning Peugeot 908 at the Goodwood Festival of Speed

Driving for Peugeot, he won the 2009 24 Hours of Le Mans outright with co-drivers Alexander Wurz and Marc Gené driving a Peugeot 908 HDi FAP. He joined brother Geoff as a Le Mans winner with his older brother having also won for Peugeot in 1993. It also saw him join his father and older brother as an outright winner at Le Mans with father Jack having won the only French Grand Prix held at the Bugatti Circuit in 1967.

David Brabham became only the fourth Australian driver to win the 24 Hours of Le Mans following Bernard Rubin in 1928, Vern Schuppan in 1983, and older brother Geoff in 1993.

Brabham won the 2009 and 2010 American Le Mans Series LMP championship, driving for Highcroft Racing. For 2012, he would compete in the FIA World Endurance Championship in a JRM Racing Honda Performance Development ARX-03a.

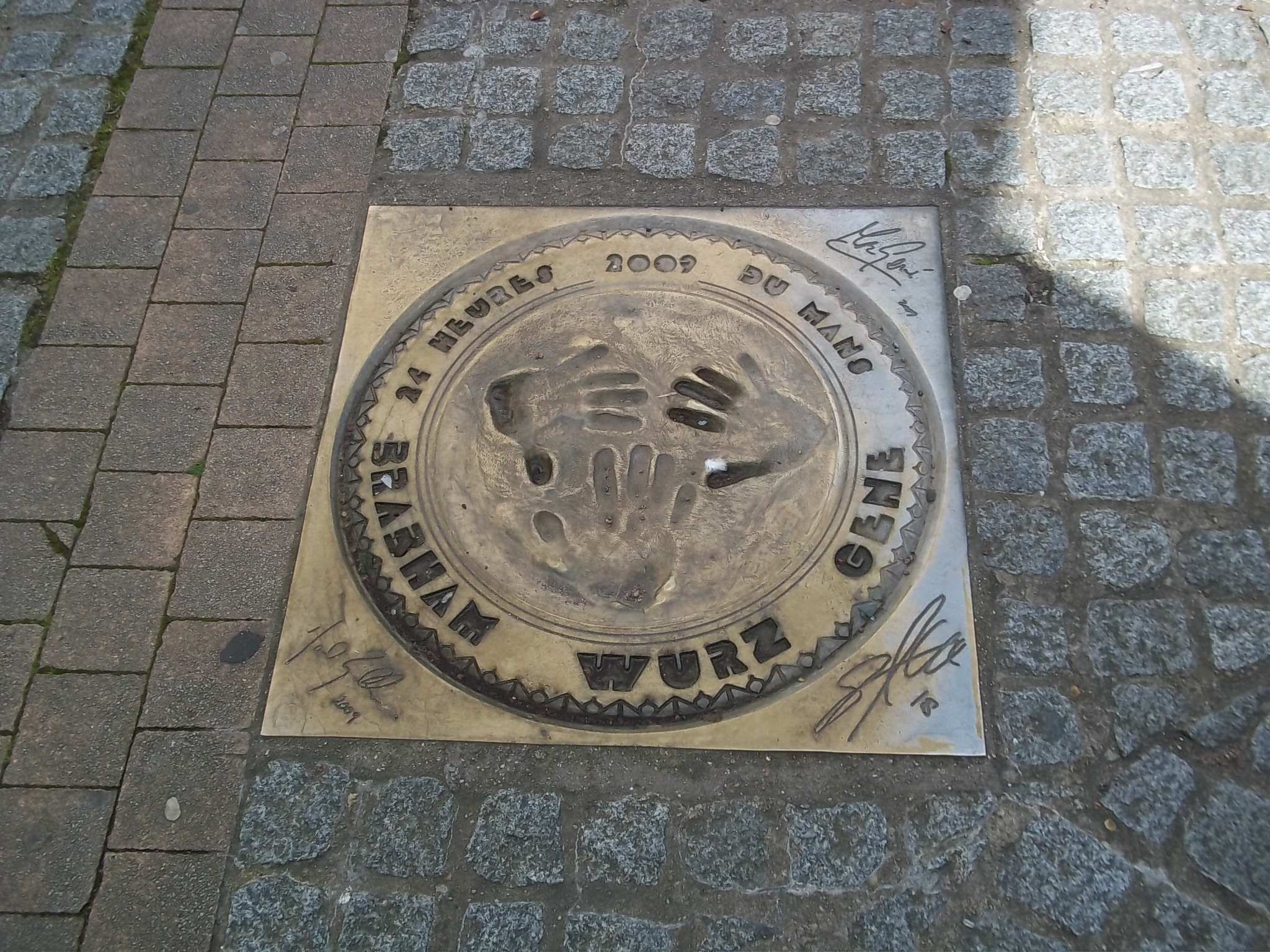
Walk of fame - Le Mans, Handprints and signatures from the winners of the 2009 edition of the 24 Hours of Le Mans

== Project Brabham ==
In the Autumn of 2014, Project Brabham was announced as an innovative and new way of setting up a motor racing team. The project is aimed at integrating the public and fans with the team. The initial start-up of the project was run via crowdfunding through the Indiegogo portal, where members of the public and fans alike could become part of the team.

″The money from crowdfunding has been used to build this first stage Brabham-Digital website. We also created investor prospectus, which helps in searching and securing the investment required to build and launch both the team and Brabham-Digital platform"

The project is still gathering much needed investment to get the team onto the track with the aim to become part of the FIA World Endurance championship.

The project sought investors and partners to fund the development of the Brabham-Digital platform, which was planned to include three knowledge-sharing and e-learning platforms.

== Brabham Automotive ==
Brabham launched Brabham Automotive in May 2018. Its first product is the Brabham BT62. Brabham drove the car on its racing debut at Brands Hatch on 9 and 10 November, participating in Britcar's annual 'Into the Night' races. He was joined in the car by Will Powell. He drove the car home to victory at Brands Hatch as a remarkable win, the Brabham BT62's first ever race and win and Brabham Automotive's first car and win. In a post-race interview, he referred to his father's win at the 1966 British Grand Prix who won in a Brabham BT19.

== Family ==
Lisa Brabham (née Thackwell)
- Nationality: New Zealand
- Born: Lisa Jane Thackwell; 1964 or 1965 (age 60–61)
- Years active: 1987–1994

Brabham's two older brothers Geoff and Gary also pursued motor racing careers. His wife Lisa (sister of Mike Thackwell) also raced. His son Sam Brabham and nephew Matthew Brabham now race in junior formulae.

Lisa Jane Brabham (née Thackwell) was born in 1964 or 1965 in New Zealand and moved with her family to Perth, Western Australia at an early age. The family then moved to England in 1976 when she was eleven. She first drove a racing car, a Renault 5 Cup, aged 21 through her father (Ray Thackwell)'s business connections. After one season in Renault 5, she switched to the Honda CRX Challenge with Edenbridge Racing. She raced in the British Rover GTi Championship in 1992. Brabham and Thackwell married in 1993. She was still racing in 1994 but appears to have retired soon after. They have two sons – Sam and Finn.

== Racing record ==
=== Career summary ===
Season	Series	Position	Car	Team
1985	Goodyear Car Owners Club Laser Series	6th	Ford KB Laser	D Brabham
1986	Motorcraft Formula Ford "Driver to Europe" Series	5th	Van Diemen RF85 Ford	D Brabham
1987	Australian Drivers' Championship	**1st**	Ralt RT30 Volkswagen	Australian Motor Racing
1987	Australian Formula 2 Championship	12th	Ralt RT30 Volkswagen	Australian Motor Racing
1987	Motorcraft Formula Ford Driver to Europe Series	12th	Van Diemen RF86	D Brabham
1988	British Formula 3 Championship Class B	**3rd**	Ralt RT31 Volkswagen	Jack Brabham Racing
1989	British Formula 3 Championship	**1st**	Ralt RT31 Volkswagen	Jack Brabham Racing
1989	Macau Grand Prix	**1st**	Ralt RT33 Volkswagen	
1990	Formula One World Championship	NC	Brabham BT59 Judd	Motor Racing Developments
1990	Australian Endurance Championship	17th	Ford Sierra RS500	Benson & Hedges Racing
1991	World Sportscar Championship	18th	Jaguar XJR-14	Silk Cut Jaguar
1992	World Sportscar Championship	10th	Toyota TS010	Toyota Team TOM's
1994	Formula One World Championship	NC	Simtek S941 Ford	Simtek
1995	British Touring Car Championship	13th	BMW 318i	Schnitzer Motorsport
1996	All-Japan GT Championship	**1st**	McLaren F1 GTR BMW	Team Lark
1997	FIA GT Championship	23rd	Panoz Esperante GTR-1 Ford	David Price Racing
1998	FIA GT Championship	11th	Panoz Esperante GTR-1 Ford	DAMS
1999	American Le Mans Series	**2nd**	Panoz Esperante GTR-1 Ford; Panoz LMP-1 Roadster-S Ford	Panoz Motor Sports
1999	Shell Championship Series	54th	Holden VT Commodore	Wayne Gardner Racing
2000	American Le Mans Series	7th	Panoz LMP-1 Roadster-S Ford	Panoz Motor Sports
2001	American Le Mans Series	7th	Panoz LMP07 Élan; Panoz LMP-1 Roadster-S Élan	Panoz Motor Sports
2001	European Le Mans Series	11th	Panoz LMP07 Élan	Panoz Motor Sports
2002	American Le Mans Series	6th	Panoz LMP01 Evo Élan	Panoz Motor Sports
2003	American Le Mans Series (GTS Class)	**3rd**	Ferrari 550-GTS Maranello	Prodrive
2003	American Le Mans Series (LMP900 Class)	21st	Bentley EXP Speed 8	Team Bentley
2003	V8 Supercar Championship Series	46th	Ford BA Falcon	Dick Johnson Racing
2004	American Le Mans Series (GTS Class)	7th	Saleen S7-R Ford; Lamborghini Murciélago R-GT	ACEMCO Motorsports; Krohn-Barbour Racing
2004	Le Mans Endurance Series (LMP1 Class)	28th	Zytek 04S	Zytek Engineering
2005	American Le Mans Series (GT1 Class)	11th	Aston Martin DBR9	Aston Martin Racing
2005	V8 Supercar Championship Series	36th	Ford BA Falcon	Ford Performance Racing
2006	American Le Mans Series (GT2 Class)	5th	Panoz Esperante GT-LM	Multimatic Motorsports
2006	FIA GT Championship	31st	Aston Martin DBR9	Cirtek Motorsport
2007	American Le Mans Series (P2 Class)	9th	Acura ARX-01a	Highcroft Racing
2008	American Le Mans Series (P2 Class)	**3rd**	Acura ARX-01B	Highcroft Racing
2009	American Le Mans Series (P1 Class)	**1st**	Acura ARX-02a	Highcroft Racing
2009	Le Mans Series	21st	Peugeot 908 HDi FAP	Team Peugeot Total
2009	Australian Mini Challenge	NC	Mini JCW R56	BMW Uber Star
2010	American Le Mans Series (LMP Class)	**1st**	HPD ARX-01C	Highcroft Racing
2011	FIA GT1 World Championship	10th	Nissan GT-R	Sumo Power GT
2011	International V8 Supercars Championship	54th	Ford FG Falcon	Stone Brothers Racing
2012	FIA World Endurance Championship	10th	HPD ARX-03a	JRM
2013	Scirocco R China Masters Challenge	5th	Volkswagen Scirocco R-Cup	
2013	American Le Mans Series (LMP2 Class)	10th	HPD ARX-03b	Extreme Speed Motorsports
2013	International V8 Supercars Championship	59th	Mercedes-Benz E63 AMG	James Rosenberg Racing
2014	United SportsCar Championship	33rd	HPD ARX-03b	Extreme Speed Motorsports
2015	FIA World Endurance Championship	18th	HPD ARX-03b	Extreme Speed Motorsports
2019	Britcar Endurance Championship	NC	Brabham BT62	Brabham Automotive
2021	GT2 European Series - Pro-Am	10th	Brabham BT62	High Class Racing
2024	GT Cup Championship - Group GTO		Brabham BT62	Kendall Developments
2025	GT Cup Championship - Group GTO	**1st**	McLaren 720s GT3	SBR Engineering

=== Complete British Formula Three Championship results ===
(key) (Races in bold indicate pole position) (Races in italics indicate fastest lap)

Year	Entrant	Engine	Class	1	2	3	4	5	6	7	8	9	10	11	12	13	14	15	16	17	18	DC	Pts
1988	Jack Brabham Racing	VW	N	THR	SIL	THR	BRH	DON	SIL	BRH; 11	THR	SIL	DON	SIL	SNE; 6	OUL; 11	SIL; 22	BRH; 15	SPA; 8	THR; 7	SIL; 9	3rd	58
1989	Bowman Racing	VW	A	THR; DNS	DON; C	**SIL**; 1	BRH; 1	SIL; 3	BRH; 1	THR; 3	SIL; 3	DON; 22	**SIL**; 2	**SNE**; 11	**OUL**; 1	**SIL**; 1	BRH; 2	**DON**; Ret	SIL; 1	THR; Ret		1st	80

=== Complete Formula One results ===
(key)

Year	Entrant	Chassis	Engine	1	2	3	4	5	6	7	8	9	10	11	12	13	14	15	16	WDC	Pts
1990	Motor Racing Developments	Brabham BT59	Judd EV 3.5 V8	USA	BRA	SMR; DNQ	MON; Ret	CAN; DNQ	MEX; Ret	FRA; 15	GBR; DNQ	GER; Ret	HUN; DNQ	BEL; Ret	ITA; DNQ	POR; Ret	ESP; DNQ	JPN; Ret	AUS; Ret	NC	0
1994	MTV Simtek Ford	Simtek S941	Ford HBD6 3.5 V8	BRA; 12	PAC; Ret	SMR; Ret	MON; Ret	ESP; 10	CAN; 14	FRA; Ret	GBR; 15	GER; Ret	HUN; 11	BEL; Ret	ITA; Ret	POR; Ret	EUR; Ret	JPN; 12	AUS; Ret	NC	0

=== Complete International Formula 3000 results ===
(key) (Races in bold indicate pole position) (Races in italics indicate fastest lap)

Year	Entrant	Chassis	Engine	1	2	3	4	5	6	7	8	9	10	Pos.	Pts
1991	Roni Team Ralt	Ralt RT23	Cosworth	VAL; 7	PAU; 7	JER; 11	MUG; 9	PER	HOC	BRH	SPA	BUG	NOG	NC	0

=== 12 Hours of Sebring results ===
Year	Team	Co-drivers	Car	Class	Laps	Pos.	Class pos.
1992	(United Kingdom) Bud Light/Jaguar Racing	(United States) Davy Jones	Jaguar XJR-12D	GTP	338	4th	4th
1998	(United States) Panoz Motorsports	(United Kingdom) Andy Wallace	Panoz GTR-1	GT1	318	**2nd**	**1st**
1999	(United States) Panoz Motor Sports	(France) Éric Bernard	Panoz GTR-1	LMP	103	DNF	DNF
2000	(United States) Panoz Motor Sports	(Denmark) Jan Magnussen (France) Pierre-Henri Raphanel	Panoz LMP-1 Roadster-S	LMP	249	DNF	DNF
2001	(United States) Panoz Motor Sports	(Denmark) Jan Magnussen	Panoz LMP07	LMP900	109	DNF	DNF
2002	(United States) Panoz Motor Sports	(Denmark) Jan Magnussen (Belgium) Eric van de Poele	Panoz LMP01 Evo	LMP900	56	DNF	DNF
2003	(United Kingdom) Team Bentley	(United Kingdom) Johnny Herbert (United Kingdom) Mark Blundell	Bentley Speed 8	LMGTP	363	**3rd**	**1st**
2004	(United States) ACEMCO Motorsports	(United States) Terry Borcheller (United Kingdom) Johnny Mowlem	Saleen S7-R	GTS	257	25th	**3rd**
2005	(United Kingdom) Aston Martin Racing	(United Kingdom) Darren Turner (Monaco) Stéphane Ortelli	Aston Martin DBR9	GT1	338	4th	**1st**
2006	(Canada) Multimatic Motorsports Team Panoz	(Canada) Scott Maxwell (France) Sébastien Bourdais	Panoz Esperante GT-LM	GT2	320	9th	**1st**
2007	(United States) Highcroft Racing	(Sweden) Stefan Johansson (United States) Duncan Dayton	Acura ARX-01a	LMP2	346	6th	4th
2008	(United States) Patrón Highcroft Racing	(United States) Scott Sharp (Sweden) Stefan Johansson	Acura ARX-01B	LMP2	349	5th	4th
2009	(United States) Patrón Highcroft Racing	(United States) Scott Sharp (United Kingdom) Marino Franchitti	Acura ARX-02a	LMP1	302	DNF	DNF
2010	(United States) Patrón Highcroft Racing	(France) Simon Pagenaud (United Kingdom) Marino Franchitti	HPD ARX-01C	LMP2	349	5th	**2nd**
2011	(United States) Highcroft Racing	(France) Simon Pagenaud (United Kingdom) Marino Franchitti	HPD ARX-01e	LMP1	332	**2nd**	**2nd**
2012	(United Kingdom) JRM	(United Kingdom) Peter Dumbreck (India) Karun Chandhok	HPD ARX-03a	LMP1	309	17th	6th
2013	(United States) Extreme Speed Motorsports	(United States) Scott Sharp (United States) Guy Cosmo	HPD ARX-03b	LMP2	281	37th	5th
2014	(United States) Extreme Speed Motorsports	(United States) Scott Sharp (United Kingdom) Ryan Dalziel	HPD ARX-03b	P	291	**2nd**	**2nd**

=== 24 Hours of Le Mans results ===
Year	Team	Co-drivers	Car	Class	Laps	Pos.	Class pos.
1992	(Japan) Toyota Team Tom's	(United Kingdom) Geoff Lees (Japan) Ukyo Katayama	Toyota TS010	C1	192	DNF	DNF
1993	(United Kingdom) TWR Jaguar Racing	(Denmark) John Nielsen (United Kingdom) David Coulthard	Jaguar XJ220	GT	306	DSQ	DSQ
1996	(United Kingdom) Gulf Racing (United Kingdom) GTC Racing	(France) Pierre-Henri Raphanel (United Kingdom) Lindsay Owen-Jones	McLaren F1 GTR	GT1	335	5th	4th
1997	(United Kingdom) David Price Racing	(United Kingdom) Perry McCarthy (United States) Doc Bundy	Panoz Esperante GTR-1	GT1	145	DNF	DNF
1998	(United States) Panoz Motorsports	(United Kingdom) Andy Wallace (United Kingdom) Jamie Davies	Panoz Esperante GTR-1	GT1	335	7th	7th
1999	(United States) Panoz Motorsports	(France) Éric Bernard (United States) Butch Leitzinger	Panoz LMP-1 Roadster-S-Ford	LMP	336	7th	6th
2000	(United States) Panoz Motorsports	(Denmark) Jan Magnussen (United States) Mario Andretti	Panoz LMP-1 Roadster-S-Élan	LMP900	315	15th	8th
2001	(United States) Panoz Motorsports	(Denmark) Jan Magnussen (France) Franck Lagorce	Panoz LMP07-Élan	LMP900	85	DNF	DNF
2002	(United States) Panoz Motor Sports	(Denmark) Jan Magnussen (United States) Bryan Herta	Panoz LMP01 Evo-Élan	LMP900	90	DNF	DNF
2003	(United Kingdom) Team Bentley	(United Kingdom) Mark Blundell (United Kingdom) Johnny Herbert	Bentley Speed 8	LMGTP	375	**2nd**	**2nd**
2004	(United Kingdom) Zytek Engineering, Ltd.	(United Kingdom) Andy Wallace (Japan) Hayanari Shimoda	Zytek 04S	LMP1	167	DNF	DNF
2005	(United Kingdom) Aston Martin Racing	(France) Stéphane Sarrazin (United Kingdom) Darren Turner	Aston Martin DBR9	GT1	333	9th	**3rd**
2006	(Russia) Russian Age Racing (United Kingdom) Team Modena	(Spain) Antonio García (Brazil) Nelson Piquet Jr.	Aston Martin DBR9	GT1	343	9th	4th
2007	(United Kingdom) Aston Martin Racing	(United Kingdom) Darren Turner (Sweden) Rickard Rydell	Aston Martin DBR9	GT1	343	5th	**1st**
2008	(United Kingdom) Aston Martin Racing	(Spain) Antonio García (United Kingdom) Darren Turner	Aston Martin DBR9	GT1	344	13th	**1st**
2009	(France) Peugeot Sport Total	(Spain) Marc Gené (Austria) Alexander Wurz	Peugeot 908 HDi FAP	LMP1	382	**1st**	**1st**
2010	(United States) Highcroft Racing	(United Kingdom) Marino Franchitti (Germany) Marco Werner	HPD ARX-01C	LMP2	296	25th	9th
2012	(United Kingdom) JRM	(United Kingdom) Peter Dumbreck (India) Karun Chandhok	HPD ARX-03a	LMP1	357	6th	6th

=== Complete British Touring Car Championship results ===
(key) (Races in bold indicate pole position) (Races in italics indicate fastest lap)

Year	Team	Car	1	2	3	4	5	6	7	8	9	10	11	12	13	14	15	16	17	18	19	20	21	22	23	24	25	Pos	Pts
1995	BMW Motorsport Team	BMW 318i	DON; 1; 12	DON; 2; 12	BRH; 1; 4	BRH; 2; 6	THR; 1; 5	THR; 2 Ret	SIL; 1; 8	SIL; 2; 11	OUL; 1; 10	OUL; 2; 8	BRH; 1 Ret	BRH; 2; 10	DON; 1; 11	DON; 2; 11	SIL; 7	KNO; 1 DNS	KNO; 2; 4	BRH; 1 Ret	BRH; 2 Ret	SNE; 1; 16	SNE; 2; 17	OUL; 1; 11	OUL; 2 Ret	SIL; 1; 9	SIL; 2 Ret	13th	48

=== Complete Super Tourenwagen Cup results ===
(key) (Races in bold indicate pole position) (Races in italics indicate fastest lap)

Year	Team	Car	1	2	3	4	5	6	7	8	9	10	11	12	13	14	15	16	Pos.	Pts
1995	BMW Team Isert	BMW 318is	ZOL; 1	ZOL; 2	SPA; 1	SPA; 2	ÖST; 1	ÖST; 2	HOC; 1	HOC; 2	NÜR; 1; 15	NÜR; 2; 13	SAL; 1	SAL; 2	AVU; 1	AVU; 2	NÜR; 1	NÜR; 2	31st	22

=== Complete JGTC results ===
(key) (Races in bold indicate pole position) (Races in italics indicate fastest lap)

Year	Team	Car	Class	1	2	3	4	5	6	DC	Pts
1996	Team Lark McLaren	McLaren F1 GTR	GT500	SUZ; 2	FUJ; 1	SEN; 8	**FUJ**; 2	SUG; Ret	MIN; 4	**1st**	**63**

=== Complete GT1 World Championship results ===
Year	Team	Car	1	2	3	4	5	6	7	8	9	10	11	12	13	14	15	16	17	18	19	20	Pos	Pts
2011	Sumo Power GT	Nissan GT-R GT1	ABU; QR; 8	ABU; CR; 9	ZOL; QR; 11	ZOL; CR; Ret	ALG; QR; 3	ALG; CR; 3	SAC; QR; 8	SAC; CR; 5	SIL; QR; Ret	SIL; CR; Ret	NAV; QR; 4	NAV; CR; 3	PRI; QR; 9	PRI; CR; 4	ORD; QR; 3	ORD; CR; 7	BEI; QR; 11	BEI; CR; 8	SAN; QR; 7	SAN; CR; Ret	10th	75

=== Complete FIA World Endurance Championship results ===
Year	Entrant	Class	Chassis	Engine	1	2	3	4	5	6	7	8	Rank	Points
2012	JRM	LMP1	HPD ARX-03	Honda LM-V8 3.4 L V8	SEB; 12	SPA; 9	LMS; 5	SIL; 7	SÃO; 9	BHR; Ret	FUJ; 5	SHA; 5	10th	50.5
2014	Extreme Speed Motorsports	LMP2	HPD ARX-03b	Honda HR28TT 2.8 L Turbo V6	SIL	SPA	LMS	COA	FUJ	SHA; 5	BHR	SÃO	NC‡	0‡
2015	Extreme Speed Motorsports	LMP2	HPD ARX-03b	Honda HR28TT 2.8 L Turbo V6	SIL; 6	SPA	LMS	NÜR	COA	FUJ	SHA	BHR	18th	8

‡ As Brabham was a guest driver, he was ineligible for championship points.

=== IMSA SportsCar Championship results ===
(key)(Races in bold indicate pole position)

Year	Team	Class	Car	Engine	1	2	3	4	5	6	7	8	9	10	11	Rank	Points
2014	Extreme Speed Motorsports	P	HPD ARX-03b	Honda HR28TT 2.8 L V6 Turbo	DAY; 15	SEB; 2	LBH	LGA	DET	S6H	MSP	IMS	ELK	COA	PET	33rd	50

=== Complete Bathurst 1000 results ===
Year	Team	Car	Co-driver	Position	Laps
1993	Winfield Racing	Holden VP Commodore	(Sweden) Anders Olofsson	4th	159
1997*	BMW Motorsport Australia	BMW 320i	(Australia) Geoff Brabham	**1st**	161
1999	Wayne Gardner Racing	Holden VT Commodore	(Australia) Wayne Gardner	14th	157
2003	Dick Johnson Racing	Ford BA Falcon	(Brazil) Max Wilson	12th	158
2004	Dick Johnson Racing	Ford BA Falcon	(Australia) Owen Kelly	17th	157
2005	Ford Performance Racing	Ford BA Falcon	(Australia) Jason Bright	14th	152
2006	Ford Performance Racing	Ford BA Falcon	(New Zealand) Matt Halliday	DNF	56
2010	Stone Brothers Racing	Ford FG Falcon	(Australia) Alex Davison	13th	161
2011	Stone Brothers Racing	Ford FG Falcon	(Australia) Alex Davison	16th	161

* Super Touring race

=== Spa 24 Hours results ===
Year	Team	Co-drivers	Car	Class	Laps	Pos.	Class pos.
1991	(Japan) Team Zexel	(Japan) Naoki Hattori (Sweden) Anders Olofsson	Nissan Skyline R32 GT-R	A/Div.3	517	**1st**	**1st**
1992	(Japan) Nissan NISMO Racing	(Japan) Masahiro Hasemi (Sweden) Anders Olofsson	Nissan Skyline R32 GT-R	A+2.5	102	DNF	DNF
2005	(United Kingdom) Aston Martin Racing	(United Kingdom) Darren Turner (France) Stéphane Sarrazin	Aston Martin DBR9	GT1	555	6th	6th

=== Bathurst 24 Hour results ===
Year	Team	Co-drivers	Car	Class	Laps	Pos.	Class pos.
2002	(United Kingdom) Cirtek Motorsport	(Austria) Manfred Jurasz (Australia) Allan Grice (Australia) Darren Palmer	Porsche 996 GT3-RS	5	488	DNF	DNF
2003	(Austria) BE Racing	(Austria) Klaus Engelhorn (Italy) Andrea Montermini (Austria) Philipp Peter	Ferrari 360 N-GT	A	287	DNF	DNF

=== Complete Britcar results ===
(key) (Races in bold indicate pole position in class – 1 point awarded just in first race; races in italics indicate fastest lap in class – 1 point awarded all races;-

Year	Team	Car	Class	1	2	3	4	5	6	7	8	9	10	11	12	13	14	15	16	DC	CP	Points
2019	Brabham Automotive	Brabham BT62	1Inv	SIL; 1	SIL; 2	SIL; 1	SIL; 2	BRH; 1	BRH; 2	DON; 1	DON; 2	OUL; 1	OUL; 2	SNE; 1	SNE; 2	OUL; 1	OUL; 2	**BRH**; **1**; 1	BRH; 2 Ret	NC†	NC†	0†

† Brabham was ineligible for points as he was an invitation entry.

Sporting positions
Preceded by Graham Watson	Australian Drivers' Championship; Champion; 1987	Succeeded by Rohan Onslow
Preceded by JJ Lehto	British Formula Three Champion; 1989	Succeeded by Mika Häkkinen
Preceded by Enrico Bertaggia	Macau Grand Prix; Winner; 1989	Succeeded by Michael Schumacher
Preceded by Masahiko Kageyama	All-Japan Grand Touring Car Championship; GT500 Champion; 1996; With: John Nielsen	Succeeded by Pedro de la Rosa; Michael Krumm
Preceded by Craig Lowndes; Greg Murphy	Winner of the Bathurst 1000; 1997; With: Geoff Brabham	Succeeded by Rickard Rydell; Jim Richards
Preceded by Allan McNish; Rinaldo Capello; Tom Kristensen	Winner of the 24 Hours of Le Mans; 2009; With: Marc Gené & Alexander Wurz	Succeeded by Timo Bernhard; Romain Dumas; Mike Rockenfeller
Preceded by Lucas Luhr; Marco Werner	American Le Mans Series; Champion; 2009-2010; With: Scott Sharp (2009) & Simon Pagenaud (2010)	Succeeded by Guy Smith; Chris Dyson
Awards and achievements
Preceded by Tony Gaze	Sir Jack Brabham Award; 2012	Succeeded by Daniel Ricciardo; 2014
