= Brabham BT62 =

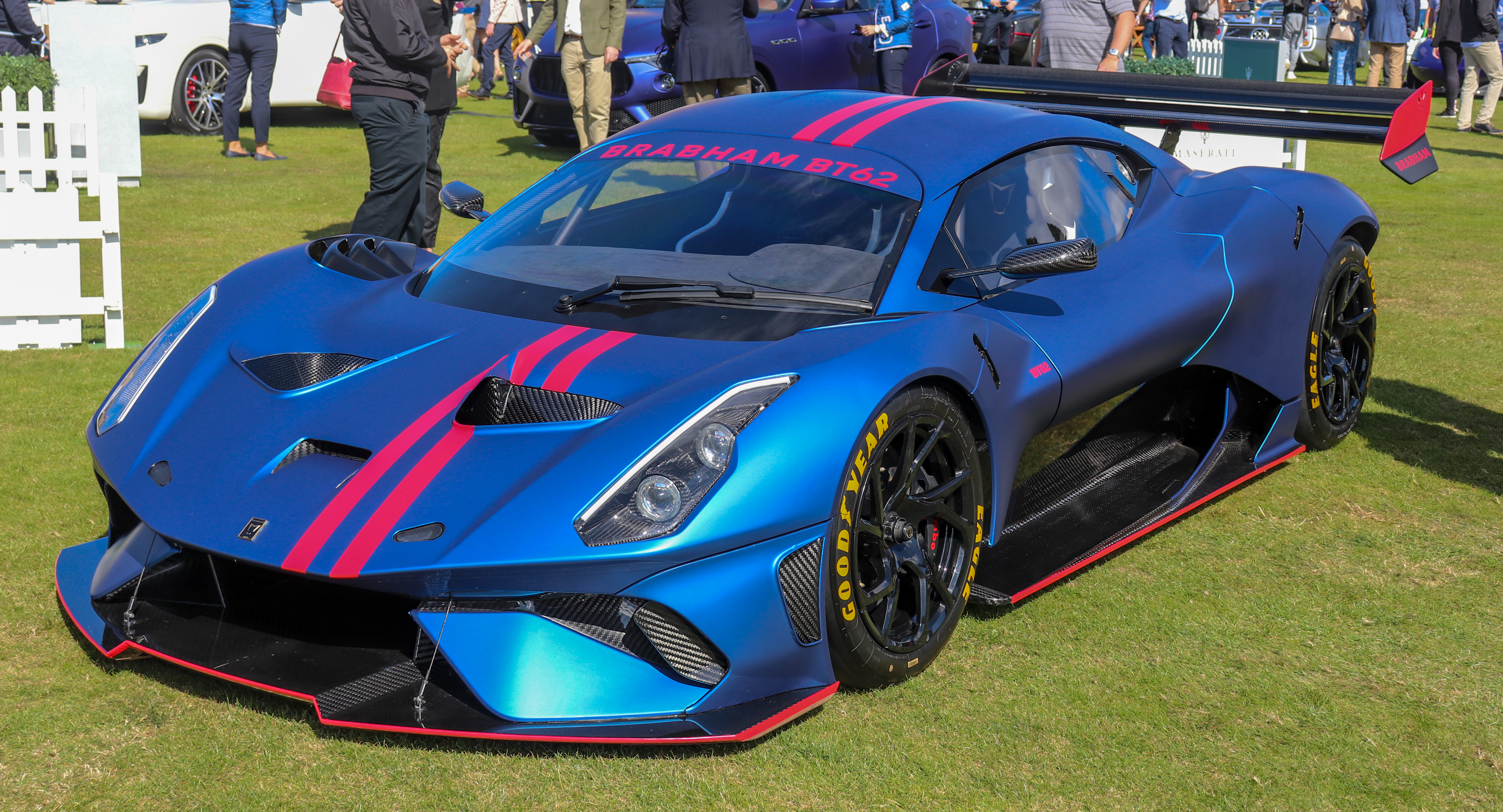

Overview
- Manufacturer: Brabham Automotive
- Production: 2018–2024
- Assembly: Adelaide, South Australia, Australia

Body and chassis
- Class: Track day car
- Body style: 2-door coupé
- Layout: Rear mid-engine, rear-wheel-drive

Powertrain
- Engine: 5.4 L Ford Modular naturally aspirated V8; 5.2 L Ford Modular naturally aspirated V8 (BT63)
- Transmission: 6-speed Holinger sequential manual

Dimensions
- Wheelbase: 2,695 mm (106.1 in)
- Length: 4,460 mm (175.6 in)
- Width: 1,950 mm (76.8 in)
- Height: 1,200 mm (47.2 in)
- Curb weight: 972 kg (2,143 lb) (competition); 1,100 kg (2,425 lb) (road car)

The Brabham BT62 is a mid-engine track-day car produced by Australian car manufacturer Brabham Automotive. It was introduced in 2018 with deliveries starting at the end of that year. A planned production of only 70 cars was intended, in honour of the company's 70 year heritage in racing.

== Specifications ==
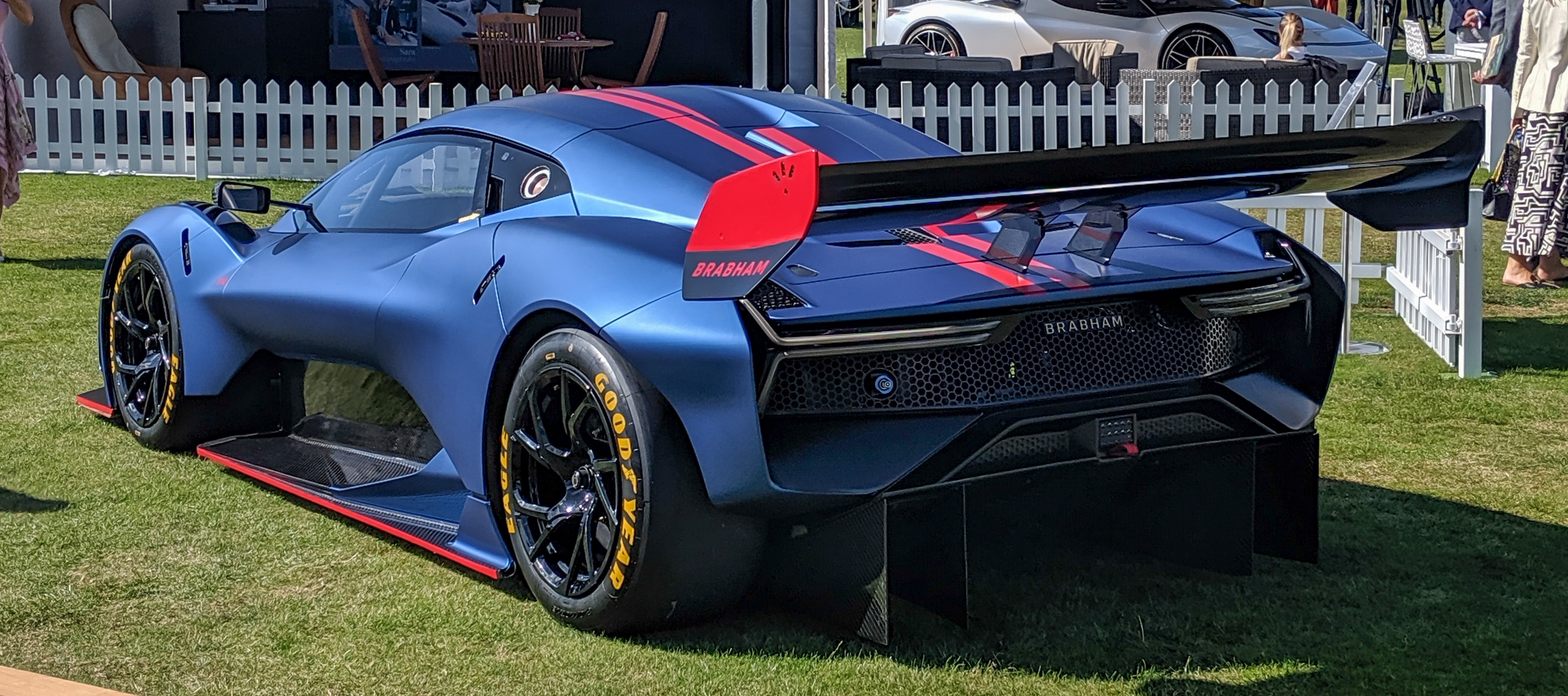
Rear view

The BT62 is powered by a mid-mounted 5.4-litre naturally-aspirated V8 engine that is based on the Ford V8 Modular engine architecture of American manufacturer Ford Motor Company. The engine has been extensively modified and has a power output of 515 kW (691 hp; 700 PS) at 7,400 rpm and 492 lb⋅ft (667 N⋅m) of torque at 6,200 rpm, giving the car a power-to-weight ratio of 653 hp per ton. Power goes to the rear wheels through a six-speed Holinger sequential-shift racing transmission controlled by steering wheel mounted paddle shifters, and stopping is handled by carbon-to-carbon disc brakes, with carbon pads actuated by six pistons acting on carbon rotors.

The chassis of the BT62 uses what Brabham calls a ‘tubular metallic architecture’ and the body features lightweight carbon fibre body panels, as well as carbon-kevlar wheel housings, to give the car a dry weight of 972 kg (2,142 lb). The car has a full fixed aero package as an option that includes a front splitter, rear diffuser and large rear wing, that are all made from carbon fibre and together are capable of producing 1,200 kg (2,645 lb) of downforce. The suspension uses a double wishbone setup in the front and rear and features pushrod actuated four-way adjustable Öhlins dampers and adjustable anti-roll bars. The wheels are 18 inch centre locking units and are wrapped in Michelin racing slicks.

The interior is relatively sparse as the BT62 is built for track day driving and features FIA-spec carbon fibre seat shells, a six-point harness, Alcantara trim, leather door pulls, an adjustable pedal box, a carbon fibre dashboard, a 12-inch digital gauge cluster, a removable carbon fibre steering wheel and a fire extinguisher.

== Production ==
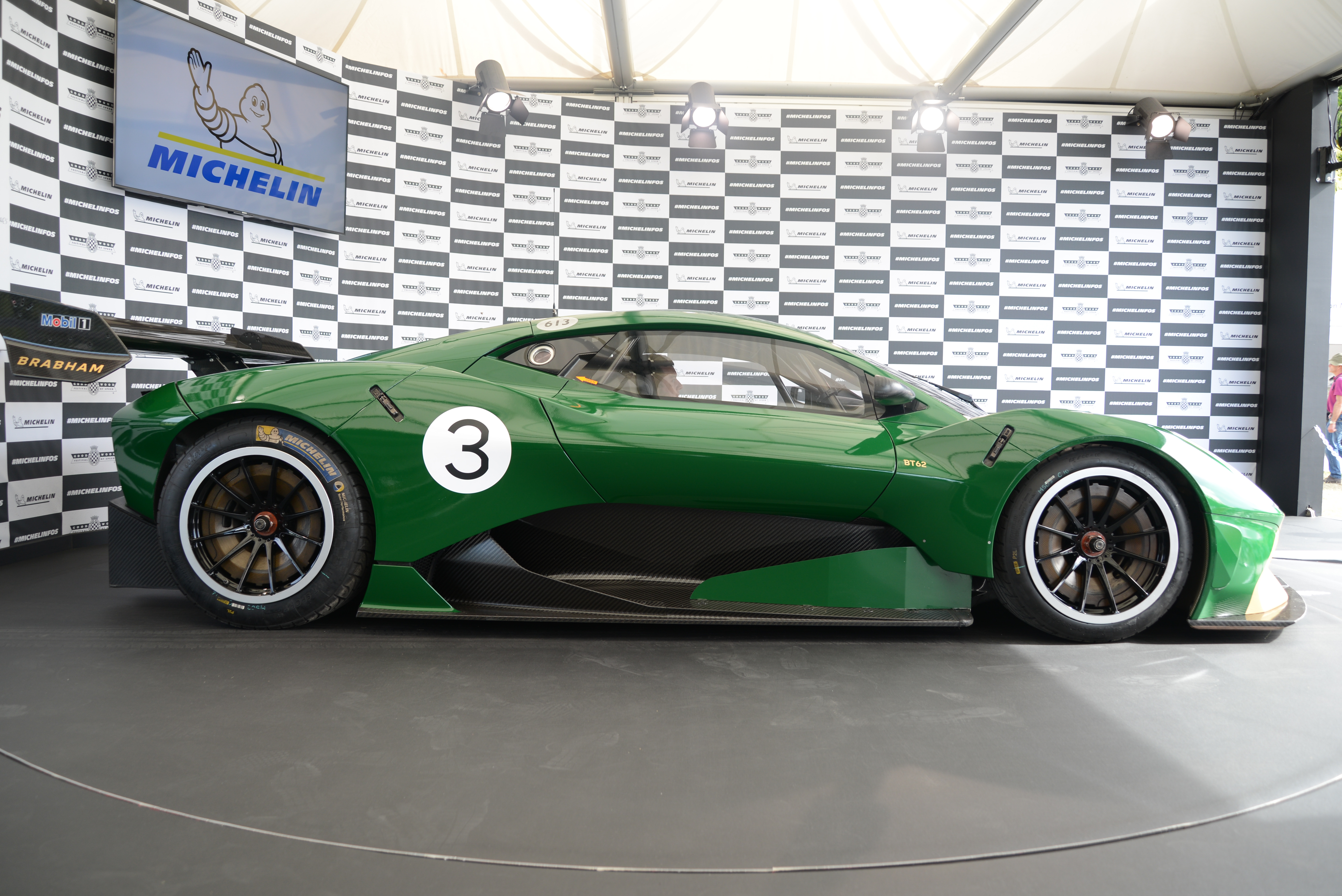
Brabham BT62

Brabham intended to produce 70 cars to celebrate the 70 years since the company founder Sir Jack Brabham launched his racing career in Australia in 1948. The first 35 cars will be finished in the corresponding liveries of Brabham's 35 Grand Prix winning cars, while the rest will be finished to the owner's specifications. The BT62 has a retail price of around US$1.4 million (around £1 million at current exchange rates). The price includes admission into the Brabham driver development programme, which offers personalised driver coaching sessions to help the owners make the most of their cars on the track. All production ceased in 2024, when Brabham closed its doors.

== Road-legal conversion ==
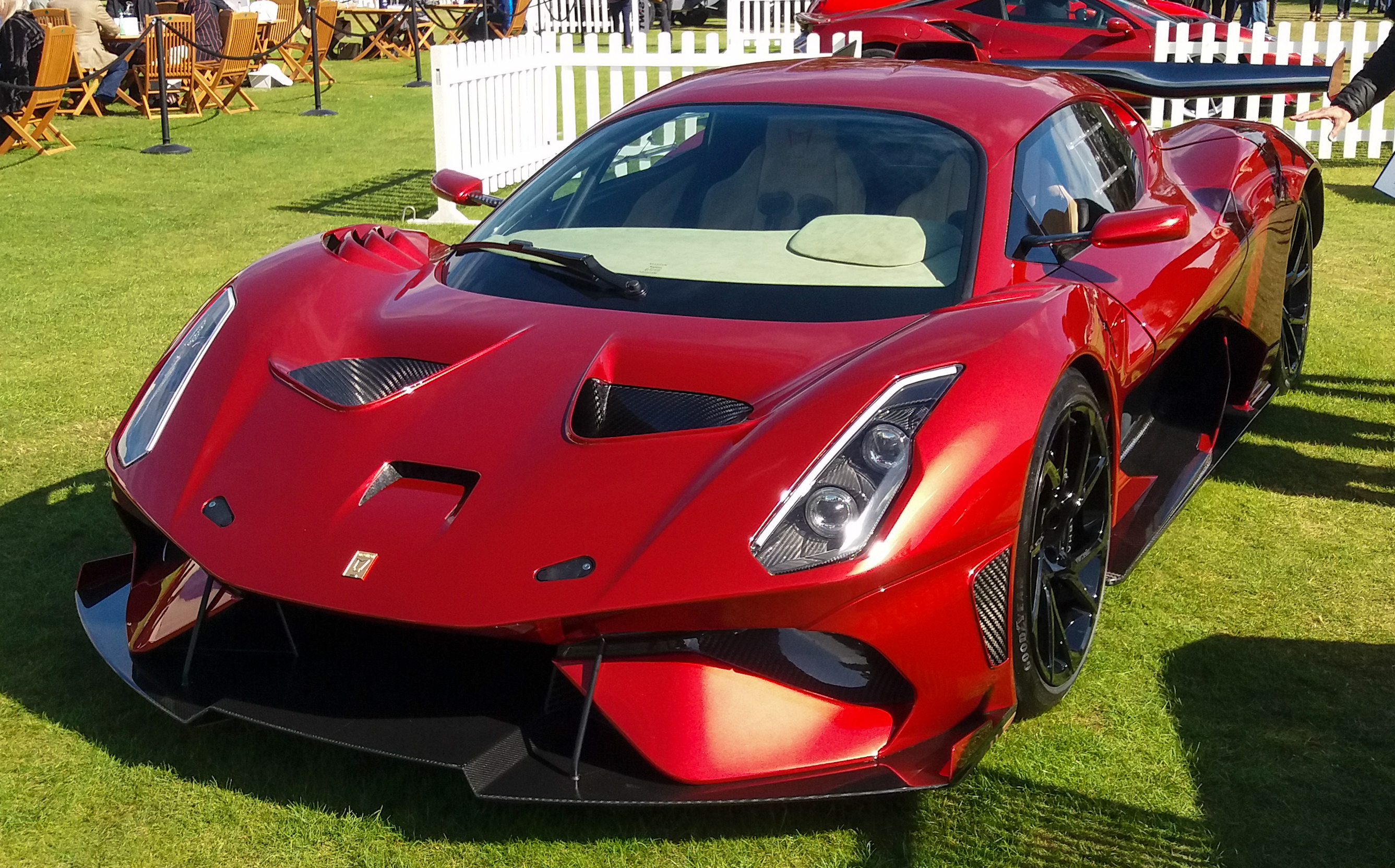
2020 Brabham BT62-R

Although the BT62 in its standard form is not road-legal, Brabham offers a road legal conversion to its customers known as the Brabham BT62-R with the conversion and registration process carried out in the UK after going through an IVA (Independent Vehicle Assessment). International buyers will supposedly still be able to carry out the procedure and be able to drive the car in other countries by having the car shipped back to the U.K. once every 12 months to Brabham for an annual service in order to comply with the registration laws. The shipping costs of the car would reportedly be borne by the company for every visit.

== Motorsport ==
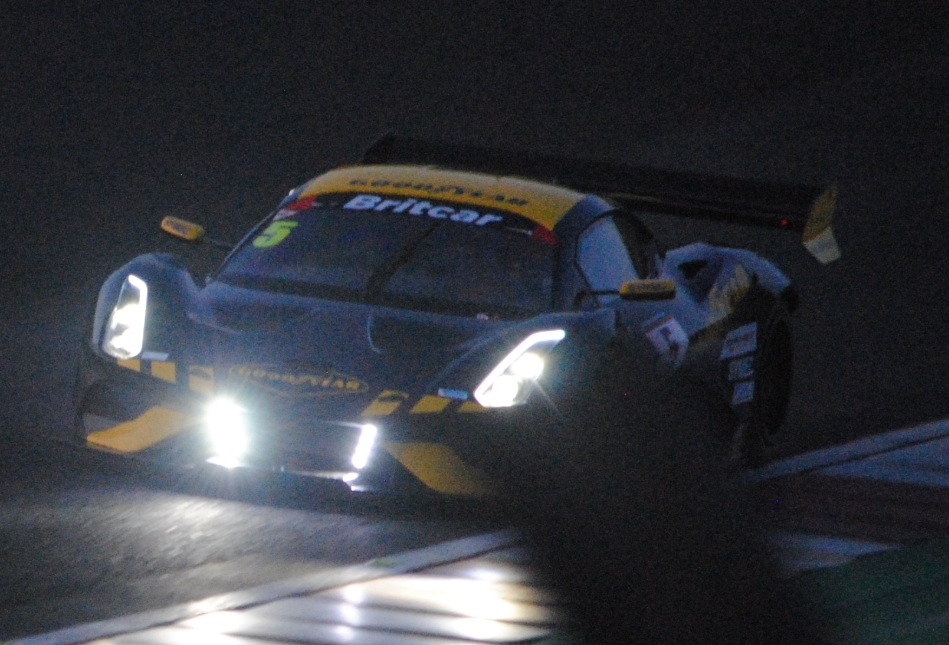
Will Powell driving the Brabham BT62 at Brands Hatch.

The BT62 made its racing debut in the infamous 'Into the Night' race at Brands Hatch, competing in the 2019 Britcar Endurance Championship on the 9th and 10 November. On the 21st of October, it was announced that David Brabham and Will Powell will pilot the car in the races. The car started from pole position in the first race and eventually won its first ever race outing. In the next race, on Sunday, Will Powell led the field away before a safety car came out. The BT62 pitted with an alternator problem, he rejoined the race initially but the car eventually retired, only completing 17 laps. The BT62 Competition ran in the 2020 Britcar Endurance Championship driven by reigning champion Paul Bailey, alongside British GT4 and Britcar champion Ross Wylie, who is also Brabham Automotive's development driver. This was the first customer-purchased BT62 to race in motorsport. In the South Island Endurance Series in New Zealand, owner Dwayne Carter and three-time Supercars Champion Shane van Gisbergen raced a Brabham BT62 at Euromarque Motorsport Park in a 3 hour endurance race, but had a right rear wheel come off on the second lap and returned to the track over 30 laps down an hour into the race, before retiring the car later on in the race before van Gisbergen could even turn a lap.

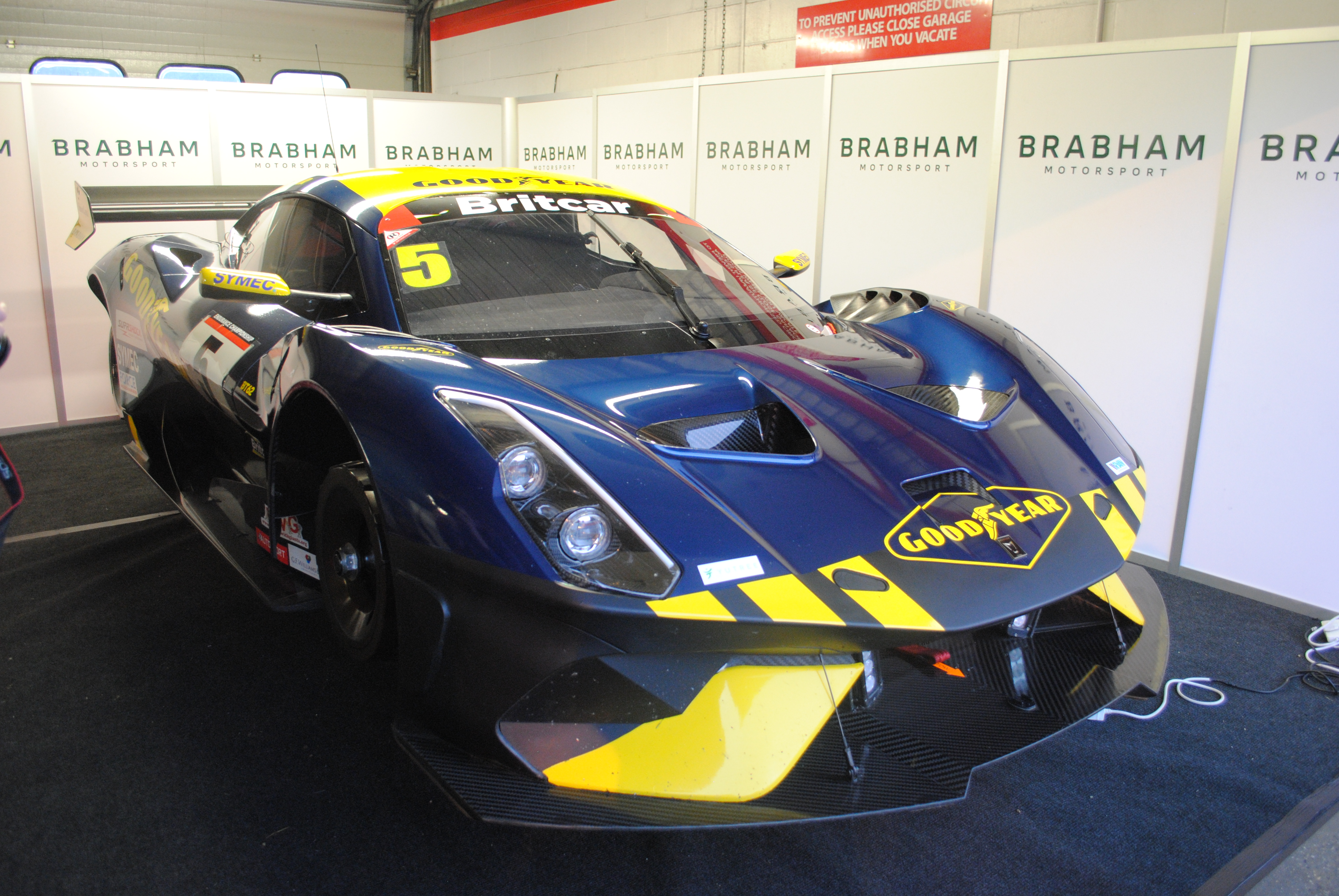
The front of the BT62 in the garage.

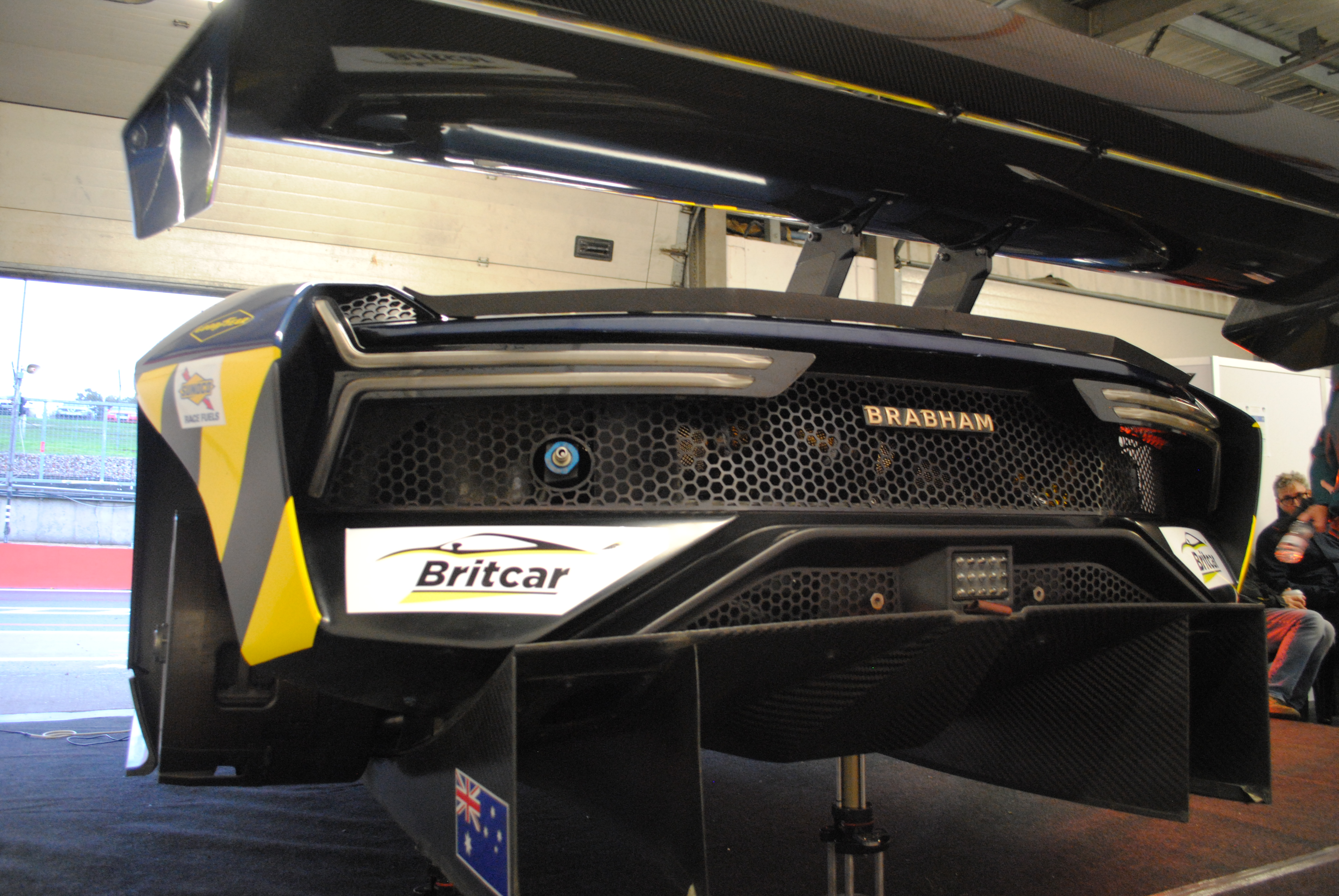
The rear of the BT62 in the garage.

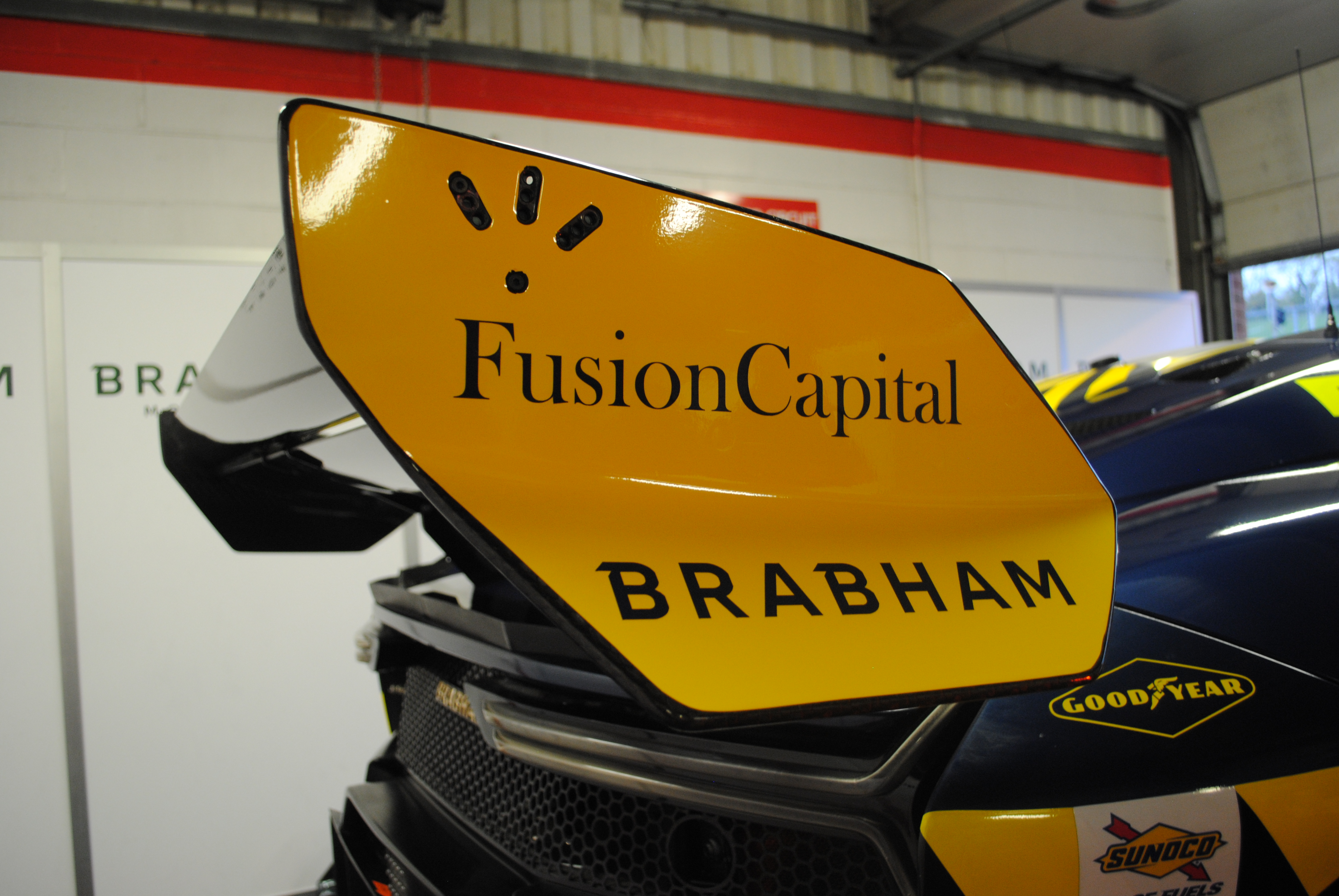
The rear wing of the BT62 in the garage.

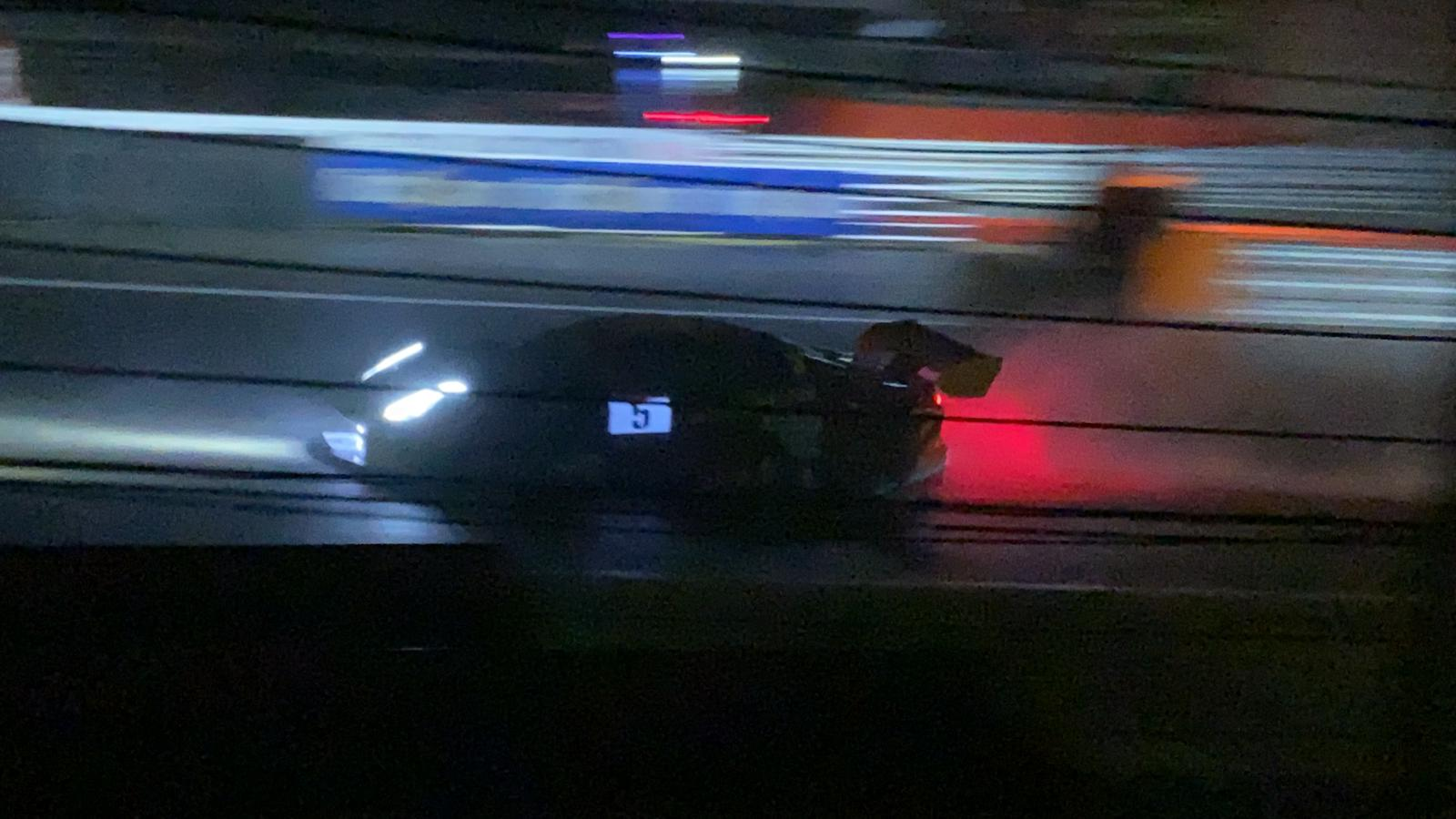
The BT62 on the Brabham Straight at Brands Hatch.

== Brabham BT63 ==
In 2021, a detuned evolution of the BT62 was announced as the BT63. The car is a racing specification car eligible for GT2 regulations. The engine capacity was reduced to 5.2 litres, with a reduced power output of 441 kW (591 hp; 600 PS) at 7,700 rpm and 490 lb⋅ft (664 N⋅m) of torque at 6,200 rpm. The car, known specifically as the Brabham BT63 GT2, is heavier, at over 1250 kg. The aim is to meet the requirements of a 2:1 power to weight ratio mandated by GT2 regulations. The BT63 made its racing debut at Circuit Paul Ricard on October 1, 2021 in the 2021 GT2 European Series run by High Class Racing.
