= LM GTE =

Former set of auto racing regulations

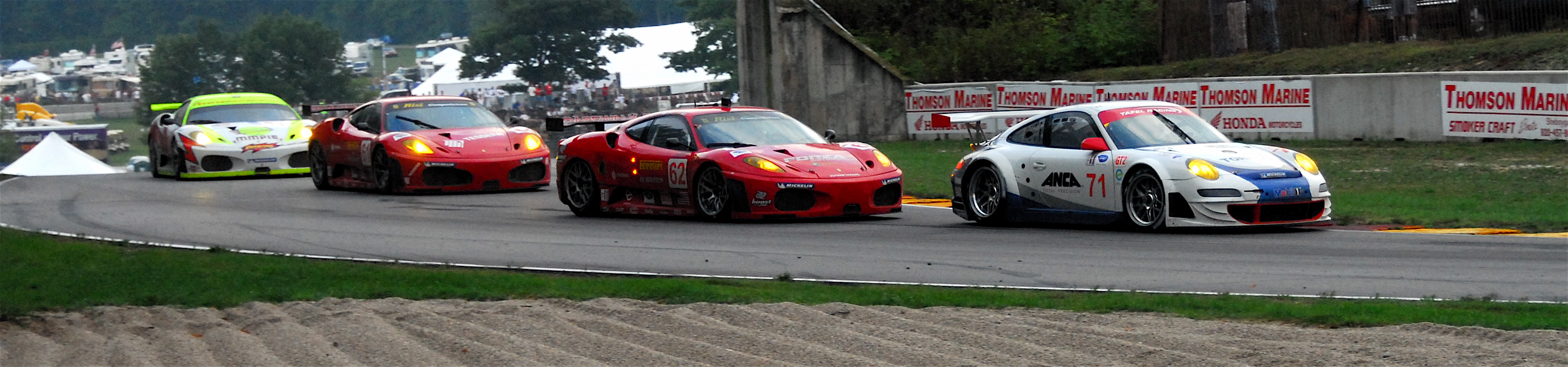
ALMS GT2 cars competing at Road America in 2007

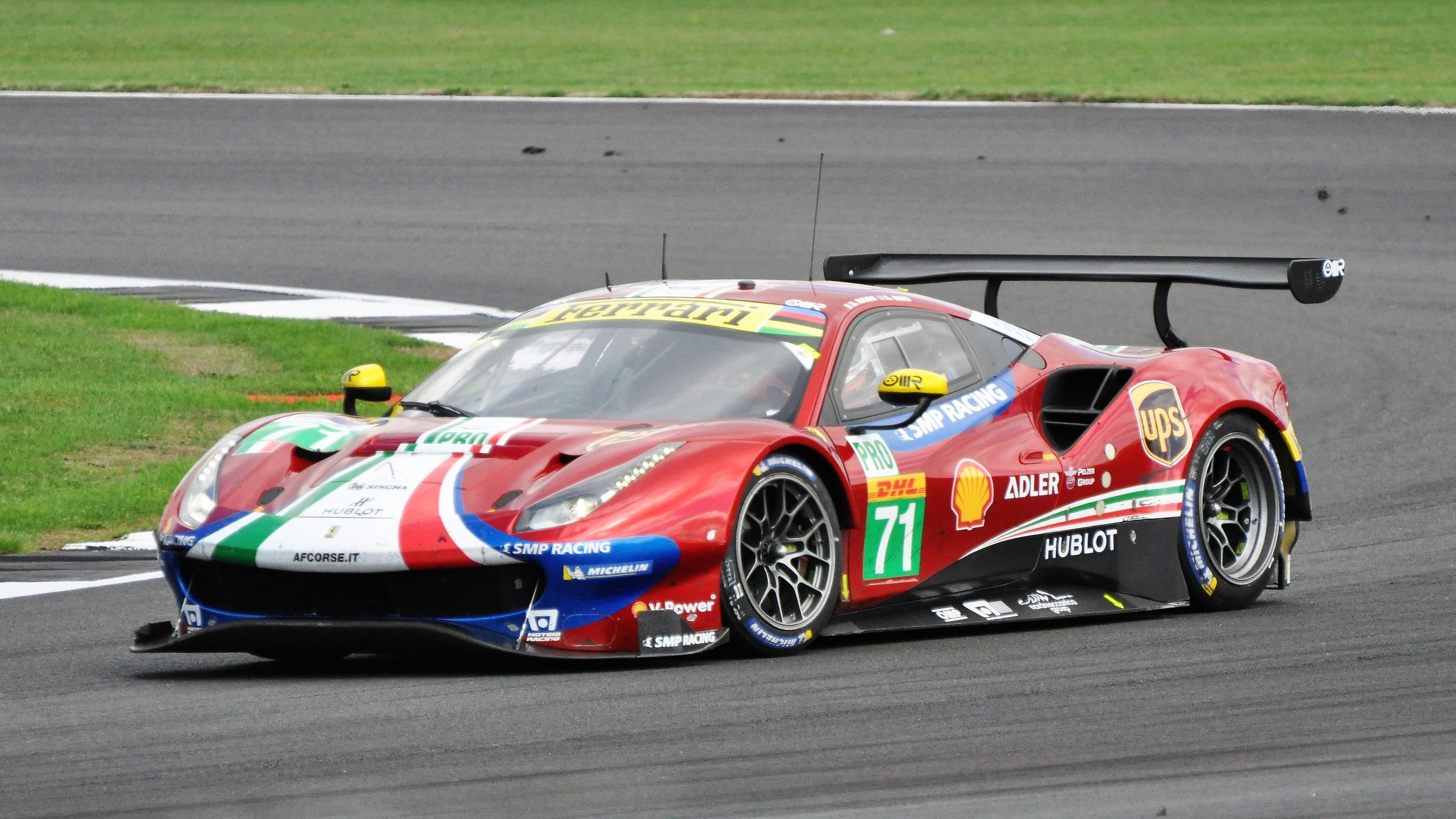
Ferrari 488 GTE Evo

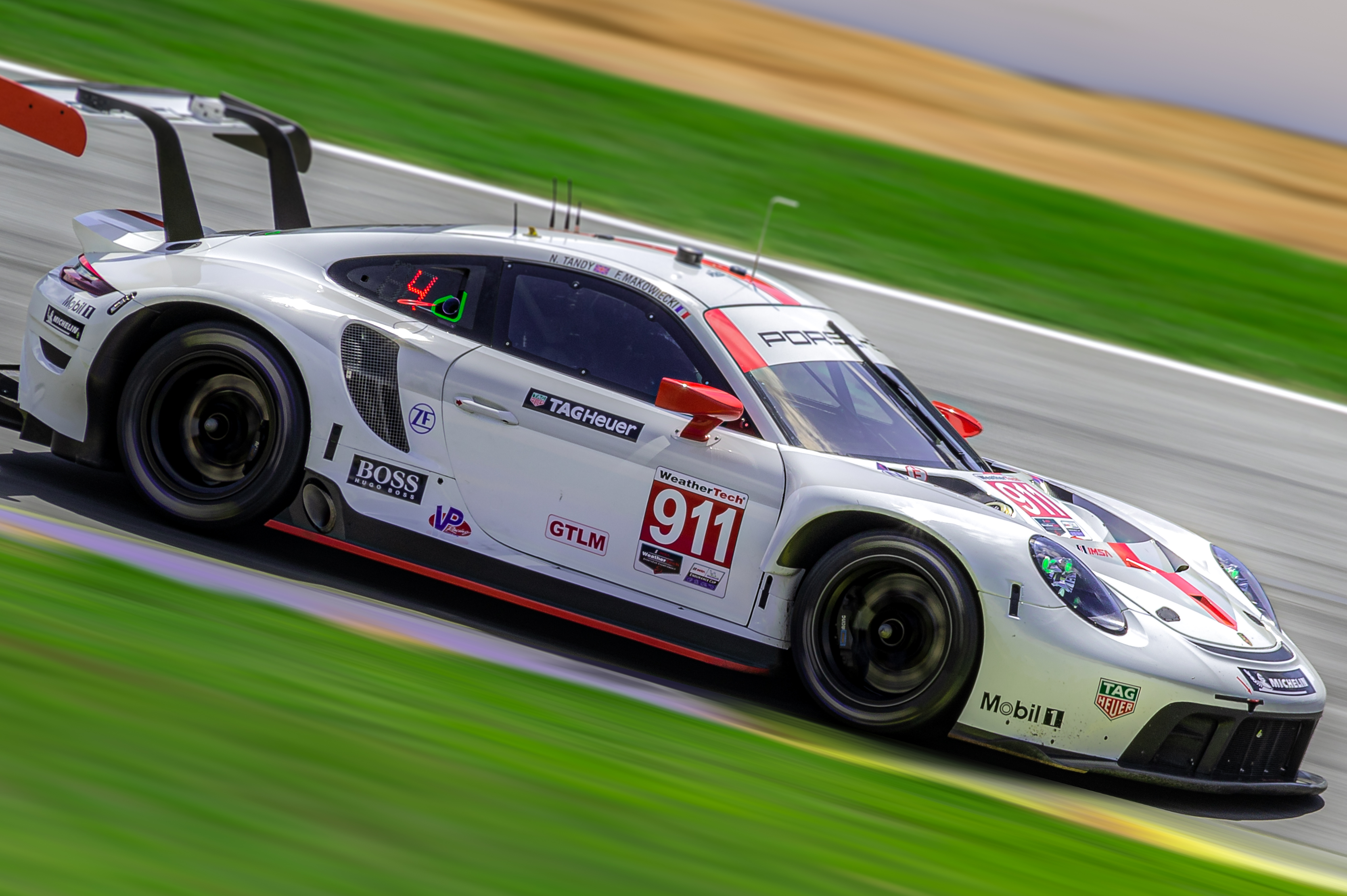
Porsche 911 RSR-19

Grand Touring Endurance, shortened to GTE, was a set of regulations maintained by the Automobile Club de l'Ouest (ACO) and IMSA for grand tourer racing cars used in the 24 Hours of Le Mans, 24 hours of Daytona GTLM, and its associated series. The class was formerly known as simply Group GT (Group N-GT in the FIA GT Championship) between 1999 and 2004, and later referred to as Group GT2 between 2005 and 2010. The GT2 name has since been revived for a different set of regulations.

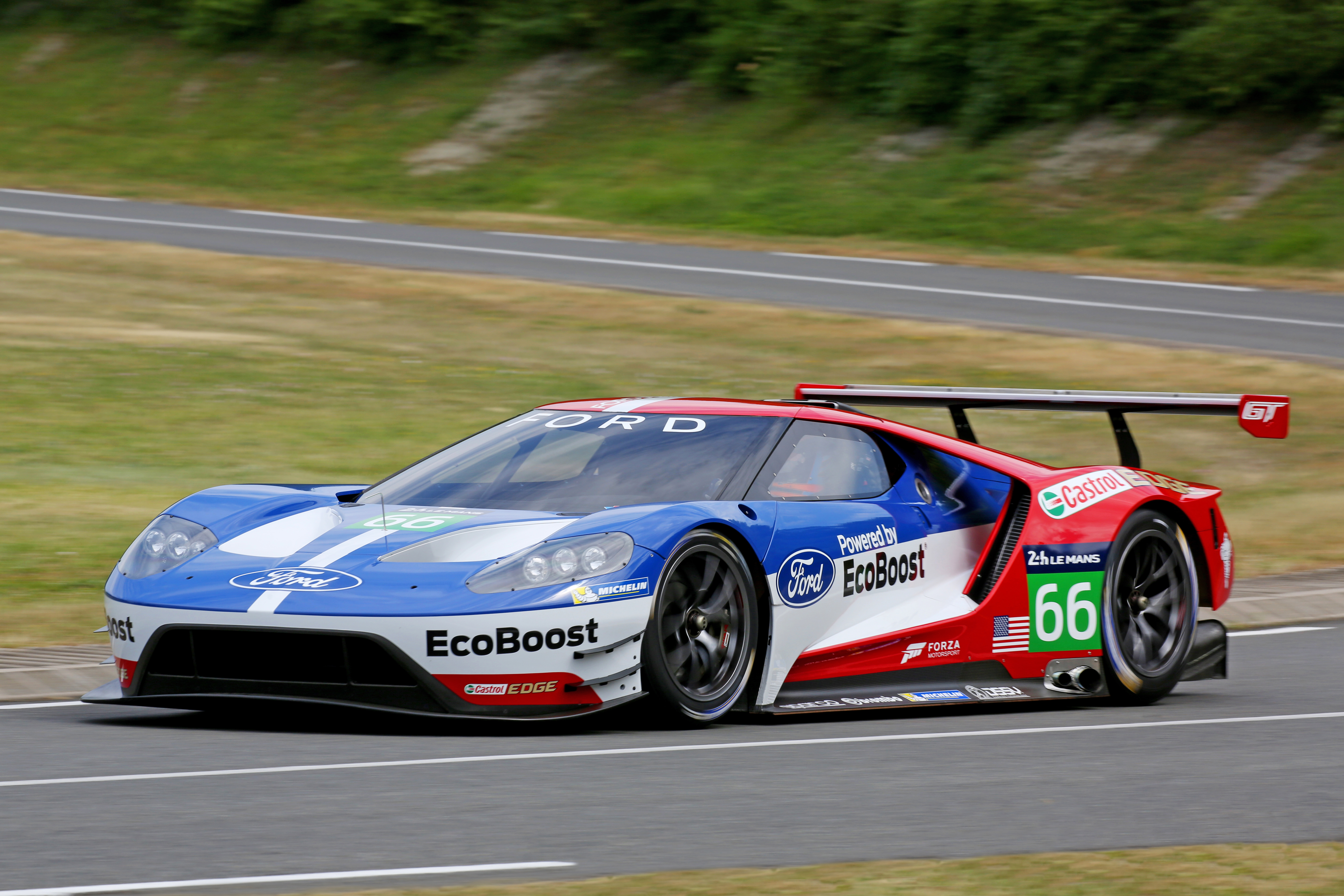
2nd-gen Ford GT

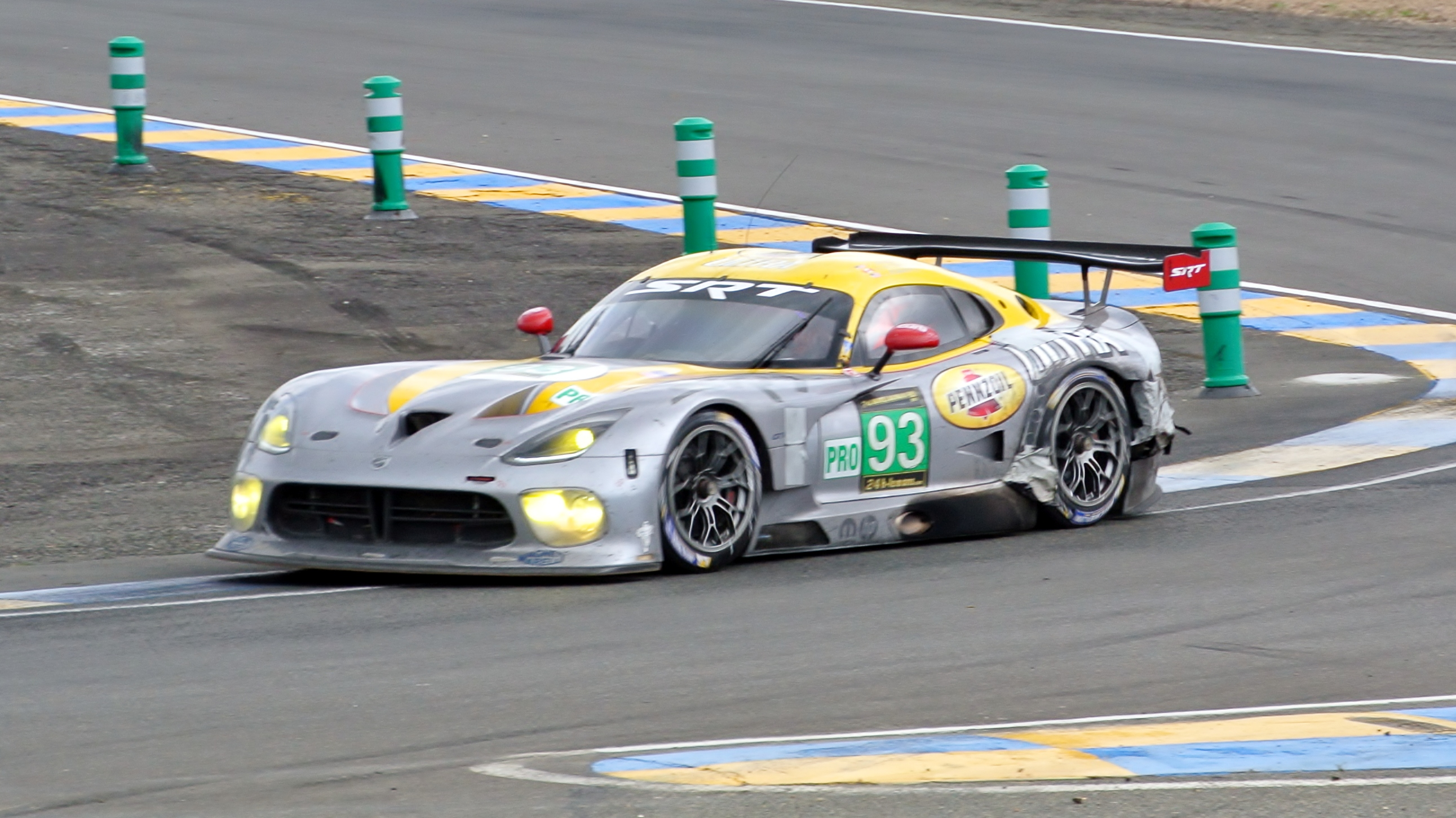
SRT Viper GTS-R

== History ==
The class, derived from the 1998-1999 GT3 class in 1998, debuted in 1999 under the name of 'GT' in 24 Hours of Le Mans, American Le Mans Series and European Le Mans Series, and as 'N-GT' in the FIA GT Championship, and in 2000 as 'GTU' in the Grand-Am Rolex Sports Car Series, and 'GTO' in the British GT Championship.

In 2005 the class was renamed GT2, below the faster GT1 class (formerly known as GT/GTS). Originally it was dominated by the Porsche 911 GT3 in its R, RS and RSR versions, but the Ferrari 360 Modena, Ferrari F430 and Panoz Esperante were also successful, as well as the BMW M3 in the United States. Other models entered were the Aston Martin V8 Vantage, Morgan Aero 8, Spyker C8 and TVR Tuscan.

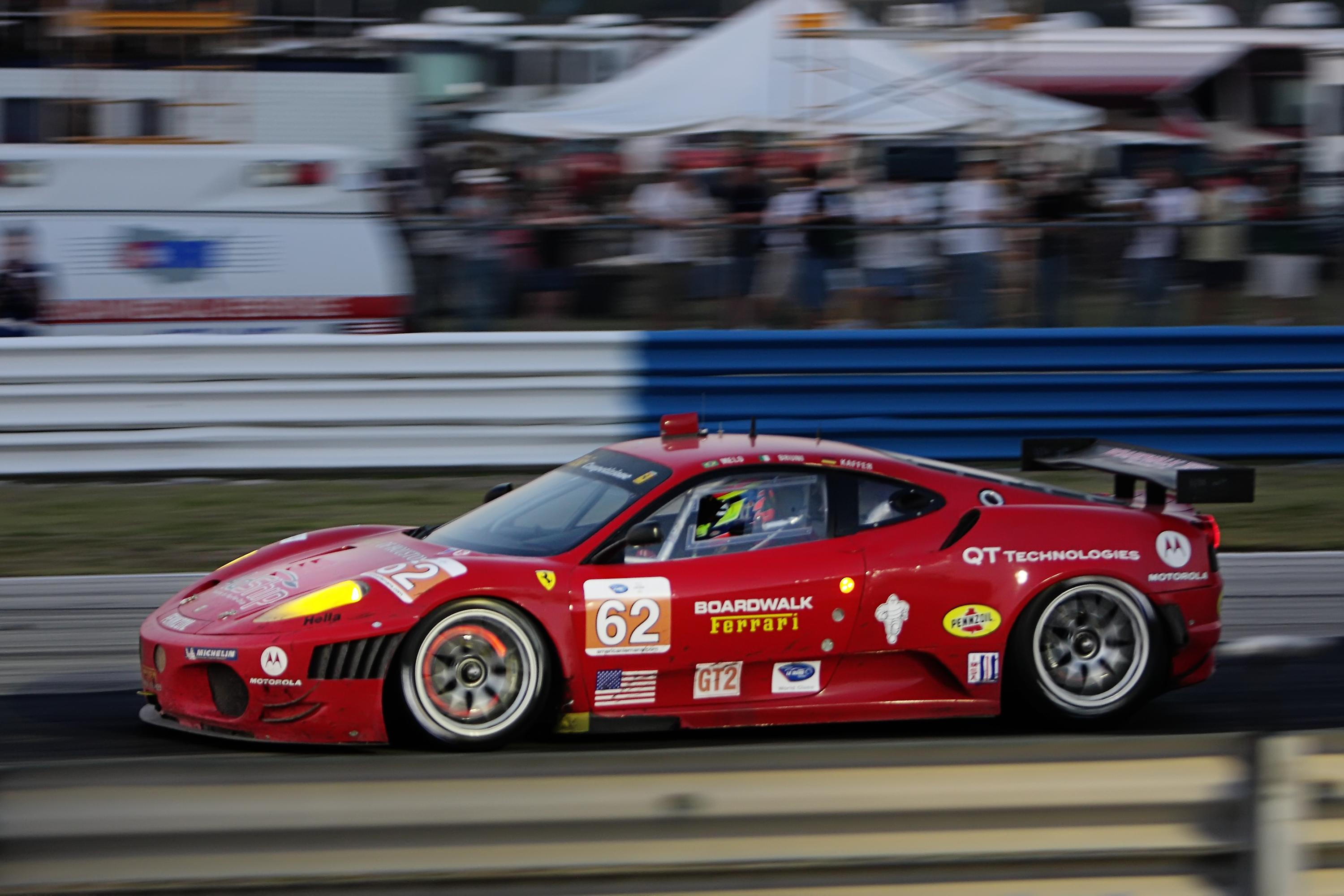
Ferrari F430 GT2

After the GT1 class was dropped from ACO competitions for the 2011 season, the GT2 class was renamed LM GTE in Europe and as GT in the United States. The new main rivals for the Porsche 911 were the Ferrari 458 Italia, Aston Martin V8 Vantage, Chevrolet Corvette, BMW M3, BMW Z4 (E89) and SRT Viper. Other less successful models in the early 2010s were the Jaguar XKR, Lamborghini Gallardo, Lotus Evora and Ford GT.

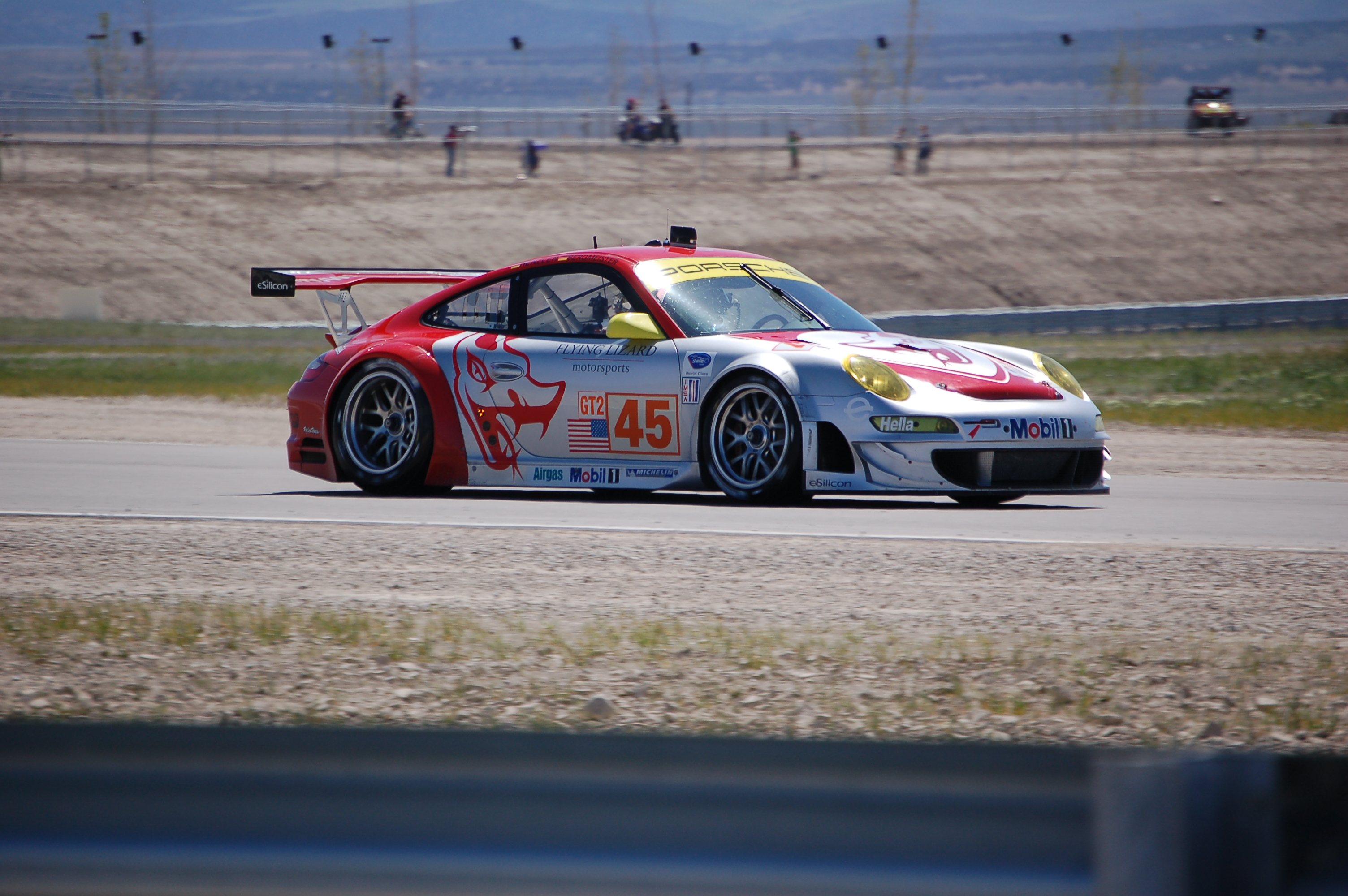
Flying Lizard Motorsport's 997 GT3-RSR (997) at the 2008 Utah Grand Prix

In 2015, the two dominant cars were the Porsche 911 RSR and the Ferrari 458 Italia GT2.

In the 2018/19 season the most competitive LM GTE cars were the Porsche 911 RSR, the Ferrari 488 GTE Evo and the Ford GT (by points scored).

In 2021, IMSA announced that the GTLM class would be replaced with a GT3-based 'GTD pro class'. The ACO also announced that GTE in the WEC would be replaced by GT3 in 2024, with the GTE Pro class seeing its final race in 2022 and the GTE Am class in 2023.

The final race for the GTE regulations saw the Iron Dames Porsche 911 RSR-19 take the win at the 2023 8 Hours of Bahrain with an all female driver lineup consisting of Sarah Bovy, Rahel Frey and Michelle Gatting.

== Regulations ==
Class plates of LM GTE categories

LM GTE Pro

LM GTE Am

The ACO had defined limits and requirements for the LM GTE category to ensure that cars were legitimately production-based. The car had to have "an aptitude for sport with 2 doors, 2 or 2+2 seats, opened or closed, which could be used perfectly legally on the open road and available for sale." The ACO modified its regulations for “small manufacturers” (less than 2000 cars produced a year). In order to be eligible, a big manufacturer must produce at least one car a week or a small manufacturer one car a month. The cars were eligible to race when 100 road cars for big manufacturers or 25 road cars for small manufacturers were produced. The car must have had an official launch campaign and sales network. The engine must have been used in a production car; while this is usually the engine from the road car, the ACO had made exceptions for cars like the BMW Z4 GTE which use engines from other models. Carbon fiber, titanium, and magnesium were banned except for special parts like spoilers or wheels. Cars with carbon cockpits (that are not directly attached to the suspension) were allowed. The engine displacement was limited to 5.5L naturally aspirated or 4.0L turbo/supercharged. The SRT Viper was granted a special waiver to 8.0L. The minimum weight was 1,245 kg (2744 lbs) including driver, fuel, helmet, and liquids. Cars had to have working lights and windshield wipers at all times. To distinguish from faster Le Mans Prototypes at night, LM GTE cars must use yellow headlights (not in WEC). Four-wheel drive was banned while engine-based traction control was allowed. Gearboxes were limited to six forward gears. All cars also had to have rear-view cameras in addition to side mirrors.

LM GTE
	LM GTE Pro	LM GTE Am
Minimum weight	1,245 kilograms (2,745 lb) (possibly subject to Balance of Performance) including driver, fuel, helmet and liquids	
Maximum length	4,800 millimetres (190 in)	
Maximum width	2,050 millimetres (81 in) (excluding rear view mirrors)	
Engine displacement	naturally-aspirated: 5.5 litres (340 in^{3}) forced-induction: 4.0 litres (240 in^{3})	
Fuel tank size	90 litres (24 US gal) (subject to BoP)	
Drivers	free composition	2 to 3 drivers, at least 1 Bronze plus 1 Bronze or Silver

Cars were allowed one set of modifications every two years. Brand new cars were allowed one extra set of modifications in the first year of competition. Small aerodynamic modifications were allowed for 24 Hours of Le Mans each year. If the road car was upgraded with a new part, that part could also be used on the LM GTE car through updating the homologation. Manufacturers could also apply for waivers to allow the homologation of cars or parts that would normally be banned by the rules.

Overall, the technical regulations were focused on keeping LM GTE cars relatively close to road cars in terms of parts and dimensions. Aerodynamic devices such as spoilers were heavily regulated. There were also minor requirements that were holdovers from the earlier era of Le Mans, such as requiring at least 150 cubic decimetres of luggage space.

At Le Mans, LM GTE was divided into two classes: GTE-Pro and GTE-Am. GTE-Am cars had to be at least one year old or be built to the previous year's spec, and had limits on the qualification of drivers allowed in the lineup.

The Endurance Committee of the ACO had the absolute right to modify the Balance of Performance between LM GTE cars through adjusting the weight, engine, or aerodynamics. Air restrictors were used with default values for specific engine capacities.

=== 2016 updates ===
At the 2015 24 Hours of Le Mans, the ACO announced a range of changes for the LM GTE class for the 2016 season. The aim of the changes was to increase the performance of the cars relative to the GT3-spec machinery that they competed against in certain series, whilst reducing cost and improving the safety of the cars. The regulations became restrictive, so there was a reduced reliance on waivers to allow certain cars to compete. One example of this was the increased freedom of aerodynamic development within specific regions of the car. The new cars were able to compete in LM GTE Pro from 2016 alongside the 'old' specification of the car, before becoming available for LM GTE Am in 2017. In 2018, the 'old' specification of the car was out of competition.

=== Replacement of GTE Regulations ===
Autosport magazine reported that on 20 August 2021 the ACO had announced that they would be dropping the GTE class in favour of GT3 cars from the 2024 season onwards. The GTE class was to remain in place for the 2022 and 2023 WEC seasons, including Le Mans, following the decline of GTE racing with only four cars in the WEC Championship and three in the IMSA SportsCar Championship in 2021.

== List of LM GTE cars ==
Manufacturer	Model	Developer	Photo	Year	Notes
(United Kingdom) Aston Martin	V8 Vantage GT2	Prodrive		2008–2011	
(United Kingdom) Aston Martin	V8 Vantage GTE	Prodrive		2012–2017	Fourth generation Vantage GTE, includes Vantage GTE upgrades for 2016
(United Kingdom) Aston Martin	V8 Vantage AMR GTE (AM6)	Prodrive		2018–2023	Fifth generation Vantage
(Germany) BMW	M3 GTR (E36)	Prototype Technology Group		1999–2000	Includes 2 and 4-door variants
(Germany) BMW	M3 GT (E46/2)	Prototype Technology Group		2000–2003	6-cylinder E46 M3
(Germany) BMW	M3 GTR (E46/2)	BMW Motorsport		2001–2006	Includes 6-cylinder version raced in ALMS in 2006
(Germany) BMW	M3 GT (E92)	BMW Motorsport		2009–2012	
(Germany) BMW	Z4 GTE (E89)	BMW Motorsport		2013–2015	
(Germany) BMW	M6 GTLM (F13)	BMW Motorsport		2016–2017	
(Germany) BMW	M8 GTE (F92)	BMW Motorsport		2018–2021	
(United States) Chevrolet	Corvette LM-GT (C5)	Pratt & Miller		2001–2005	
(United States) Chevrolet	Corvette ZR1 C6.R	Pratt & Miller		2009–2013	Includes upgrades to GTE spec in 2012
(United States) Chevrolet	Corvette C7.R	Pratt & Miller		2014–2019	Includes upgrades for 2016
(United States) Chevrolet	Corvette C8.R	Pratt & Miller		2020–2023	
(United States) Dodge SRT	SRT Viper GTS-R (VX I)	Riley Technologies		2012–2015	Includes upgrades in 2015
(Italy) Ferrari	360 N-GT (F131)	Michelotto Engineering SpA		2000–2002	
(Italy) Ferrari	360 GT (F131)	Michelotto Engineering SpA		2002–2004	
(Italy) Ferrari	360 GTC (F131)	Michelotto Engineering SpA		2004–2005	
(Italy) Ferrari	F430 GT (F131)	Michelotto Engineering SpA		2006–2007	
(Italy) Ferrari	F430 GTC (F131)	Michelotto Engineering SpA		2008-2010	
(Italy) Ferrari	458 Italia GT (F142)	Michelotto Engineering SpA		2011–2015	Includes upgrades to GTE spec in 2012
(Italy) Ferrari	488 GTE (F142M)	Michelotto Engineering SpA		2016–2017	
(Italy) Ferrari	488 GTE Evo (F142M)			2018-2023	
(United States) Ford	GT-R (Mk. VII)	Doran Enterprises		2008–2011	
(United States) Ford	GT (Mk. VIII)	Ford Performance		2016–2019	
(United Kingdom) Jaguar	XKR (X150)	RSR Racing		2010–2011	
(Italy) Lamborghini	Gallardo LP 560 GT2	Reiter Engineering		2009–2011	
(United Kingdom) Lotus	Evora GTE (Type 122)	Ycom		2011–2012	
(United States) Panoz	Esperante GT-LM	Panoz Auto Development		2003–2009	Includes Evo version introduced in 2008
(United States) Panoz	Abruzzi	Panoz Auto Development		2011	
(Germany) Porsche	911 GT3 R (996.I)	Porsche Motorsport		1999–2000	
(Germany) Porsche	911 GT3 RS (996.I)	Porsche Motorsport		2001–2003	
(Germany) Porsche	911 GT3 RSR (996.II)	Porsche Motorsport		2004–2005	
(Germany) Porsche	911 GT3 RSR (997)	Porsche Motorsport		2006–2012	997.I & 997.II generations 911 RSR. There were upgrades every year.
(Germany) Porsche	911 RSR (991.I)	Porsche Motorsport		2013–2016	First 991 generation 911 RSR, includes upgrades for 2016
(Germany) Porsche	911 RSR (991.II)	Porsche Motorsport		2017–2019	Second 991 generation 911 RSR
(Germany) Porsche	911 RSR-19 (991.II)	Porsche Motorsport		2019–2023	Third generation 911 RSR
(Netherlands) Spyker	C8 Double-12R	Reiter Engineering		2002–2003	
(Netherlands) Spyker	C8 Spyder GT2-R	Reiter Engineering		2005–2007	Includes upgrades introduced in 2007
(Netherlands) Spyker	C8 Laviolette GT2-R	Reiter Engineering		2008–2010	
(United Kingdom) TVR	Tuscan R	TVR Engineering Ltd		2001–2006	Unrelated to the Tuscan. Renamed T400R in 2003.

== See also ==
- Group GT3
- SRO GT2
- Automobile Club de l'Ouest
