= Brabham Automotive =

Australian car manufacturer

- Industry: Automotive
- Founded: 2018
- Founder: David Brabham
- Defunct: 2024
- Headquarters: Adelaide, South Australia
- Products: Brabham BT62
- Website: www.brabhamautomotive.com

Brabham Automotive was an Australian automaker launched by David Brabham and an Australian investor group, Fusion Capital in May 2018. Brabham Automotive was based in Adelaide, South Australia, with representation also in the United Kingdom.

Its first product was the Brabham BT62, which was initially launched as a track-only vehicle. In November 2019, the company announced a Competition version of the BT62 to coincide with its racing debut in the Britcar season finale at Brands Hatch.

Brabham Automotive's manufacturing base was in Edinburgh Parks, north of Adelaide.

In 2021, Brabham entered competition in the GT2 European Series with the BT63 GT2.

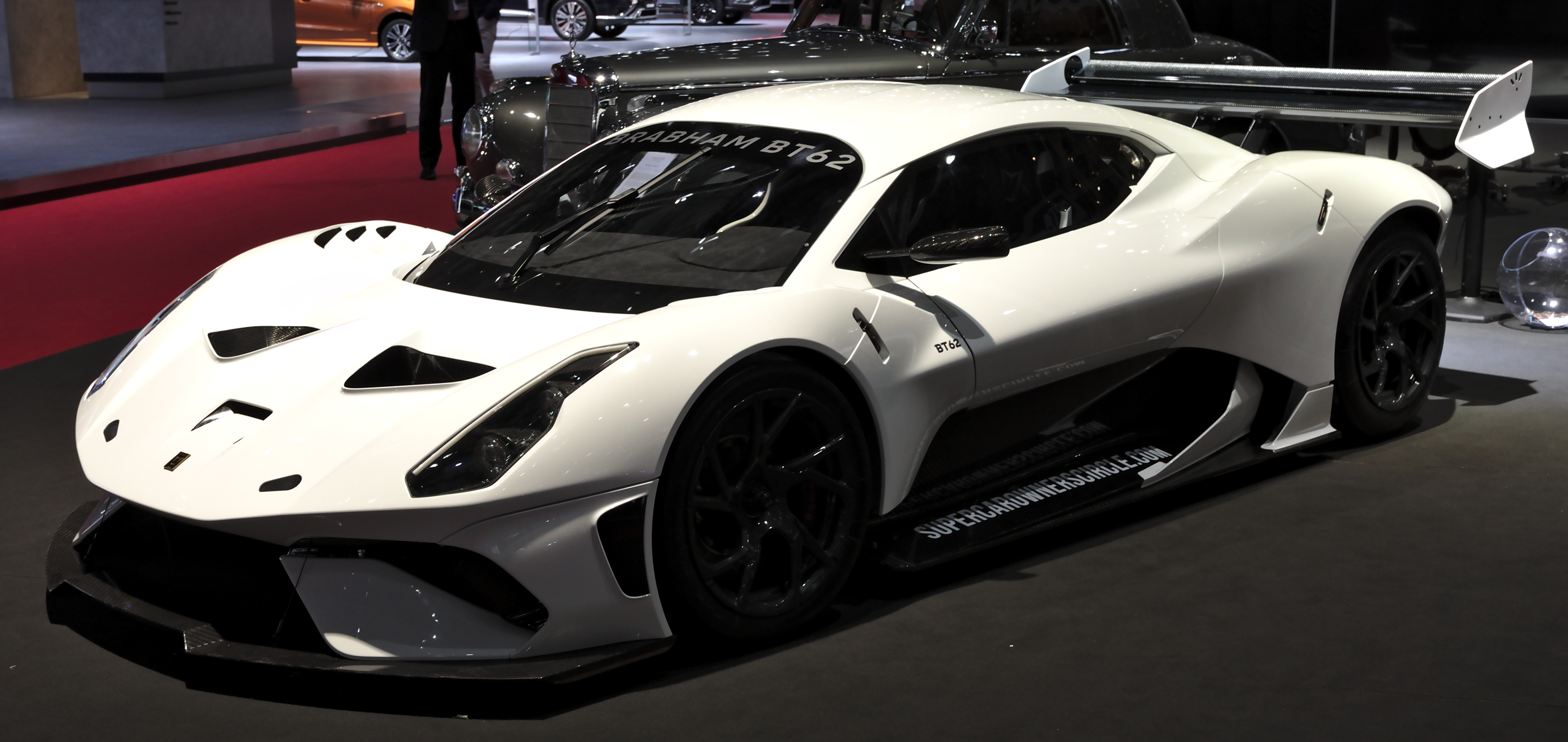
Brabham BT62

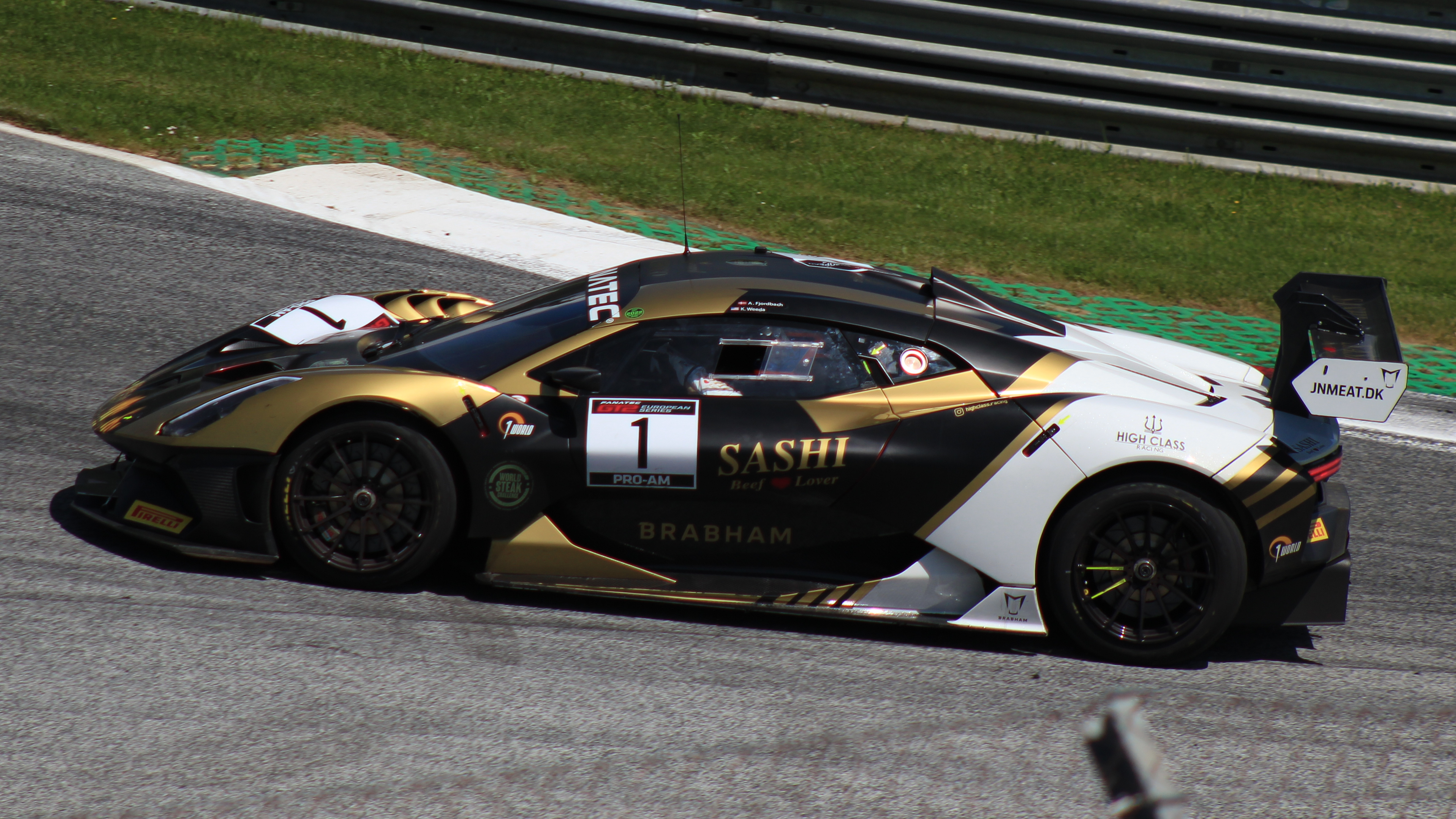
Brabham BT63 GT2

Brabham ceased operations in January 2024, when Brabham ended relations with a supplier. Brabham Automotive ended due to a strategic difference between its owner Fusion Capital and the company.
