= 2021 Britcar Trophy Championship =

The 2021 Britcar Trophy Championship (known for sponsorship reasons as the 2021 Goodyear Britcar Trophy Championship) is a motor racing championship for production cars held across England. The Trophy championship was created specifically for production vehicles as a Britcar championship separate from the much faster GT and Touring Cars of the Endurance Championship. It will be the 20th season of a Britcar championship and the 2nd Britcar Trophy Championship season. The season began on 28 March at Silverstone Circuit and end on 14 November at Brands Hatch.

The championship includes Class 1, 2 and 3 cars, formerly Classes 5, 6 and 7. The Michelin Clio Cup Series also joined the Britcar Trophy Championship grid with the Clio cars having a separate class but still eligible to compete for the overall championship title.

== Calendar ==
Round		Circuit	Length	Date
1	1	Silverstone International, Northamptonshire	50 min	25 April
1	2	Silverstone International, Northamptonshire	50 min	25 April
2	3	Snetterton Circuit (300), Norfolk	50 min	9 May
2	4	Snetterton Circuit (300), Norfolk	50 min	9 May
3	5	Silverstone GP, Northamptonshire	50 min	4 July
3	6	Silverstone GP, Northamptonshire	50 min	4 July
4	7	Brands Hatch Indy Circuit, Kent	50 min	1 August
4	8	Brands Hatch Indy Circuit, Kent	50 min	1 August
5	9	Silverstone International, Northamptonshire	50 min	21 August
5	10	Silverstone International, Northamptonshire	50 min	21 August
6	11	Donington Park GP, Leicestershire	50 min	24 October
6	12	Donington Park GP, Leicestershire	50 min	24 October
NC		Brands Hatch Indy Circuit, Kent (Classes 5–7, Clio only)	50 min	13–14 November
NC		Brands Hatch Indy Circuit, Kent (Classes 5–7, Clio only)	50 min	13–14 November

== Teams and drivers ==
All teams are British-registered.

Team	Car	No.	Drivers	Rounds
Class 1
Maximum Motorsport	Volkswagen Golf	4	(United Kingdom) Simon Tomlinson	TBA
JW Bird Motorsport	Volkswagen Scirocco	5	(United Kingdom) Tony Prendergast	1
JW Bird Motorsport	Volkswagen Scirocco	17	(United Kingdom) Kieran Griffin	1
JW Bird Motorsport	Volkswagen Scirocco	31	(United Kingdom) Paul Dehadray	1
JW Bird Motorsport	Volkswagen Scirocco	77	(United Kingdom) Matthew Evans	1
Kan-Yan Racing	BMW M240i Racing	7	(United Kingdom) David McDonald	1, 3
Kan-Yan Racing	BMW M240i Racing	7	(United Kingdom) Andie Stokoe	1, 3
Woodrow Motorsport	BMW 1M E82	10	(United Kingdom) Simon Baker	1–3
Woodrow Motorsport	BMW 1M E82	10	(United Kingdom) Kevin Clarke	1
Woodrow Motorsport	BMW 1M E82	10	(United Kingdom) Ollie Reubens	2–3
PEGA Racing	BMW M3 E36	12	(United Kingdom) Sholto Dearling	TBA
Charlie Campbell Racing	Peugeot RCZ	20	(United Kingdom) Charlie Campbell	2–3
Charlie Campbell Racing	Peugeot RCZ	20	(United Kingdom) Rob Smith	2–3
MacG Racing	Mazda RX-8	33	(United Kingdom) Jonny MacGregor	1
MacG Racing	Mazda RX-8	33	(United Kingdom) Josh Tomlinson	1
Simon Green Motorsport	BMW M3 E46	40	(United Kingdom) Jasver Sapra	1–3
Simon Green Motorsport	BMW M3 E46	40	(United Kingdom) Lucky Khera	1, 3
Simon Green Motorsport	BMW M3 E46	42	(United Kingdom) Sunny Gill	TBA
Simon Green Motorsport	BMW M3 E46	42	(United Kingdom) Jagjeet Virdee	TBA
Simon Green Motorsport	BMW M3 E36	50	(United Kingdom) Simon Khera	1
TMC Race Engineering	BMW Z3	48	(United Kingdom) Matt Cherrington	TBA
S2Smarts	Smart ForFour	52	(United Kingdom) Rob Baker	1
S2Smarts	Smart ForFour	52	(United Kingdom) Johnathan Barrett	1
Team BRIT	BMW M240i	70	(United Kingdom) Andrew Tucker	1–3
Team BRIT	BMW M240i	70	(United Kingdom) Matty Street	1–2
Team BRIT	BMW M240i	70	(United Kingdom) Paul Voakes	3
SVG Motorsport	Ginetta G56 Academy	74	(United Kingdom) Mark Lee	1–2
SVG Motorsport	Ginetta G56 Academy	74	(United Kingdom) Sam Tomlinson	TBA
SVG Motorsport	Ginetta G55 Academy	TBA	(United Kingdom) Neil Wallace	TBA
WEC Motorsport	BMW M3 E46	75	(United Kingdom) Dave Cox	1–2
WEC Motorsport	BMW M3 E46	75	(United Kingdom) George Haynes	1–2
SBD Motorsport	Ford Fiesta	93	(United Kingdom) Kester Cook	1–2
Datum Motorsport	Ginetta G56 Academy	111	(Brazil) Adriano Medeiros	3
Datum Motorsport	Ginetta G56 Academy		(United Kingdom) Alex Van Nederveen	3
Adam Hatfield Racing	Volkswagen Golf	TBA	TBA	TBA
Geoff Steel Racing	BMW M3 E46	TBA	TBA	TBA
Class 1 Invitation
Toad Motorsport	BMW M3 E46	76	(United Kingdom) Freddie Lynch	3
Toad Motorsport	BMW M3 E46	76	(United Kingdom) Williams Lynch	3
Class 2
Ramen Racing	Ginetta G40	2	(United Kingdom) Andrew Bentley	1–3
Ramen Racing	Ginetta G40	2	(United Kingdom) Peter Spano	1–3
JW Bird Motorsport	Volkswagen Scirocco	5	(United Kingdom) Tony Prendergast	2
JW Bird Motorsport	Volkswagen Scirocco	31	(United Kingdom) Paul Dehadray	2
JW Bird Motorsport	Volkswagen Scirocco	37	(United Kingdom) Daniel Crossley	1
JW Bird Motorsport	Volkswagen Scirocco	37	(United Kingdom) Steve Walker	1
JW Bird Motorsport	Volkswagen Scirocco	77	(United Kingdom) Matthew Evans	2
Quattro Motorsport UK	Ginetta G40	6	(United Kingdom) Bill Forbes	3
Quattro Motorsport UK	BMW M240i	82	(United Kingdom) Richard Evans	2–3
Quattro Motorsport UK	BMW M240i	82	(United Kingdom) Shane Stoney	3
Jemco Racing	Porsche 986 Boxster S	8	(United Kingdom) Kevin Hancock	1–3
Jemco Racing	Porsche 986 Boxster S	8	(United Kingdom) Leigh Smart	1–3
Steve Rothery Racing	Peugeot 308 Racing Cup	14	(United Kingdom) Terry Stephens	3
Steve Rothery Racing	Peugeot 308 Racing Cup	308	(United Kingdom) Steve Rothery	3
County Classic	Porsche 996	15	(United Kingdom) Richard Higgins	1–3
Vinna Sport	Ginetta G40	27	(United Kingdom) Charlotte Birch	1–2
Vinna Sport	Ginetta G40	27	(Brazil) Adriano Medeiros	TBA
Andy Porter	Porsche 986 Boxster S	33	(United Kingdom) Andy Porter	2–3
Saxon Motorsport	SEAT León	34	(United Kingdom) Alistair Lindsay	1–3
Saxon Motorsport	SEAT León	87	(United Kingdom) Brad Kaylor	1
Chandler Motorsport	Volkswagen Golf	35	(United Kingdom) Steven Chandler	1–3
Chandler Motorsport	Volkswagen Golf	35	(United Kingdom) Glenn Stokes	1
Chandler Motorsport	Volkswagen Golf	35	(United Kingdom) Joel Wren	2
Amigo Motorsport	Porsche 986 Boxster S	39	(United Kingdom) Richard Bernard	1–2
Amigo Motorsport	Porsche 986 Boxster S	39	(United Kingdom) Nick Garner	2
Amigo Motorsport	Porsche 986 Boxster S	80	(United Kingdom) Anthony Hutchins	1–2
Reflex Racing	Ginetta G40	47	(United Kingdom) Stuart Gibbons	1–2
Reflex Racing	Ginetta G40	47	(United Kingdom) Derek Holden	1–2
Woodard Racing Organisation	Mini JCW	49	(United Kingdom) Daniel Woodard	1–3
Woodard Racing Organisation	Mini JCW	49	(United Kingdom) Sean Woodard	1–3
Area Motorsport	Honda Civic Type R	51	(United Kingdom) Luke Handley	TBA
Whitebridge Motorsport	BMW Z4	72	(United Kingdom) Roland Hopkins	1, 3
Whitebridge Motorsport	BMW Z4	72	(United Kingdom) Chris Murphy	1, 3
TSR Performance	Volkswagen Golf	77	(United Kingdom) Fynn Jones	3
TSR Performance	Volkswagen Golf	77	(United Kingdom) Tony Rogers	3
Intelligent Money Racing	BMW Z4	85	(United Kingdom) Clinton Ewen	1
Intelligent Money Racing	BMW Z4	85	(United Kingdom) Oliver Smith	1
Full Throttle Motorsport	Porsche 986 Boxster S	97	(United Kingdom) Richard Avery	1
Full Throttle Motorsport	Porsche 986 Boxster S	97	(United Kingdom) Richard Lawrence	1
JamSport	Nissan 370Z	118	(United Kingdom) Dave May	1
JamSport	Nissan 370Z	118	(United Kingdom) Mark Skeets	1
RNR Performance Cars	Ferrari 355	144	(United Kingdom) Chris Compton-Goddard	1, 3
RNR Performance Cars	Ferrari 355	144	(United Kingdom) Richard Dougal	3
RNR Performance Cars	Ferrari 360	TBA	(United Kingdom) Wayne Marrs	TBA
Preptech	Renault Clio Gen 4	177	(United Kingdom) Ryan Firth	1–3
Preptech	Renault Clio Gen 4	177	(United Kingdom) Andy Mollison	1–3
Class 2
Whitebridge Motorsport	BMW Z4	18	(United Kingdom) Callum Bates	3
Whitebridge Motorsport	BMW Z4	108	(United Kingdom) Stefan Murphy	3
Class 3
Aldrich Consulting with Reflex Racing	Ginetta G20	19	(United Kingdom) Steve Griffiths	1–3
Aldrich Consulting with Reflex Racing	Ginetta G20	19	(United Kingdom) Jamie Vynle-Meyers	1–3
Vinna Sport	Ginetta G40	27	(United Kingdom) Charlotte Birch	3
Derek McMahon Racing	Honda Civic Type R	45	(Republic of Ireland) Arthur McMahon	3
Derek McMahon Racing	Honda Civic Type R	83	(United Kingdom) Edward Cook	1–3
Derek McMahon Racing	Honda Civic Type R	83	(United Kingdom) Steve Cook	1–3
Derek McMahon Racing	Alfa Romeo Giulietta	57	(Republic of Ireland) Barry McMahon	1–3
Derek McMahon Racing	Alfa Romeo Giulietta	57	(United Kingdom) Paul Plant	3
TSR Performance	Volkswagen Golf	46	(United Kingdom) Mark Jones	1–3
TSR Performance	Volkswagen Golf	46	(United Kingdom) Robert Taylor	1–3
Team BRIT	BMW 118i	71	(United Kingdom) Luke Pound	1–3
Team BRIT	BMW 118i	71	(United Kingdom) Christian Dart	3
Team BRIT	BMW 118i	71	(United Kingdom) Nerys Pearce	TBA
Paul Sheard Motorsport	Mazda MX5 Mk3	316	(United Kingdom) Ivor Mairs	1–3
Paul Sheard Motorsport	Mazda MX5 Mk3	TBA	(United Kingdom) Stephen Edwards	3
MacG Racing	Mazda RX-7	TBA	(United Kingdom) Kelly Brabbin	TBA
Saxon Motorsport	Honda Civic Type R	TBA	TBA	TBA
Saxon Motorsport	Honda Civic Type R	TBA	TBA	TBA
Class 3 Invitation
Paul Sheard Motorsport	Mazda MX5 Mk3	316	(United Kingdom) Ivor Mairs	1
Clio
Spires Motorsport	Renault Clio Cup Gen 4	4	(United Kingdom) Darren Geeraerts	1–3
Spires Motorsport	Renault Clio Cup Gen 4	4	(United Kingdom) Anton Spires	1–3
Motus One with Praga	Renault Clio Cup Gen 4	11	(United Kingdom) Miles Lacey	1
Motus One with Praga	Renault Clio Cup Gen 4	11	(United Kingdom) Jay Morton	1
Motus One with Praga	Renault Clio Cup Gen 4	11	(United Kingdom) Matt Cherrington	3
Motus One with Praga	Renault Clio Cup Gen 4	11	(United Kingdom) Steve O'Brien	3
Vortex Racing	Renault Clio Cup RS	41	(United Kingdom) Aaron Thompson	1, 3
Vortex Racing	Renault Clio Cup RS	41	(United Kingdom) Steve Thompson	1, 3
Westbourne Motors	Renault Clio Cup Gen 4	41	(United Kingdom) Aaron Thompson	2
Westbourne Motors	Renault Clio Cup Gen 4	41	(United Kingdom) Steve Thompson	2
Westbourne Motors	Renault Clio Cup Gen 4	62	(United Kingdom) James Colburn	1–2
Westbourne Motors	Renault Clio Cup Gen 4	62	(United Kingdom) Ben Colburn	1
Westbourne Motors	Renault Clio Cup Gen 4	62	(United Kingdom) Sarah Franklin	2–3
Westbourne Motors	Renault Clio Cup Gen 3	67	(United Kingdom) James Black	1–3
Westbourne Motors	Renault Clio Cup Gen 3	67	(United Kingdom) Richard Colburn	1–2

== Race results ==
**Bold** indicates overall winner.

Round		Circuit	Pole position	Fastest lap	Winning C1	Winning C2	Winning C3	Winning Clio
1	R1	Silverstone International	No. 10 Woodrow Motorsport	No. 10 Woodrow Motorsport	**No. 10 Woodrow Motorsport**	No. 15 County Classics	No. 19 Aldrich Consulting with Reflex Racing	No. 62 Westbourne Motors
1	R1	Silverstone International	(United Kingdom) Simon Baker (United Kingdom) Kevin Clarke	(United Kingdom) Simon Baker (United Kingdom) Kevin Clarke	**(United Kingdom) Simon Baker** **(United Kingdom) Kevin Clarke**	(United Kingdom) Richard Higgins	(United Kingdom) Steve Griffiths (United Kingdom) Jamie Vynle-Meyers	(United Kingdom) Ben Colburn (United Kingdom) James Colburn
1	R2	Silverstone International		No. 10 Woodrow Motorsport	**No. 10 Woodrow Motorsport**	No. 15 County Classics	No. 19 Aldrich Consulting with Reflex Racing	No. 62 Westbourne Motors
1	R2	Silverstone International		(United Kingdom) Simon Baker (United Kingdom) Kevin Clarke	**(United Kingdom) Simon Baker** **(United Kingdom) Kevin Clarke**	(United Kingdom) Richard Higgins	(United Kingdom) Steve Griffiths (United Kingdom) Jamie Vynle-Meyers	(United Kingdom) Ben Colburn (United Kingdom) James Colburn
2	R3	Snetterton 300	No. 10 Woodrow Motorsport	No. 10 Woodrow Motorsport	**No. 10 Woodrow Motorsport**	No. 82 Quattro Motorsport	No. 19 Aldrich Consulting with Reflex Racing	No. 41 Westbourne Motors
2	R3	Snetterton 300	(United Kingdom) Simon Baker (United Kingdom) Ollie Reubens	(United Kingdom) Simon Baker (United Kingdom) Ollie Reubens	**(United Kingdom) Simon Baker** **(United Kingdom) Ollie Reubens**	(United Kingdom) Richard Evans	(United Kingdom) Steve Griffiths (United Kingdom) Jamie Vynle-Meyers	(United Kingdom) Aaron Thompson (United Kingdom) Steve Thompson
2	R4	Snetterton 300	No. 10 Woodrow Motorsport	No. 10 Woodrow Motorsport	**No. 10 Woodrow Motorsport**	No. 82 Quattro Motorsport	No. 19 Aldrich Consulting with Reflex Racing	No. 41 Westbourne Motors
2	R4	Snetterton 300	(United Kingdom) Simon Baker (United Kingdom) Ollie Reubens	(United Kingdom) Simon Baker (United Kingdom) Ollie Reubens	**(United Kingdom) Simon Baker** **(United Kingdom) Ollie Reubens**	(United Kingdom) Richard Evans	(United Kingdom) Steve Griffiths (United Kingdom) Jamie Vynle-Meyers	(United Kingdom) Aaron Thompson (United Kingdom) Steve Thompson
3	R5	Silverstone GP	No. 111 Datum Motorsport	No. 10 Woodrow Motorsport	**No. 111 Datum Motorsport**	No. 308 Steve Rothery Racing	No. 45 Derek McMahon Racing	No. 41 Westbourne Motors
3	R5	Silverstone GP	(Brazil) Adriano Medeiros (United Kingdom) Alex Van Nederveen	(United Kingdom) Simon Baker (United Kingdom) Ollie Reubens	**(Brazil) Adriano Medeiros** **(United Kingdom) Alex Van Nederveen**	(United Kingdom) Steve Rothery	(Republic of Ireland) Arthur McMahon	(United Kingdom) Aaron Thompson (United Kingdom) Steve Thompson
3	R6	Silverstone GP	No. 7 Kan-Yan Racing	No. 111 Datum Motorsport	**No. 111 Datum Motorsport**	No. 15 County Classics	No. 46 TSR Performance	No. 4 Westbourne Motors
3	R6	Silverstone GP	(United Kingdom) David McDonald (United Kingdom) Andie Stokes	(Brazil) Adriano Medeiros (United Kingdom) Alex Van Nederveen	**(Brazil) Adriano Medeiros** **(United Kingdom) Alex Van Nederveen**	(United Kingdom) Richard Higgins	(United Kingdom) Mark Jones (United Kingdom) Robert Taylor	(United Kingdom) Darren Geeraerts (United Kingdom) Anton Spires
5	R7	Brands Hatch Indy						
5	R8	Brands Hatch Indy						
5	R9	Silverstone International						
5	R10	Silverstone International						
6	R11	Donington Park GP						
6	R12	Donington Park GP						
NC		Brands Hatch Indy						

=== Overall championship standings ===
Points are awarded as follows in all classes:

System	1st	2nd	3rd	4th	5th	6th	7th	8th	9th	10th	11th	12th	13th	14th	15th	PP	FL
+2	30	27	25	20	19	18	17	16	15	14	13	12	11	10	9	1	1

System	1st	2nd	PP	FL
-2	20	17	1	1

Pos.	Drivers	No.	Class	SIL1		SNE		SIL2	BRH1	SIL3	DON	BRH2	Pts
1	(United Kingdom) Steve Griffiths (United Kingdom) Jamie Vynle-Meyers	19	3	16	18	17	18						125
=	(United Kingdom) Simon Baker	10	1	**1**	1	**1**	1						125
=	(United Kingdom) Kevin Clarke	10	1	**1**	1								125
=	(United Kingdom) Ollie Reubens	10	1			**1**	1						125
3	(United Kingdom) James Colburn	62	Clio	10	9	15	14						117
3	(United Kingdom) Ben Colburn	62	Clio	10	9								117
3	(United Kingdom) Sarah Franklin	62	Clio			15	14						117
4	(United Kingdom) Andrew Bentley (United Kingdom) Peter Spano	2	2	9	7	5	7						112
=	(United Kingdom) Richard Higgins	15	2	7	6	7	6						112
6	(United Kingdom) Edward Cook (United Kingdom) Steve Cook	83	3	24	24	19	19						106
=	(United Kingdom) Mark Lee	74	1	2	3	2	2						106
8	(United Kingdom) Aaron Thompson (United Kingdom) Steve Thompson	41	Clio	14	33	13	12						105
9	(United Kingdom) James Black (United Kingdom) Richard Colburn	67	Clio	18	17	16	17						90
10	(United Kingdom) Kester Cook	93	1	6	4	3	3						88
11	(Republic of Ireland) Barry McMahon	57	3	28	29	22	20						83
12	(United Kingdom) Luke Pound	71	3	27	27								79
=	(United Kingdom) Ryan Firth (United Kingdom) Andy Mollison	177	2	12	12	18	10						79
14	(United Kingdom) Jasver Sapra	40	1	3	2	4	DNS						72
14	(United Kingdom) Lucky Khera	40	1	3	2								72
=	(United Kingdom) Darren Geeraerts (United Kingdom) Anton Spires	4	Clio	31	11	Ret	16						72
16	(United Kingdom) Matty Street (United Kingdom) Andrew Tucker	70	1	8	32	10	13						70
=	(United Kingdom) Steven Chandler	35	2	19	18	8	8						70
=	(United Kingdom) Glenn Stokes	35	2	19	18								70
=	(United Kingdom) Joel Wren	35	2			8	8						70
18	(United Kingdom) Daniel Woodard (United Kingdom) Sean Woodard	49	2	15	19	27	15						63
19	(United Kingdom) Richard Evans	82	2			4	5						60
20	(United Kingdom) Mark Jones (United Kingdom) Robert Taylor	46	3	26	23	Ret	Ret						52
21	(United Kingdom) Kevin Hancock (United Kingdom) Leigh Smart	8	2	30	34	20	23						51
=	(United Kingdom) Stuart Gibbons (United Kingdom) Derek Holden	47	2	29	31	23	24						51
23	(United Kingdom) Daniel Crossley (United Kingdom) Steve Walker	37	2	13	10								45
24	(United Kingdom) Ivor Mairs	316	3	DSQ		21	22						44
25	(United Kingdom) Charlotte Birch	27	2	20	16	29	DNS						43
26	(United Kingdom) Richard Bernard	39	2	32	21	25	Ret						39
=	(United Kingdom) David McDonald (United Kingdom) Andie Stokes	7	1	4	5								39
=	(United Kingdom) Miles Lacey (United Kingdom) Jay Morton	11	Clio	21	20								39
=	(United Kingdom) Charlie Campbell (United Kingdom) Rob Smith	20	1			12	4						38
30	(United Kingdom) Tony Prendergast	5	1	5	8								37
=	(United Kingdom) Chris Compton-Goddard	144	2	17	15								37
=	(United Kingdom) Andy Porter	33	2			11	9						37
33	(United Kingdom) Roland Hopkins (United Kingdom) Chris Murphy	72	2	23	22								29
=	(United Kingdom) Matty Evans	77	2			26	11						29
35	(United Kingdom) Alistair Lindsay	34	2	22	28								27
=	(United Kingdom) Clinton Ewen (United Kingdom) Oliver Smith	85	2	25	25								27
37	(United Kingdom) Paul Dehadray	31	2			9	Ret						19
38	(United Kingdom) Anthony Hutchins	80	2	DNS	DNS	14	Ret						17
=	(United Kingdom) Kieran Griffin	17	1	DNS	13								17
40	(United Kingdom) Paul Dehadray	31	1	Ret	14								16
=	(United Kingdom) Dave Cox (United Kingdom) George Haynes	75	1	11	DNS								16
42	(United Kingdom) Rob Baker (United Kingdom) Johnathan Barrett	52	1	33	Ret								15
43	(United Kingdom) Tony Prendergast	5	2			28	Ret						37
–	(United Kingdom) Matty Evans	77	1	Ret	DNS								0
–	(United Kingdom) Simon Khera	50	1	Ret	DNS								0
–	(United Kingdom) Brad Kaylor	87	2	Ret	DNS								0
drivers ineligible for points
–	(United Kingdom) Ivor Mairs	316	3Inv		30								0
Pos.	Drivers	No.	Class	SIL1		SNE		SIL2	BRH1	SIL3	DON	BRH2	Pts

Key
Colour	Result
Gold	Winner
Silver	Second place
Bronze	Third place
Green	Other points position
Blue	Other classified position
Blue	Not classified, finished (NC)
Purple	Not classified, retired (Ret)
Red	Did not qualify (DNQ)
Red	Did not pre-qualify (DNPQ)
Black	Disqualified (DSQ)
White	Did not start (DNS)
White	Race cancelled (C)
Blank	Did not practice (DNP)
Blank	Excluded (EX)
Blank	Did not arrive (DNA)
Blank	Withdrawn (WD)
Blank	Did not enter (cell empty)
Text formatting	Meaning
**Bold**	Pole position
Italics	Fastest lap

† – Drivers did not finish the race, but were classified as they completed over 60% of the race distance and were awarded half points.

=== Class championship standings ===
Points are awarded as follows in all classes:

System	1st	2nd	3rd	4th	5th	6th	7th	8th	9th	10th	11th	12th	13th	14th	15th	PP	FL
+2	30	27	25	20	19	18	17	16	15	14	13	12	11	10	9	1	1

System	1st	2nd	PP	FL
-2	20	17	1	1

Pos.	Drivers	No.	SIL1		SNE		SIL2	BRH1	SIL3	DON	BRH2	Pts
Class 1
1	(United Kingdom) Simon Baker	10	**1**	1	**1**	1						125
1	(United Kingdom) Kevin Clarke	10	**1**	1								125
1	(United Kingdom) Ollie Reubens	10			**1**	1						125
2	(United Kingdom) Mark Lee	74	2	3	2	2						106
3	(United Kingdom) Kester Cook	93	6	4	3	3						88
4	(United Kingdom) Jasver Sapra	40	3	2	4	DNS						72
4	(United Kingdom) Lucky Khera	40	3	2								72
5	(United Kingdom) Matty Street (United Kingdom) Andrew Tucker	70	8	32	10	13						70
6	(United Kingdom) David McDonald (United Kingdom) Andie Stokes	7	4	5								39
7	(United Kingdom) Charlie Campbell (United Kingdom) Rob Smith	20			12	4						38
8	(United Kingdom) Tony Prendergast	5	5	8								37
9	(United Kingdom) Kieran Griffin	17	DNS	13								17
10	(United Kingdom) Paul Dehadray	31	Ret	14								16
=	(United Kingdom) Dave Cox (United Kingdom) George Haynes	75	11	DNS								16
12	(United Kingdom) Rob Baker (United Kingdom) Johnathan Barrett	52	33	Ret								15
–	(United Kingdom) Matty Evans	77	Ret	DNS								0
–	(United Kingdom) Simon Khera	50	Ret	DNS								0
Class 2
1	(United Kingdom) Richard Higgins	15	7	6								60
2	(United Kingdom) Andrew Bentley (United Kingdom) Peter Spano	2	**9**	7								57
3	(United Kingdom) Ryan Firth (United Kingdom) Andy Mollison	177	12	12								45
=	(United Kingdom) Daniel Crossley (United Kingdom) Steve Walker	37	13	10								45
5	(United Kingdom) Chris Compton-Goddard	144	17	15								37
6	(United Kingdom) Daniel Woodard (United Kingdom) Sean Woodard	49	15	19								36
7	(United Kingdom) Charlotte Birch	27	20	16								34
8	(United Kingdom) Steven Chandler (United Kingdom) Glenn Stokes	35	19	18								30
9	(United Kingdom) Roland Hopkins (United Kingdom) Chris Murphy	72	23	22								29
10	(United Kingdom) Alistair Lindsay	34	22	28								27
=	(United Kingdom) Clinton Ewen (United Kingdom) Oliver Smith	85	25	25								27
12	(United Kingdom) Richard Bernard	39	32	21								26
13	(United Kingdom) Stuart Gibbons (United Kingdom) Derek Holden	85	29	31								23
14	(United Kingdom) Kevin Hancock (United Kingdom) Leigh Smart	8	30	34								21
–	(United Kingdom) Brad Kaylor	87	Ret	DNS								0
–	(United Kingdom) Anthony Hutchins	80	DNS	DNS								0
Class 3
1	(United Kingdom) Steve Griffiths (United Kingdom) Jamie Vynle-Meyers	19	**16**	18								63
2	(United Kingdom) Edward Cook (United Kingdom) Steve Cook	83	24	24								52
=	(United Kingdom) Mark Jones (United Kingdom) Robert Taylor	46	26	23								52
4	(United Kingdom) Luke Pound	71	27	27								40
5	(Republic of Ireland) Barry McMahon	57	28	29								38
–	(United Kingdom) Ivor Mairs	316	DSQ									0
drivers ineligible for points
–	(United Kingdom) Ivor Mairs	316		30								0
Clio
1	(United Kingdom) Ben Colburn (United Kingdom) James Colburn	62	10	9								61
2	(United Kingdom) Darren Geeraerts (United Kingdom) Anton Spires	4	**31**	11								47
3	(United Kingdom) James Black (United Kingdom) Richard Colburn	67	18	17								45
4	(United Kingdom) Aaron Thompson (United Kingdom) Steve Thompson	41	14	33								44
5	(United Kingdom) Miles Lacey (United Kingdom) Jay Morton	11	21	20								39
Pos.	Drivers	No.	SIL1		SNE		SIL2	BRH1	SIL3	DON	BRH2	Pts

Key
Colour	Result
Gold	Winner
Silver	Second place
Bronze	Third place
Green	Other points position
Blue	Other classified position
Blue	Not classified, finished (NC)
Purple	Not classified, retired (Ret)
Red	Did not qualify (DNQ)
Red	Did not pre-qualify (DNPQ)
Black	Disqualified (DSQ)
White	Did not start (DNS)
White	Race cancelled (C)
Blank	Did not practice (DNP)
Blank	Excluded (EX)
Blank	Did not arrive (DNA)
Blank	Withdrawn (WD)
Blank	Did not enter (cell empty)
Text formatting	Meaning
**Bold**	Pole position
Italics	Fastest lap

† – Drivers did not finish the race, but were classified as they completed over 60% of the race distance and were awarded half points.
