= Ginetta G40 Junior =

Ginetta G40 Junior may refer to:

- Ginetta G40, a racing car.
- Ginetta Junior Championship, an auto racing series for the Ginetta G40
