= Britcar =

Endurance motor racing series in the United Kingdom

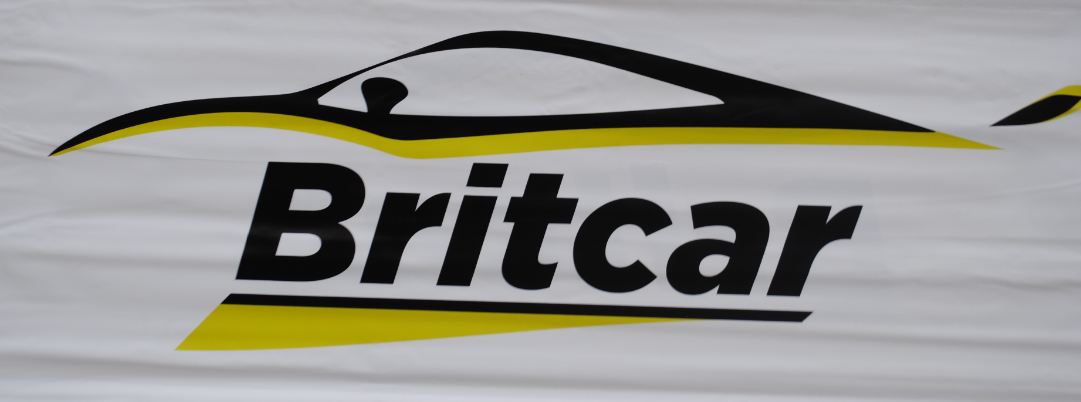
- Category: Endurance
- Country: United Kingdom
- Inaugural season: 2005
- Drivers: Varies
- Teams: Varies
- Tyre suppliers: Goodyear
- Drivers' champion: Challenge: (United Kingdom) Dominic Malone (United Kingdom) Adam Smalley (United Kingdom) Dan Cammish (United Kingdom) Charles Rainford; GT: (United Kingdom) Chris Bingham (United Kingdom) Michael Lyons; Ginetta: (Italy) Marco Anastasi (Italy) Maurizio Sciglio; Trophy: (United Kingdom) Chris Murphy; Cup: (United Kingdom) Asha Silva (United Kingdom) Bobby Trundley; TCR: (United Kingdom) Rob Ellick (United Kingdom) Fynn Jones

Britcar is an endurance sports car racing and touring car racing series in the United Kingdom.

It was formed in 1997, as a result of a discussion in a Nürburgring bar between Willie Moore and James Tucker. Folklore has it that James Tucker and John Veness formed the organizing European Endurance & Racing Club (EERC) with a £10 note found on the ground. The foremost aim was the re-introduction of a 24-hour race in Britain.

At the end of the 2015 season, James sold the Britcar rights to Hedley Cowell Events Ltd. For the 2016 season, Claire Hedley re-launched Britcar Endurance as the Dunlop Endurance Championship and Dunlop Trophy Championship. For 2020 the series was invited to support the FIA World Endurance Championship races at Spa-Francorchamps and Silverstone. The race format was 2 × 60 mins Endurance races and 2 × 50 mins Trophy races.

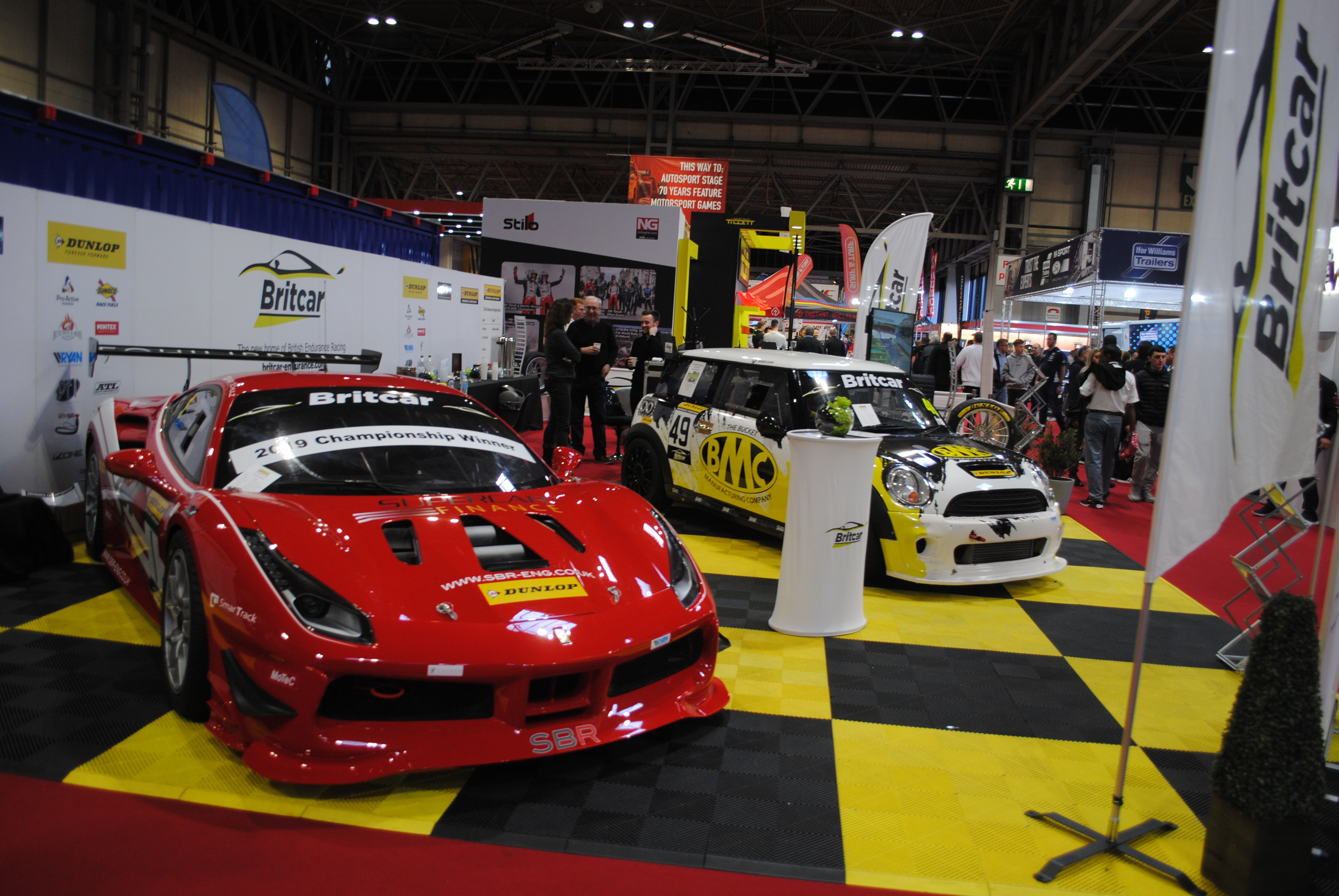
Britcar's Stand at the 2020 Autosport International show.

== Cars and results ==
There are two separate championships for different types of car; although some cars can run in both, they may be in different categories.

GTs, which include cars like Ferraris, Porsche Cup, Marcos, Moslers and Ginettas over a long-distance race, normally between two and four hours in length with a compulsory pit stop. Normally cars will have two or three drivers, but cars are sometimes driven by one driver, are given a longer time in the pits.

Production, which include cars like Renault Clio Cup, Seat León Supercopa, VW Golf, Porsche Boxster, BMW M3s, Lotus Elise and Mini Cooper S. These races are normally 90 minutes long, featuring a mandatory pit stop. There can be up to two drivers per car.

Drivers normally bring their own cars to Britcar events, where most cars are accepted if safe to race. Cars are assigned to different classes depending on the car, the car's equipment and other fittings the vehicle has.

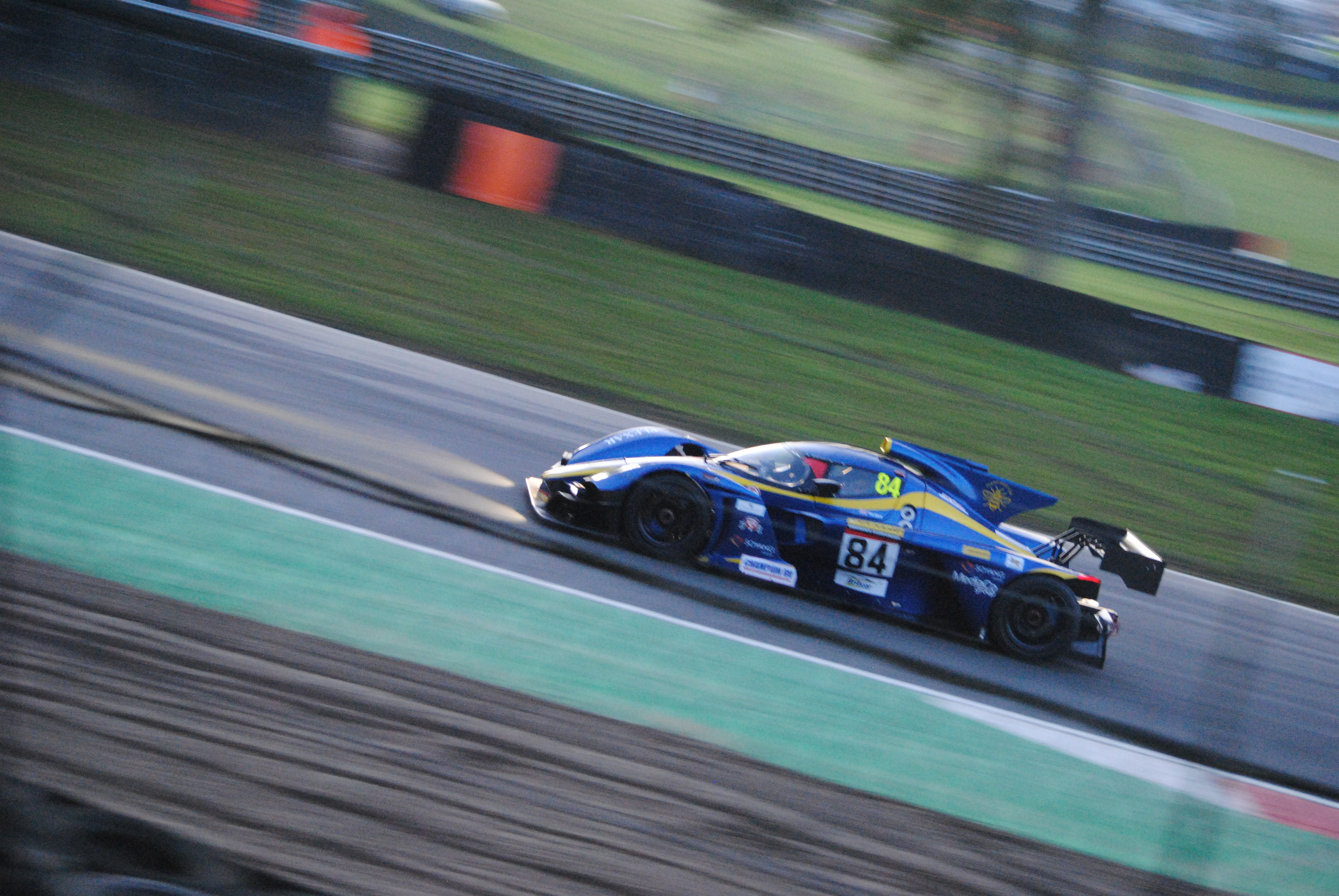
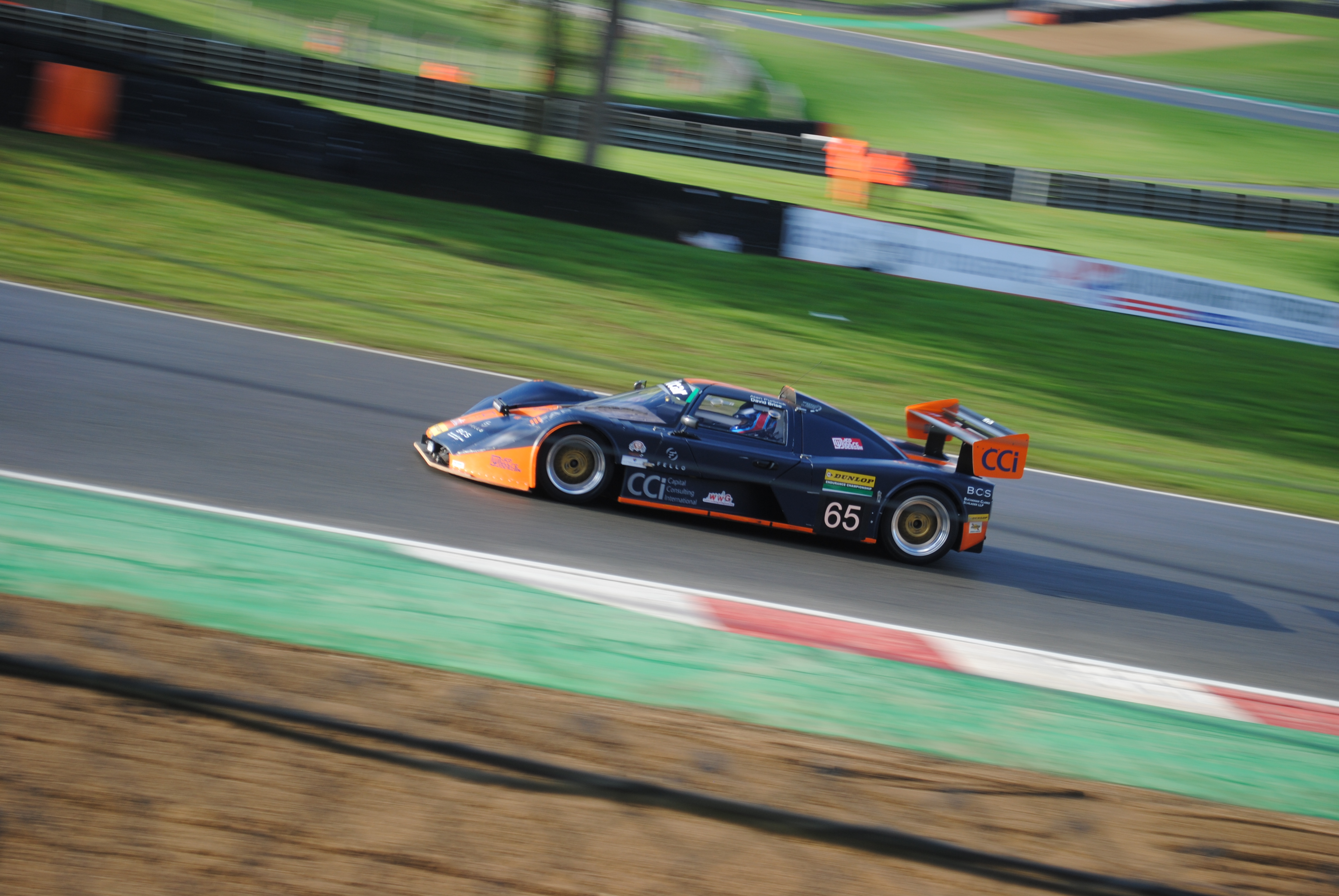
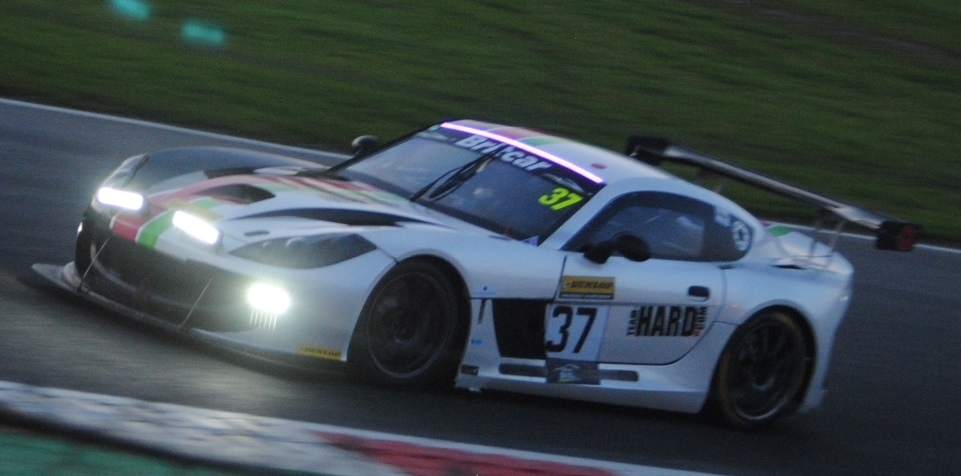
The Praga R1T (left), a Class 1 car. A Saker RAPX (middle), a Class 2 car. A Ginetta G55 Supercup (right), a Class 3 car.
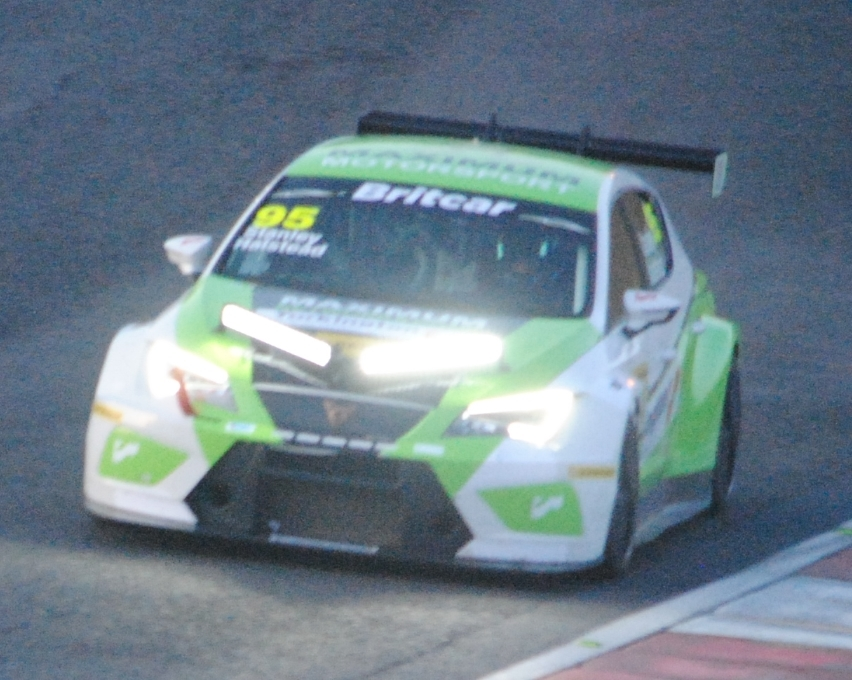
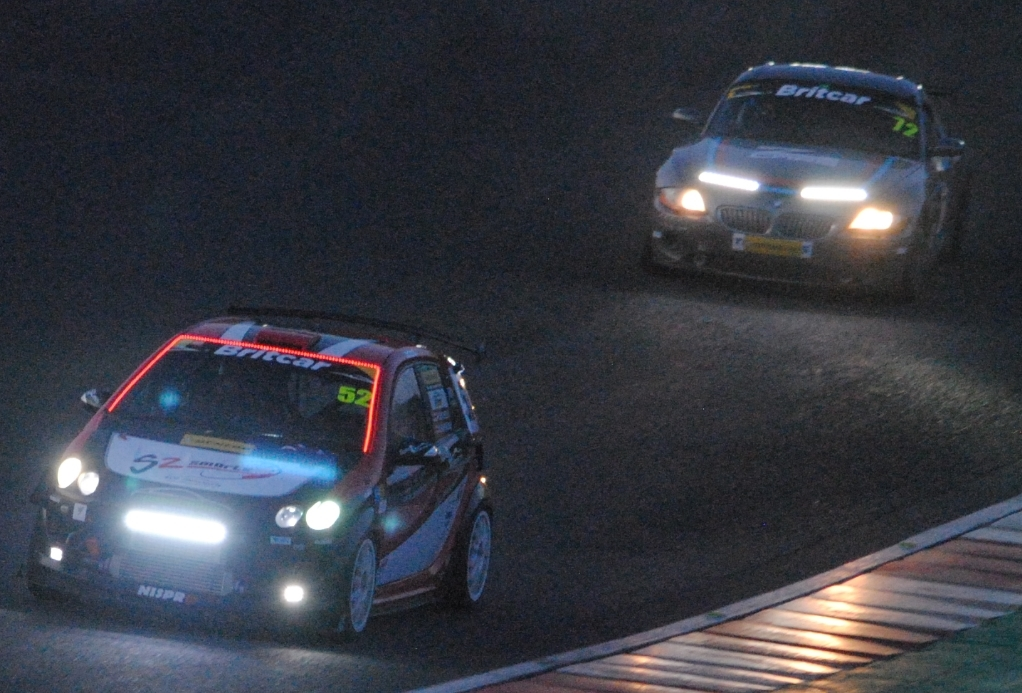
A CUPRA León TCR (left), a Class 4 car. A Smart Forfour and BMW Z4, two Class 5 cars (right).

=== Cars & classes ===
Cars that competed in the Britcar Endurance Championship from 2016 onwards:

Class	Make	Model	Type	Years
1	(Italy) Ferrari	488 Challenge	Cup	2018
1	(Italy) Ferrari	458	GTE	2017
1	(United Kingdom) Aston Martin	Vulcan AMR Pro	GTE	2020–2021
1	(Poland) Arrinera	Hussarya	GT3	2017
1	(United Kingdom) Aston Martin	V12 Vantage	GT3	2017, 2020
1	(Germany) Audi	R8 LMS Ultra	GT3	2016
1	(Germany) BMW	Z4	GT3	2016, 2019
1	(Australia) Brabham	BT62	GT3	2019
1	(Italy) Ferrari	458	GT3	2016–2018
1	(Italy) Ferrari	488	GT3	2018
1	(Italy) Lamborghini	Gallardo	GT3	2016
1	(Italy) Lamborghini	Huracán	GT3	2016, 2019, 2021
1	(Italy) Lamborghini	Huracán Evo	GT3	2021
1	(United Kingdom) MacG	Taranis	GT3	2016–2021
1	(United Kingdom) McLaren	MP4-12C	GT3	2016
1	(United Kingdom) McLaren	650S	GT3	2019, 2021
1	(Germany) Mercedes-AMG	AMG	GT3	2017–2019
1	(United States) Mosler	MT900	GT3	2016–2018
1	(Japan) Nissan	GT-R Nismo	GT3	2021
1	(United Kingdom) Radical	RXC	GT3	2017, 2020
1	(France) Renault	R.S. 01	GT3	2016
1	(Netherlands) Saker	RAPX	SP	2018–2019
1	(Czech Republic) Praga	R1T	Superlights	2019
1	(Czech Republic) Praga	R1S	Superlights	2019
1	(Czech Republic) Praga	R1T Evo	Superlights	2020
2	(Italy) Ferrari	360 Challenge	Cup	2017
2	(Italy) Ferrari	458 Challenge	Cup	2016–2018
2	(Italy) Ferrari	488 Challenge	Cup	2018–2021
2	(United Kingdom) Ginetta	G55 Supercup	Cup	2019
2	(Germany) Porsche	997 GT3	Cup	2016–2018
2	(Germany) Porsche	991 GT3	Cup	2017–2018
2	(Germany) Porsche	911 RSR	GT2	2016, 2018
2	(United Kingdom) McLaren	570S	GT4	2019
2	(Sweden) Volvo	S60	Silhouette	2018
2	(Netherlands) Saker	RAPX	SP	2017–2019
2	(Czech Republic) Praga	R1S	Supercar	2020
2	(Germany) BMW	1M E82	Touring	2016–2021
3	(Italy) Ferrari	360 Challenge	Cup	2017
3	(Italy) Ferrari	458 Challenge	Cup	2020–2021
3	(United Kingdom) Ginetta	G55 Supercup	Cup	2019
3	(Germany) Porsche	997	Cup	2019–2020
3	(Germany) Porsche	991 GT3	Cup	2019–2020
3	(Germany) Porsche	997 GT3	Cup	2019
3	(Germany) Porsche	911 RSR	GT2	2020
3	(United Kingdom) Aston Martin	V8 Vantage	GT4	2016–2018
3	(Germany) BMW	M3 E92	GT4	2017
3	(Germany) BMW	M4 GT4	GT4	2018
3	(United Kingdom) Chevron	GR8	GT4	2016
3	(United Kingdom) Ginetta	G55	GT4	2016–2018, 2020
3	(Austria) KTM	X-Bow	GT4	2017–2018
3	(United Kingdom) Lotus	Europa S	GT4	2016
3	(United Kingdom) McLaren	570S	GT4	2018
3	(Germany) Porsche	Cayman Clubsport	GT4	2017–2018
3	(Germany) BMW	1M E82	Touring	2021
3	(Germany) BMW	M3 E46 GTR	Touring	2016–2017, 2019–2021
4	(United Kingdom) Ginetta	G50	Cup	2016–2019
4	(United Kingdom) Ginetta	G55 Supercup	Cup	2021
4	(Germany) Porsche	997 GT3	Cup	2019
4	(United Kingdom) Aston Martin	V8 Vantage	GT4	2019–2021
4	(United Kingdom) Aston Martin	Vantage AMR	GT4	2021
4	(Germany) BMW	M3 E92	GT4	2017–2018
4	(United Kingdom) Ginetta	G50	GT4	2016–2019
4	(United Kingdom) Ginetta	G55	GT4	2020
4	(United Kingdom) Jaguar	Jaguar F-Type S	GT4	2020–2021
4	(France) Ligier	JS2 R	GT4	2020–2021
4	(Italy) Maserati	Granturismo MC	GT4	2021
4	(United Kingdom) McLaren	570S	GT4	2021
4	(Germany) Mercedes-AMG	AMG	GT4	2018–2019
4	(Germany) Porsche	718 Cayman Clubsport	GT4	2019–2021
4	(Germany) Porsche	Cayman Clubsport MR	GT4	2020–2021
4	(Germany) Audi	A4	NGTC	2018
4	(Japan) Toyota	Avensis	NGTC	2017–2018
4	(Italy) Alfa Romeo	156 T	Production	2019
4	(Australia) Holden	Monaro	Production	2017
4	(Japan) Honda	Civic Type R (FK8)	Production	2018
4	(Germany) Audi	RS3 LMS	TCR	2017–2018, 2020–2021
4	(Spain) Cupra	León	TCR	2017–2021
4	(South Korea) Hyundai	i30 N	TCR	2021
4	(United Kingdom) Vauxhall	Astra	TCR	2018
4	(France) Peugeot	308 Racing Cup	TCR	2019
4	(Spain) SEAT	León	TCR	2017–2021
4	(Germany) Volkswagen	Golf GTI	TCR	2018–2021
4	(Germany) BMW	1M E82	Touring car	2019–2020
4	(Germany) BMW	M3 E36	Touring car	2016–2020
4	(Germany) BMW	M3 E46	Touring car	2016–2020
4	(Germany) BMW	M3 E46 GTR	Touring car	2016–2017, 2019–2020
4	(Germany) BMW	BMW M3 E90	Touring car	2020
5	(United Kingdom) Mini	JCW Challenge R56	Cup	2016–2017, 2019
5	(United Kingdom) Ginetta	G40	Cup	2016–2017
5	(Germany) Porsche	Boxster	Cup	2016
5	(Germany) Volkswagen	Golf Mk5	Cup	2017–2018
5	(Germany) Volkswagen	Scirocco	Cup	2018
5	(Germany) Volkswagen	CC	NGTC	2017
5	(Italy) Alfa Romeo	156 T	Production	2017, 2019
5	(Germany) BMW	Z4	Production	2019
5	(United States) Ford	Focus	Production	2017–2018
5	(Japan) Honda	Civic Type R (FK2)	Production	2016–2017
5	(Japan) Honda	Civic Type R (FK8)	Production	2018
5	(Japan) Honda	Civic Type R (EP3)	Production	2019
5	(Japan) Honda	Civic (FK/FN)	Production	2019
5	(United Kingdom) Smart	Forfour	Production	2017–2019

Cars that competed in the British Endurance Championship from 2022 onwards:

Class	Make	Model	Years
A	(United Kingdom) Aston Martin	Vulcan AMR Pro	2022–2023
A	(Germany) Audi	R8 LMS Evo II	2023–2024
A	(United Kingdom) Bentley	Continental GT3 (2018)	2024
A	(Germany) BMW	Z4 GT3	2022
A	(Italy) Lamborghini	Huracán GT3 Evo	2022
A	(Italy) Lamborghini	Huracán GT3 Evo 2	2024
A	(United Kingdom) MacG	Taranis	2022
A	(United Kingdom) McLaren	650S GT3	2022
A	(United Kingdom) McLaren	720S GT3	2022
A	(Germany) Mercedes-AMG	GT3	2022
A	(Germany) Mercedes-AMG	GT3 Evo	2022–2023
B	(United States) Dodge	Viper Competition Coupe GT3	2022
B	(Italy) Ferrari	488 Challenge	2022, 2024
B	(Italy) Ferrari	488 Challenge Evo	2022–2023
B	(Italy) Lamborghini	Huracán Super Trofeo Evo	2022–2023
B	(Italy) Lamborghini	Huracán Super Trofeo EVO2	2022
B	(Germany) Porsche	Porsche 992 GT3 Cup	2024
B	(France) Solution F	TC 12	2023
C	(Germany) Audi	S3 Saloon	2023
C	(Germany) BMW	1M E82	2022
C	(Italy) Ferrari	458 Challenge	2022–2023
C	(United Kingdom) Ginetta	G55 Supercup	2022
C	(Japan) Honda	Civic Type R (FK8)	2023
C	(Germany) Porsche	Porsche 991 GT3 Cup I	2023
C	(Germany) Porsche	991 GT3 Cup II	2022
C	(Germany) Porsche	997 Cup	2022–2023
C	(Germany) Porsche	718 Cayman GT4 RS Clubsport	2022
C	(Germany) Volkswagen	CC	2023
GT4	(United Kingdom) Aston Martin	Vantage GT4	2022
GT4	(United Kingdom) Aston Martin	Vantage AMR GT4	2022–2023
GT4	(Germany) BMW	M3 GT4	2023
GT4	(Germany) BMW	BMW M4 GT4	2024
GT4	(United Kingdom) Ginetta	G55 GT4	2022
GT4	(Austria) KTM	X-Bow GT4	2023–2024
GT4	(United Kingdom) McLaren	570S GT4	2022–2024
GT4	(Germany) Mercedes-AMG	GT4	2022–2024
GT4	(Germany) Porsche	718 Cayman GT4 Clubsport	2022
GT4	(Germany) Porsche	718 Cayman GT4 RS Clubsport	2022, 2024
TCR	(Germany) Audi	RS 3 LMS TCR (2021)	2022–2024
TCR	(Spain) Cupra	León TCR	2022–2024
TCR	(Spain) Cupra	León Competición TCR	2022–2024
TCR	(Germany) Mercedes-AMG	A-Class (NGTC)	2024
TCR	(United Kingdom) Vauxhall	Astra TCR	2022–2023
TCR	(Spain) SEAT	León	2024
TCR	(Germany) Volkswagen	Golf GTI TCR	2022–2023
F	(Germany) BMW	M3 GTR	2022, 2024
F	(United Kingdom) Jaguar	F-Type S	2022–2024
F	(Germany) Porsche	997	2022

== Focus on diversity ==
The series is known for its diversity in teams, cars and drivers that had regained the attention it lost before its reformation, Britcar were invited to support two WEC rounds, at Spa-Francorchamps and Silverstone (subsequently cancelled). Britcar stated "we are immensely proud that our endeavours to produce a professionally-run nationally based Championship have been recognised by organisers of one of the biggest Championships in global motorsport."

Reflecting diversity in both the Endurance and Trophy series, among the teams are Team BRIT whose drivers are all disabled, using specially developed hand controls.

== Winners ==
Overall winner in each category, 2002 - 2022.

Year	Series	Team	Car	Drivers
2002	Britcar Series		BMW M3 E30	(United Kingdom) Paul Bates
2003	Britcar Series	RouseSport	Mercedes 190 DTM	(United Kingdom) Andy Rouse (United Kingdom) Julian Rouse
2004	Britcar Series	GTS Motorsport	BMW M3	(United Kingdom) John Hammersley (United Kingdom) Andrew Dunlop (United Kingdom) Mark Hammersley
2005	Britcar Series	GTS Motorsport	BMW M3 E36	(United Kingdom) Harry Handkammer (United Kingdom) David Leslie
2006	Britcar Series	Hargreaves Motorsport	Ferrari 360	(United Kingdom) Calum Lockie (United Kingdom) Bo McCormick
2007	Britcar GT	Geoff Steel Racing	BMW M3 E36	(United Kingdom) Steve Bell (United Kingdom) Simon Leith
2007	Production S1	Moore Racing	BMW M3 E36	(United Kingdom) Mike Gardiner (United Kingdom) Paul Fenton
2007	Britsports	Lovett Sporting	Norma M20	(United Kingdom) Edward Lovett (United Kingdom) Chris Harris
2008	Britcar GT	Neil Garner Racing	Porsche 997	(Sweden) Jan Persson (United Kingdom) Rod Barrett (United Kingdom) Jay Shepherd
2008	Production Cup	ING Sport	BMW 320i	(United Kingdom) Ian Lawson (United Kingdom) Mike Wilds (United Kingdom) Anthony Wilds
2009	GT	MJC	Ferrari F360	(United Kingdom) Witt Gamski (United Kingdom) Keith Robinson
2009	Production	Intersport	BMW M3	(United Kingdom) Kevin Clarke (United Kingdom) Wayne Gibson
2010	GT	MJC	Ferrari 430	(United Kingdom) Witt Gamski (United Kingdom) Keith Robinson
2010	Production	Bullrun	SEAT Cupra	(United Kingdom) Richard Adams (United Kingdom) David Green
2011	GT	GT3 Racing with KJ & TG	Dodge Viper	(United Kingdom) Craig Wilkins (United Kingdom) Aaron Scott
2011	Production GTN	APO Sport	SEAT Leon	(United Kingdom) Alex Osbourne (United Kingdom) James May
2012	MSA British Endurance	Bullrun	Lotus Evora	(United Kingdom) Richard Adams (United Kingdom) David Green (United Kingdom) Martin Byford
2012	Production Cup	Daniels Motorsport	SEAT Leon	(United Kingdom) Edward Cockill (United Kingdom) Harry Cockill
2013	MSA British Endurance	Team Parker Racing	Porsche 997	(United Kingdom) Ian Loggie (United Kingdom) Chris Jones
2014	Endurance	FF Corse	Ferrari 458	(United Kingdom) David Mason (United Kingdom) Calum Lockie
2015	Endurance	FF Corse	Ferrari 458	(United Kingdom) David Mason (United Kingdom) Calum Lockie
2016	Dunlop Endurance Championship (Overall)	Tockwith Motorsport	Audi R8 LMS	(United Kingdom) Phil Hanson (United Kingdom) Nigel Moore
2016	Dunlop Endurance Championship (GT class)	Whitebridge Motorsport	Aston Martin Vantage GT4	(United Kingdom) Chris Murphy (United Kingdom) Jonathan Cocker
2016	Dunlop Endurance Championship (Production class)	Moss Motorsport	BMW M3 E46	(United Kingdom) Mike Moss (United Kingdom) Tom Howard (United Kingdom) Kevin Clarke
2017	Dunlop Endurance	MJC Furlonger	Ferrari 458 GTE	(United Kingdom) Witt Gamski (Scotland) Ross Wylie (United Kingdom) Joe Macari
2017	Dunlop Sprint	Track Focused	Porsche Cayman Clubsport GT4	(United Kingdom) Rick Nevinson (United Kingdom) Brad Nevinson (United Kingdom) Sean Cooper (United Kingdom) Matt Cherrington
2018	Dunlop Endurance	Tockwith Motorsport	Ginetta G50	(United Kingdom) Sarah Moore (United Kingdom) Matt Greenwood
2018	Dunlop Sprint	Moss Motorsport	BMW M3 E46	(United Kingdom) Jon Watt (United Kingdom) Kristian Prosser
2019	Dunlop Endurance	SB Race Engineering	Ferrari 488 Challenge	(United Kingdom) Paul Bailey (United Kingdom) Andy Schulz
2020	Dunlop Endurance	VR Motorsport	Praga R1T Evo	(United Kingdom) Danny Harrison (United Kingdom) Jem Hepworth
2020	Dunlop Trophy	JC Racing	BMW M3 E36	(United Kingdom) Oliver Smith
2021	Goodyear Britcar Endurance Championship (Praga class)	Tim Gray Motorsport	Praga R1	(United Kingdom) Richard Wells (United Kingdom) Alex Kapadia (United Kingdom) Tim Gray
2021	Goodyear Britcar Endurance Championship (Endurance class)	Motus One with Moorgate	McLaren 650S GT3	(United Kingdom) Will Powell (United Kingdom) David Scaramanga
2021	Goodyear Britcar Trophy	Woodrow Motorsport	BMW 1M E82	(United Kingdom) Simon Baker (United Kingdom) Kevin Clarke (United Kingdom) Ollie Reubens
2022	MSUK British Endurance Championship	Rob Boston Racing	Mercedes-AMG GT3	(United Kingdom) Wayne Marrs (United Kingdom) Tom Jackson
2022	Goodyear Britcar Trophy	Team BRIT	BMW M240i Racing	(United Kingdom) Chris Overend (United Kingdom) James Whitley (United Kingdom) Julian Thomas
2023	MSUK British Endurance Championship	Team HARD	Porsche 991 Cup	(United Kingdom) Bradley Thurston (Philippines) Daryl DeLeon
2023	ROWE Britcar Trophy	Dragon Sport	Renault Clio MkIV	(Wales) Rhys Lloyd (United Kingdom) Jack Meakin
2024	MSUK British Endurance Championship	PB Racing by JMH	Audi R8 GT3	(New Zealand) Peter Erceg (United Kingdom) Marcus Clutton (United Kingdom) Hugo Cook
2024	ROWE Britcar Trophy	TSR	Audi TT	(United Kingdom) Mark Jones (United Kingdom) Rob Ellick (United Kingdom) Craig Fleming
2025	Britcar Endurance Championship	Amspeed	Porsche 991.1 GT3 Cup	(United Kingdom) Dominic Malone (United Kingdom) Adam Smalley (United Kingdom) Dan Cammish (United Kingdom) Charles Rainford
2026	Britcar Endurance Championship	SG Racing	Porsche 991.2 Cup	(United Kingdom) Mark Cunningham (United Kingdom) Peter Cunningham

== History ==
The successful first year of competition was in 2002, and following tremendous growth in 2003, it attracted Sky Sports coverage in their Motor Sports section in 2004. The first year of the Britcar 24-Hour Race was 2005 which was won by Rollcentre Mosler of Martin Short. This was followed by packed grids in 2006 season culminating in a capacity field for the 24-Hours. EERC became a Motor Sports Association (MSA) approved Championship in 2007 as well being the now essential 24 hours. It played a supporting role to the British round of the A1 Grand Prix.

In 2011 it became known as the MSA British Endurance championship.

Such was its popularity in some seasons that over-subscription meant there are reserves waiting for grid positions.

For the 2017 season, the format was changed. Drivers in all races would now accrue points towards the Dunlop Endurance Championship but drivers could choose to do two 50-minute races under the Sprint category, or one 50-minute and one 2-hour race in the Endurance category. Grids were combined and most events were to take place over a single day to save costs. The night race proved so popular in 2016 that a second night race was introduced, to run at Silverstone earlier in the same month.

For the 2019 season the format was changed again, merging Endurance and Sprint categories into a single grid for two 60-minute races per weekend, finishing the season with a single 60- and a single 120-minute night race at Brands Hatch.

For 2020, Britcar introduced a Trophy category and a new series of shorter races named the Britcar Trophy Category for cars under Class 4 performance and the TCR and GT4 cars, for classes 5–7. The majority of these new classes are production cars, such as the Smart Forfour, Mini JCW R56 and the Honda Civic Type R (FK2) which were popular in Class 5. Some Trophy Category events ran alongside Endurance events, whilst other events ran dedicated Trophy cards with no Endurance or Praga rounds at the weekend.

Also in 2020, the Endurance grid saw several new Praga sportscar prototype R1 and R1T entries balanced into the existing Endurance class system. In 2021 these entries were given a dedicated class.

In 2020 Britcar ran as a support event for the FIA World Endurance Championship for the first time, at the 2020 6 Hours of Spa-Francorchamps event, with two non-championship races consisting of Endurance and Trophy cars plus non-Britcar cars with one-off entries made under class 1 through class 7 specifications. WEC had additionally extended the invite to support the 2020 Silverstone event, but that entire event including the WEC round was later cancelled.

(This marked the introduction of the relationship with WEC specifically; Britcar has raced outside the UK, including at Spa-Francorchamps, in many earlier years.)

In 2021 the title sponsor changed from Dunlop to Goodyear (the parent company) in line with the BTCC.

For 2022, Motorsport UK granted permission for Britcar to run their Endurance Championship with the title "British" and to increase the race duration from 1-hour to 2- and 3- hour, with the aim of running even longer races in the future. A new website and new social media channels were launched to support this change. Praga split off from Endurance to have grids of their own, run under the Britcar/BARC umbrella while the Trophy Championship continued unchanged.

For 2025, the Britcar organisation merged the Trophy and British Endurance championships into a single grid, running 8 rounds of two 45-minute or single 90-minute races.

Two additional classes were added for 2027: one for all Ginetta G55s, the variants balanced using weight, bhp and pitstop lengths; and one for Cayman 718 GT4s that left the Porsche Sprint Challenge.

== Silverstone Britcar 24-Hour ==
Britcar traditionally hosted an endurance race on the Silverstone GP circuit.

The presenters of the well-known British car show Top Gear, namely Jeremy Clarkson, Richard Hammond and James May - together with 'The Stig' - took part in the 2007 event, in a BMW 330d, coming third of the five diesel cars, and 39th overall, at the end of the 24 Hours.

At the end of the 2015 season, the rights for the Silverstone 24 hour endurance race were sold to Creventic to become the UK edition of their FIA "touring car" Endurance Series - although this round was then dropped in 2019.
