= James Whitley (alpine skier) =

British alpine skier

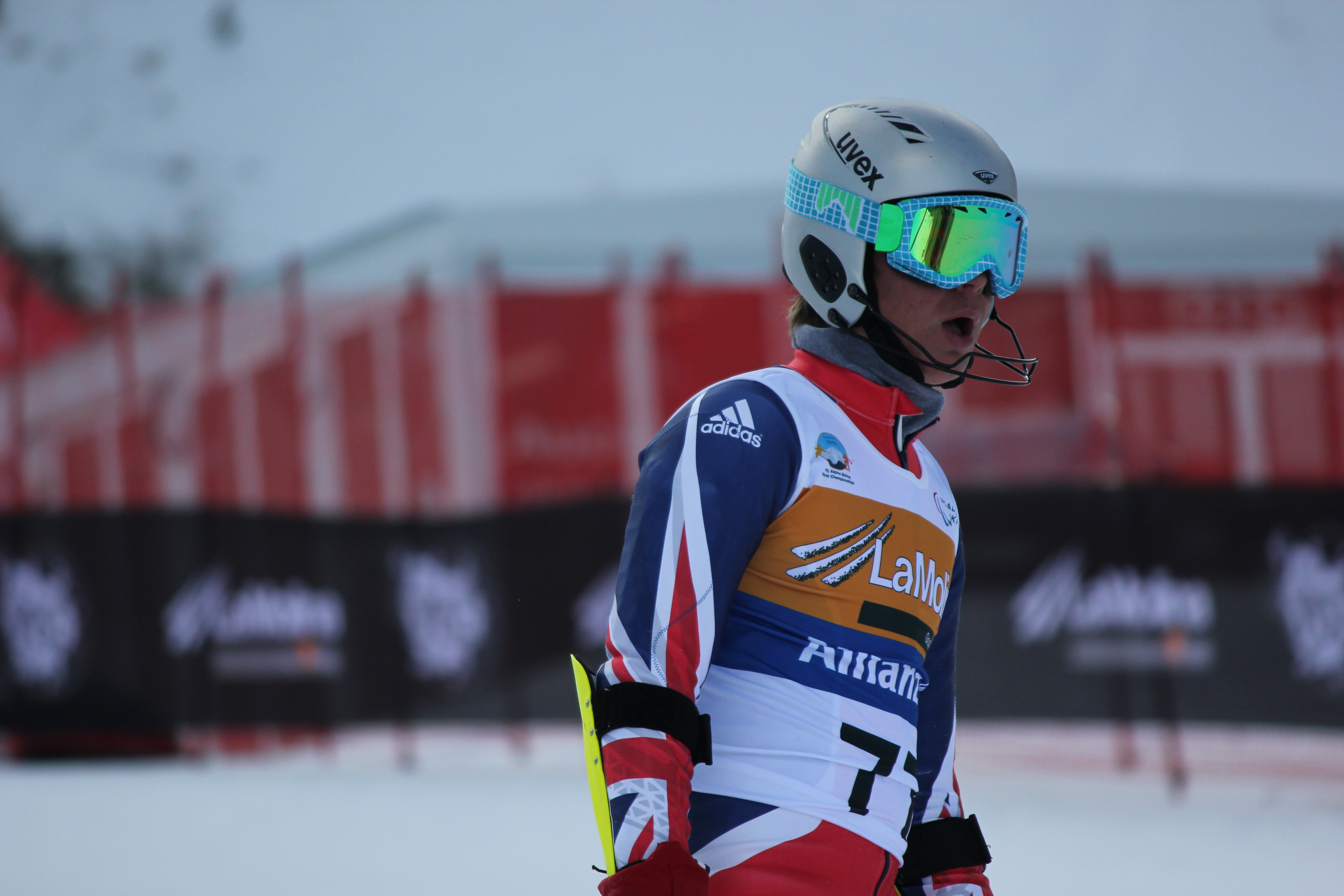
- Whitley at La Molina, 2013

Personal information
- Nationality: British
- Born: 17 November 1997 (age 28)

Sport
- Country: Great Britain
- Sport: Para alpine skiing
- Event(s): Slalom; Giant Slalom

Achievements and titles
- Paralympic finals: 2014 Sochi; 2018 Pyeongchang; 2022 Beijing

James Whitley (born 17 November 1997) is a British alpine skier, who competes in the slalom, giant slalom SuperG, Downhill and Super Combined events. A promising junior skier, Whitley qualified to represent Great Britain's team at the 2014 Winter Paralympics in Sochi for his debut Paralympics. In January 2018 it was announced by BPA (British Paralympic Association) and PSGB (ParaSnowSportsGB) that Whitley had been selected to compete in Pyeongchang in the 2018 Winter Paralympics. In February 2022, Whitley was named by the BPA as part of the ParalympicsGB squad for the Beijing 2022 Winter Paralympics.

== Personal history ==
Whitley was born on 17 November 1997. He is the grandson of James Chichester-Clark, Lord Moyola, the former Prime Minister of Northern Ireland. He spent his childhood in Sussex and at Castledawson in Northern Ireland. Whitley was born without both hands and despite multiple operations, fingers constructed for both his limbs have failed to gain enough nerve or muscle function. His Paralympic Class is LW5/7-3. He attended St. Bede's Preparatory School before going to Millfield School, a boarding school in Somerset, England.

== Skiing career ==
Whitley began skiing at the age of four years while with his family at Courchevel, France. He first trained with Ecole du Ski Français. He showed promise as a youth and in 2007, aged 10 was offered a place on the British Disabled Ski Team (BDST). He started to race with the British team when he was 11 in 2008. In 2012 he came second in the giant slalom and third in slalom at the Italian National Championships, his first senior medals. In 2013 Whitley entered the 2013 IPC Skiing World Championships in La Molina, where he finished 11th in the slalom.

In early 2014 it was announced that he had been selected for the Great Britain team at the 2014 Winter Paralympics in Sochi, competing in the standing events. This made him the only standing skier competing for ParalympicsGB. The 2014 Winter Paralympics was Whitley's debut Paralympics; he competed in the slalom (14th place) on 13 March 2014, and giant slalom (15th place) on the 15 March.

Whitley left school in 2016 and has competed full time since the beginning of the 2016/17 season. He competes in the Para Alpine Skiing World Cup (WPAS) in Slalom, Giant Slalom, SuperG, Downhill and Super Combined. He was British Champion in the inaugural British Para Alpine Championships in 2016 and again in 2017. He won gold in the Europa Cup Finals in Veysonnaz in 2017 and was 4th overall in the Europa Cup competition. In the World Cup he ended the season 5th in Super Combined and 9th in Slalom.

On 10 March 2022, Whitley secured his best-ever Paralympic result with a 6th-place finish in the giant slalom at the 2022 Winter Paralympics in Beijing.

== Motor racing career ==
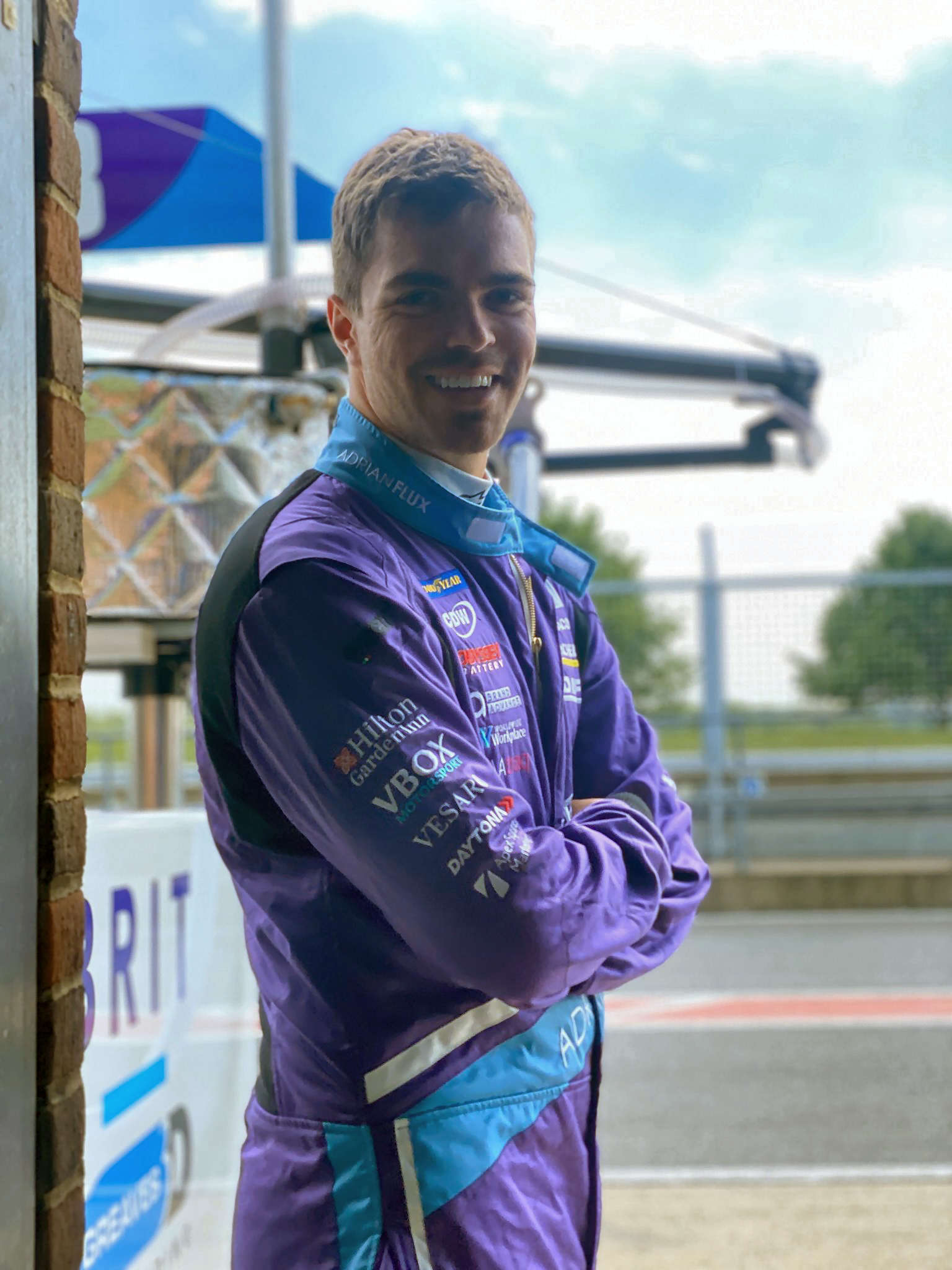
Whitley in Team Brit racing outfit Silverstone 2022

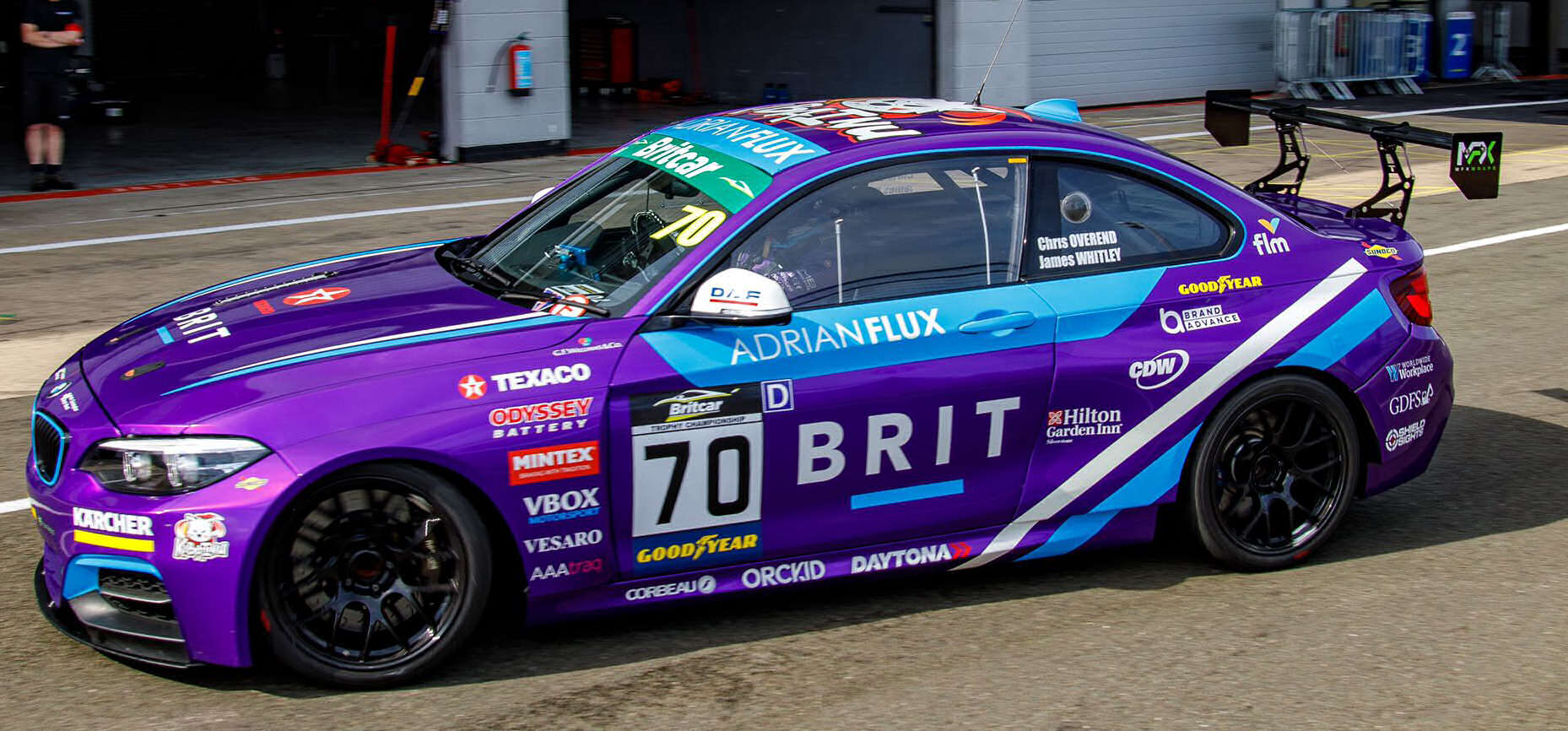
BMW M240i Racing edition car

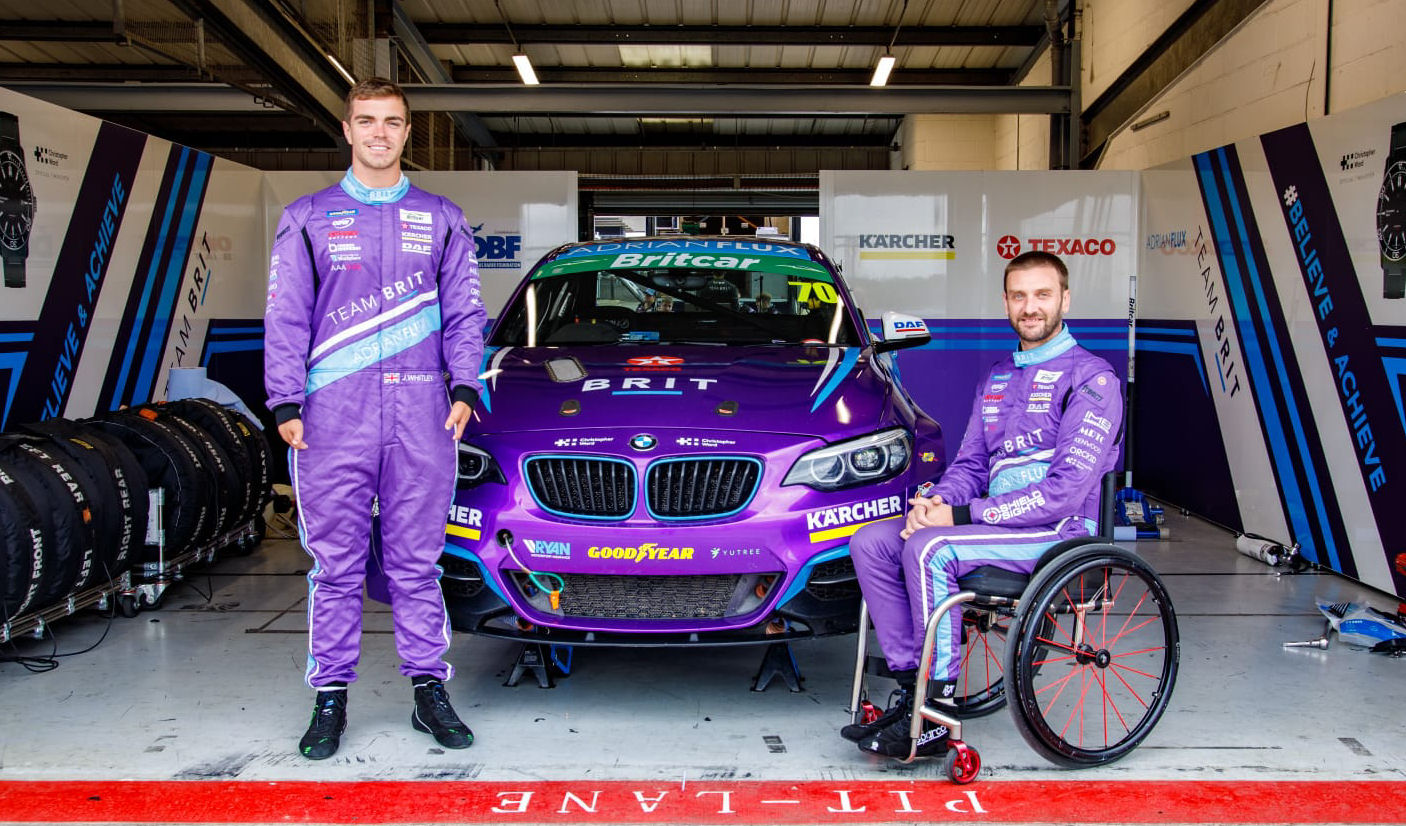
Championship winners Whitley and co-driver Overend at Donington Park Circuit

In 2021 Whitley joined Team BRIT and after gaining his racing licence competed alongside co-driver Chris Overend in a BMW M240i in class 2 of the 2022 Britcar Trophy Championship.

Britcar Trophy races are 50 minutes long with a driver change pit stop approximately halfway through, each race consisting of at least 30 cars competing in 5 different classes.

All event results are published by TSL Timing Solutions.

Race Results Team Brit BMW M240i

Race circuit	Date	Race number	Place in class	Drivers/Remarks
Silverstone	13-March-2022	1	3rd	Thomas/Overend + Fastest Lap
SIlverstone	13-March-2022	2	1st	Thomas/Overend + Fastest Lap
Snetterton	15-May-2022	1	3rd	Whitley/Overend + Fastest Lap
Snetterton	15-May-2022	2	1st	Overend/Whitley + Fastest Lap
Silverstone	4-Jun-2022	1	1st	Whitley/Overend + Fastest Lap
Silverstone	4-Jun-2022	2	1st	Overend/Whitley + Fastest Lap
Silverstone	19-June-2022	1	2nd	Whitley/Overend + Fastest Lap
Silverstone	19-June-2022	2	1st	Overend/Whitley + Fastest Lap
Donington	14-August-2022	1	2nd	Whitley/Overend
Donington	14-August-2022	2	1st	Overend/Whitley + Fastest Lap
Donington	23-October-2022	1	1st	Overend/Whitley + Fastest Lap
Donington	23-October-2022	2	2nd	Whitley/Overend

At the end of the season, James Whitley and Chris Overend were championship winners, becoming probably the only disabled drivers pairing to win a British national racing championship

In 2023, Whitley continued to partner Chris Overend in Team BRIT competing in the Britcar Endurance series, though both exited the team that year.
