= Team BRIT =

British auto racing team

(United Kingdom) Team BRIT
- Founded: 2015
- Team principal(s): Al Locke, Mike Scudamore
- Current series: Britcar
- Noted drivers: James Whitley, Jon Allan Butterworth, Caleb McDuff
- Teams' Championships: Britcar Trophy winners 2022
- Website: https://teambrit.co.uk

Team BRIT is a British auto racing team formed in 2015, originally based at Dunsfold Aerodrome in Surrey, home of the Top Gear test track, but now in Washington, West Sussex. The team is composed of disabled drivers and currently (2026) competes in three British motor racing series, the GT Cup Championship, Britcar Endurance and Snetterton Saloons, with the ultimate aim to race in 24 Hours of Le Mans as the first ever all-disabled team to compete.

The key element which allows physically disabled drivers to compete is the specially developed hand control system fitted to all the cars. Additional adaptations have also been developed to suit other disabilities including deafness.

== History ==
Team BRIT was formed as an offshoot of the charity Kartforce, which provides military veterans with the opportunity to take part in karting events to support their physical and mental rehabilitation and recovery. Team BRIT gives people with disabilities the chance to compete with able bodied drivers in national motor racing events. 1996 Formula One world champion Damon Hill is a patron of the team.

From its inception in 2015 with a single small racing car and three former military disabled drivers, the team has grown in size and scope.

In 2019 it opened its doors to all disabled drivers, promoting its expansion with a media launch supported by racing driver Nicolas Hamilton.

By 2022 it consisted of five cars and eight drivers with diverse backgrounds and disabilities, competing in three racing competitions.

In 2023, 9 drivers competed across four championships.

In 2024, 6 driver competed across two championships

In 2025, 6 drivers competed in one championship

In 2026, 7 drivers are competing in three championships.

== History of Cars Available ==
2015, 2016 - VW Golf GTI

2017 - 2 x Fun Cup Volkswagen Beetle

2018 - 3 x Fun Cup Volkswagen Beetle, Vw polo gti, Aston Martin Vantage GT4

2019, 2020 - 3 x BMW 116i, Aston Martin Vantage GT4

2021 - BMW 1 Series, Aston Martin Vantage GT4, BMW M240i Racing

At the end of 2021 the Vantage GT4 chassis became ineligible for competition in British GT, which follows SRO Motorsports Group international homologation rules. The team continued to campaign it in the Britcar Endurance Championship where it remained eligible in the equivalent "Class D" under Britcar series rules.

2022 - BMW 1 Series, Aston Martin Vantage GT4, BMW M240i Racing, McLaren 570S GT4

2023 - 2 x McLaren 570S GT4, BMW M240i Racing, 2023 also saw the addition of a Citroen C1 endurance race car, adapted and entered to the Silverlake C1 Endurance Series which includes a 24h round at the Silverstone circuit. - the addition of a second McLaren 570S replacing the Aston Martin in the Britcar Endurance Championship. - The other McLaren 570S will continue in British GT and McLaren Trophy The BMW M240i Racing will continue in the Britcar Trophy Championship.

2024 - McLaren 570S GT4 and BMW M240i and BMW 1 Series.

2025 - A second McLaren 570S GT4 joins the fleet as #38, the number #68 McLaren 570S GT4 and BMW M240i

2026 - The team competes in GT3 racing for the first time in a BMW M4 GT3. The McLaren 570S GT4 #68 and the BMW M240i.

== Hand Control Technology ==
Team BRIT worked with MME Motorsport, a Slovenian gearbox control specialist, to develop electronic hand control systems for throttle, clutch, gear change, and brakes which work in a seamlessly integrated way with conventional controls. The adaptation allows a driver using hand controls to share a car with a driver using conventional controls in race meetings; the car will respond to both sets of controls, giving priority to whichever input is highest if there is a conflict.

The growing development and realism of Sim racing systems allows a disabled driver to use the same steering wheel on the simulator as the racing car which aids a more seamless transition from sim racer to track racer.

== Key Milestones ==
In 2022 Team BRIT drivers James Whitley and Chris Overend made history in becoming the first disabled team to win a British national motor racing championship, claiming the Britcar Trophy Championship in an adapted BMW M240i Racing

In 2025, the team marked its 10 year anniversary and unveiled its first ever GT3 car.

In 2026, drivers Paul Fullick and Jamie Falvey set multiple records in their inaugural GT3 race for the team. On Saturday 11th April, the pair competed in round 1 of the GT Cup Championship at Donington Park Circuit, taking an outright win in race 1 and a P2 finish in race 2. At that point, no other disabled pairing had won a GT3 race outright, no other double bronze pairing had won a GT3 race outright and no other pair of drivers had won a GT3 race on what was a debut for both.

Race results in Trophy Class 2 to win the Championship
Circuit	Date	Position in Class	Driver 1	Driver 2
Silverstone	March 12	Race 1: 2, Race 2: 1	Julian Thomas	Chris Overend
Snetterton	May 15	Race 1: 3, Race 2: 1	Chris Overend	James Whitley
Silverstone	June 4	Race 1: 1, Race 2: 1	Chris Overend	James Whitley
Silverstone	June 19	Race 1: 2, Race 2: 1	Chris Overend	James Whitley
Donington	Aug 14	Race 1: 3, Race 2: 1	Chris Overend	James Whitley
Donington	Oct 21	Race 1: 1, Race 2: 5	Chris Overend	James Whitley

== Race Results 2023 ==
Competition	Circuit	Date	Position in Class	Driver 1	Driver 2	Driver 3	Driver 4
Silverlake C1 Endurance	Silverstone GP	March 19	54	Yvonne Houfelaar	Asha Silva	Noah Cosby	
Britcar Endurance	Silverstone GP	March 25	5	Chris Overend	James Whitley		
Britcar Trophy	Silverstone GP	March 26	Race 1: 7, Race 2: 9	Paul Fullick	Tyrone Mathurin		
Intelligent Money British GT	Oulton Park	April 10	Race 1: 6, Race 2: 6	Aaron Morgan	Bobby Trundley		
Britcar Endurance	Brands Hatch Indy	April 22	3	James Whitley	Chris Overend		
Silverlake C1 Endurance	Oulton Park	April 22	29	Yvonne Houfelaar	Asha Silva	Noah Cosby	
Britcar Trophy	Brands Hatch Indy	April 23	2	Paul Fullick	Tyrone Mathurin		
Intelligent Money British GT	Silverstone 500	May 7	DNF	Aaron Morgan	Bobby Trundley		
Silverlake C1 Endurance 24hr	Silverstone GP	May 20-21	47	Noah Crosby	Asha Silva	Paul Fullick	Steve Crompton
Britcar Trophy	Oulton Park	May 27	Race 1: DNS, Race 2: 2	Paul Fullick	Tyrone Mathurin		
Britcar Endurance	Oulton Park	May 27	4	Chris Overend	Bobby Trundley		
McLaren Trophy	Paul Ricard	June 3	2	Aaron Morgan	Bobby Trundley		
McLaren Trophy	Paul Ricard	June 4	2	Aaron Morgan	Bobby Trundley		
Silverlake C1 Endurance	Donington Park	June 18	40	Asha Silva	Paul Fullick	Noah Cosby	
Britcar Endurance	Silverstone GP	June 24	Did not enter				
Britcar Trophy	Silverstone GP	June 25	3	Paul Fullick	Tyrone Mathurin		
McLaren Trophy	Spa Francorchamps	June 30	2	Bobby Trundley	Aaron Morgan		
McLaren Trophy	Spa Francorchamps	July 1	Race cancelled	Bobby Trundley	Aaron Morgan		
BARC Britcar 6 hour	Donington Park	July 22	570S P2 in race	Bobby Trundley	Chris Overend	Paul Fullick	James Whitley
Silverlake C1 Endurance	Snetterton	July23	26	Gabriela Jílková	Paul Fullick	Asha Silva	Anji Vadgama Silva
McLaren Trophy	Nurburgring	July 29	1	Bobby Trundley	Aaron Morgan		
McLaren Trophy	Nurburgring	July 30	DNF	Aaron Morgan	Bobby Trundley		
Silverlake C1 Endurance	Brands Hatch	Aug 19	21	Asha Silva	Noah Cosby	Steve Crompton	
Intelligent Money British GT	Brands Hatch	Sep 10	6	Aaron Morgan	Bobby Trundley		
Britcar Endurance	Donington Park	Oct 14	1 (D Invitation)	James Whitley	Paul Fullick		
Britcar Endurance	Donington Park	Oct 14	4	Aaron Morgan	Takuma Aoki		

Following a crash at Silverstone 500 on May 7 when the car suffered extensive damage, the team decided to withdraw from the majority of the remaining rounds of the British GT championship and instead drivers Morgan and Trundley will race the remaining Maclaren 570S in the MacLaren Trophy Championship

== Championship Results 2023 ==
Paul Fullick and Tyrone Mathurin finished 21st overall in the Rowe Britcar Trophy Championship and 2nd in class driving the BMW M240i.

Chris Overend / James Whitley / Bobby Trundley / Aaron Morgan / Takuma Aoki finished 13th overall in the Motorsport Uk British Endurance Championship and 5th in class driving the Mclaren 570S GT4.

In the Intelligent Money British GT Championship neither the team or the drivers gained any points.

== Race Results 2024 ==
Competition	Circuit	Date	Car	Position in Class	Driver 1	Driver 2
British Endurance	Donington Park	March 29	McLaren 570S	4	Aaron Morgan	Paul Fullick
Britcar Trophy	Donington Park	March 30	BMW M240i	Race 1 : 4 Race 2 : 2	Noah Cosby	Asha Silva
Britcar Trophy	Donington Park	March 30	BMW 1 Series	Race 1 : 4 Race 2 : NC	Dom Shore	Caleb McDuff
British Endurance	Snetterton	April 13	McLaren 570S	1	Aaron Morgan	Paul Fullick
Britcar Trophy	Snetterton	April 14	BMW M240i	Race 1 : 1 Race 2 : 2	Noah Cosby	Asha Silva
British Trophy	Snetterton	April 14	BMW 1 Series	Race 1 : 5 Race 2 : 3	Caleb McDuff	
Britcar Trophy	Brands Hatch	May 4	BMW M240i	Race 1 : 4	Noah Cosby	Asha Silva
Britcar Trophy	Brands Hatch	May 4	BMW 1 Series	Race 1 : 4	Bobby Trundley	Caleb McDuff
Britcar Trophy	Brands Hatch	May 5	BMW M240i	Race 2 : 2	Noah Cosby	Asha Silva
Britcar Trophy	Brands Hatch	May 5	BMW 1 Series	Race 2 : 3	Bobby Trundley	Caleb McDuff
British Endurance	Silverstone	June 15	McLaren 570S	2	Aaron Morgan	Paul Fullick
British Endurance	Silverstone	June 15	McLaren 570S	4	Bobby Trundley	Charles Graham
Britcar Trophy	Silverstone	June 16	BMW M240i	Race 1 : 1 Race 2 : 2	Noah Cosby	Asha Silva
Britcar Trophy	Silverstone	June 16	BMW 1 Series	Race 1 : 2 Race 2 : 2	Bobby Trundley	Caleb McDuff
British Endurance	Donington	August 10	McLaren 570S	3	Aaron Morgan	Paul Fullick
Britcar Trophy	Donington	August 11	BMW 240i	Race 1 : 2 Race 2 : 2	Noah Cosby	
Britcar Trophy	Donington	August 11	BMW 1 Series	Race 1 : 2 Race 2 : 1	Caleb McDuff	Dom Shore
British Endurance	Snetterton	September 14	McLaren 570S	2	Aaron Morgan	Paul Fullick
British Endurance	Snetterton	September 14	McLaren 570S	3	Takuma Aoki	Noah Cosby
Britcar Trophy	Snetterton	September 15	BMW 240i	Race 1 : 2 Race 2 : 1	Caleb McDuff	Asha Silva
Britcar Trophy	Snetterton	September 15	BMW 1 Series	Race 1 : 1 Race 2 : 1	Dom Shore	Bobby Trundley

== Gallery ==
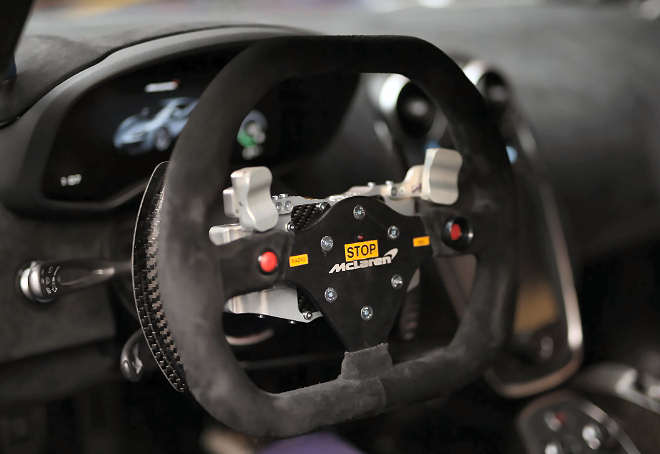
Racing steering wheel with hand controls for all functions

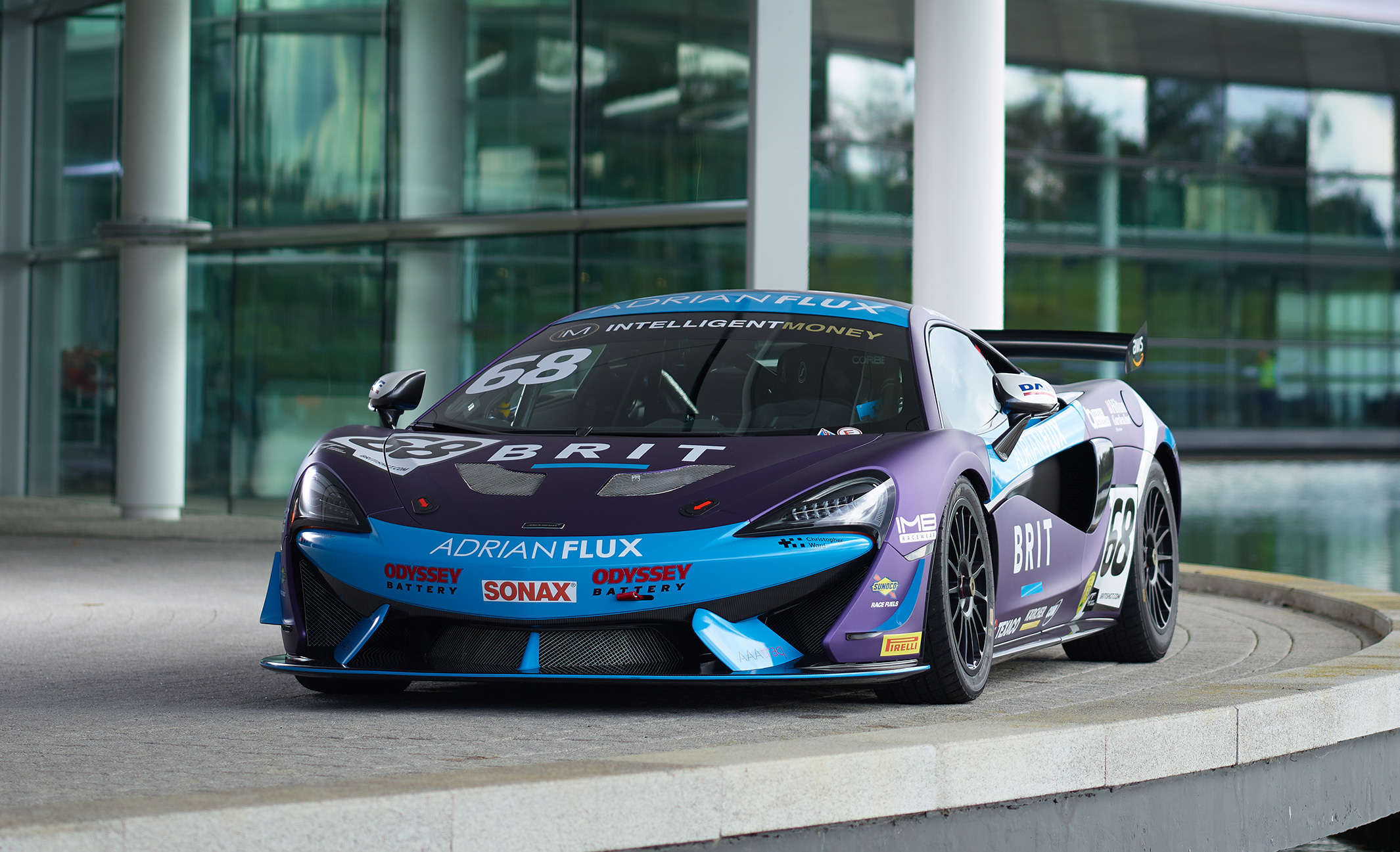
McLaren 570S GT4

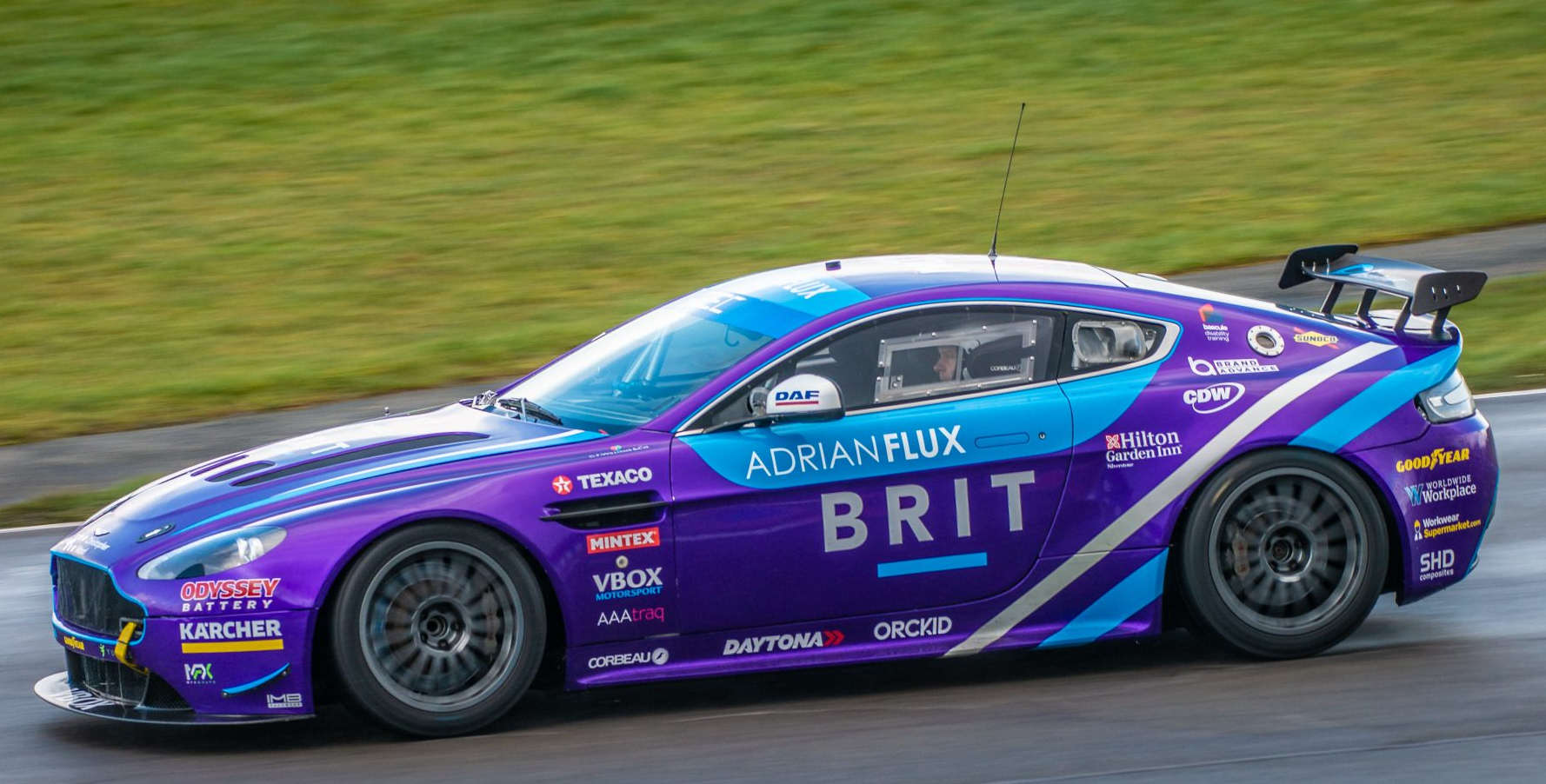
Aston Martin Vantage GT4

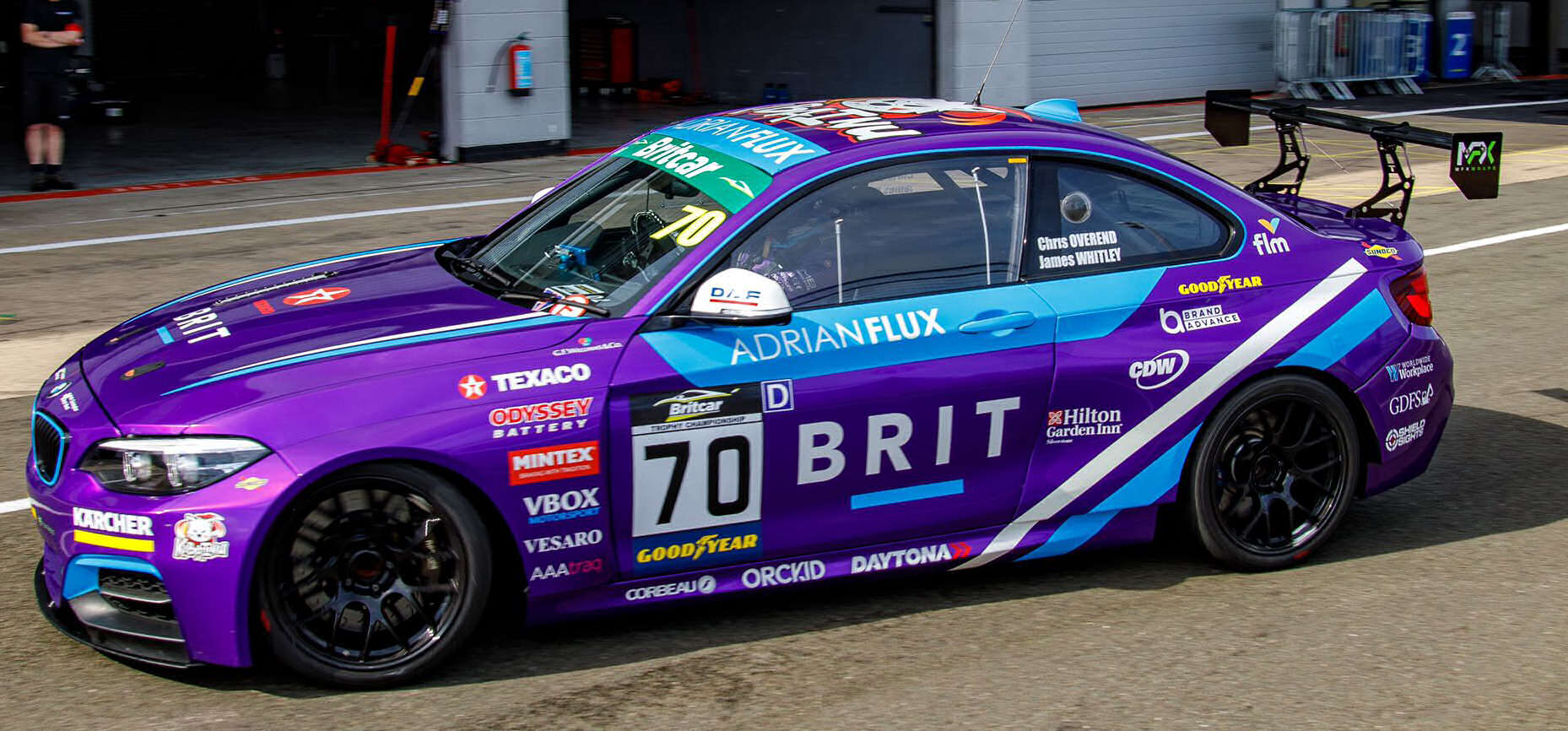
BMW M240i

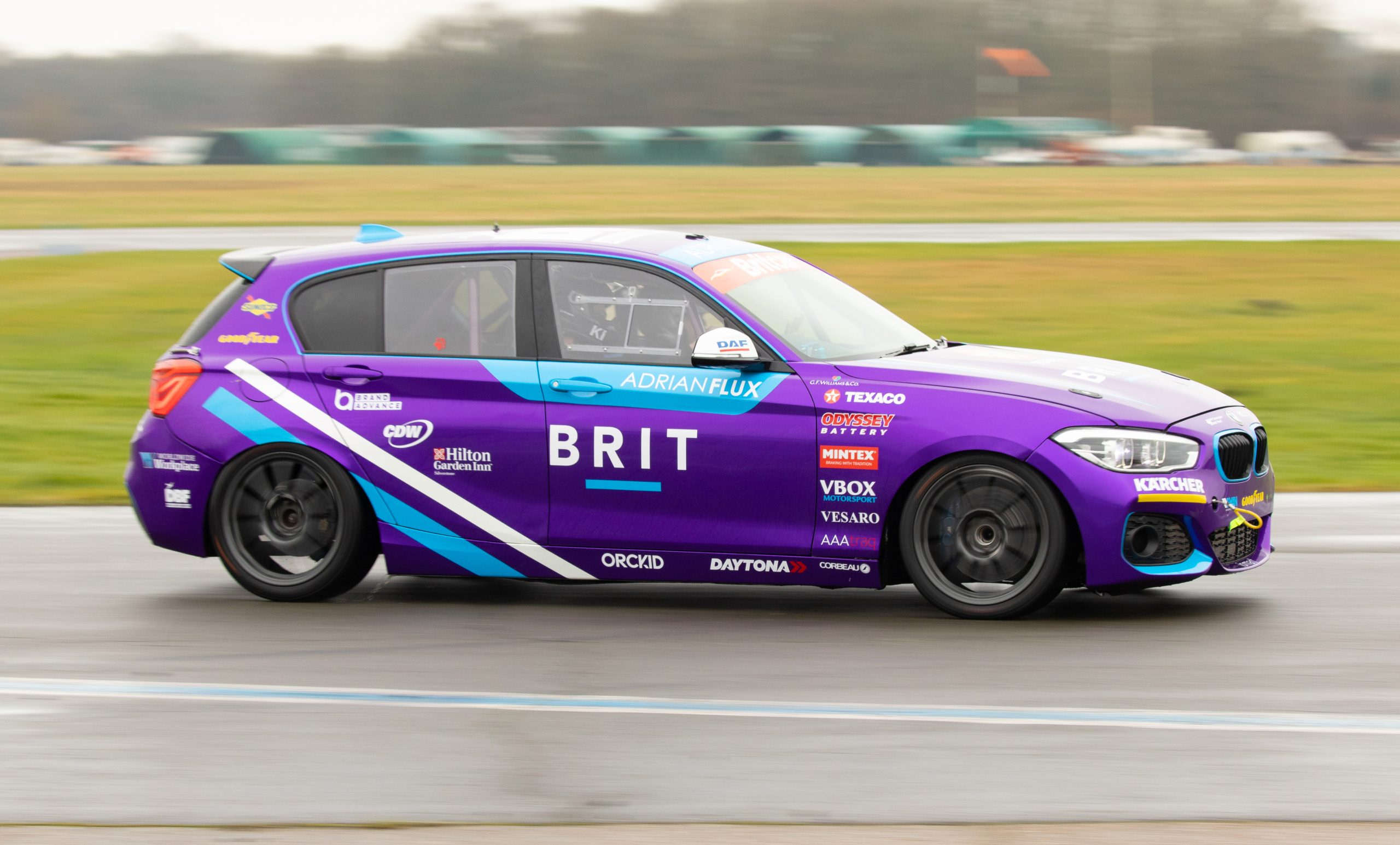
BMW 1 Series

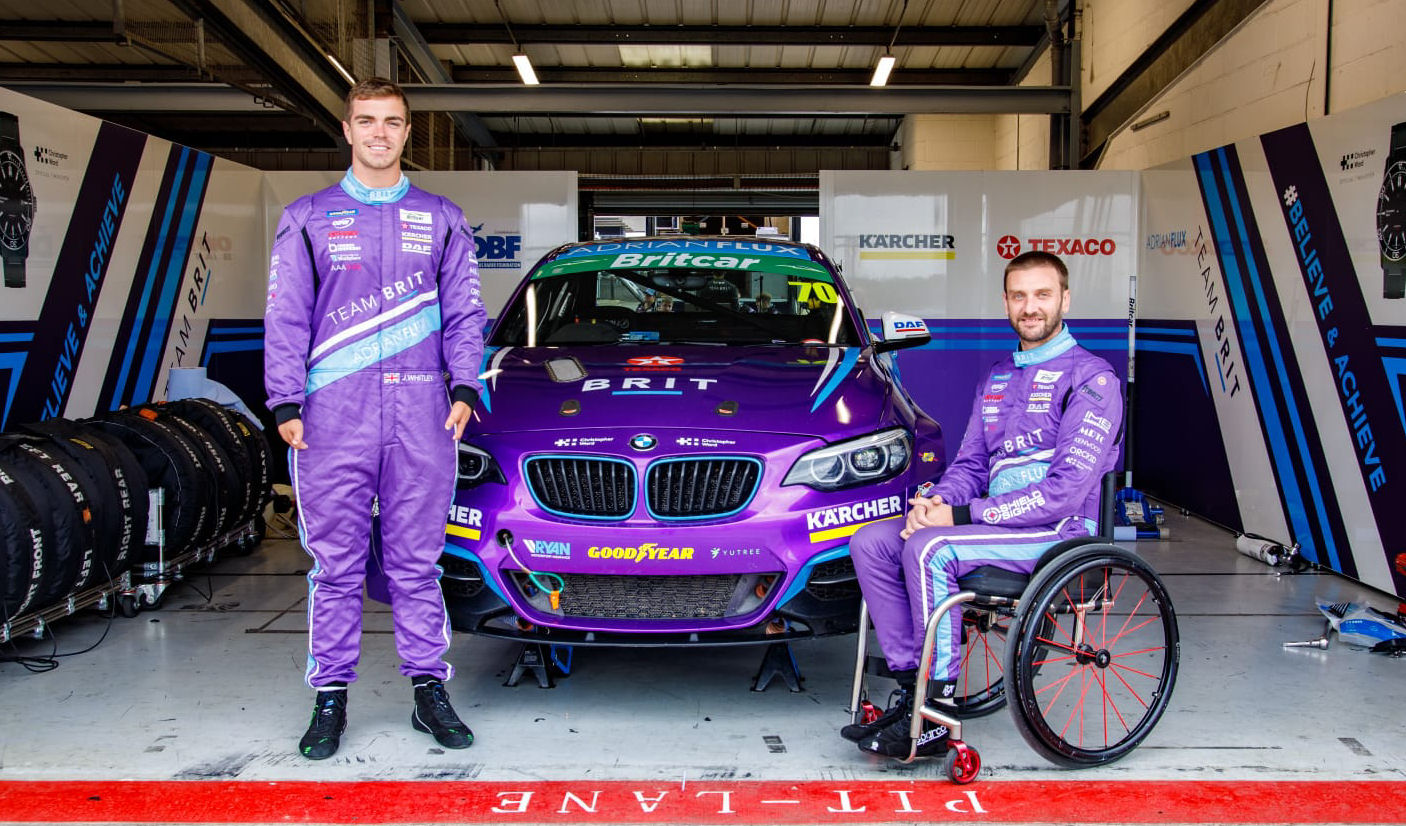
Winners of the Britcar Trophy Championship 2022
