= Ginetta G40 =

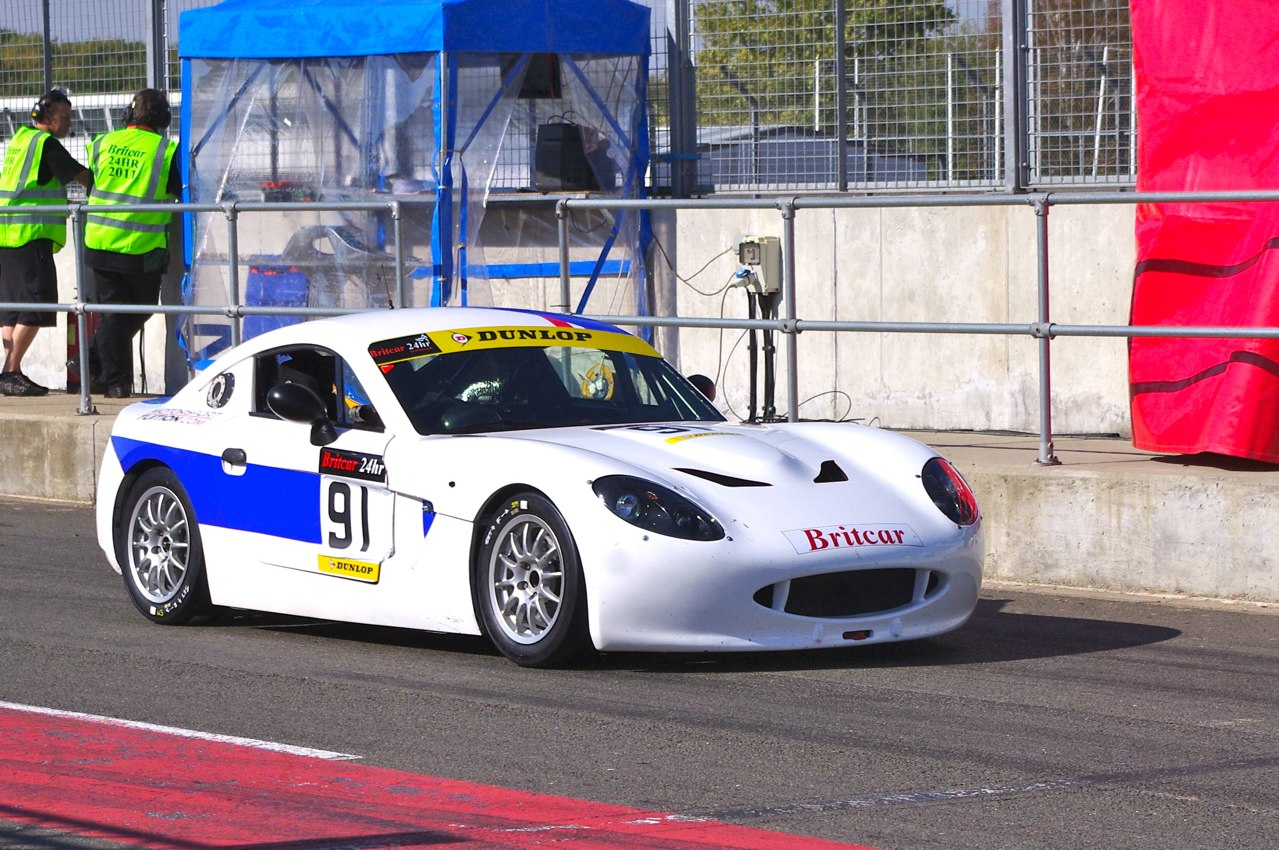
- Piranha Motorsport's Ginetta G40 at Britcar 24 Hours 2011

Overview
- Manufacturer: Ginetta Cars
- Production: 2008–present
- Assembly: Leeds, West Yorkshire, England

Body and chassis
- Class: Sports car (S)
- Body style: 2-door coupé
- Layout: Front-engine, rear wheel drive

Powertrain
- Engine: 2.0 L Mazda MZR I4 (road version); 1.8 L Ford Zetec I4 (race version)
- Transmission: Mazda 6-speed manual (road version); 5-speed manual (early race versions); Quaife 6-speed sequential manual (newer race versions)

Dimensions
- Wheelbase: 2,250 mm (88.6 in)
- Length: 3,748 mm (147.6 in)
- Width: 1,642 mm (64.6 in)
- Height: 1,045 mm (41.1 in)
- Kerb weight: 795 kg (1,753 lb) (road version); 800–850 kg (1,764–1,874 lb) (race version)

Chronology
- Predecessor: Ginetta G50 (road version); Ginetta G20 (race version)

The Ginetta G40 is a sports car which has been built by Ginetta Cars since 2008. It is available in two versions; a road-going version, named the G40R, and the race version, the G40, which is available in two specifications; one of which is the G40 Challenge, the other is the G40 Junior, which were designed for the Ginetta GT5 Challenge and the Ginetta Junior Championship respectively. The G40 replaced the Ginetta G20 race car, and also replaced the road version of the Ginetta G50.

== Race versions ==
The Ginetta G40 Challenge was introduced in 2008, supplementing the Ginetta G20 in the one-make Ginetta GT5 Challenge. At launch, the car used a 1.8-litre Ford Zetec-based inline-four engine, generating a power output of 140 hp (104 kW; 142 PS), and using a 5-speed gearbox, with the car weighing 850 kg (1,874 lb). The car was available in 2008 for £24,950, plus VAT, and featured 280mm discs all round. The engine in the most recent versions generate 165 hp (123 kW; 167 PS), and weigh 800 kg (1,764 lb), using 6-speed Quaife sequential gearboxes. It received Autosport's National Car of the Year Award for 2009, two years after the G50 had received the same award.

In addition to the Ginetta Junior Championship, the G40 has been entered in the Britcar series. In the latter series, it won its class at the Britcar 24 Hours, held at the Silverstone Circuit on its debut in 2010, and finished 12th overall, driven by the works Team LNT team's drivers Lawrence Tomlinson, Mike Simpson, Steve Linn and Nigel Moore, also proving to be the fastest Ginetta, as it finished one place ahead of a GT4-class Ginetta G50. At the 2011 edition of the race, the top G40 finished 26th overall, and fourth in class; this time entered by Rollcentre Racing, and driven by Richard Skyes, Jake Rattenbury, Brian Saunders and Mark Davies. In 2012, a G40 once again finished 12th overall, and fourth in class; this time, driven by Piranha Motorsport's Simon Mason, Rory Bryant, Ryan Ratcliffe and Chris Bialan.

Ginetta also built a less powerful variant of the G40, named the G40 Junior. This utilizes a restricted 100 hp (75 kW; 101 PS) version of the 1.8-litre Zetec engine, to comply with MSA regulations, and was used in the Ginetta Junior Championship (replacing the G20), a series for 14 to 17-year old drivers that is part of the British Touring Car Championship's support package. Initially run on Michelin Pilot Cup tyres, which were treaded, the series moved to slick tyres for 2012, only to revert to treaded tyres for 2013.

== Road version ==
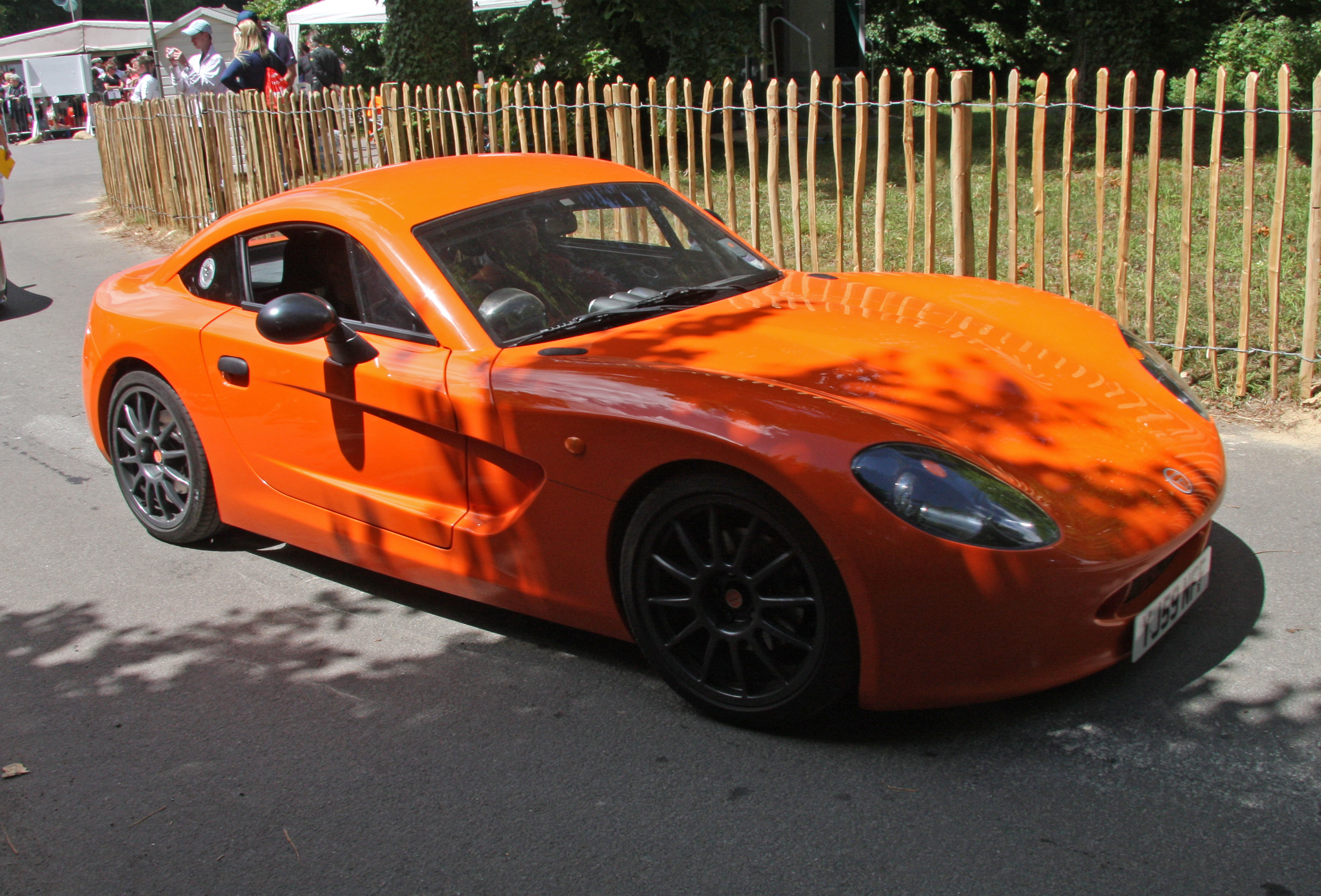
Ginetta G40 road car

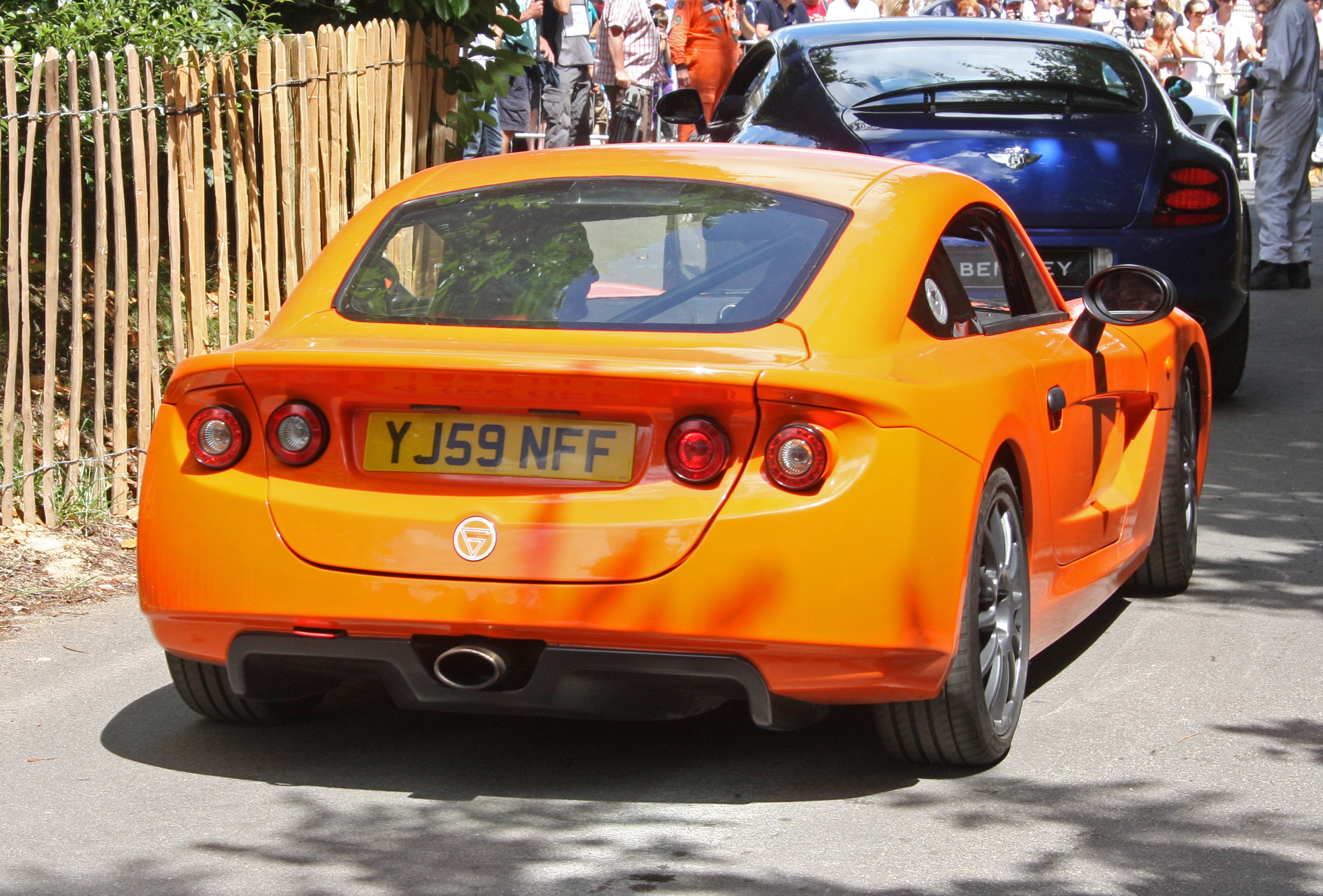
Ginetta G40 road car rear

In 2010, Ginetta decided to cancel plans to produce a road-going version of the bigger Ginetta G50, and instead built a road-going variant of the G40, named the G40R. The race car's 1.8-litre Zetec engine was replaced with a modified 2.0-litre Mazda MZR engine, generating a power output of 175 hp (130 kW; 177 PS) at 7,000rpm and the 6-speed manual gearbox shared with the Mazda MX5; however, the road car also includes the full race-spec rollcage. This configuration enables the car to accelerate from a standing start to 97km/h in 5.8 seconds and attain a claimed top speed of 225 km/h (140 mph), the performance figures aided by its low weight of 795 kg (1,753 lb). Ginetta claim a fuel economy figure of 29 mpg, and carbon dioxide emissions of 181g/km. Prices started at £29,950. Autocar gave the car a rating of 4 out of 5; praising the car's engine note and driving feel, but criticizing it for inconsistent steering weight and for an unfinished cabin. What Car? gave the car a rating of 3 out of 5, praising its performance and handling, but criticizing its lack of safety features, its poor refinement, and its lack of equipment. The Telegraph gave the car 4 out of 5 stars, praising its driving feel, but criticizing the body's finish. Auto Express gave the car 3 out of 5, praising its on-track behaviour, but stating that it wasn't really suited to everyday usage. Ginetta planned to sell 100 cars annually.

== See also ==
- Ginetta GT5 Challenge
- Ginetta Junior Championship
