= 2020 4 Hours of Spa-Francorchamps =

Sportscar racing event

The layout of Circuit de Spa-Francorchamps, where the race was held

The 2020 4 Hours of Spa-Francorchamps was an endurance sportscar racing event held on August 9, 2020, at the Circuit de Spa-Francorchamps. It was the second round of the 2020 European Le Mans Series and the fifth running of the event as part of the ELMS. The race was won by the #32 United Autosports run Oreca 07-Gibson driven by Phil Hanson and Filipe Albuquerque.

== Race ==
=== Race results ===
Class winners are in bold and ‡.

Pos	Class	No	Team	Drivers	Chassis	Tyre	Laps	Time/Retired
Pos	Class	No	Team	Drivers	Engine	Tyre	Laps	Time/Retired
1	**LMP2**	**22**	**(United Kingdom) United Autosports**	**(United Kingdom) Phil Hanson** **(Portugal) Filipe Albuquerque**	**Oreca 07**	M	**100**	**4:02:01.361‡**
1	**LMP2**	**22**	**(United Kingdom) United Autosports**	**(United Kingdom) Phil Hanson** **(Portugal) Filipe Albuquerque**	**Gibson GK428 4.2 L V8**	M	**100**	**4:02:01.361‡**
2	LMP2	39	(France) Graff	(Australia) James Allen (France) Alexandre Cougnaud (France) Thomas Laurent	Oreca 07	M	100	+58.163
2	LMP2	39	(France) Graff	(Australia) James Allen (France) Alexandre Cougnaud (France) Thomas Laurent	Gibson GK428 4.2 L V8	M	100	+58.163
3	LMP2	31	(France) Panis Racing	(France) Julien Canal (France) Nico Jamin (United Kingdom) Will Stevens	Oreca 07	G	100	+1:01.115
3	LMP2	31	(France) Panis Racing	(France) Julien Canal (France) Nico Jamin (United Kingdom) Will Stevens	Gibson GK428 4.2 L V8	G	100	+1:01.115
4	LMP2	30	(France) Duqueine Engineering	(France) Tristan Gommendy (Switzerland) Jonathan Hirschi (Russia) Konstantin Tereshchenko	Oreca 07	M	100	+1:14.321
4	LMP2	30	(France) Duqueine Engineering	(France) Tristan Gommendy (Switzerland) Jonathan Hirschi (Russia) Konstantin Tereshchenko	Gibson GK428 4.2 L V8	M	100	+1:14.321
5	LMP2	32	(United Kingdom) United Autosports	(United Kingdom) Alex Brundle (United States) William Owen (Netherlands) Job van Uitert	Oreca 07	M	100	+1:23.874
5	LMP2	32	(United Kingdom) United Autosports	(United Kingdom) Alex Brundle (United States) William Owen (Netherlands) Job van Uitert	Gibson GK428 4.2 L V8	M	100	+1:23.874
6	LMP2	50	(Switzerland) Richard Mille Racing Team	(Colombia) Tatiana Calderón (Brazil) André Negrão (Netherlands) Beitske Visser	Oreca 07	M	100	+1:26.147
6	LMP2	50	(Switzerland) Richard Mille Racing Team	(Colombia) Tatiana Calderón (Brazil) André Negrão (Netherlands) Beitske Visser	Gibson GK428 4.2 L V8	M	100	+1:26.147
7	LMP2	28	(France) IDEC Sport	(United Kingdom) Richard Bradley (France) Paul Lafargue (France) Paul-Loup Chatin	Oreca 07	M	100	+1:30.363
7	LMP2	28	(France) IDEC Sport	(United Kingdom) Richard Bradley (France) Paul Lafargue (France) Paul-Loup Chatin	Gibson GK428 4.2 L V8	M	100	+1:30.363
8	LMP2	38	(United Kingdom) Jota Sport	(United Kingdom) Anthony Davidson (United Kingdom) Jake Dennis (Mexico) Roberto González	Oreca 07	G	100	+2:02.400
8	LMP2	38	(United Kingdom) Jota Sport	(United Kingdom) Anthony Davidson (United Kingdom) Jake Dennis (Mexico) Roberto González	Gibson GK428 4.2 L V8	G	100	+2:02.400
9	LMP2	25	(Portugal) Algarve Pro Racing	(France) Gabriel Aubry (United States) John Falb (Switzerland) Simon Trummer	Oreca 07	G	99	+1 Lap
9	LMP2	25	(Portugal) Algarve Pro Racing	(France) Gabriel Aubry (United States) John Falb (Switzerland) Simon Trummer	Gibson GK428 4.2 L V8	G	99	+1 Lap
10	LMP2	37	(Switzerland) Cool Racing	(Switzerland) Antonin Borga (Switzerland) Alexandre Coigny (France) Nicolas Lapierre	Oreca 07	M	99	+1 Lap
10	LMP2	37	(Switzerland) Cool Racing	(Switzerland) Antonin Borga (Switzerland) Alexandre Coigny (France) Nicolas Lapierre	Gibson GK428 4.2 L V8	M	99	+1 Lap
11	LMP2	34	(Poland) Inter Europol Competition	(Austria) René Binder (Russia) Matevos Isaakyan (Poland) Jakub Śmiechowski	Ligier JS P217	M	99	+1 Lap
11	LMP2	34	(Poland) Inter Europol Competition	(Austria) René Binder (Russia) Matevos Isaakyan (Poland) Jakub Śmiechowski	Gibson GK428 4.2 L V8	M	99	+1 Lap
12	LMP2	24	(Portugal) Algarve Pro Racing	(Sweden) Henning Enqvist (United Kingdom) Jon Lancaster (France) Loïc Duval	Oreca 07	G	99	+1 Lap
12	LMP2	24	(Portugal) Algarve Pro Racing	(Sweden) Henning Enqvist (United Kingdom) Jon Lancaster (France) Loïc Duval	Gibson GK428 4.2 L V8	G	99	+1 Lap
13	LMP2	20	(Denmark) High Class Racing	(Denmark) Dennis Andersen (Denmark) Anders Fjordbach	Oreca 07	M	98	+2 Laps
13	LMP2	20	(Denmark) High Class Racing	(Denmark) Dennis Andersen (Denmark) Anders Fjordbach	Gibson GK428 4.2 L V8	M	98	+2 Laps
14	LMP2	21	(United States) DragonSpeed	(United Kingdom) Ben Hanley (Mexico) Memo Rojas (Republic of Ireland) Ryan Cullen	Oreca 07	M	98	+2 Laps
14	LMP2	21	(United States) DragonSpeed	(United Kingdom) Ben Hanley (Mexico) Memo Rojas (Republic of Ireland) Ryan Cullen	Gibson GK428 4.2 L V8	M	98	+2 Laps
15	**LMP3**	**2**	**(United Kingdom) United Autosports**	**(United Kingdom) Wayne Boyd** **(United Kingdom) Tom Gamble** **(United Kingdom) Robert Wheldon**	**Ligier JS P320**	M	**95**	**+5 Laps‡**
15	**LMP3**	**2**	**(United Kingdom) United Autosports**	**(United Kingdom) Wayne Boyd** **(United Kingdom) Tom Gamble** **(United Kingdom) Robert Wheldon**	**Nissan VK56DE 5.6 L V8**	M	**95**	**+5 Laps‡**
16	LMP3	7	(United Kingdom) Nielsen Racing	(United Kingdom) Colin Noble (United Kingdom) Anthony Wells	Duqueine M30 – D08	M	95	+5 Laps
16	LMP3	7	(United Kingdom) Nielsen Racing	(United Kingdom) Colin Noble (United Kingdom) Anthony Wells	Nissan VK56DE 5.6 L V8	M	95	+5 Laps
17	**LMGTE**	**74**	**(Switzerland) Kessel Racing**	**(Poland) Michael Broniszewski** **(South Africa) David Perel** **(Brazil) Marcos Gomes**	**Ferrari 488 GTE Evo**	G	**94**	**+6 Laps‡**
17	**LMGTE**	**74**	**(Switzerland) Kessel Racing**	**(Poland) Michael Broniszewski** **(South Africa) David Perel** **(Brazil) Marcos Gomes**	**Ferrari F154CB 3.9 L Turbo V8**	G	**94**	**+6 Laps‡**
18	LMGTE	88	(Italy) AF Corse	(France) Emmanuel Collard (France) François Perrodo (United Kingdom) Harrison Newey	Ferrari 488 GTE Evo	G	94	+6 Laps
18	LMGTE	88	(Italy) AF Corse	(France) Emmanuel Collard (France) François Perrodo (United Kingdom) Harrison Newey	Ferrari F154CB 3.9 L Turbo V8	G	94	+6 Laps
19	LMGTE	98	(United Kingdom) Aston Martin Racing	(Canada) Paul Dalla Lana (Austria) Mathias Lauda (Brazil) Augusto Farfus	Aston Martin Vantage AMR	G	93	+7 Laps
19	LMGTE	98	(United Kingdom) Aston Martin Racing	(Canada) Paul Dalla Lana (Austria) Mathias Lauda (Brazil) Augusto Farfus	Aston Martin 4.0 L Turbo V8	G	93	+7 Laps
20	LMGTE	93	(Germany) Proton Competition	(Republic of Ireland) Michael Fassbender (Germany) Felipe Fernández Laser (Austria) Richard Lietz	Porsche 911 RSR	G	93	+7 Laps
20	LMGTE	93	(Germany) Proton Competition	(Republic of Ireland) Michael Fassbender (Germany) Felipe Fernández Laser (Austria) Richard Lietz	Porsche 4.0 L Flat-6	G	93	+7 Laps
21	LMGTE	55	(Switzerland) Spirit of Race	(United Kingdom) Duncan Cameron (Republic of Ireland) Matt Griffin (United Kingdom) Aaron Scott	Ferrari 488 GTE Evo	G	93	+7 Laps
21	LMGTE	55	(Switzerland) Spirit of Race	(United Kingdom) Duncan Cameron (Republic of Ireland) Matt Griffin (United Kingdom) Aaron Scott	Ferrari F154CB 3.9 L Turbo V8	G	93	+7 Laps
22	LMP3	11	(United States) Eurointernational	(Finland) Niko Kari (Brazil) Thomas Erdos (Greece) Andreas Laskaratos	Ligier JS P320	M	93	+7 Laps
22	LMP3	11	(United States) Eurointernational	(Finland) Niko Kari (Brazil) Thomas Erdos (Greece) Andreas Laskaratos	Nissan VK56DE 5.6 L V8	M	93	+7 Laps
23	LMP3	9	(France) Graff	(France) Vincent Capillaire (France) Arnold Robin (France) Maxime Robin	Ligier JS P320	M	93	+7 Laps
23	LMP3	9	(France) Graff	(France) Vincent Capillaire (France) Arnold Robin (France) Maxime Robin	Nissan VK56DE 5.6 L V8	M	93	+7 Laps
24	LMP3	3	(United Kingdom) United Autosports	(United Kingdom) Andrew Bentley (United Kingdom) Duncan Tappy (United States) Jim McGuire	Ligier JS P320	M	93	+7 Laps
24	LMP3	3	(United Kingdom) United Autosports	(United Kingdom) Andrew Bentley (United Kingdom) Duncan Tappy (United States) Jim McGuire	Nissan VK56DE 5.6 L V8	M	93	+7 Laps
25	LMP3	4	(Luxembourg) DKR Engineering	(Germany) Laurents Hörr (France) François Kirmann (Belgium) Jean Glorieux	Duqueine M30 – D08	M	92	+8 Laps
25	LMP3	4	(Luxembourg) DKR Engineering	(Germany) Laurents Hörr (France) François Kirmann (Belgium) Jean Glorieux	Nissan VK56DE 5.6 L V8	M	92	+8 Laps
26	LMGTE	77	(Germany) Proton Competition	(Italy) Michele Beretta (Belgium) Alessio Picariello (Germany) Christian Ried	Porsche 911 RSR	G	92	+8 Laps
26	LMGTE	77	(Germany) Proton Competition	(Italy) Michele Beretta (Belgium) Alessio Picariello (Germany) Christian Ried	Porsche 4.0 L Flat-6	G	92	+8 Laps
27	LMP3	15	(United Kingdom) RLR MSport	(Canada) James Dayson (Denmark) Malthe Jakobsen (United States) Robert Megennis	Ligier JS P320	M	92	+8 Laps
27	LMP3	15	(United Kingdom) RLR MSport	(Canada) James Dayson (Denmark) Malthe Jakobsen (United States) Robert Megennis	Nissan VK56DE 5.6 L V8	M	92	+8 Laps
28	LMP3	5	(France) Graff	(Switzerland) Sébastien Page (Switzerland) Luis Sanjuan (France) Eric Trouillet	Duqueine M30 – D08	M	92	+8 Laps
28	LMP3	5	(France) Graff	(Switzerland) Sébastien Page (Switzerland) Luis Sanjuan (France) Eric Trouillet	Nissan VK56DE 5.6 L V8	M	92	+8 Laps
29	LMGTE	51	(Italy) AF Corse	(Germany) Steffen Görig (Switzerland) Christoph Ulrich (Sweden) Alexander West	Ferrari 488 GTE Evo	G	92	+8 Laps
29	LMGTE	51	(Italy) AF Corse	(Germany) Steffen Görig (Switzerland) Christoph Ulrich (Sweden) Alexander West	Ferrari F154CB 3.9 L Turbo V8	G	92	+8 Laps
30	LMP3	16	(United Kingdom) BHK Motorsport	(Italy) Lorenzo Veglia (Italy) Andrea Fontana (Italy) Jacopo Baratto	Ligier JS P320	M	91	+9 Laps
30	LMP3	16	(United Kingdom) BHK Motorsport	(Italy) Lorenzo Veglia (Italy) Andrea Fontana (Italy) Jacopo Baratto	Nissan VK56DE 5.6 L V8	M	91	+9 Laps
31	LMGTE	83	(Italy) Iron Lynx	(Switzerland) Rahel Frey (Denmark) Michelle Gatting (Italy) Manuela Gostner	Ferrari 488 GTE Evo	G	91	+9 Laps
31	LMGTE	83	(Italy) Iron Lynx	(Switzerland) Rahel Frey (Denmark) Michelle Gatting (Italy) Manuela Gostner	Ferrari F154CB 3.9 L Turbo V8	G	91	+9 Laps
32	LMGTE	66	(United Kingdom) JMW Motorsport	(United Kingdom) Finlay Hutchison (United States) Gunnar Jeannette (United States) Rodrigo Sales	Ferrari 488 GTE Evo	G	88	+12 Laps
32	LMGTE	66	(United Kingdom) JMW Motorsport	(United Kingdom) Finlay Hutchison (United States) Gunnar Jeannette (United States) Rodrigo Sales	Ferrari F154CB 3.9 L Turbo V8	G	88	+12 Laps
33	LMP3	8	(Switzerland) Realteam Racing	(Switzerland) Esteban García (Switzerland) David Droux	Ligier JS P320	M	84	Mechanical
33	LMP3	8	(Switzerland) Realteam Racing	(Switzerland) Esteban García (Switzerland) David Droux	Nissan VK56DE 5.6 L V8	M	84	Mechanical
34	LMP2	26	(Russia) G-Drive Racing	(Denmark) Mikkel Jensen (Russia) Roman Rusinov	Aurus 01	M	76	Accident
34	LMP2	26	(Russia) G-Drive Racing	(Denmark) Mikkel Jensen (Russia) Roman Rusinov	Gibson GK428 4.2 L V8	M	76	Accident
35	LMP3	10	(United Kingdom) Nielsen Racing	(United States) Charles Crews (Canada) Garett Grist (United States) Rob Hodes	Duqueine M30 – D08	M	74	Mechanical
35	LMP3	10	(United Kingdom) Nielsen Racing	(United States) Charles Crews (Canada) Garett Grist (United States) Rob Hodes	Nissan VK56DE 5.6 L V8	M	74	Mechanical
36	LMGTE	54	(Italy) AF Corse	(Italy) Francesco Castellacci (Switzerland) Thomas Flohr	Ferrari 488 GTE Evo	G	54	Accident
36	LMGTE	54	(Italy) AF Corse	(Italy) Francesco Castellacci (Switzerland) Thomas Flohr	Ferrari F154CB 3.9 L Turbo V8	G	54	Accident
37	LMP2	35	(United Kingdom) BHK Motorsport	(Italy) Sergio Campana (Italy) Francesco Dracone	Oreca 07	G	52	Puncture
37	LMP2	35	(United Kingdom) BHK Motorsport	(Italy) Sergio Campana (Italy) Francesco Dracone	Gibson GK428 4.2 L V8	G	52	Puncture
38	LMGTE	60	(Italy) Iron Lynx	(Italy) Sergio Pianezzola (Italy) Claudio Schiavoni (Italy) Andrea Piccini	Ferrari 488 GTE Evo	G	17	Crash
38	LMGTE	60	(Italy) Iron Lynx	(Italy) Sergio Pianezzola (Italy) Claudio Schiavoni (Italy) Andrea Piccini	Ferrari F154CB 3.9 L Turbo V8	G	17	Crash
39	LMP3	13	(Poland) Inter Europol Competition	(Germany) Martin Hippe (United Kingdom) Nigel Moore	Ligier JS P320	M	6	Accident
39	LMP3	13	(Poland) Inter Europol Competition	(Germany) Martin Hippe (United Kingdom) Nigel Moore	Nissan VK56DE 5.6 L V8	M	6	Accident

European Le Mans Series
Previous race: 4 Hours of Le Castellet	2020 season	Next race: Le Castellet 240
