= 4 Hours of Spa-Francorchamps =

Sports car endurance race in Belgium

European Le Mans Series
- Venue: Circuit de Spa-Francorchamps
- First race: 2016
- Last race: 2024
- Duration: 4 hours
- Most wins (driver): (Portugal) Filipe Albuquerque (United Kingdom) Phil Hanson (3)
- Most wins (team): (United Kingdom) (United States) United Autosports (4)
- Most wins (manufacturer): Oreca (8)

The 4 Hours of Spa-Francorchamps is an endurance race for sports cars held at Circuit de Spa-Francorchamps in Stavelot, Wallonia, Belgium.

== History ==
The first race was announced as part of the 2016 European Le Mans Series season calendar expansion. Spa-Francorchamps was previously a joint event in the Le Mans Series and Intercontinental Le Mans Cup in 2011 but it was run as the 1000 km of Spa. The 2020 race was moved to August due to the COVID-19 pandemic.

== Results ==
Year	Overall winner(s)	Entrant	Car	Duration	Race title	Championship	Report	Ref
2016	(United Kingdom) Ben Hanley (Sweden) Henrik Hedman (France) Nicolas Lapierre	(United States) DragonSpeed	Oreca 05	4:01:13	4 Hours of Spa-Francorchamps	European Le Mans Series	report	
2017	(Australia) James Allen (United Kingdom) Richard Bradley (Colombia) Gustavo Yacamán	(France) Graff	Oreca 07	4:01:40	4 Hours of Spa-Francorchamps	European Le Mans Series	report	
2018	(Portugal) Filipe Albuquerque (United Kingdom) Phil Hanson	(United States) United Autosports	Ligier JS P217	2:01:20 (Note: The race was red flagged with two hours remaining due to heavy rain.)	4 Hours of Spa-Francorchamps	European Le Mans Series	report	
2019	(Portugal) Filipe Albuquerque (United Kingdom) Phil Hanson	(United States) United Autosports	Oreca 07	4:00:43	4 Hours of Spa-Francorchamps	European Le Mans Series	report	
2020	(Portugal) Filipe Albuquerque (United Kingdom) Phil Hanson	(United States) United Autosports	Oreca 07	4:02:01	4 Hours of Spa-Francorchamps	European Le Mans Series	report	
2021	(Switzerland) Louis Delétraz (Poland) Robert Kubica (China) Yifei Ye	(Belgium) Team WRT	Oreca 07	4:01:14	4 Hours of Spa-Francorchamps	European Le Mans Series	report	
2022	(United Kingdom) Philip Hanson (United Kingdom) Tom Gamble (United Kingdom) Duncan Tappy	(United Kingdom) United Autosports	Oreca 07	4:00:31	4 Hours of Spa-Francorchamps	European Le Mans Series	report	
2023	(Barbados) Kyffin Simpson (Australia) James Allen (United Kingdom) Alexander Lynn	(Portugal) Algarve Pro Racing	Oreca 07	4:00:13	4 Hours of Spa-Francorchamps	European Le Mans Series	report	
2024	(United Kingdom) Jonny Edgar (Switzerland) Louis Delétraz (Poland) Robert Kubica	(United States) AO by TF	Oreca 07	4:01:28	4 Hours of Spa-Francorchamps	European Le Mans Series	report	
2025	(United Kingdom) Oliver Gray (France) Esteban Masson (France) Charles Milesi	(France) VDS Panis Racing	Oreca 07	4:00:03	4 Hours of Spa-Francorchamps	European Le Mans Series	report	

=== Records ===
==== Wins by constructor ====
Rank	Constructor	Wins	Years
1	(France) Oreca	9	2016–2017, 2019–2025
2	(France) Ligier	1	2018

==== Wins by engine manufacturer ====
Rank	Constructor	Wins	Years
1	(United Kingdom) Gibson	9	2017–2025
2	(Japan) Nissan	1	2016

==== Drivers with multiple wins ====
Rank	Driver	Wins	Years
1	(Portugal) Filipe Albuquerque	3	2018–2020
1	(United Kingdom) Phil Hanson	3	2018–2020
3	(Australia) James Allen	2	2017, 2023
3	(Switzerland) Louis Delétraz	2	2021, 2024
3	(Poland) Robert Kubica	2	2021, 2024
