= 2007 Ginetta Junior Championship =

Seasons
- ← 2006 2008 →

The 2007 Ginetta GT Junior Championship season was the third season of the Ginetta Junior Championship. The season began at Anglesey on 30 June 2007 and concluded after 16 races over 7 events at Brands Hatch on 27 October 2007.

== Teams and drivers ==
- All teams and drivers were British-registered. All drivers raced in Ginetta G20 GT4 Coupés.

Team	No.	Drivers	Rounds
All Secure Storage	3	Michael Rich	2
Hepworth International	4	Paul Marsh	All
Hepworth International	5	Jordan Lennox-Lamb	1, 6–7
Hepworth International	5	Ryan Hepworth	5
Hepworth International	6	Thomas Carnaby	All
Hepworth International	25	Nigel Moore	All
Tockwith Motorsport	3	Chris Smiley	6–7
Tockwith Motorsport	5	Samantha Thom	2
Tockwith Motorsport	15	Alice Powell	3–7
Tockwith Motorsport	26	Sarah Moore	7
Waterfall Racing	7	Nick Ponting	All
Nexa Racing	8	James Jefferson	All
IDL Racing	10	Tom Sharp	All
Optimum Motorsport	13	Cavan Corcoran	3–6
HG Motorsport	19	Ashley Bird	All
Optimum Motorsport/TT Race Engineering	20	Kieran Vernon	All
Privateer	24	Simon Austin	2–7
Morgans Office Furniture	27	Mia Morgan	2–7
TollBar Racing	28	George Richardson	All
Racing Services	34	Christopher Clayton	All
Racing Services	44	Mikey Crabtree	4–6
Privateer	45	Jake Rattenbury	5–7
Speed Merchants	50	Joseph Shaw	All
Muzz Race	55	Dino Zamparelli	4–7
Dominant Motor Sport	66	Dominic Pettit	All
KCW Motorsport	72	Cassey Watson	1–3
Privateer	72	Ashley Craig	5–7
Walkinshaw Performance	91	Fergus Walkinshaw	All

== Race calendar and results ==
Round		Circuit	Date	Pole position	Fastest lap	Winning driver	Winning team
1	R1	Anglesey, Wales	30 June	Dominic Pettit	Dominic Pettit	Nigel Moore	Hepworth International
1	R2	Anglesey, Wales	1 July	Nigel Moore	Nigel Moore	Nigel Moore	Hepworth International
2	R3	Silverstone (National), Northamptonshire	22 July	Nick Ponting	Nigel Moore	Nigel Moore	Hepworth International
2	R4	Silverstone (National), Northamptonshire	22 July	Dominic Pettit	James Jefferson	Nigel Moore	Hepworth International
3	R5	Donington Park (National), Leicestershire	5 August	Kieran Vernon	Christopher Clayton	Dominic Pettit	Dominant Motor Sport
3	R6	Donington Park (National), Leicestershire	5 August	James Jefferson	James Jefferson	James Jefferson	Nexa Racing
4	R7	Croft Circuit, North Yorkshire	25 August	Nigel Moore	Nigel Moore	Nigel Moore	Hepworth International
4	R8	Croft Circuit, North Yorkshire	26 August	Nigel Moore	James Jefferson	Christopher Clayton	Racing Services
5	R9	Pembrey, Wales	23 September	Kieran Vernon	Kieran Vernon	Nigel Moore	Hepworth International
5	R10	Pembrey, Wales	23 September	Kieran Vernon	Nigel Moore	Nigel Moore	Hepworth International
6	R11	Brands Hatch (Indy), Kent	6 October	Kieran Vernon	Race cancelled		
6	R12	Brands Hatch (Indy), Kent	7 October	Kieran Vernon	George Richardson	Kieran Vernon	Optimum Motorsport/TT Race Engineering
6	R13	Brands Hatch (Indy), Kent	7 October	Kieran Vernon	Kieran Vernon	Kieran Vernon	Optimum Motorsport/TT Race Engineering
7	R14	Brands Hatch (Indy), Kent	27 October	Nigel Moore	Kieran Vernon	James Jefferson	Nexa Racing
7	R15	Brands Hatch (Indy), Kent	27 October	Kieran Vernon	Nigel Moore	Kieran Vernon	Optimum Motorsport/TT Race Engineering
7	R16	Brands Hatch (Indy), Kent	27 October	Kieran Vernon	James Jefferson	Nigel Moore	Hepworth International

== Drivers' Championship ==
Pos	Driver	ANG		SIL		DON		CRO		PEM		BRH			BRH			Pts
1	Nigel Moore	1	1	1	1	4	11	1	15	1	1	C	3	3	2	2	1	385
2	Kieran Vernon	5	5	3	Ret	7	2	14	7	2	Ret	C	1	1	3	1	2	294
3	Tom Sharp	6	3	4	5	6	3	4	Ret	4	2	C	6	6	6	7	4	268
4	Christopher Clayton	2	9	5	4	10	4	3	1	3	10	C	8	7	4	11	15	251
5	Dominic Pettit	4	2	9	Ret	1	15	16	Ret	8	3	C	4	5	DNS	4	5	208
6	Nick Ponting	Ret	12	8	3	3	8	7	11	7	4	C	7	8	11	3	7	205
7	George Richardson	13	11	12	6	5	5	11	2	9	8	C	2	4	DNS	DNS	12	185
8	James Jefferson	9	6	2	Ret	2	1	2	4	DSQ	DSQ	C	12	2	1	8	3	177
9	Paul Marsh	Ret	8	6	2	9	6	17	3	10	DNS	C	DNS	DNS	9	9	10	146
10	Fergus Walkinshaw	8	4	7	7	17	9	5	5	5	16	C	14	Ret	Ret	14	16	143
11	Thomas Carnaby	10	10	10	8	14	14	Ret	6	6	Ret	C	9	18	7	DNS	8	121
12	Ashley Bird	7	7	11	11	8	10	8	9	12	9	C	10	11	DNS	DNS	21	121
13	Dino Zamparelli							10	8	13	6	C	5	Ret	5	6	6	115
14	Joseph Shaw	12	14	16	13	15	Ret	13	14	11	5	C	11	9	10	10	9	113
15	Simon Austin			13	10	12	7	6	13	18	11	C	15	10	8	13	11	111
16	Alice Powell					16	12	12	10	15	12	C	16	12	Ret	12	14	62
17	Cassey Watson	3	13	14	9	11	DNS											51
18	Jordon Lennox-Lamb	11	15									C	13	13	DNS	5	13	51
19	Cavan Corcoran					13	13	9	12	14	7	C	DNS	DNS				47
20	Ashley Craig									16	13	C	19	14	13	17	19	26
21	Chris Smiley											C	18	15	12	15	17	23
22	Jake Rattenbury									19	14	C	20	17	14	18	DNS	16
23	Mia Morgan			18	Ret	18	16	DNS	16	DNS	DNS	C	NC	19	16	DNS	20	13
24	Samantha Thom			15	12													11
25	Mikey Crabtree							15	Ret	DNS	DNS	C	17	16				11
26	Sarah Moore														15	16	18	11
27	Michael Rich			17	14													7
28	Ryan Hepworth									17	15							5
Pos	Driver	ANG		SIL		DON		CRO		PEM		BRH			BRH			Pts

Colour	Result
Gold	Winner
Silver	Second place
Bronze	Third place
Green	Points classification
Blue	Non-points classification
Blue	Non-classified finish (NC)
Purple	Retired, not classified (Ret)
Red	Did not qualify (DNQ)
Red	Did not pre-qualify (DNPQ)
Black	Disqualified (DSQ)
White	Did not start (DNS)
White	Withdrew (WD)
White	Race cancelled (C)
Blank	Did not practice (DNP)
Blank	Did not arrive (DNA)
Blank	Excluded (EX)
