= 2016 Britcar Endurance Championship =

Seasons
- ← 2015 2017 →

The 2016 Dunlop Endurance Championship is a motor racing championship for GT cars, touring cars, sportscars and Production cars held across England. Cars compete in five classes with a car's class decided on horsepower, momentum, equipment, etc. It is the 14th season of a Britcar championship, the 5th run as the Britcar Endurance Championship and the 1st run as the Dunlop Britcar Endurance Championship. The championship began on 26 March at Silverstone and ended on 13 November at Brands Hatch.

== Calendar ==
The 2016 calendar was announced on 5 January 2016. Each race would consist of one mandatory pit stop and a driver change.

Round	Circuit	Length	Date
1	Silverstone GP, Northamptonshire	120 min	26 March
2	Snetterton 300, Norfolk	240 min	8 May
3	Donington GP, Leicestershire	180 min	4 June
4	Thruxton Circuit, Hampshire	120 min	3 July
5	Croft Circuit, North Yorkshire	180 min	23 July
6	Silverstone International, Northamptonshire	150 min	13 August
7	Oulton Park International, Cheshire	150 min	1 October
8	Brands Hatch Indy Circuit, Kent	180 min	12-13 November

== Teams and drivers ==
Cars are assigned classed based on speed, horsepower, momentum, equipment fitted to the car and the car's model;
Class 1: GT3, prototype cars
Class 2: Cup (one-make series) cars
Class 3: Cup (one-make series) and GT4 cars
Class 4: GT4, cup and touring cars
Class 5: Production cars

Class 1
Team	Car	No.	Drivers	Rounds
FF Corse	Ferrari 458 GT3	1	(United Kingdom) Calum Lockie	1, 3–8
FF Corse	Ferrari 458 GT3	1	(United Kingdom) David Mason	1, 3–8
Neil Garner Motorsport (Note: The No. 3 car ran under Neil Garner Motorsport and the No. 7 ran under Holden Autosport / Neil Garner Motorsport.)	Mosler MT900R GT3	3	(Spain) Manuel Cintrano	1–2, 4–5, 8
Neil Garner Motorsport	Mosler MT900R GT3	3	(Spain) Javier Morcillo	1–2, 4–5, 8
Neil Garner Motorsport	Praga R4S LM (Note: The practice and qualifying times for round one list the No. 7 car as a Praga R4S, as Neil Garner Motorsport does own one.)	7	(United Kingdom) Nick Holden	1
Neil Garner Motorsport	Praga R4S LM	7	(United Kingdom) Andrew McKenna	1
Neil Garner Motorsport	Renault R.S. 01 GT3	7	(United Kingdom) Nick Holden	1–3
Neil Garner Motorsport	Renault R.S. 01 GT3	7	(United Kingdom) Andrew McKenna	1–3
MacG Racing	Taranis	8	(United Kingdom) Jonny MacGregor	1, 4, 6
MacG Racing	Taranis	8	(United Kingdom) Ben Sharich	6
HUD Motorsport	Audi R8 LMS	12	(United Kingdom) Nigel Hudson	1
HUD Motorsport	Audi R8 LMS	12	(United Kingdom) Adam Wilcox	1
Wessex Vehicles	Lamborghini Gallardo GT3	15	(United Kingdom) Craig Dolby	4
Wessex Vehicles	Lamborghini Gallardo GT3	15	(United Kingdom) Nigel Mustill	4
Carnell Nielsen Racing	Lamborghini Huracán GT3	18	(United Kingdom) Nigel Greensall	1
Carnell Nielsen Racing	Lamborghini Huracán GT3	18	(United Kingdom) Darren Nelson	1
Tockwith Motorsport	Audi R8 LMS	19	(United Kingdom) Phil Hanson	All
Tockwith Motorsport	Audi R8 LMS	19	(United Kingdom) Nigel Moore	All
ING Sport	BMW Z4 GT3	46	(United Kingdom) Kevin Clarke	1, 3, 5, 7–8
ING Sport	BMW Z4 GT3	46	(United Kingdom) Ian Lawson	1, 3, 5, 7–8
ING Sport	BMW Z4 GT3	46	(United Kingdom) Ryan Lyndsay	3
ABG Motorsport	McLaren MP4-12C GT3	77	(United Kingdom) Glynn Geddie	1
ABG Motorsport	McLaren MP4-12C GT3	77	(United Kingdom) Jim Geddie	1
Rollcentre Racing	Mosler MT900R GT3	888	(United Kingdom) Richard Neary	7
Rollcentre Racing	Mosler MT900R GT3	888	(United Kingdom) Martin Short	7
Class 2
Team	Car	No.	Drivers	Rounds
FF Corse	Ferrari 458 Challenge	4	(United Kingdom) Leyton Clarke	6
FF Corse	Ferrari 458 Challenge	4	(United Kingdom) Simon Atkinson	6
FF Corse	Ferrari 458 Challenge	5	(United Kingdom) Bonamy Grimes	1–2, 6, 8
FF Corse	Ferrari 458 Challenge	5	(United Kingdom) Johnny Mowlem	1–2, 8
FF Corse	Ferrari 458 Challenge	5	(United Kingdom) Charlie Hollings	6
FF Corse	Ferrari 458 Challenge	9	(United Kingdom) Anthony Wilds	2–4, 6
FF Corse	Ferrari 458 Challenge	9	(United Kingdom) Mike Wilds	2–4, 6
FF Corse	Ferrari 458 Challenge	44	(United Kingdom) Leyton Clarke	3
FF Corse	Ferrari 458 Challenge	44	(United Kingdom) Simon Atkinson	3
Moss Motorsport	BMW 1M E82	13	(United Kingdom) Ashley Bird	5
Moss Motorsport	BMW 1M E82	13	(United Kingdom) Tom Howard	5
Moss Motorsport	BMW 1M E82	13	(United Kingdom) Mike Moss	5
SG Racing	Porsche 997 Cup	32	(United Kingdom) Mark Cunningham	6–7
SG Racing	Porsche 997 Cup	32	(United Kingdom) Peter Cunningham	6–7
Porscheshop	Porsche 911 RSR	34	(United Kingdom) Ian Heward	1–3
Porscheshop	Porsche 911 RSR	34	(United Kingdom) Darelle Wilson	1–3
WDC Racing	Ferrari 360 Challenge	71	(United Kingdom) Neil Garnham	1
WDC Racing	Ferrari 360 Challenge	71	(United Kingdom) Rob Young	1
Class 2 Invitation
Team	Car	No.	Drivers	Rounds
WDC Racing	Ferrari 458 Challenge	71	(United Kingdom) Matt Le Breton	8
WDC Racing	Ferrari 458 Challenge	71	(United Kingdom) Neil Garnham	8
WDC Racing	Ferrari 458 Challenge	71	(United Kingdom) Rob Young	8
Class 3
Team	Car	No.	Drivers	Rounds
WDC Racing	BMW M3 GT4	7	(United Kingdom) Matt Le Breton	6
WDC Racing	BMW M3 GT4	7	(United Kingdom) Neil Garnham	6
WDC Racing	BMW M3 GT4	7	(United Kingdom) Rob Young	6
Track Torque Racing	Chevron GR8	17	(United Kingdom) Chris Hart	1
Track Torque Racing	Chevron GR8	17	(United Kingdom) Neil Primrose	1
Track Torque Racing	Chevron GR8	17	(United Kingdom) Jono Brown	3
Track Torque Racing	Chevron GR8	17	(United Kingdom) Graham Roberts	3
SG Racing	Porsche 997 Cup	32	(United Kingdom) Mark Cunningham	1–2
SG Racing	Porsche 997 Cup	32	(United Kingdom) Peter Cunningham	1–2
Century Motorsport	Ginetta G55 Supercup	43	(United Kingdom) Steve Fresle	All
Century Motorsport	Ginetta G55 Supercup	43	(Denmark) Jacob Mathiassen	All
Century Motorsport	Ginetta G55 Supercup	88	(Russia) Ruben Anakhasyan	1–2
Century Motorsport	Ginetta G55 Supercup	88	(United Kingdom) Ollie Hancock	1–2
Whitebridge Motorsport	Aston Martin Vantage GT4	54	(United Kingdom) Chris Murphy	All
Whitebridge Motorsport	Aston Martin Vantage GT4	54	(United Kingdom) Jody Fannin	1–3
Whitebridge Motorsport	Aston Martin Vantage GT4	54	(United Kingdom) Jonny Cocker	4–7
Whitebridge Motorsport	Aston Martin Vantage GT4	54	(United Kingdom) Matty George	8
Moss Motorsport	BMW M3 E46	57	(United Kingdom) Frank Bradley	1
Moss Motorsport	BMW M3 E46	57	(United Kingdom) Tom Howard	1
Hofmann's Henley Ltd	Lotus Europa	58	(United Kingdom) Chris Randall (Note: Chris Randall is also known as Fabio Randaccio.)	1–4, 6–7
Hofmann's Henley Ltd	Lotus Europa	58	(United Kingdom) Nick Randall	1–4, 7
Hofmann's Henley Ltd	Lotus Europa	58	(United Kingdom) Ben Salmon	6
Bespoke Cars Racing	Porsche 997 Cup	69	(New Zealand) Dave Benett	1, 5–6
Bespoke Cars Racing	Porsche 997 Cup	69	(United Kingdom) Marcus Fothergill	1, 5–6
Bespoke Cars Racing	Porsche 997 Cup	69	(United Kingdom) Adam Dawson	5–6
Going Lean	Aston Martin Vantage GT4	76	(United Kingdom) Dean Gibbs	8
Going Lean	Aston Martin Vantage GT4	76	(United Kingdom) Jonathan Packer	8
Vantage Racing	Aston Martin Vantage GT4	91	(United Kingdom) Stuart Hall	2
Vantage Racing	Aston Martin Vantage GT4	91	(United Kingdom) Chris Kemp	2
Class 3 Invitation
Team	Car	No.	Drivers	Rounds
Team HARD Racing	Ginetta G55 GT4	21	(United Kingdom) Dan Kirby	8
Team HARD Racing	Ginetta G55 GT4	21	(United Kingdom) Tom Knight	8
Team HARD Racing	Ginetta G55 GT4	34	(United Kingdom) Darron Lewis	8
Team HARD Racing	Ginetta G55 GT4	34	(United Kingdom) Daniel Wylie	8
Orbital Sound	Lotus Exige	55	(United Kingdom) Chris Headlam	7
Orbital Sound	Lotus Exige	55	(United Kingdom) Joey Foster	7
Class 4
Team	Car	No.	Drivers	Rounds
Geoff Steel Racing	BMW M3 E36	13	(United Kingdom) Del Shelton	1
Cuda Drinks	Ginetta G50	14	(United Kingdom) Richard Burrows	3
Cuda Drinks	Ginetta G50	14	(United Kingdom) Glenn Finn	3
Atkins Motorsport With Snows BM	BMW M3 E46 GTR	38	(United Kingdom) Sam Allpass	1, 4, 7
Atkins Motorsport With Snows BM	BMW M3 E46 GTR	38	(United Kingdom) Lee Atkins	1, 4, 7
Moss Motorsport	BMW M3 E46	57	(United Kingdom) Mike Moss	2–3, 6
Moss Motorsport	BMW M3 E46	57	(United Kingdom) Tom Howard	2–3
Moss Motorsport	BMW M3 E46	57	(United Kingdom) David Cooper	5–6
Moss Motorsport	BMW M3 E46	57	(United Kingdom) Jason Dixon	5
Moss Motorsport	BMW M3 E46	57	(United Kingdom) Robert Gilham	5
Moss Motorsport	BMW M3 E46	57	(United Kingdom) Ashley Bird	6
Moss Motorsport	BMW M3 E46	57	(United Kingdom) Scott Adam	8
Moss Motorsport	BMW M3 E46	57	(United Kingdom) Shaun Hollamby	8
Moss Motorsport	BMW M3 E46	57	(United Kingdom) Andy Wilmott	8
SICL.com	SEAT León Supercopa	60	(United Kingdom) Keith Hemsworth	1
SICL.com	SEAT León Supercopa	60	(United Kingdom) Ash Woodman	1
Class 5
Team	Car	No.	Drivers	Rounds
Cuda Drinks	Ginetta G40 GT5	14	(United Kingdom) Richard Burrows	3
Cuda Drinks	Ginetta G40 GT5	14	(United Kingdom) Glenn Finn	3
Newbridge Motorsport	Porsche Boxster	24	(Canada) Fareed Ali	3
Newbridge Motorsport	Porsche Boxster	24	(United Kingdom) Chris Valentine	3
Woodard Racing Organisation	BMW Mini JCW Challenge R56	49	(United Kingdom) Adam Bewsey	1
Woodard Racing Organisation	BMW Mini JCW Challenge R56	49	(United Kingdom) Alex Craven	1
Woodard Racing Organisation	BMW Mini JCW Challenge R56	49	(United Kingdom) Daniel Woodard	2–3, 7–8
Woodard Racing Organisation	BMW Mini JCW Challenge R56	49	(United Kingdom) David Birrell	2, 7–8
Woodard Racing Organisation	BMW Mini JCW Challenge R56	49	(United Kingdom) Aaron Steele	3
Synchro Motorsport	Honda Civic Type R	76	(Wales) Alyn James	1–7
Synchro Motorsport	Honda Civic Type R	76	(United Kingdom) Martin Byford	2, 6–7
Synchro Motorsport	Honda Civic Type R	76	(United Kingdom) Daniel Wheeler	3, 5

== Results ==
Round	Circuit	Pole position	Fastest lap	Overall winner	Winning C1	Winning C2	Winning C3	Winning C4	Winning C5
1	Silverstone GP	No. 1 FF Corse	No. 19 Tockwith Motorsport	No. 19 Tockwith Motorsport	No. 19 Tockwith Motorsport	No. 34 Porscheshop	No. 43 Century Motorsport	No. 38 Atkins Motorsport With Snows BM	No. 76 Synchro Motorsport
1	Silverstone GP	(United Kingdom) Calum Lockie (United Kingdom) David Mason	(United Kingdom) Phil Hanson (United Kingdom) Nigel Moore	(United Kingdom) Phil Hanson (United Kingdom) Nigel Moore	(United Kingdom) Phil Hanson (United Kingdom) Nigel Moore	(United Kingdom) Ian Heward (United Kingdom) Darelle Wilson	(United Kingdom) Steve Fresle (Denmark) Jacob Mathiassen	(United Kingdom) Sam Allpass (United Kingdom) Lee Atkins	(Wales) Alyn James
2	Snetterton 300	No. 3 Neil Garner Motorsport	No. 19 Tockwith Motorsport	No. 9 FF Corse	No. 7 Holden Autosport	No. 9 FF Corse	No. 88 Century Motorsport	No. 57 Moss Motorsport	No. 76 Synchro Motorsport
2	Snetterton 300	(Spain) Manuel Cintrano (Spain) Javier Morcillo	(United Kingdom) Phil Hanson (United Kingdom) Nigel Moore	(United Kingdom) Anthony Wilds (United Kingdom) Mike Wilds	(United Kingdom) Nick Holden (United Kingdom) Andrew McKenna	(United Kingdom) Anthony Wilds (United Kingdom) Mike Wilds	(Russia) Ruben Anakhasyan (United Kingdom) Ollie Hancock	(United Kingdom) Tom Howard (United Kingdom) Mike Moss	(United Kingdom) Martin Byford (Wales) Alyn James
3	Donington GP	No. 19 Tockwith Motorsport	No. 19 Tockwith Motorsport	No. 19 Tockwith Motorsport	No. 19 Tockwith Motorsport	No. 44 FF Corse	No. 43 Century Motorsport	No. 57 Moss Motorsport	No. 76 Synchro Motorsport
3	Donington GP	(United Kingdom) Phil Hanson (United Kingdom) Nigel Moore	(United Kingdom) Phil Hanson (United Kingdom) Nigel Moore	(United Kingdom) Phil Hanson (United Kingdom) Nigel Moore	(United Kingdom) Phil Hanson (United Kingdom) Nigel Moore	(United Kingdom) Simon Atkinson (United Kingdom) Leyton Clarke	(United Kingdom) Steve Fresle (Denmark) Jacob Mathiassen	(United Kingdom) Tom Howard (United Kingdom) Mike Moss	(Wales) Alyn James (United Kingdom) Daniel Wheeler
4	Thruxton Circuit	No. 15 Wessex Vehicles	No. 15 Wessex Vehicles	No. 19 Tockwith Motorsport	No. 19 Tockwith Motorsport	No. 9 FF Corse	No. 43 Century Motorsport	No. 38 Atkins Motorsport With Snows BM	No. 76 Synchro Motorsport
4	Thruxton Circuit	(United Kingdom) Craig Dolby (United Kingdom) Nigel Mustill	(United Kingdom) Craig Dolby (United Kingdom) Nigel Mustill	(United Kingdom) Phil Hanson (United Kingdom) Nigel Moore	(United Kingdom) Phil Hanson (United Kingdom) Nigel Moore	(United Kingdom) Anthony Wilds (United Kingdom) Mike Wilds	(United Kingdom) Steve Fresle (Denmark) Jacob Mathiassen	(United Kingdom) Sam Allpass (United Kingdom) Lee Atkins	(Wales) Alyn James
5	Croft Circuit	No. 19 Tockwith Motorsport	No. 19 Tockwith Motorsport	No. 19 Tockwith Motorsport	No. 19 Tockwith Motorsport	No. 13 Moss Motorsport	No. 54 Whitebridge Motorsport	No. 57 Moss Motorsport	No. 76 Synchro Motorsport
5	Croft Circuit	(United Kingdom) Phil Hanson (United Kingdom) Nigel Moore	(United Kingdom) Phil Hanson (United Kingdom) Nigel Moore	(United Kingdom) Phil Hanson (United Kingdom) Nigel Moore	(United Kingdom) Phil Hanson (United Kingdom) Nigel Moore	(United Kingdom) Ashley Bird (United Kingdom) Tom Howard (United Kingdom) Mike Moss	(United Kingdom) Jonny Cocker (United Kingdom) Chris Murphy	(United Kingdom) David Cooper (United Kingdom) Jason Dixon (United Kingdom) Robert Gilham	(Wales) Alyn James (United Kingdom) Daniel Wheeler
6	Silverstone International	No. 1 FF Corse	No. 1 FF Corse	No. 19 Tockwith Motorsport	No. 19 Tockwith Motorsport	No. 9 FF Corse	No. 69 Bespoke Cars Racing	No. 57 Moss Motorsport	No. 76 Synchro Motorsport
6	Silverstone International	(United Kingdom) Calum Lockie (United Kingdom) David Mason	(United Kingdom) Calum Lockie (United Kingdom) David Mason	(United Kingdom) Phil Hanson (United Kingdom) Nigel Moore	(United Kingdom) Phil Hanson (United Kingdom) Nigel Moore	(United Kingdom) Anthony Wilds (United Kingdom) Mike Wilds	(New Zealand) Dave Benett (United Kingdom) Adam Dawson (United Kingdom) Marcus Fothergill	(United Kingdom) Ashley Bird (United Kingdom) David Cooper (United Kingdom) Mike Moss	(United Kingdom) Martin Byford (Wales) Alyn James
7	Oulton Park International	No. 1 FF Corse	No. 1 FF Corse	No. 888 Rollcentre Racing	No. 888 Rollcentre Racing	No. 32 SG Racing	No. 43 Century Motorsport	No. 38 Atkins Motorsport With Snows BM	No. 76 Synchro Motorsport
7	Oulton Park International	(United Kingdom) Calum Lockie (United Kingdom) David Mason	(United Kingdom) Calum Lockie (United Kingdom) David Mason	(United Kingdom) Richard Neary (United Kingdom) Martin Short	(United Kingdom) Richard Neary (United Kingdom) Martin Short	(United Kingdom) Mark Cunningham (United Kingdom) Peter Cunningham	(United Kingdom) Steve Fresle (Denmark) Jacob Mathiassen	(United Kingdom) Sam Allpass (United Kingdom) Lee Atkins	(United Kingdom) Martin Byford (Wales) Alyn James
8	Brands Hatch Indy	No. 19 Tockwith Motorsport	No. 19 Tockwith Motorsport	No. 3 Neil Garner Motorsport	No. 3 Neil Garner Motorsport	No. 5 FF Corse	No. 34 Team HARD Racing	No. 57 Moss Motorsport	No. 49 Woodard Racing Organisation
8	Brands Hatch Indy	(United Kingdom) Phil Hanson (United Kingdom) Nigel Moore	(United Kingdom) Phil Hanson (United Kingdom) Nigel Moore	(Spain) Manuel Cintrano (Spain) Javier Morcillo	(Spain) Manuel Cintrano (Spain) Javier Morcillo	(United Kingdom) Bonamy Grimes (United Kingdom) Johnny Mowlem	(United Kingdom) Darron Lews (United Kingdom) Daniel Wylie	(United Kingdom) Scott Adam (United Kingdom) Shaun Hollamby (United Kingdom) Andy Wilmott	(United Kingdom) David Birrell (United Kingdom) Daniel Woodard

=== Overall championship standings ===
Points are awarded as follows in all classes

System	1st	2nd	3rd	4th	5th	6th	7th	8th	9th	10th	11th	12th	13th	14th	15th	PP	FL
+3	25	20	17	14	12	10	9	8	7	6	5	4	3	2	1	1	1

(key)

Pos.	Drivers	No.	Class	SILGP	SNE	DON	THR	CRO	SILINT	OUL	BRH	Pts
1	(United Kingdom) Phil Hanson (United Kingdom) Nigel Moore	19	1	1	12	**1**	1	**1**	1	11	**2**	170
2	(United Kingdom) Steve Fresle (Denmark) Jacob Mathiassen	43	3	6	5	5	4	4	NC	5	8	170
3	(United Kingdom) Chris Murphy	54	3	10	6	7	5	6	7	8	11	145
3	(United Kingdom) Jody Fannin	54	3	10	6	7						145
3	(United Kingdom) Jonny Cocker	54	3				5	6	7	8		145
3	(United Kingdom) Matty George	54	3								11	145
4	(Wales) Alyn James	76	5	15	7	9	9	8	12	7		116
4	(United Kingdom) Martin Byford	76	5		7				12	7		116
4	(United Kingdom) Daniel Wheeler	76	5			9		8				116
5	(United Kingdom) Calum Lockie (United Kingdom) David Mason	1	1	**Ret**		15	6	3	**4**	**2**	5	107
6	(United Kingdom) Frank Bradley (United Kingdom) Tom Howard	57	3	13								93
6	(United Kingdom) Tom Howard	57	4		14	8						93
6	(United Kingdom) Mike Moss	57	4		14	8			8			93
6	(United Kingdom) David Cooper	57	4					6	8			93
6	(United Kingdom) Jason Dixon (United Kingdom) Robert Gillham	57	4					6				93
6	(United Kingdom) Ashley Bird	57	4						8			93
6	(United Kingdom) Scott Adam (United Kingdom) Shaun Hollamby (United Kingdom) Andy Wilmott	57	4								6	93
7	(Spain) Manuel Cintrano (Spain) Javier Morcillo	3	1	3	**3**		8	9			1	91
8	(United Kingdom) Anthony Wilds (United Kingdom) Mike Wilds	9	2		1	3	3		2			85
9	(United Kingdom) Kevin Clarke (United Kingdom) Ian Lawson	46	1	5		6		2		3	3	82
9	(United Kingdom) Ryan Lyndsay	46	1			6						82
10	(United Kingdom) Chris Randall	58	3	8	13	14	11		10	12		74
10	(United Kingdom) Nick Randall	58	3	8	13	14	11			12		74
10	(United Kingdom) Ben Salmon	58	3						10			74
11	(United Kingdom) Adam Bewsey (United Kingdom) Alex Craven	49	5	22								63
11	(United Kingdom) Daniel Woodard	49	5		9	12				10	12	63
11	(United Kingdom) David Birrell	49	5		9					10	12	63
11	(United Kingdom) Aaron Steele	49	5			12						63
12	(United Kingdom) Ian Heward (United Kingdom) Darelle Wilson	34	2	17	11	10						60
13	(United Kingdom) Bonamy Grimes	5	2	Ret	9				5		4	56
13	(United Kingdom) Johnny Mowlem	5	2	Ret	9						4	56
13	(United Kingdom) Charlie Hollings	5	2						5			56
14	(United Kingdom) Nick Holden (United Kingdom) Andrew McKenna	7	1	20	2	4						55
15	(New Zealand) Dave Benett (United Kingdom) Marcus Fothergill	69	3	15				5	6			55
15	(United Kingdom) Adam Dawson	69	3					5	6			55
16	(United Kingdom) Sam Allpass (United Kingdom) Lee Atkins	38	4	11			5			9		55
17	(United Kingdom) Mark Cunningham (United Kingdom) Peter Cunningham	32	3	7	10							52
17	(United Kingdom) Mark Cunningham (United Kingdom) Peter Cunningham	32	2						NC	4		52
18	(United Kingdom) Simon Atkinson (United Kingdom) Leyton Clarke	44	2			2						47
18	(United Kingdom) Simon Atkinson (United Kingdom) Leyton Clarke	4	2						3			47
19	(United Kingdom) Jonny MacGregor	8	1	23			10		11			37
19	(United Kingdom) Ben Sharich	8	1						11			37
20	(Russia) Ruben Anakhasyan (United Kingdom) Ollie Hancock	88	3	16	4							34
21	(United Kingdom) Chris Hart (United Kingdom) Neil Primrose	17	3	9								31
21	(United Kingdom) Jono Brown (United Kingdom) Graham Roberts	17	3			13						31
22	(United Kingdom) Richard Neary (United Kingdom) Martin Short	888	1							1		25
23	(United Kingdom) Craig Dolby (United Kingdom) Nigel Mustill	15	1				**2**					22
24	(United Kingdom) Neil Garnham (United Kingdom) Rob Young	71	2	21								20
25	(United Kingdom) Del Shelton	13	4	12								20
26	(United Kingdom) Nigel Greensall (United Kingdom) Darren Nelson	18	1	2								20
27	(United Kingdom) Ashley Bird (United Kingdom) Tom Howard (United Kingdom) Mike Moss	13	2					10				20
28	(United Kingdom) Richard Burrows (United Kingdom) Glenn Finn	14	5	19								20
29	(United Kingdom) Neil Garnham (United Kingdom) Matt Le Breton (United Kingdom) Rob Young	7	3						9			17
30	(United Kingdom) Ash Woodman (United Kingdom) Keith Hemsworth	60	4	18								15
31	(United Kingdom) Nigel Hudson (United Kingdom) Adam Wilcox	12	1	4								14
32	(United Kingdom) Richard Burrows (United Kingdom) Glenn Finn	14	4			11						10
33	(United Kingdom) Stuart Hall (United Kingdom) Chris Kemp	91	3		15							10
–	(United Kingdom) Glynn Geddie (United Kingdom) Jim Geddie	77	1	Ret								0
–	(Canada) Fareed Ali (United Kingdom) Chris Valentine	24	5			DNS						0
–	(United Kingdom) Dean Gibbs (United Kingdom) Jonathan Packer	76	3								DNS	0
drivers ineligible for points
–	(United Kingdom) Chris Headlam (United Kingdom) Joey Foster	55	3Inv							6		0
–	(United Kingdom) Darron Lewis (United Kingdom) Daniel Wylie	34	3Inv								7	0
–	(United Kingdom) Dan Kirby (United Kingdom) Tom Knight	21	3Inv								9	0
–	(United Kingdom) Neil Garnham (United Kingdom) Matt Le Breton (United Kingdom) Rob Young	71	2Inv								10	0
Pos.	Drivers	No.	Class	SILGP	SNE	DON	THR	CRO	SILINT	OUL	BRH	Pts

Key
Colour	Result
Gold	Winner
Silver	Second place
Bronze	Third place
Green	Other points position
Blue	Other classified position
Blue	Not classified, finished (NC)
Purple	Not classified, retired (Ret)
Red	Did not qualify (DNQ)
Red	Did not pre-qualify (DNPQ)
Black	Disqualified (DSQ)
White	Did not start (DNS)
White	Race cancelled (C)
Blank	Did not practice (DNP)
Blank	Excluded (EX)
Blank	Did not arrive (DNA)
Blank	Withdrawn (WD)
Blank	Did not enter (cell empty)
Text formatting	Meaning
**Bold**	Pole position
Italics	Fastest lap

=== Class championship standings ===
Points are awarded as follows in all classes

System	1st	2nd	3rd	4th	5th	6th	7th	8th	9th	10th	11th	12th	13th	14th	15th	PP	FL
+3	25	20	17	14	12	10	9	8	7	6	5	4	3	2	1	1	1

(key)

Pos.	Drivers	No.	SILGP	SNE	DON	THR	CRO	SILINT	OUL	BRH	Pts
Class 1
1	(United Kingdom) Phil Hanson (United Kingdom) Nigel Moore	19	1	12	**1**	1	**1**	1	11	**2**	170
2	(United Kingdom) Calum Lockie (United Kingdom) David Mason	1	**Ret**		15	6	3	**4**	**2**	5	107
3	(Spain) Manuel Cintrano (Spain) Javier Morcillo	3	3	**3**		8	9			1	91
4	(United Kingdom) Kevin Clarke (United Kingdom) Ian Lawson	46	5		6		2		3	3	82
4	(United Kingdom) Ryan Lyndsay	46			6						82
5	(United Kingdom) Nick Holden (United Kingdom) Andrew McKenna	7	20	2	4						55
6	(United Kingdom) Jonny MacGregor	8	23			10		11			37
6	(United Kingdom) Ben Sharich	8						11			37
7	(United Kingdom) Richard Neary (United Kingdom) Martin Short	888							1		25
8	(United Kingdom) Craig Dolby (United Kingdom) Nigel Mustill	15				**2**					22
9	(United Kingdom) Nigel Greensall (United Kingdom) Darren Nelson	18	2								20
10	(United Kingdom) Nigel Hudson (United Kingdom) Adam Wilcox	12	4								14
–	(United Kingdom) Glynn Geddie (United Kingdom) Jim Geddie	77	Ret								0
Class 2
1	(United Kingdom) Anthony Wilds (United Kingdom) Mike Wilds	9		1	3	**3**		2			85
2	(United Kingdom) Ian Heward (United Kingdom) Darelle Wilson	34	17	11	10						60
3	(United Kingdom) Bonamy Grimes	5	**Ret**	**9**				**5**		4	56
3	(United Kingdom) Johnny Mowlem	5	**Ret**	**9**						4	56
3	(United Kingdom) Charlie Hollings	5						**5**			56
4	(United Kingdom) Neil Garnham (United Kingdom) Rob Young	71	21								20
5	(United Kingdom) Ashley Bird (United Kingdom) Tom Howard (United Kingdom) Mike Moss	13					10				20
6	(United Kingdom) Mark Cunningham (United Kingdom) Peter Cunningham	32						NC	**4**		15
drivers ineligible for points
–	(United Kingdom) Neil Garnham (United Kingdom) Matt Le Breton (United Kingdom) Rob Young	71								10	0
Class 3
1	(United Kingdom) Steve Fresle (Denmark) Jacob Mathiassen	43	6	5	**5**	**3**	4	**NC**	**5**	**8**	170
2	(United Kingdom) Chris Murphy	54	10	6	7	5	**6**	7	8	11	145
2	(United Kingdom) Jody Fannin	54	10	6	7						145
2	(United Kingdom) Jonny Cocker	54				5	**6**	7	8		145
2	(United Kingdom) Matty George	54								11	145
3	(United Kingdom) Chris Randall	58	8	13	14	11		10	12		74
3	(United Kingdom) Nick Randall	58	8	13	14	11			12		74
3	(United Kingdom) Ben Salmon	58						10			74
4	(New Zealand) Dave Benett (United Kingdom) Marcus Fothergill	69	15				5	6			55
4	(United Kingdom) Adam Dawson	69					5	6			55
5	(United Kingdom) Mark Cunningham (United Kingdom) Peter Cunningham	32	**7**	**10**							37
6	(Russia) Ruben Anakhasyan (United Kingdom) Ollie Hancock	88	16	4							34
7	(United Kingdom) Chris Hart (United Kingdom) Neil Primrose	17	9								31
7	(United Kingdom) Jono Brown (United Kingdom) Graham Roberts	17			13						31
8	(United Kingdom) Neil Garnham (United Kingdom) Matt Le Breton (United Kingdom) Rob Young	7						9			17
8	(United Kingdom) Frank Bradley (United Kingdom) Tom Howard	57	13								10
10	(United Kingdom) Stuart Hall (United Kingdom) Chris Kemp	91		15							10
–	(United Kingdom) Dean Gibbs (United Kingdom) Jonathan Packer	76								DNS	0
drivers ineligible for points
–	(United Kingdom) Chris Headlam (United Kingdom) Joey Foster	55							6		0
–	(United Kingdom) Darron Lewis (United Kingdom) Daniel Wylie	34								7	0
–	(United Kingdom) Dan Kirby (United Kingdom) Tom Knight	21								9	0
Class 4
1	(United Kingdom) Tom Howard	57		**14**	**8**						93
1	(United Kingdom) Mike Moss	57		**14**	**8**			**8**			93
1	(United Kingdom) David Cooper	57					**6**	**8**			93
1	(United Kingdom) Jason Dixon (United Kingdom) Robert Gillham	57					**6**				93
1	(United Kingdom) Ashley Bird	57						**8**			93
1	(United Kingdom) Scott Adam (United Kingdom) Shaun Hollamby (United Kingdom) Andy Wilmott	57								**6**	93
2	(United Kingdom) Sam Allpass (United Kingdom) Lee Atkins	38	11			**5**			**9**		55
3	(United Kingdom) Del Shelton	13	12								20
4	(United Kingdom) Ash Woodman (United Kingdom) Keith Hemsworth	60	**18**								15
5	(United Kingdom) Richard Burrows (United Kingdom) Glenn Finn	14			11						10
Class 5
1	(Wales) Alyn James	76	15	**7**	**9**	**9**	**8**	**12**	**7**		116
1	(United Kingdom) Martin Byford	76		**7**				**12**	**7**		116
1	(United Kingdom) Daniel Wheeler	76			**9**		**8**				116
2	(United Kingdom) Adam Bewsey (United Kingdom) Alex Craven	49	**22**								63
2	(United Kingdom) Daniel Woodard	49		9	12				10	**12**	63
2	(United Kingdom) David Birrell	49		9					10	**12**	63
2	(United Kingdom) Aaron Steele	49			12						63
3	(United Kingdom) Richard Burrows (United Kingdom) Glenn Finn	14	19								20
–	(Canada) Fareed Ali (United Kingdom) Chris Valentine	24			DNS						0
Pos.	Drivers	No.	SILGP	SNE	DON	THR	CRO	SILINT	OUL	BRH	Pts
