= Nigel Moore (racing driver) =

British racing driver (born 1992)

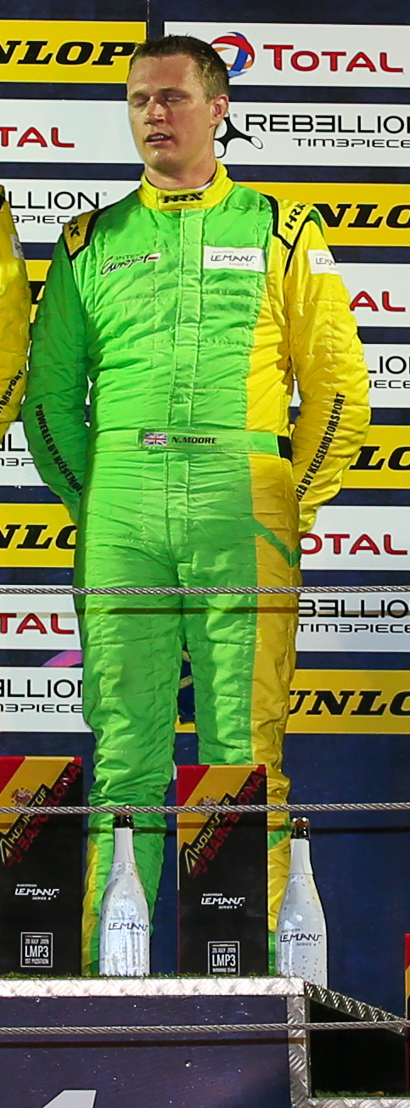
- Nigel on the LMP3 podium at 4 Hours of Barcelona, 2019
- Nationality: (United Kingdom) British
- Born: Nigel Leslie Moore; 4 January 1992 (age 34) Tockwith, England
- Relatives: Sarah Moore (sister)

Formula Palmer Audi career
- Debut season: 2010
- Categorisation: FIA Silver
- Car number: 6
- Best finish: 1st in 2010

Previous series
- 2009 2008–09 2008, 10 2007: GT4 European Cup; British GT; Ginetta G50 Cup; Ginetta Junior

Championship titles
- 2016 2010 2008 2007: Britcar Endurance Championship; Formula Palmer Audi; Ginetta G50 Cup; Ginetta Junior

Nigel Leslie Moore (born 4 January 1992 in Tockwith, England) is a British racing driver.

== Career ==
Moore began his racing career in karting, in which he competed until 2007, when he began racing in the Ginetta Junior Championship, which he won with eight victories. He graduated to the Ginetta G50 Cup for 2008, which he also won. He also took two GT4 class wins in the British GT Championship racing a Ginetta G50.

Moore raced in the series full-time in 2009. His co-driver Jody Firth won the title, due to Moore missing the Knockhill round as he was racing at the 24 Hours of Le Mans with Ginetta. At 17, he became the youngest Briton to race at the legendary race. He also raced in four races of the GT4 European Cup, winning once.

For 2010, Moore moved into single-seater racing in the Formula Palmer Audi championship. He won the title, along with a prize Formula Two scholarship. He was also shortlisted for the 2010 McLaren BRDC Young Driver of the Year award.

After leaving school in the summer of 2008, Moore started working at Ginetta, but was sacked from the company in December 2010.

In 2016, Moore and Phil Hanson drove an Audi R8 LMS to victory in the 2016 Dunlop Endurance Championship.

Moore's younger brother and sister, Edward and Sarah, also race in Britcar. They both made their debut in the Endurance championship in 2017, Ed driving a Ginetta G50 run by Tockwith Motorsport and Sarah driving a Smart ForFour.

== Racing record ==
=== Career summary ===
Season	Series	Team	Races	Poles	Wins	FLaps	Podiums	Points	Position
2007	Ginetta Junior Championship	Hepworth International	15	4	8	5	12	385	**1st**
2008	Ginetta G50 Cup	Tockwith Motorsport	19	12	14	8	18	626	**1st**
2008	British GT Championship - GT4	Team RPM	8	2	2	5	4	38	11th
2009	British GT Championship - GT4	Team WFR	12	3	10	8	12	67	**2nd**
2009	GT4 European Cup	Team RPM	4	0	1	0	1	19	11th
2009	24 Hours of Le Mans - LMP1	Team LNT	1	0	0	0	0	N/A	NC
2010	Formula Palmer Audi		20	0	3	5	12	344	**1st**
2010	Ginetta G50 Cup	Tockwith Motorsport	11	0	5	4	6	0	NC

=== Complete Ginetta Junior Championship results ===
(key) (Races in bold indicate pole position – 1 point awarded just in first race; races in italics indicate fastest lap – 1 point awarded all races;-

Year	Team	1	2	3	4	5	6	7	8	9	10	11	12	13	14	15	16	DC	Points
2007	Hepworth International	ANG; 1; 1	**ANG**; **2**; 1	SIL; 1; 1	SIL; 2; 1	DON; 1; 4	DON; 2; 11	**CRO**; **1**; 1	**CRO**; **2**; 15	PEM; 1; 1	PEM; 2; 1	BHI; 1 C	BHI; 2; 3	BHI; 3; 3	**BHI**; **1**; 2	BHI; 2; 2	BHI; 3; 1	1st	385

=== Complete Ginetta G50 Cup results ===
(key) (Races in bold indicate pole position – 1 point awarded just in first race; races in italics indicate fastest lap – 1 point awarded all races;-

Year	Team	1	2	3	4	5	6	7	8	9	10	11	12	13	14	15	16	17	18	19	20	DC	Points
2008	Tockwith Motorsport	**OUL**; **1**; 1	**OUL**; **2**; 1	**CAD**; **1**; 1	**CAD**; **2**; 1	**KNO**; **1**; 1	**KNO**; **2**; 1	**CRO**; **1**; 1	**CRO**; **2**; 3	**SNE**; **1**; 1	SNE; 2; 1	THR; 1; 2	**THR**; **2**; 1	BHI; 1; 1	BHI; 2 DNS	SIL; 1; 1	SIL; 2; 2	MAL; 1; 1	MAL; 2 Ret	**DON**; **1**; 2	**DON**; **2**; 1	1st	626

=== Complete British GT results ===
(key) (Races in bold indicate pole position in class) (Races in italics indicate fastest lap in class)

Year	Entrant	Chassis	Class	1	2	3	4	5	6	7	8	9	10	11	12	13	14	DC	Pts
2008	Team RPM	Ginetta G50	GT4	OUL; 1	OUL; 2	KNO; 1	KNO; 2	ROC; 1	ROC; 2	SNE; 1; 22	SNE; 2; 16	**THR**; **1** Ret	**THR**; **2**; 10	BRH; 1; 11	**BRH**; **2**; 15	SIL; 1 Ret	DON; 1; 12	11th	38
2009	Team WFR	Ginetta G50	GT4	OUL; 1; 8	**OUL**; **2**; 9	SPA; 1; 12	SPA; 2; 9	ROC; 1; 8	**ROC**; **2**; 11	KNO; 1	KNO; 2	SNE; 1; 6	**SNE**; **2**; 10	DON; 1; 7	SIL; 1; 8	BRH; 1; 11	**BRH**; **2**; 10	2nd	67

=== Complete 24 Hours of Le Mans results ===
Year	Team	Co-Drivers	Car	Class	Laps	Pos.	Class Pos.
2009	(United Kingdom) Team LNT	(United Kingdom) Lawrence Tomlinson (United Kingdom) Richard Dean	Ginetta-Zytek GZ09S	LMP1	178	DNF	DNF
2017	(United Kingdom) Tockwith Motorsports	(United Kingdom) Phil Hanson (India) Karun Chandhok	Ligier JS P217-Gibson	LMP2	351	11th	9th
2019	(Poland) Inter Europol Competition	(Poland) Jakub Śmiechowski (United Kingdom) James Winslow	Ligier JS P217-Gibson	LMP2	325	45th	16th

=== Complete Britcar results ===
(key) (Races in bold indicate pole position in class – 1 point awarded just in first race; races in italics indicate fastest lap in class – 1 point awarded all races;-

Year	Team	Car	Class	1	2	3	4	5	6	7	8	DC	CP	Points
2016	Tockwith Motorsport	Audi R8 LMS	1	SILGP; 1	SNE; 12	**DON**; 1	THR; 1	**CRO**; 1	SILINT; 1	OUL; 11	**BRH**; 2	1st	1st	170

=== Complete European Le Mans Series results ===
Year	Entrant	Class	Chassis	Engine	1	2	3	4	5	6	Rank	Points
2016	Tockwith Motorsports	LMP3	Ligier JS P3	Nissan VK50VE 5.0 L V8	SIL	IMO	RBR	**LEC**; 6	SPA; 12	EST	21st	9.5
2017	Tockwith Motorsports	LMP2	Ligier JS P217	Gibson GK428 4.2 L V8	SIL; 5	MNZ; 11	RBR; 9	LEC	SPA	ALG	16th	12.5
2019	Inter Europol Competition	LMP3	Ligier JS P3	Nissan VK50VE 5.0 L V8	LEC; 3	MNZ; 2	CAT; 1	SIL; 2	SPA; 2	ALG; 11	2nd	94.5
2020	Inter Europol Competition	LMP3	Ligier JS P320	Nissan VK56DE 5.6L V8	LEC; 2	SPA; Ret	LEC; 3	MNZ	ALG		11th	33

Sporting positions
Preceded by James Harrison	Ginetta Junior Championship; Champion; 2007	Succeeded by Dino Zamparelli
Preceded by Inaugural	Ginetta G50 Cup; Champion; 2008	Succeeded by Nathan Freke
Preceded by Richard Plant	Formula Palmer Audi; Champion; 2010	Succeeded by None (Series ended)
Preceded by David Mason; Calum Lockie	Britcar Endurance; Champion; 2016; With: Phil Hanson	Succeeded by Witt Gamski; Ross Wylie
Preceded by Ho-Pin Tung; David Cheng	Asian Le Mans Series; LMP3 Champion; 2016–17; With: Phil Hanson	Succeeded by Guy Cosmo; Patrick Byrne
