= Phil Hanson (racing driver) =

British racing driver (born 1999)

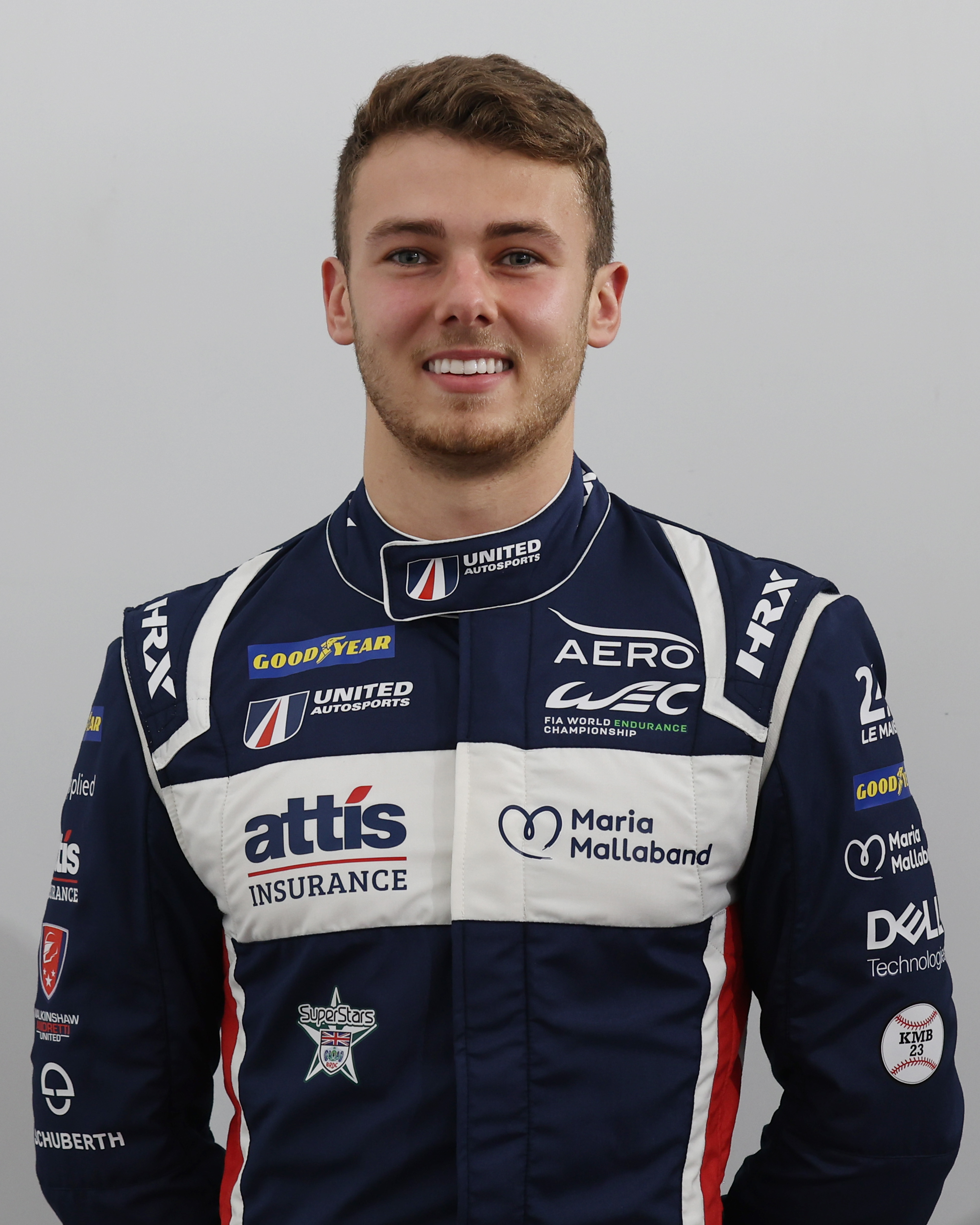
- Hanson in 2022
- Nationality: (United Kingdom) British
- Born: Philip Beauchamp Hanson; 5 July 1999 (age 27) Sunningdale, Berkshire, England

FIA WEC career
- Debut season: 2019–20
- Current team: AF Corse
- Categorisation: FIA Bronze (2016); FIA Silver (2017–2020); FIA Gold (2021–2026); FIA Platinum (2027–)
- Car number: 83
- Former teams: Tockwith Motorsports, United Autosports, Hertz Team Jota
- Starts: 51 (51 entries)
- Wins: 8
- Podiums: 14
- Poles: 2
- Fastest laps: 1
- Best finish: 1st (LMP2) in 2019–20

Previous series
- 2017–23 2016–17, 18–19, 23 2016: European Le Mans Series; Asian Le Mans Series Dunlop Endurance Championship

Championship titles
- 2019–20 2020 2018–19 2016–17 2016: FIA WEC – LMP2; ELMS – LMP2; AsLMS – LMP2; AsLMS – LMP3; Britcar Endurance Championship

Awards
- 2016–17: AsLMS - Rookie of the Year

Philip Beauchamp Hanson (born 5 July 1999) is a British racing driver who competes in the FIA World Endurance Championship for AF Corse as a Ferrari factory driver.

A product of the sports car racing ladder, Hanson saw early success in Britcar and LMP3 in 2016, and made his LMP2 debut at age 17. Between 2018 and 2023, Hanson drove for United Autosports in LMP2, notably winning the FIA World Endurance Championship, European Le Mans Series and 24 Hours of Le Mans all in 2020. Hanson graduated to Hypercar with Hertz Team Jota in 2024. After joining AF Corse's #83 Ferrari, Hanson won the 2025 24 Hours of Le Mans overall with Robert Kubica and Yifei Ye. He was named a Ferrari factory driver for 2026.

== Early career ==
Philip Beauchamp Hanson was born in Sunningdale, Berkshire, on 5 July 1999. He is the son of Richard Peter Hanson, the co-founder of private equity fund Doughty Hanson & Co. He won his first championship at the age of 15, winning the Whilton Mill Club Championship with the BKC Racing team. Subsequently, he went on to win the Super One British X30 Junior Karting Championship, again with BKC Racing, in 2015, registering multiple wins and podium positions.

Hanson made his sportscar racing debut in the Britcar Endurance Championship, driving for Tockwith Motorsport alongside Nigel Moore. The pair clinched the title during the Brands Hatch season finale, tying by 170 points with the pairing of Jacob Mathiassen and Steve Fresle but winning it due to their amount of class victories. Hanson capped off his 2016 season with a win in a British LMP3 Cup event at Snetterton, the first event of its kind in the UK. Hanson and Moore combined to achieve a pole position, which they converted into victory.

At the end of the year, Hanson and Moore took part in the LMP3 class of the Asian Le Mans Series, driving a Ligier JS P3. Having won races at Fuji and Sepang, the Brits would claim the LMP3 class championship.

== LMP2 career ==
=== 2017: LMP2 debut ===
In June 2017, Hanson become the youngest overall finisher in his Le Mans 24 Hour debut, finishing ninth in the LMP2 class and 11th overall. Hanson was partnered by Moore and Karun Chandhok, racing a Ligier-Gibson JSP217.

Hanson's schedule for the year continued with three appearances in the FIA World Endurance Championship races: Spa; Le Mans and the Nürburgring, alongside three appearances in the European Le Mans Series at the start of the year.

=== 2018: First year with United Autosports ===
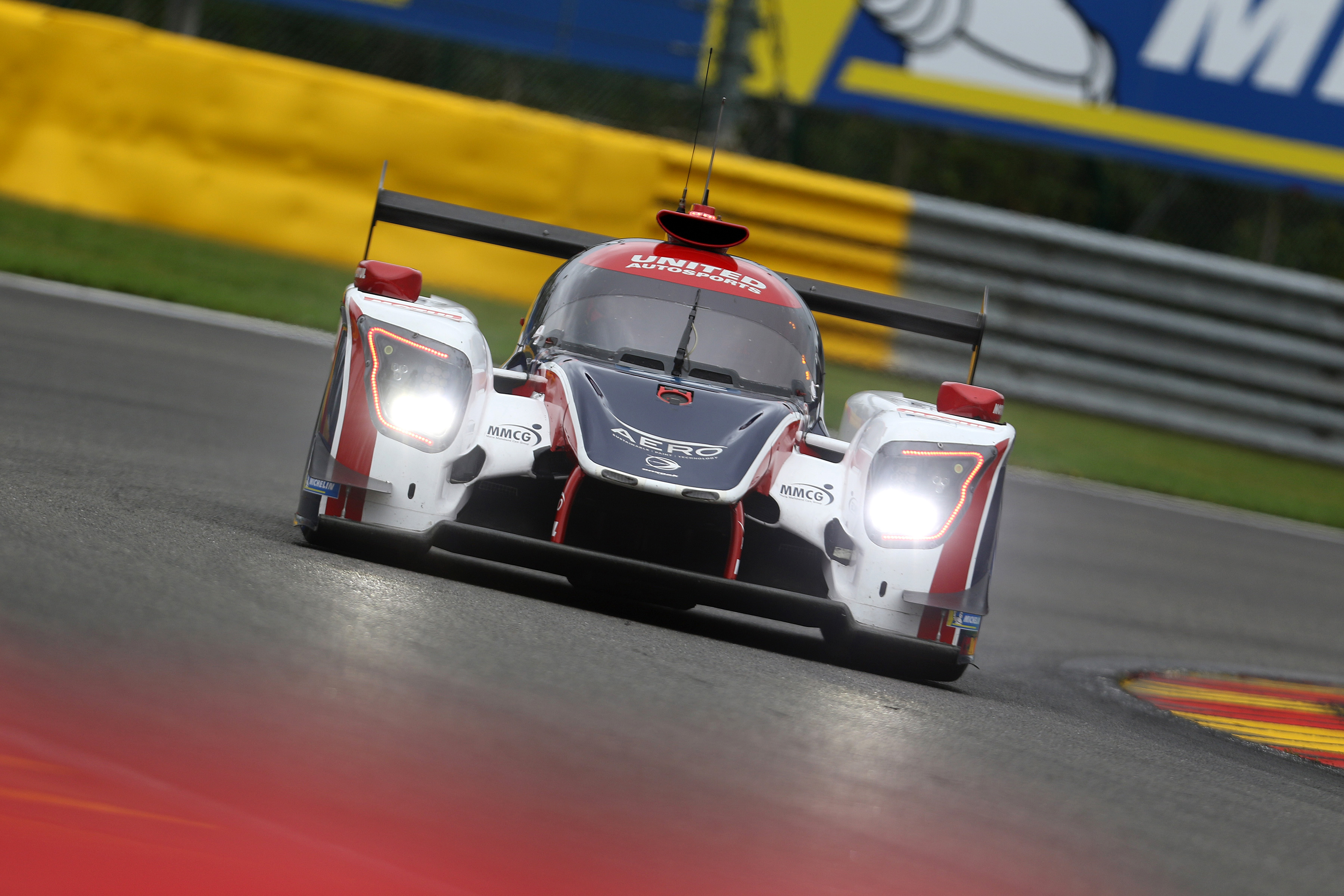
Phil Hanson and co-driver Filipe Albuquerque raced the United Autosports Ligier JSP217 to victory in Round 5 of the ELMS at Spa Francorchamps, 23 September 2018

For the 2018 season, Hanson joined United Autosports, signing up for a full season in the ELMS. Prior to the start of the campaign, Hanson took part in the 24 Hours of Daytona, partnering Fernando Alonso and Lando Norris. He would take part in two further races of the IMSA SportsCar Championship, namely at Sebring and Watkins Glen. In the ELMS, Hanson finished fifth in the final standings, having achieved three podiums, including wins at Spa and Portimão, in the six-race series. He also raced in the 24 Hours of Le Mans with Paul di Resta and ELMS teammate Filipe Albuquerque, though the trio's race would end due to a crash from di Resta.

=== 2019: Asian Le Mans Series title ===
Hanson raced a United Autosports-entered Ligier JS P2 with di Resta in the 2018–19 Asian Le Mans Series. The duo finished on the podium at every round, thus earning the LMP2 title by 11 points.

Returning to the European Le Mans Series in 2019, Hanson would partner Albuquerque for the entire season. After starting the year by using a Ligier JS P217, the team switched to an Oreca 07 for the final three races, where a win and a second place propelled them to fourth in the standings.

=== 2020: Success on two fronts & Le Mans win ===
In 2020, Hanson contested the FIA World Endurance Championship, co-driving alongside Albuquerque and Paul di Resta. Despite a retirement at the season opener in Silverstone, the team would impose themselves quickly, finishing third at both Fuji and Shanghai. From there on, a winning streak followed, as the trio of Hanson, Albuquerque, and di Resta claimed victories at Bahrain, Austin, and Spa-Francorchamps, before a class win at the postponed 24 Hours of Le Mans handed the title to United, therefore making Hanson the youngest ever WEC champion.

Hanson would continue with United throughout the remainder of the year, once again partnering Albuquerque in the ELMS. A dominant campaign followed, as the pair won the races at Spa, Le Castellet, and Monza, which, coupled with third places in the first and last races of the year, gave Hanson and Albuquerque the title one race before the end of the season.

=== 2021: WEC title defense ===
United Autosports, Hanson, and Albuquerque returned to the WEC in 2021, entering their championship defense alongside new silver-ranked driver Fabio Scherer, with Hanson being upgraded to gold by the FIA. The year began promisingly, as an impressive opening stint by Hanson opened the curtains for a dominant win at Spa. Another podium in Portimão, where Albuquerque and Scherer had to be replaced due to COVID-19, followed, before the crew took another controlled win in Monza. However, the 24 Hours of Le Mans came as a huge roadblock in the team's championship aspirations, as an alternator failure cost the team around 90 minutes of repair time during the early hours of the morning, leading them to an 18th place by the checkered flag. With a pair of fourth places at Bahrain rounding off the season, Hanson ended up fourth in the drivers' standings.

In addition, Hanson once again raced in the ELMS, this time being partnered by Tom Gamble and Jonathan Aberdein. In what ended up being a dominant season for the debuting WRT outfit, Hanson and his teammates acquitted themselves well, winning the final race in the Algarve and finishing second in the championship.

=== 2022: Winless world championship campaign ===
Hanson continued on in the WEC with United and Albuquerque, this time being joined by Will Owen. The year turned out to be a disappointment, as bad luck, including a collision at the start of the Le Mans 24 Hours caused by René Rast and a problem with the acceleration sensor at Monza, contributed towards a lack of podiums by the end of the year. For Hanson, however, the ELMS provided a silver lining to his season: driving alongside Gamble and Duncan Tappy, Hanson managed to finish second in Imola and win at Spa-Francorchamps, results which had third place in the teams' standings as their consequence.

=== 2023: Title battles in two series ===
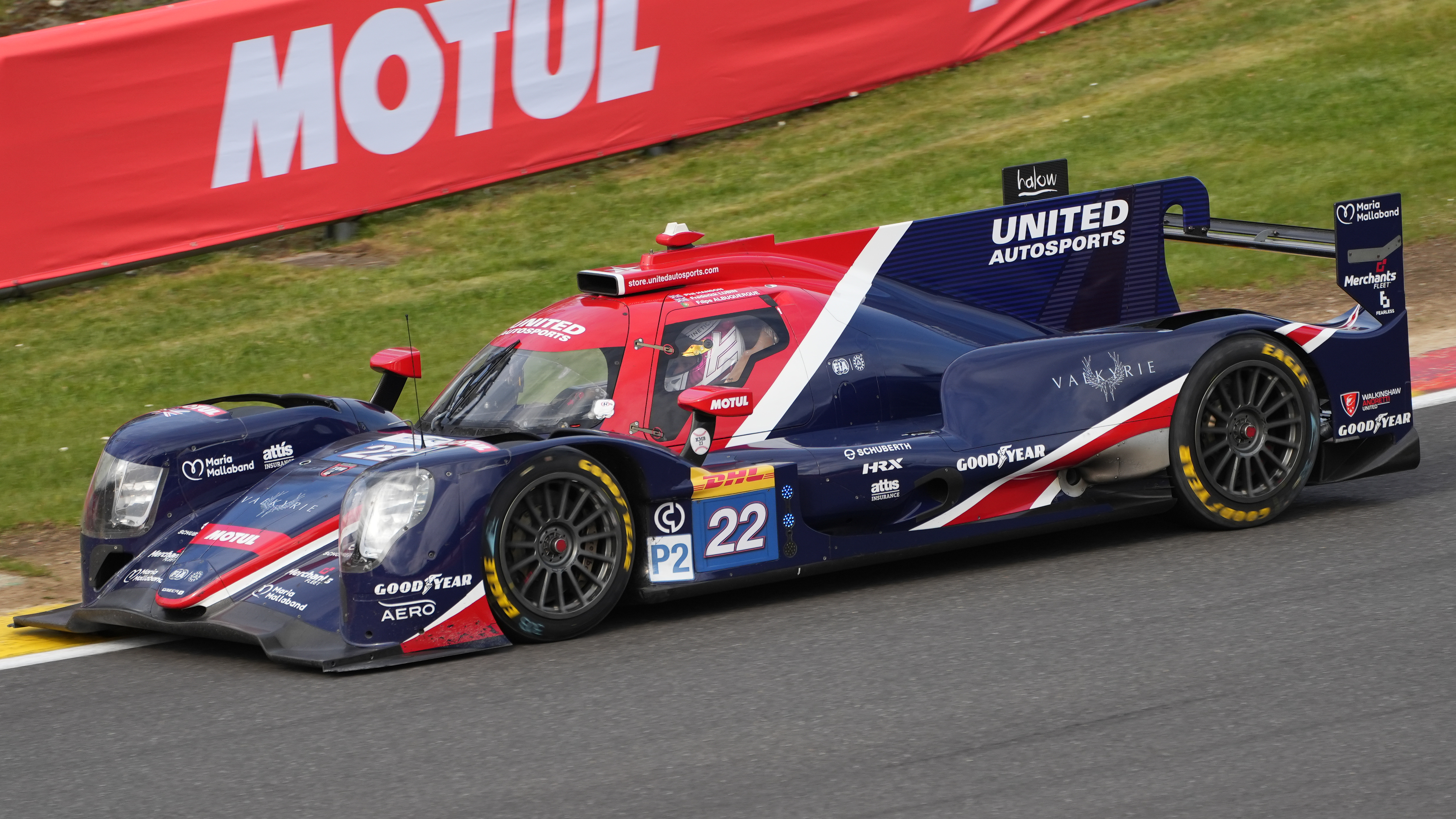
Hanson competing at the 2023 6 Hours of Spa-Francorchamps.

Hanson returned to United for a sixth year in 2023, continuing to race in the WEC and ELMS championships. Together with Albuquerque and Frederick Lubin, Hanson would have more success than the previous year, finishing second at both Sebring and Portimão, a race where Hanson narrowly lost out on victory to experienced teammate Oliver Jarvis. After a fifth place in Spa, the team led the championship going into the 24 Hours of Le Mans, where a major mistake from Lubin resulted in extensive car damage which had to be repaired, leading the trio to finish in eleventh place. Having narrowly missed out on a podium at Monza, Hanson and his teammates finished second at Fuji and ninth in Bahrain, putting them third in the LMP2 standings.

In the ELMS, where Hanson partook alongside Jarvis and Marino Sato, a pair of last-placed finishes in the newly segregated Pro class was followed by Hanson achieving pole position in Aragón, one which he and his teammates would convert into a victory. In spite of a weak result in Belgium caused by a startline collision, Hanson and his teammates would cap off the season expertly with a pair of wins at Portimão, results that earned the team a runner-up spot in the standings, 13 points behind the title-winning Algarve Pro crew.

== Career in the top class ==
=== 2024: Hypercar and GTP step-up ===
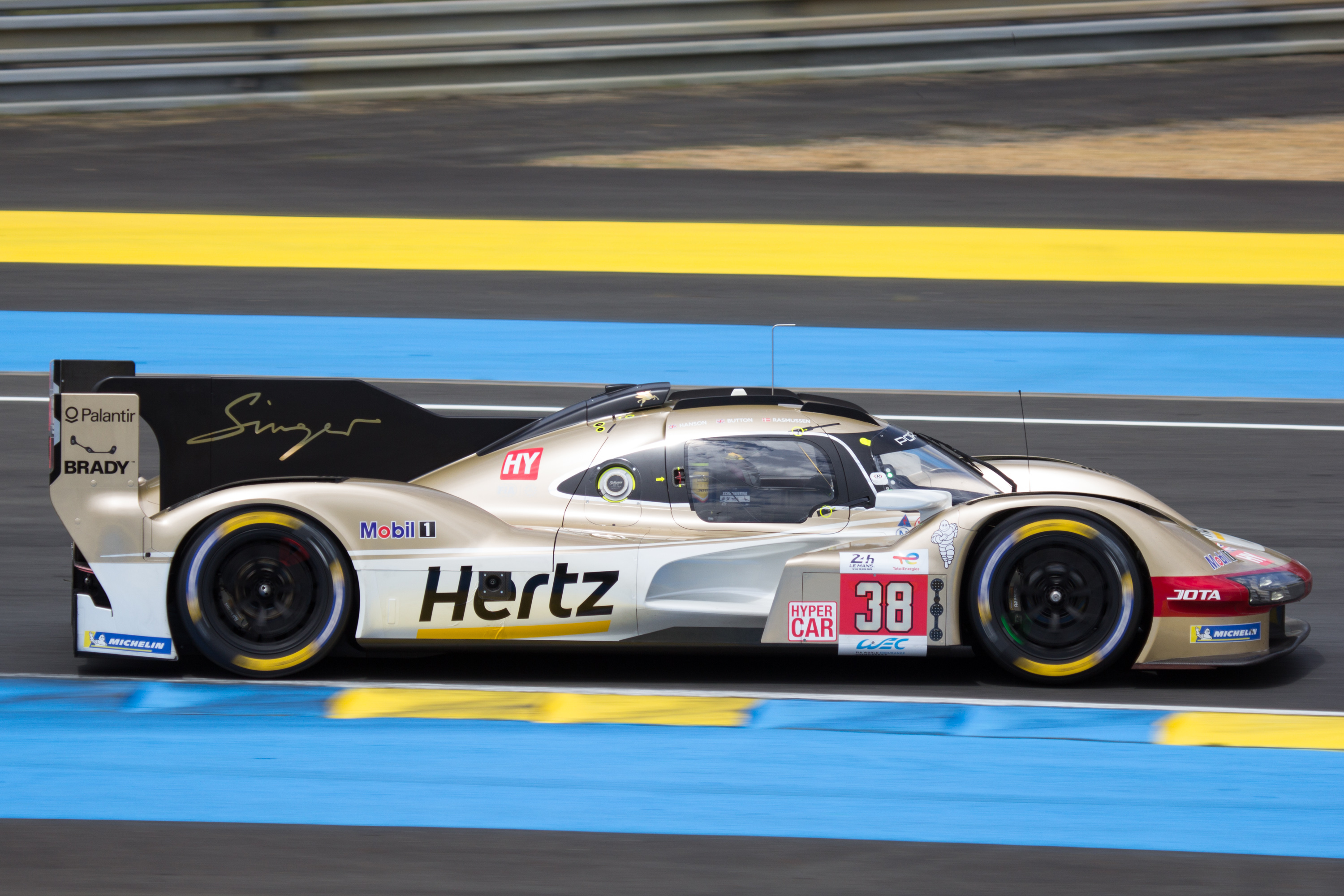
Hanson's No. 38 car at the 2024 24 Hours of Le Mans

At the end of 2023, it was announced that Hanson would be stepping up to the Hypercar category of the WEC for the following year, driving a Porsche 963 for customer outfit Hertz Team Jota alongside Oliver Rasmussen and Jenson Button. Furthermore, the Briton joined JDC-Miller MotorSports, another Porsche customer, in IMSA, becoming the team's designated third driver for the Michelin Endurance Cup rounds. Hanson enjoyed a string of impressive performances in the latter, outqualifying the works Porsches at Sebring and Watkins Glen In addition, Hanson stood out by charging to the front at the start of the Watkins Glen race, before the car was penalised for hitting a gate in pit lane. Hanson's best IMSA result came at Indianapolis, where two disqualifications allowed the No. 85 to inherit third place.

The WEC campaign was more difficult, as Hanson and his teammates failed to score points in the opening three races. This included a retirement at Spa, where Hanson was tagged into an accident with a GT car by René Rast. They finished ninth at Le Mans and took their first privateer class win with a seventh at São Paulo. Despite finishing each of the subsequent three races in the points, the No. 38 crew finished 19th in the drivers' standings and lost out on the privateer title to the sister car.

=== 2025: Le Mans victory at AF Corse ===
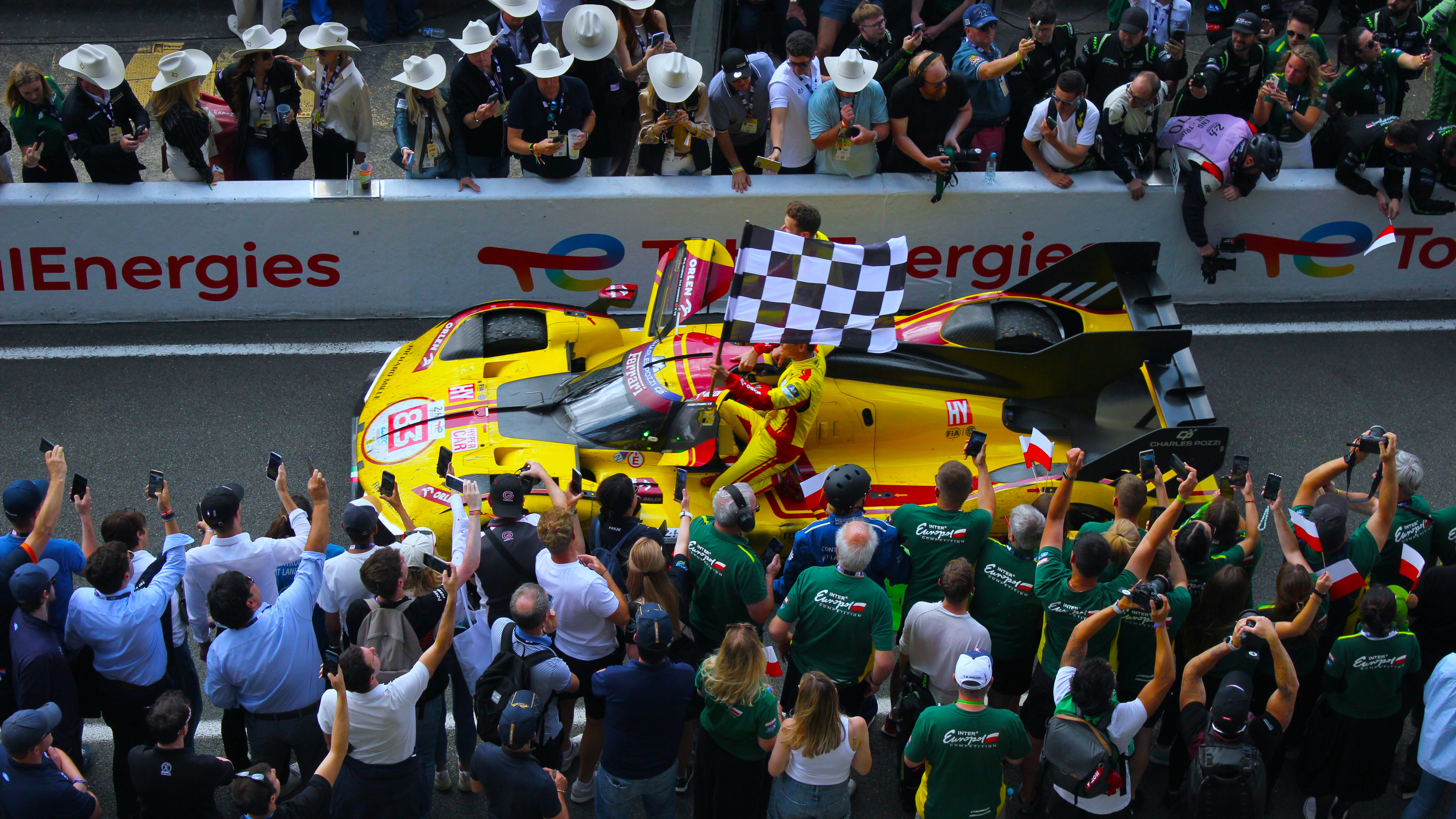
Hanson and co-drivers Kubica, and Ye took the victory of the 2025 24 Hours of Le Mans

Hanson joined the No. 83 Ferrari AF Corse for the 2025 season of WEC, replacing Robert Shwartzman. A strong run for Ferrari at the season opener in Qatar, where Hanson led until being passed by Miguel Molina with four hours to go, allowed the No. 83 crew of him, Robert Kubica, and Ye Yifei to finish second. After Hanson had held second at Imola during the opening hour, the team dropped to fourth by the checkered flag due to a longer pit stop during hour 4. The team suffered a major blow in the title fight at Spa, as Hanson was forced to pit twice within the opening hour to fix a turbo issue. Hanson and the team's crowning moment of the year came at the 2025 24 Hours of Le Mans: despite a mistake during the night from Hanson which allowed James Calado to take the lead, as well as another lead overtake from Calado on Hanson during the early morning hours, a clean run to the flag by Kubica allowed the No. 83 AF Corse crew to claim victory. This made Hanson the 35th British driver to triumph at the event.

Though Ferrari struggled for pace in São Paulo, Hanson and his teammates closed the gap to the leading No. 51 to 12 points by finishing eighth. Kubica scored pole in Austin, but after Hanson let Calado through to the lead in the tricky wet conditions, the race unravelled: the No. 83 lost time during a pit stop due to an LMGT3 car that prevented Hanson from entering his pit box smoothly. They then received a five-second penalty for a pit stop infringement before driving through the pit lane, having incorrectly suspected a puncture, finishing seventh as a result. Hanson and his teammates managed to finish ninth at Fuji, despite suffering serious contact from an Aston Martin Valkyrie. With a fifth place in Bahrain, the No. 83 team secured second place in the drivers' championship, having additionally won every race in the two-car World Cup class for privateer entries.

=== 2026 ===
In January 2026, Hanson was announced as an official Ferrari factory driver on a multi-year deal.

== Racing record ==
=== Racing career summary ===
Season	Series	Team	Races	Wins	Poles	F/Laps	Podiums	Points	Position
2016	Britcar Endurance Championship	Tockwith Motorsport	8	5	3	5	6	170	**1st**
2016	European Le Mans Series - LMP3	Tockwith Motorsport	2	0	0	0	0	9.5	21st
2016	GT3 Le Mans Cup	Tockwith Motorsport	3	0	0	0	0	20.5	10th
2016–17	Asian Le Mans Series - LMP3	Tockwith Motorsports	4	3	2	0	4	77	**1st**
2017	FIA World Endurance Championship - LMP2	Tockwith Motorsports	4	0	0	0	1	0	NC†
2017	24 Hours of Le Mans - LMP2	Tockwith Motorsports	1	0	0	0	0	N/A	9th
2017	European Le Mans Series - LMP2	Tockwith Motorsports	3	0	0	0	0	12.5	16th
2018	IMSA SportsCar Championship - P	United Autosports	3	0	0	0	0	72	28th
2018	European Le Mans Series - LMP2	United Autosports	6	2	0	0	3	54	5th
2018	24 Hours of Le Mans - LMP2	United Autosports	1	0	0	0	0	N/A	DNF
2018–19	Asian Le Mans Series - LMP2	United Autosports	4	1	1	0	4	80	**1st**
2019	European Le Mans Series - LMP2	United Autosports	6	1	0	2	3	71	4th
2019	24 Hours of Le Mans - LMP2	United Autosports	1	0	0	0	0	N/A	4th
2019–20	FIA World Endurance Championship - LMP2	United Autosports	8	4	0	0	6	190	**1st**
2020	European Le Mans Series - LMP2	United Autosports	5	3	0	1	5	109	**1st**
2020	24 Hours of Le Mans - LMP2	United Autosports	1	1	0	0	1	N/A	**1st**
2021	FIA World Endurance Championship - LMP2	United Autosports	6	2	0	1	3	107	4th
2021	24 Hours of Le Mans - LMP2	United Autosports	1	0	0	0	0	N/A	18th
2021	European Le Mans Series - LMP2	United Autosports	6	1	0	1	4	86	**2nd**
2022	FIA World Endurance Championship - LMP2	United Autosports USA	6	0	0	0	0	50	9th
2022	24 Hours of Le Mans - LMP2	United Autosports USA	1	0	0	0	0	N/A	10th
2022	European Le Mans Series - LMP2	United Autosports USA	6	1	0	0	2	73	4th
2022	IMSA SportsCar Championship - LMP2	United Autosports USA	1	0	0	0	0	0	NC†
2023	FIA World Endurance Championship - LMP2	United Autosports	7	1	1	0	3	104	**3rd**
2023	Asian Le Mans Series - LMP2	United Autosports	4	0	0	1	0	36	8th
2023	24 Hours of Le Mans - LMP2	United Autosports	1	0	0	0	0	N/A	11th
2023	European Le Mans Series - LMP2	United Autosports USA	6	3	1	0	3	100	**2nd**
2024	FIA World Endurance Championship - Hypercar	Hertz Team Jota	8	0	0	0	0	28	19th
2024	24 Hours of Le Mans - Hypercar	Hertz Team Jota	1	0	0	0	0	N/A	9th
2024	IMSA SportsCar Championship - GTP	JDC–Miller MotorSports	5	0	0	0	1	1290	13th
2025	FIA World Endurance Championship - Hypercar	AF Corse	8	1	0	0	2	117	**2nd**
2025	24 Hours of Le Mans - Hypercar	AF Corse	1	1	0	0	1	N/A	**1st**
2026	FIA World Endurance Championship - Hypercar	AF Corse	8	0	0	0	0	49	14th
2026–27	Asian Le Mans Series - LMP2	AF Corse							

† As Hanson was a guest driver, he was ineligible to score championship points.

=== Complete Britcar results ===
(key) (Races in bold indicate pole position in class)

Year	Team	Car	Class	1	2	3	4	5	6	7	8	DC	CP	Points
2016	Tockwith Motorsport	Audi R8 LMS	1	SILGP; 1	SNE; 12	**DON**; 1	THR; 1	**CRO**; 1	SILINT; 1	OUL; 11	**BRH**; 2	1st	1st	170

=== Complete Asian Le Mans Series results ===
Year	Entrant	Class	Chassis	Engine	1	2	3	4	Rank	Points
2016–17	Tockwith Motorsports	LMP3	Ligier JS P3	Nissan VK50 5.0 L V8	**ZIC**; 2	**FUJ**; 1	CIC; 1	SEP; 1	1st	77
2018–19	United Autosports	LMP2	Ligier JS P2	Nissan VK45 4.5 L V8	SHA; 2	**FUJ**; 2	CIC; 1	SEP; 2	1st	80
2023	United Autosports	LMP2	Oreca 07	Gibson GK428 4.2 L V8	DUB; 1; 5	DUB; 2; 7	ABU; 1; 5	ABU; 2; 5	8th	36

=== Complete European Le Mans Series results ===
Year	Entrant	Class	Chassis	Engine	1	2	3	4	5	6	Rank	Points
2016	Tockwith Motorsports	LMP3	Ligier JS P3	Nissan VK50VE 5.0 L V8	SIL	IMO	RBR	**LEC**; 6	SPA; 12	EST	21st	9.5
2017	Tockwith Motorsports	LMP2	Ligier JS P217	Gibson GK428 4.2 L V8	SIL; 5	MNZ; 11	RBR; 9	LEC	SPA	ALG	16th	12.5
2018	United Autosports	LMP2	Ligier JS P217	Gibson GK428 4.2 L V8	LEC; 12	MNZ; 10	RBR; 3	SIL; Ret	SPA; 1‡	ALG; 1	5th	54
2019	United Autosports	LMP2	Ligier JS P217	Gibson GK428 4.2 L V8	LEC; 6	MNZ; 4	CAT; 7	SIL; Ret	**SPA**; 1	**ALG**; 2	4th	71
2020	United Autosports	LMP2	Oreca 07	Gibson GK428 4.2 L V8	**LEC**; 3	**SPA**; 1	**LEC**; 1	**MNZ**; 1	ALG; 3		1st	109
2021	United Autosports	LMP2	Oreca 07	Gibson GK428 4.2 L V8	CAT; 3	RBR; 7	LEC; 2	MNZ; 2	SPA; 8	ALG; 1	2nd	86
2022	United Autosports USA	LMP2	Oreca 07	Gibson GK428 4.2 L V8	LEC; 7	IMO; 2	MNZ; 4	CAT; 4	SPA; 1	ALG; Ret	4th	73
2023	United Autosports USA	LMP2	Oreca 07	Gibson GK428 4.2 L V8	CAT; 6	LEC; 7	**ARA**; 1	SPA; 5	POR; 1	ALG; 1	2nd	100

^{‡} Half points awarded as less than 75% of race distance was completed.

=== Complete 24 Hours of Le Mans results ===
Year	Team	Co-Drivers	Car	Class	Laps	Pos.	Class Pos.
2017	(United Kingdom) Tockwith Motorsports	(United Kingdom) Nigel Moore (India) Karun Chandhok	Ligier JS P217-Gibson	LMP2	351	11th	9th
2018	(United States) United Autosports	(United Kingdom) Paul di Resta (Portugal) Filipe Albuquerque	Ligier JS P217-Gibson	LMP2	288	DNF	DNF
2019	(United States) United Autosports	(United Kingdom) Paul di Resta (Portugal) Filipe Albuquerque	Ligier JS P217-Gibson	LMP2	365	9th	4th
2020	(United States) United Autosports	(United Kingdom) Paul di Resta (Portugal) Filipe Albuquerque	Oreca 07-Gibson	LMP2	370	5th	**1st**
2021	(United Kingdom) United Autosports USA	(Switzerland) Fabio Scherer (Portugal) Filipe Albuquerque	Oreca 07-Gibson	LMP2	328	40th	18th
2022	(United States) United Autosports USA	(Portugal) Filipe Albuquerque (United States) Will Owen	Oreca 07-Gibson	LMP2	366	14th	10th
2023	(United Kingdom) United Autosports	(Portugal) Filipe Albuquerque (United Kingdom) Frederick Lubin	Oreca 07-Gibson	LMP2	321	21st	11th
2024	(United Kingdom) Hertz Team Jota	(United Kingdom) Jenson Button (Denmark) Oliver Rasmussen	Porsche 963	Hypercar	311	9th	9th
2025	(Italy) AF Corse	(Poland) Robert Kubica (China) Yifei Ye	Ferrari 499P	Hypercar	387	**1st**	**1st**
2026	(Italy) AF Corse	(Poland) Robert Kubica (China) Yifei Ye	Ferrari 499P	Hypercar	381	7th	7th
Souces:

=== Complete IMSA SportsCar Championship results ===
Year	Entrant	Class	Chassis	Engine	1	2	3	4	5	6	7	8	9	10	Rank	Points	Ref
2018	United Autosports	P	Ligier JS P217	Gibson GK428 4.2 L V8	DAY; 13	SEB; 5	LBH	MDO	DET	WGL; 5	MOS	ELK	LGA	PET	28th	72	
2022	United Autosports	LMP2	Oreca 07	Gibson GK428 V8	DAY; 6†	SEB	LGA	MDO	WGL	ELK	PET				NC†	0†	
2024	JDC-Miller MotorSports	GTP	Porsche 963	Porsche 9RD 4.6 L Turbo V8	DAY; 6	SEB; 11	LBH	LGA	DET	WGL; 9	ELK	IMS; 3	PET; 11		13th	1290	

^{†} Points only counted towards the Michelin Endurance Cup, and not the overall LMP2 Championship.

=== Complete FIA World Endurance Championship results ===
Year	Entrant	Class	Car	Engine	1	2	3	4	5	6	7	8	Rank	Points
2019–20	United Autosports	LMP2	Oreca 07	Gibson GK428 4.2 L V8	SIL; Ret	FUJ; 3	SHA; 3	**BHR**; 1	COA; 1	**SPA**; 1	LMS; 1	**BHR**; 4	1st	190
2021	United Autosports USA	LMP2	Oreca 07	Gibson GK428 4.2 L V8	SPA; 1	ALG; 3	MNZ; 1	LMS; 10	BHR; 4	BHR; 4			4th	107
2022	United Autosports USA	LMP2	Oreca 07	Gibson GK428 4.2 L V8	SEB; 7	SPA; 5	LMS; 7	MNZ; 13	FUJ; 7	BHR; 6			9th	50
2023	United Autosports	LMP2	Oreca 07	Gibson GK428 4.2 L V8	SEB; 1	ALG; 2	SPA; 5	LMS; 8	MNZ; 6	**FUJ**; 2	BHR; 9		3rd	104
2024	Hertz Team Jota	Hypercar	Porsche 963	Porsche 9RD 4.6 L Turbo V8	QAT; NC	IMO; 11	SPA; Ret	LMS; 9	SÃO; 7	COA; 10	FUJ; 6	BHR; 7	19th	28
2025	AF Corse	Hypercar	Ferrari 499P	Ferrari F163CG 3.0 L Turbo V6	QAT; 2	IMO; 4	SPA; 15	LMS; 1	SÃO; 8	**COA**; 7	FUJ; 9	BHR; 5	2nd	117
2026	AF Corse	Hypercar	Ferrari 499P	Ferrari F163CG 3.0 L Turbo V6	IMO; 10	SPA; 6	LMS; 7	SÃO; 5	COA; 13	FUJ; 12	CAT; 5	MNZ; 6	14th	49

Sporting positions
Preceded by David Mason; Calum Lockie	Britcar Endurance; Champion; 2016; With: Nigel Moore	Succeeded by Witt Gamski; Ross Wylie
Preceded by Ho-Pin Tung; David Cheng	Asian Le Mans Series; LMP3 Champion; 2016–17; With: Nigel Moore	Succeeded by Guy Cosmo; Patrick Byrne
Preceded by Harrison Newey; Stéphane Richelmi; Thomas Laurent	Asian Le Mans Series; LMP2 Champion; 2018–19; With: Paul di Resta	Succeeded by James French; Roman Rusinov; Leonard Hoogenboom
Preceded by Memo Rojas; Paul-Loup Chatin	European Le Mans Series; LMP2 Champion; 2020; With: Filipe Albuquerque	Succeeded by Robert Kubica; Louis Delétraz; Yifei Ye
Preceded by Nicolas Lapierre; André Negrão; Pierre Thiriet	FIA Endurance Trophy for LMP2 Drivers; 2019–20; With: Filipe Albuquerque	Succeeded by Robin Frijns; Ferdinand Habsburg; Charles Milesi
Preceded by Antonio Fuoco; Miguel Molina; Nicklas Nielsen	Winner of the 24 Hours of Le Mans; 2025; With: Robert Kubica & Yifei Ye	Succeeded by Incumbent
