= Toyota Sprinter =

Compact car variant of the Toyota Corolla (1968–2002)

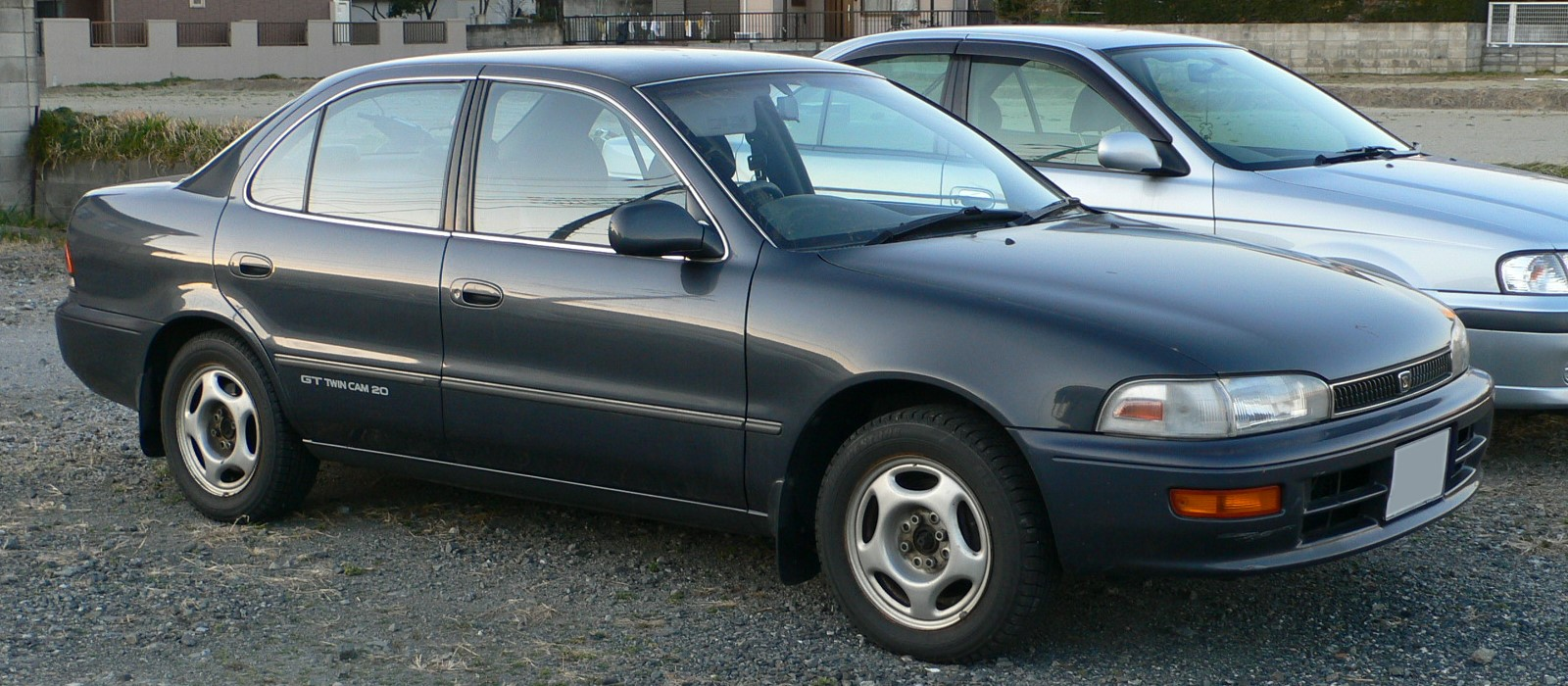
- Toyota Sprinter 1.6 GT sedan (AE101)

Overview
- Manufacturer: Toyota
- Production: April 1968 – July 2002

Chronology
- Successor: Toyota Allex (for Sprinter); Toyota Probox (for Sprinter van/business wagon)

The Toyota Sprinter (Japanese: トヨタ・スプリンター, Toyota Supurintā) is a compact car manufactured by Toyota as a variant of the Corolla. Exclusively sold in the Japanese domestic market, the Sprinter was aimed to be sportier than its Corolla sibling and also using different sheet metal mostly on the C-pillar. The Sprinter was exclusive to Toyota Auto Store, while the Corolla is similarly unique to Toyota Corolla Store. In 1998 Toyota Auto Store was replaced by Netz Store.

The Sprinter is notable for being used as the base vehicle for two joint projects between Toyota and General Motors in the United States, known under GM as the S-car. From 1984 to 1997, variants of the Sprinter were manufactured by NUMMI in Fremont, California, known as the Chevrolet Nova (1984–1988) and Geo Prizm (1988–1997).

Each generation of the Corolla had a corresponding Sprinter sibling, until the introduction of the E120-series Corolla in 2000. The Sprinter was indirectly replaced by a rebadged Corolla hatchback called Allex, which also sold at the Netz Store dealer network, and commercial Sprinter wagons were replaced by Probox.

== First generation (E10; 1968) ==
First generation
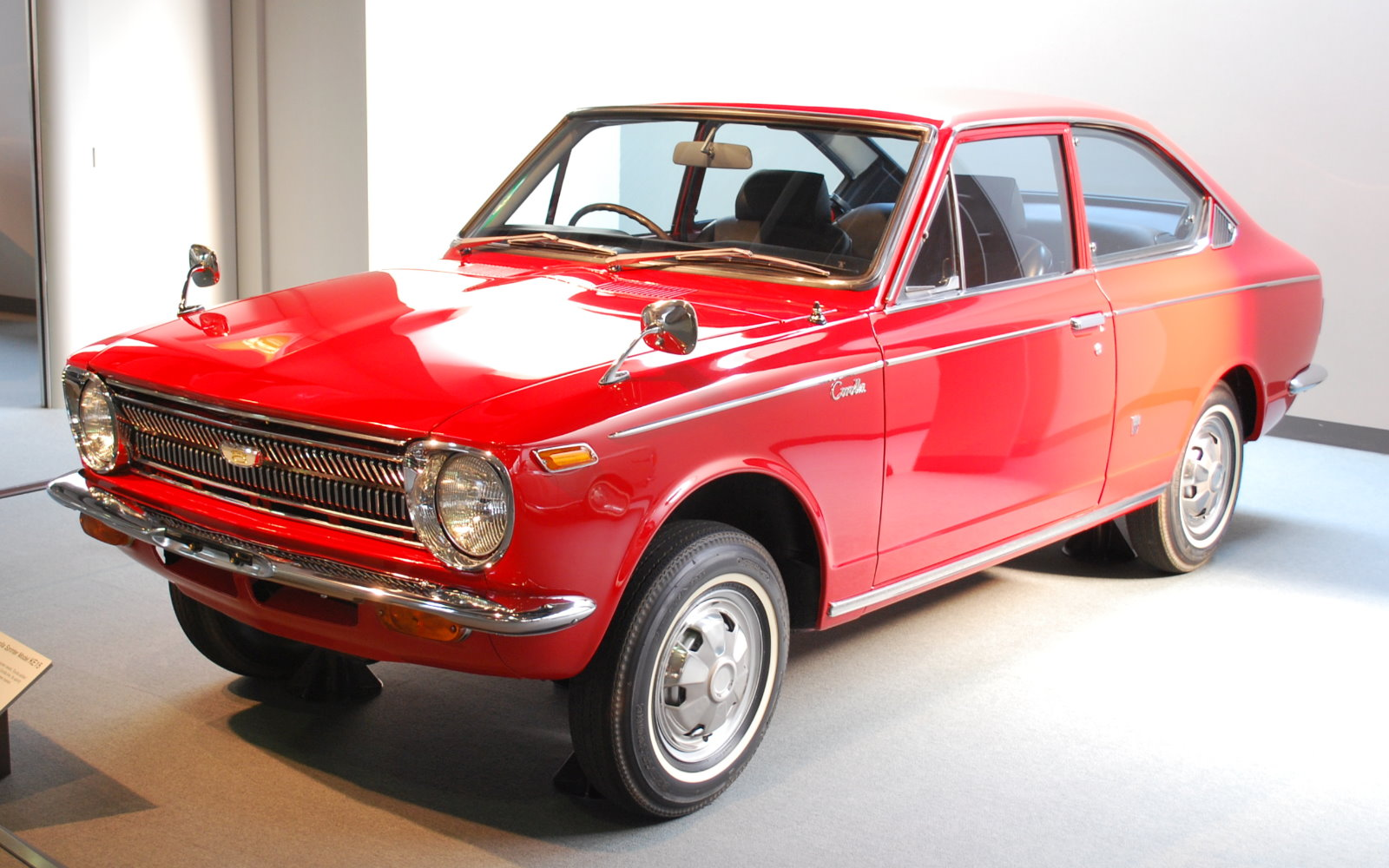
- Facelift Toyota Corolla Sprinter 1100 Deluxe (KE15, Japan)

Overview
- Model code: E10
- Also called: Toyota Corolla Sprinter
- Production: 1968–1970
- Assembly: Japan: Takaoka Plant, Toyota City

Body and chassis
- Body style: 2-door fastback coupé
- Layout: Front engine, rear-wheel drive
- Related: Toyota Corolla (E10)

Powertrain
- Engine: 1.1 L K/K-B/K-C I4 (KE15); 1.2 L 3K/3K-B/3K-C I4 (KE17)
- Transmission: 4-speed K40 manual; 2-speed "Toyoglide" A20 automatic

Dimensions
- Wheelbase: 2,285 mm (90.0 in)
- Length: 3,845 mm (151.4 in) (pre-facelift); 3,855 mm (151.8 in) (facelift)
- Width: 1,485 mm (58.5 in)
- Height: 1,345 mm (53.0 in)
- Curb weight: 705–735 kg (1,554.3–1,620.4 lb)

The first generation Sprinter was introduced in April 1968, thirteen months after the introduction of the regular first generation Corolla (E10). The car was marketed as a fastback coupé version of the Corolla and sold at Japanese dealership sales channel called Toyota Auto Store. and Corolla was sold at a different dealership in Japan called Toyota Corolla Store. This was the only version to include the word "Corolla" in its name.

In Japan, the coupé was offered in three trim levels; Standard, Deluxe and SL. The Standard and Deluxe trims differed in equipment options such as radio, boot mat and metallic body paint. The SL trim, based on the Deluxe trim, added front disc brake, tachometer, console box, bullet-shaped wing mirrors and SL badge on the front grille.

Like the rest of the E10 Corolla range, the coupé was originally powered by a 1077 cc K engine, producing 60 PS (44 kW; 59 hp). The sporty SL trim was equipped with more powerful high compression dual carburetors K-B engine, producing 73 PS (54 kW; 72 hp). The K engine was paired with either 4-speed manual (column or floor shift) or a 2-speed "Toyoglide" automatic transmission, while the K-B engine in the SL trim was only available with floor shift manual transmission.

In February 1969, a minor facelift was introduced with larger amber front turn signals, a standard front 3-point seatbelt, headrest, interior improvement and a new SL emblem design. Another improvement occurred in September 1969 with a bigger 1166 cc 3K engine with output 68 PS (50 kW; 67 hp), while the SL trim was also upgraded with 3K-B high compression dual carburetors engine, generating 78 PS (57 kW; 77 hp). The "Corolla" name was also dropped from the brochure, but the emblems on the grille and front wings were retained. This new model with 1.2 L engine now bearing KE17 code.

The Corolla Sprinter was also sold in Europe and North America as a part of Corolla's range.

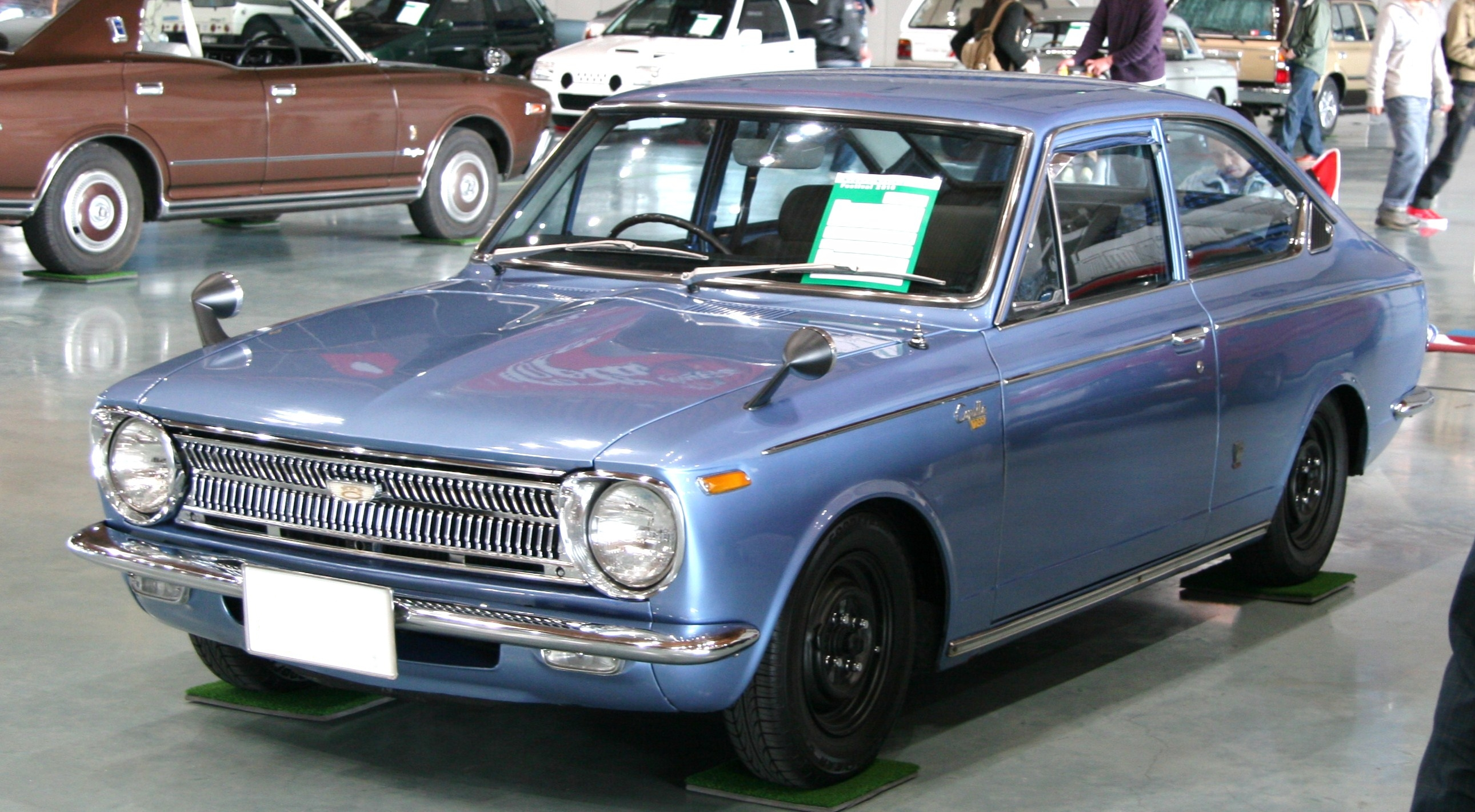
Corolla Sprinter 1100 Deluxe (KE15, pre-facelift)
Note: The wing mirrors are from the SL trim.

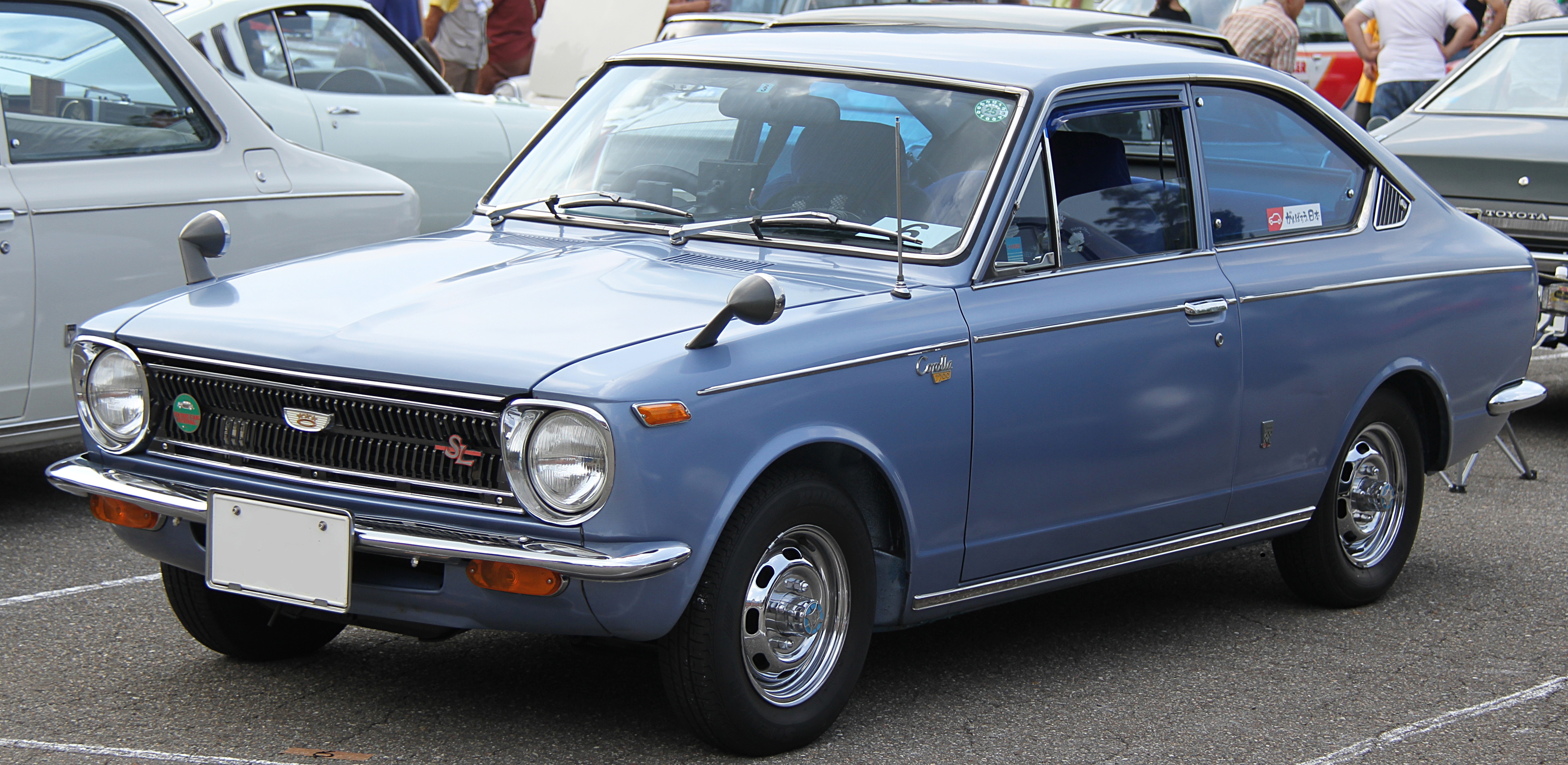
Corolla Sprinter 1200 SL (KE17, facelift)

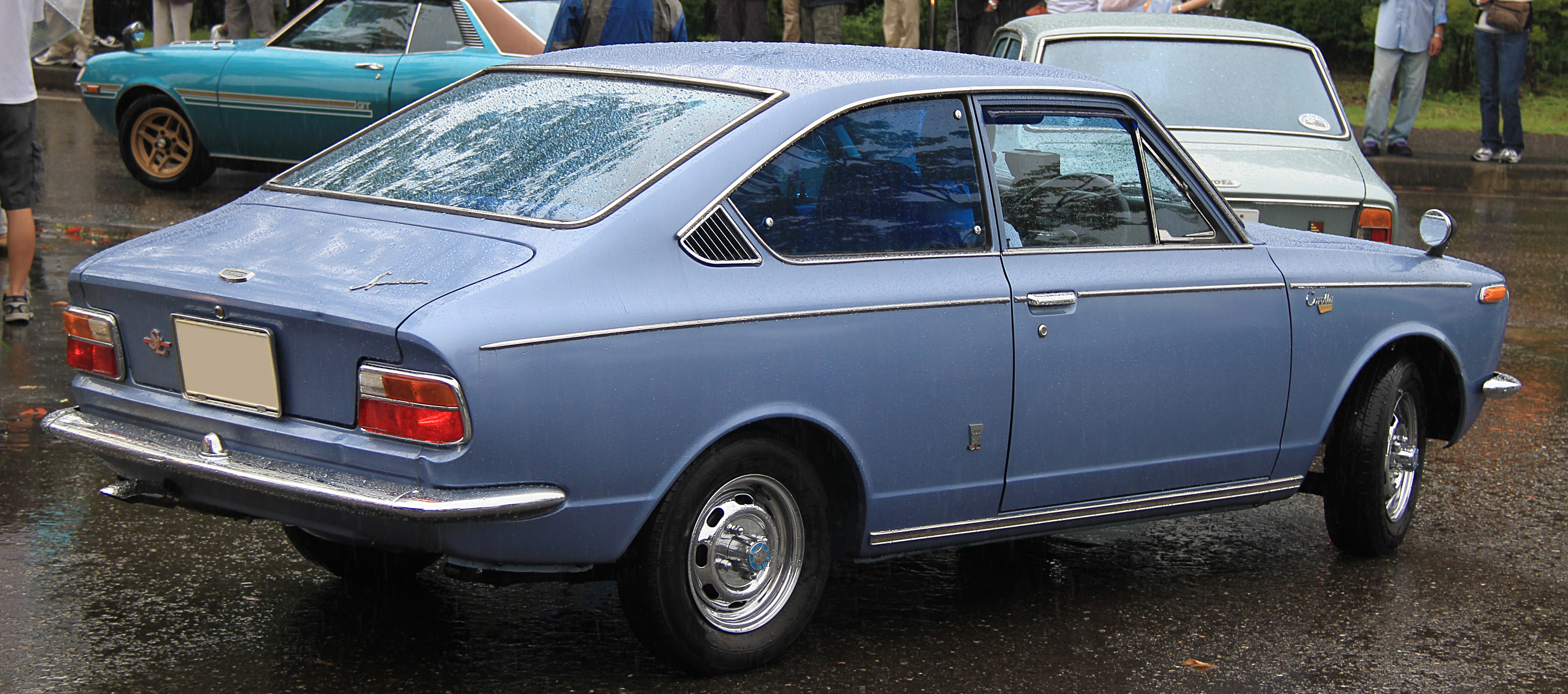
Rear view

== Second generation (E20; 1970) ==
Second generation
- 1973 Sprinter SR Coupé

Overview
- Model code: E20
- Production: 1970–1974
- Assembly: Japan: Takaoka Plant, Toyota City

Body and chassis
- Body style: 2-door coupé (E25/27); 4-door sedan (E20/21)
- Layout: Front engine, rear-wheel drive
- Related: Toyota Corolla (E20); Toyota Sprinter Trueno/Corolla Levin (TE27); Daihatsu Charmant (A10/20/40)

Powertrain
- Engine: 1.2 L 3K/3K-B/3K-BR/3K-D I4 (KE20/25); 1.4 L T/T-B/T-BR/T-D I4 (TE20/25); 1.6 L 2T-B/2T-BR I4 (TE21/27)
- Transmission: 4-speed K40/T40 manual; 5-speed K50/T50 manual; 2-speed "Toyoglide" A20 automatic (except dual carburetors and 1.6 L models)

Dimensions
- Wheelbase: 2,335 mm (91.9 in)
- Length: Coupé: 3,945 mm (155.3 in) (1970–1971); 3,965 mm (156.1 in) (1971–1972); 3,970–4,030 mm (156.3–158.7 in) (1972–1974); Sedan: 3,990 mm (157.1 in) (1971–1972); 3,995 mm (157.3 in) (1972–1974)
- Width: 1,505 mm (59.3 in)
- Height: 1,345 mm (53.0 in) (coupé); 1,375 mm (54.1 in) (sedan)
- Curb weight: 755–875 kg (1,664.5–1,929.0 lb)

In May 1970, the Sprinter was released as the sister car of the second generation Corolla coupé, as the coupé was no longer exclusive to Sprinter. Toyota had promised its Toyota Corolla Store dealers in Japan that they would receive exclusive rights to sell the Corolla. In order to sell through the Toyota Auto Store dealer network, the Sprinter was no longer bearing Corolla nameplate, even though the differences were mostly cosmetic. The wagon/van version of Corolla (KE26/TE28V) was not available for the Sprinter.

The 3K/3K-B engines were inherited from the previous generation, with additional high compression single carburettor 3K-D and low compression dual carburetors 3K-BR engines. A 1407 cc T engine was added to the line up in September 1970, followed by more powerful T-B/BR/D engines for sporty SL/SR models which could be paired with new 5-speed manual transmission option in April 1971. The 4-door sedan version of Sprinter debuted in August 1971 (which later became the basis of Daihatsu Charmant), together with the facelifted coupé. range received the 1588 cc, DOHC 2T-G engine in March 1972; this model was known as the Sprinter Trueno, the twin of the Corolla Levin. Another facelift occurred in August 1972, the 5-speed manual became available for the sporty SL/SR grades with 1.2 L 3K-B/BR engines and additional bumper extensions for the 1.4-litre coupés. The coupé The OHV dual carburetors version of 2T-G engine called 2T-B/BR was launched in April 1973 specially for SL, SR and cheaper model of Sprinter Trueno called the "Sprinter Trueno J".

In 1973, the Sprinter was joined by the Toyota Starlet as a smaller companion at Toyota Auto Store locations.

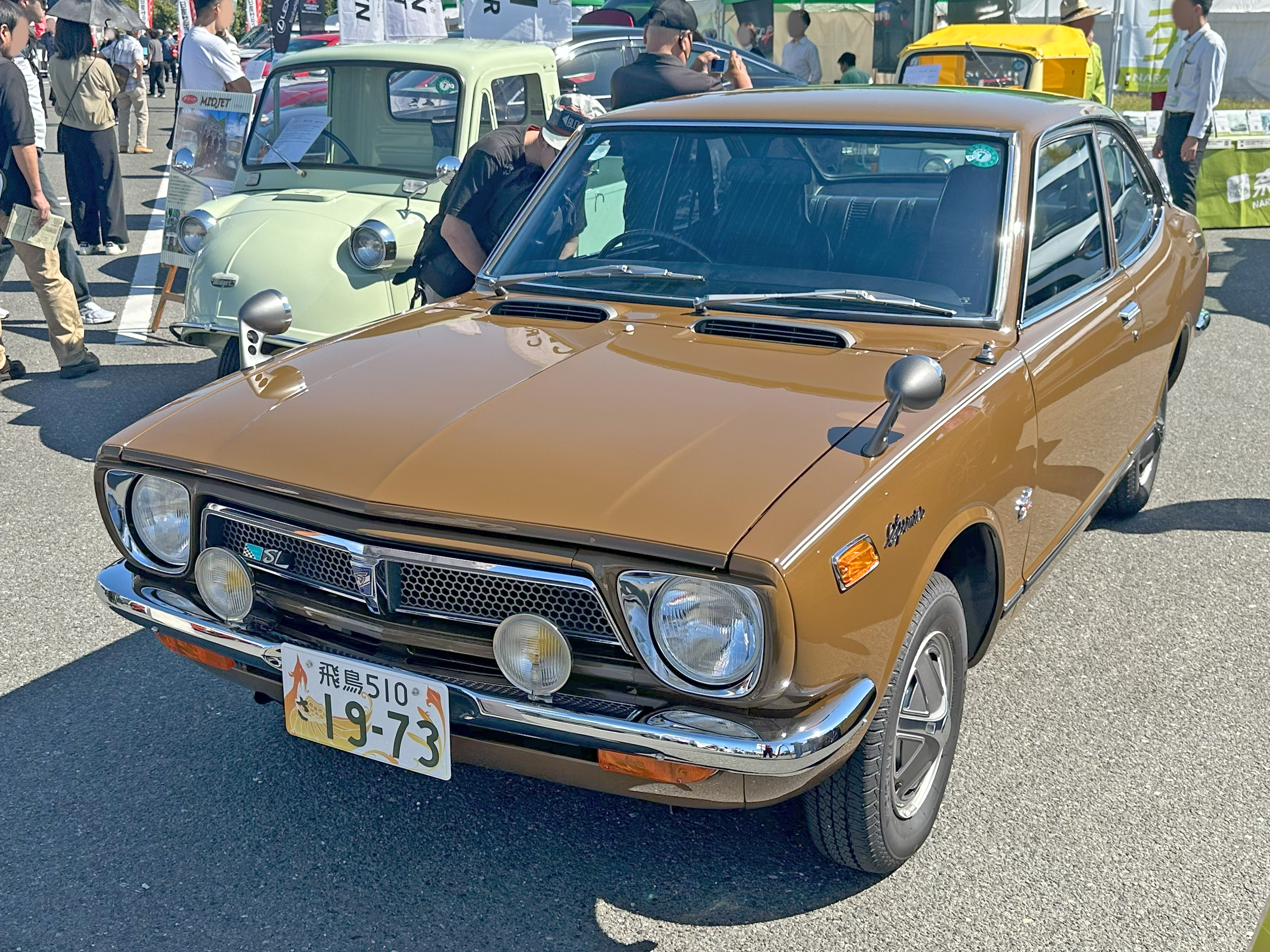
Sprinter 1200 SL coupé (KE25, second facelift)

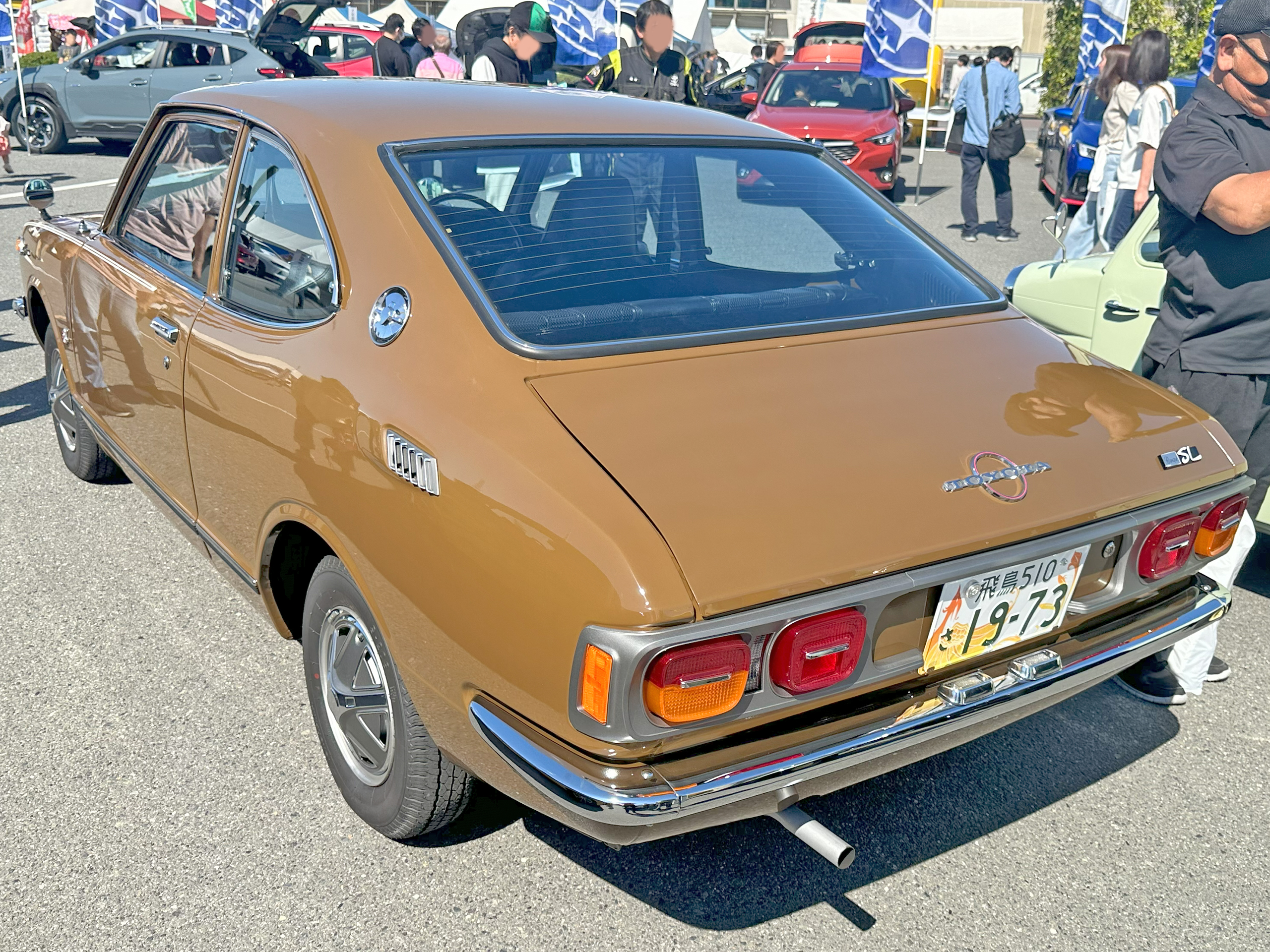
Rear view

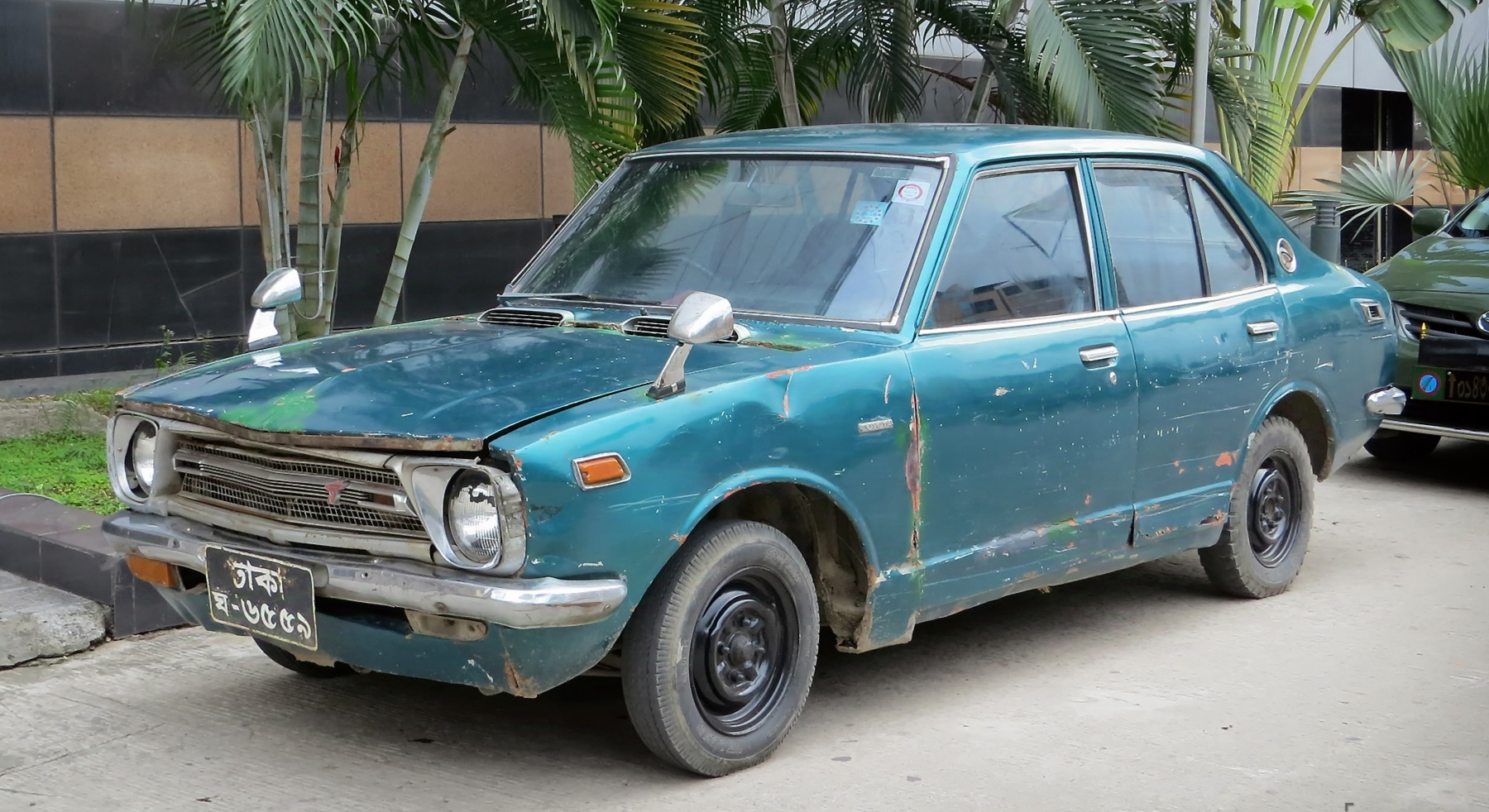
Toyota Sprinter 1200 Deluxe sedan (KE20, second facelift)

== Third generation (E40, E60; 1974) ==
Third generation
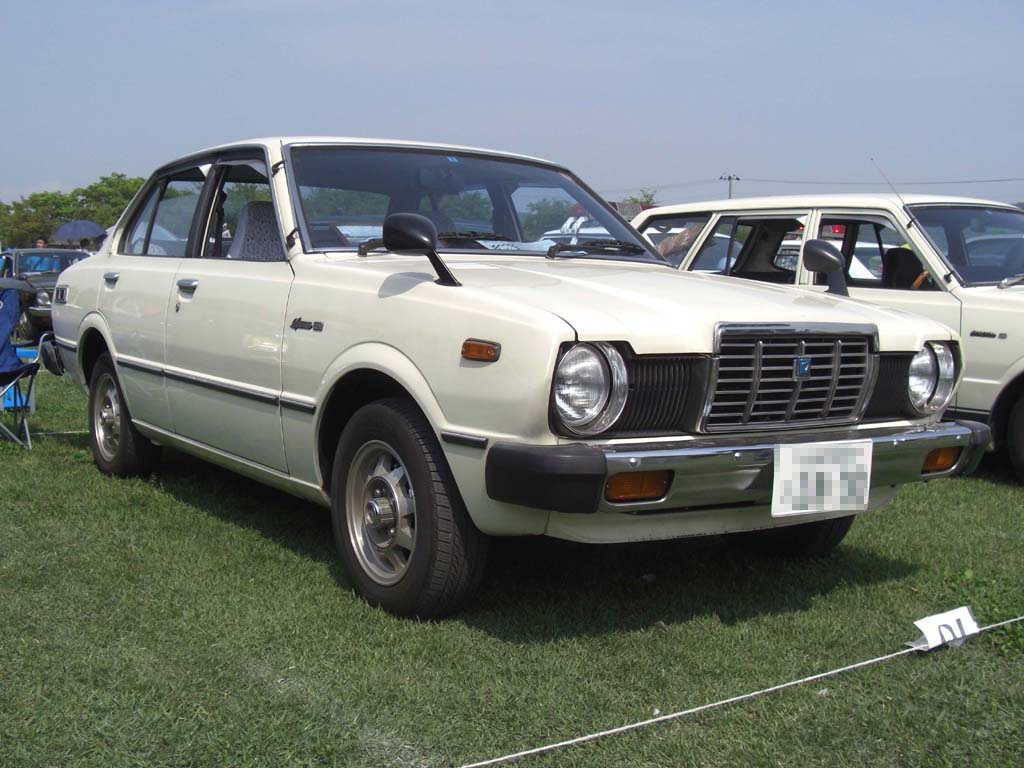
- Toyota Sprinter 1300 DX sedan (KE65, second facelift)

Overview
- Model code: E40/60
- Production: 1974–1979
- Assembly: Japan: Takaoka Plant, Toyota City; Japan: Higashi-Fuji plant, Susono, Shizuoka (Kanto Auto Works)

Body and chassis
- Body style: 2-door coupé (E45/47/60/61/62/65/66); 2-door hardtop coupé (E60/61/62/65/66); 3-door liftback (E60/61/62/65/66); 4-door sedan (E40/41/60/61/62/65/66)
- Layout: Front engine, rear-wheel drive
- Related: Toyota Corolla (E30/50); Toyota Sprinter Trueno/Corolla Levin (TE37/47/51/55/61/65)

Powertrain
- Engine: 1.2 L 3K-BR/H/U I4 (KE40/60); 1.3 L 4K-U I4 (KE65); 1.4 L T/T-BR/T-U I4 (TE40/45/60); 1.6 L 2T/2T-B/2T-BR/2T-U I4 (TE41/47/61); 1.6 L 2T-GEU I4 (TE61/65); 1.6 L 12T/12T-U I4 (TE62/66)
- Transmission: 2-speed A20 automatic; 3-speed A30 automatic; 4-speed K40/T40 manual; 5-speed K50/T50 manual

Dimensions
- Wheelbase: 2,370 mm (93.3 in)
- Length: 3,995–4,165 mm (157.3–164.0 in) (hardtop/sedan); 4,070–4,245 mm (160.2–167.1 in) (coupé); 4,120–4,290 mm (162.2–168.9 in) (liftback)
- Width: 1,570 mm (61.8 in) (sedan/hardtop); 1,600 mm (63.0 in) (coupé); 1,600–1,615 mm (63.0–63.6 in) (liftback)
- Height: 1,310 mm (51.6 in) (coupé); 1,310–1,320 mm (51.6–52.0 in) (liftback); 1,350–1,360 mm (53.1–53.5 in) (sedan); 1,360 mm (53.5 in) (hardtop)
- Curb weight: 895–985 kg (1,973.1–2,171.6 lb)

April 1974 brought the third generation Sprinter based on the third generation E30 Corolla 2-door coupé and 4-door sedan. Once again, the differences between the Corolla and Sprinter were mostly cosmetic. The sedans received a more formal upright grille, while the coupé received a sleeker, aerodynamic looking frontal treatment.

The Corollas were given E30–38 codes while the Sprinters were given corresponding E41–47 codes, making it the only generation that did not bear same chassis codes as Corolla. A three-door shooting brake style liftback with the coupé's front end was added to the line up in January 1976.

In 1976 in Japan, due to tightening emission standards, all engines with dual carburettors were deleted from the line up and replaced emission compliant engines. Engines with "U" suffix used the TTC-C catalytic converter system. Some engines, such as the 1.6 L 12T engine used the TTC-L (lean burn) technology. These Japanese market vehicles became the E60 series (E50 for Corolla).

In January 1977, a minor facelift was introduced along with an additional hardtop coupé variant and the return of Trueno with the new fuel injected 1.6 L 2T-GEU, which was also added to the liftback GT. Another round of emission tweaks happened again in mid 1977, with the introduction of the 1.3 L 4K-U engine as the new standard for the base models, replacing the smaller 1.2 L 3K-U engine. The short-lived 12T engine was also refined to become the 12T-U using the TTC-C catalytic converter system. The Sprinter underwent its second facelift in April 1978, which can be identified by its thick shock-absorbing bumpers and a visual similarity to the all-new Chaser coupé which became the top-level product at Toyota Auto Store locations.

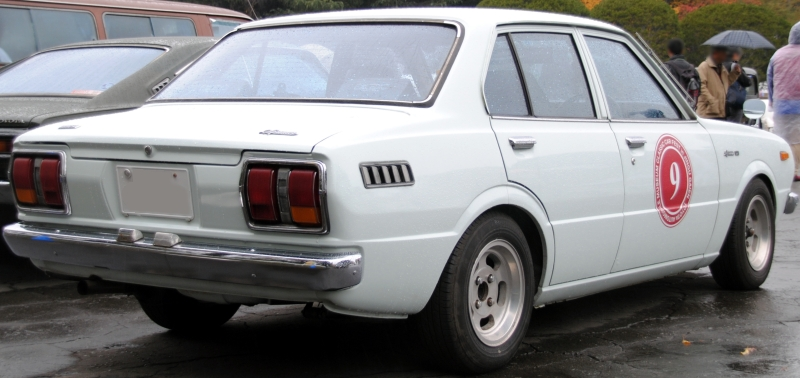
Sprinter 1200 DX sedan (KE40, pre-facelift)

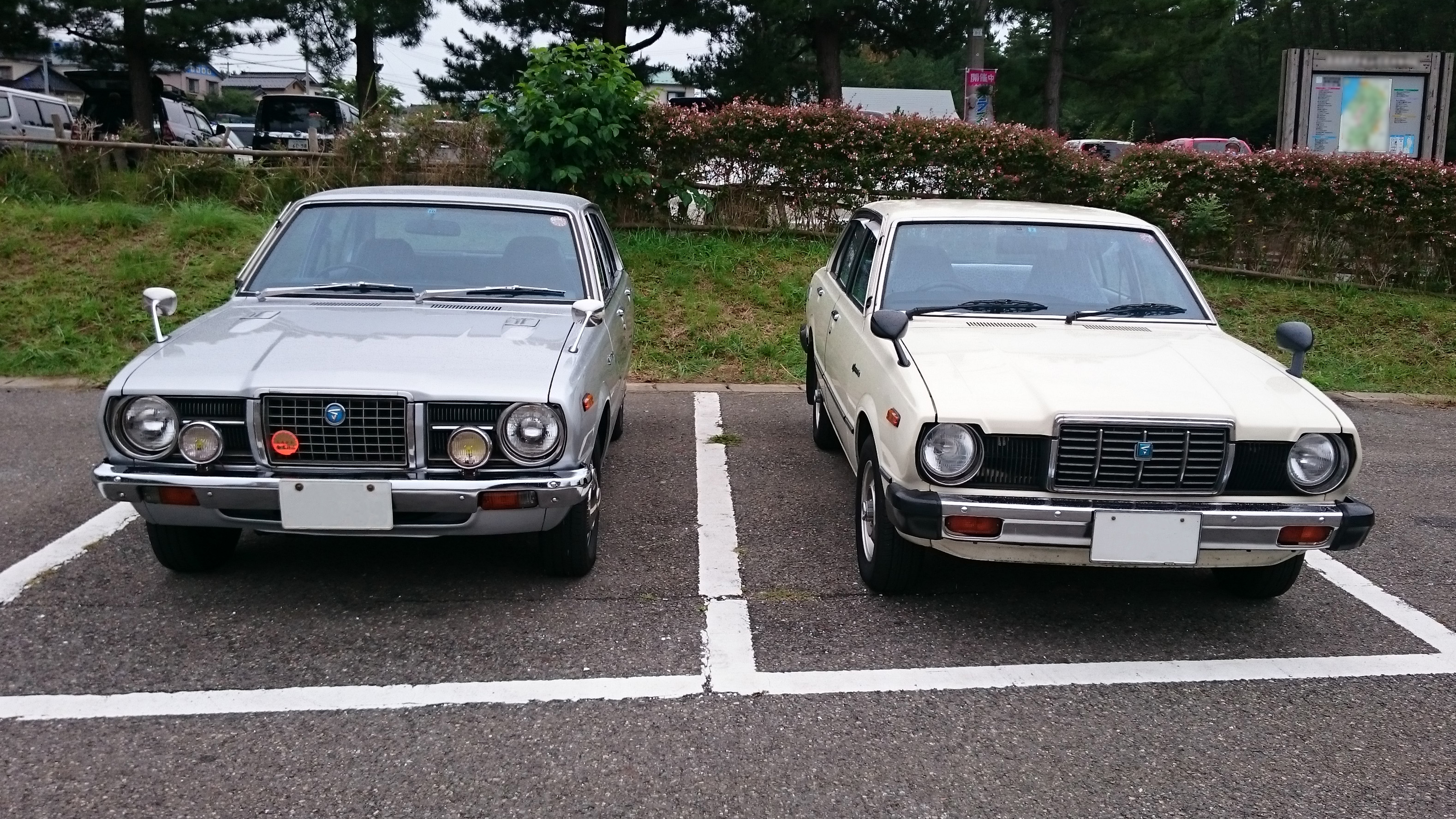
Pre-facelift Sprinter 1200 DX (KE40, left) and second facelift Sprinter 1300 DX (KE65, right) sedans

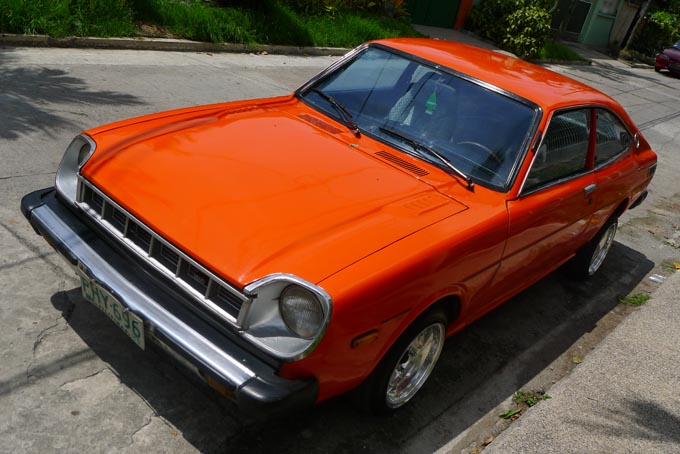
Sprinter 1600 XL coupé (TE62, pre-facelift)

== Fourth generation (E70; 1979) ==
Fourth generation
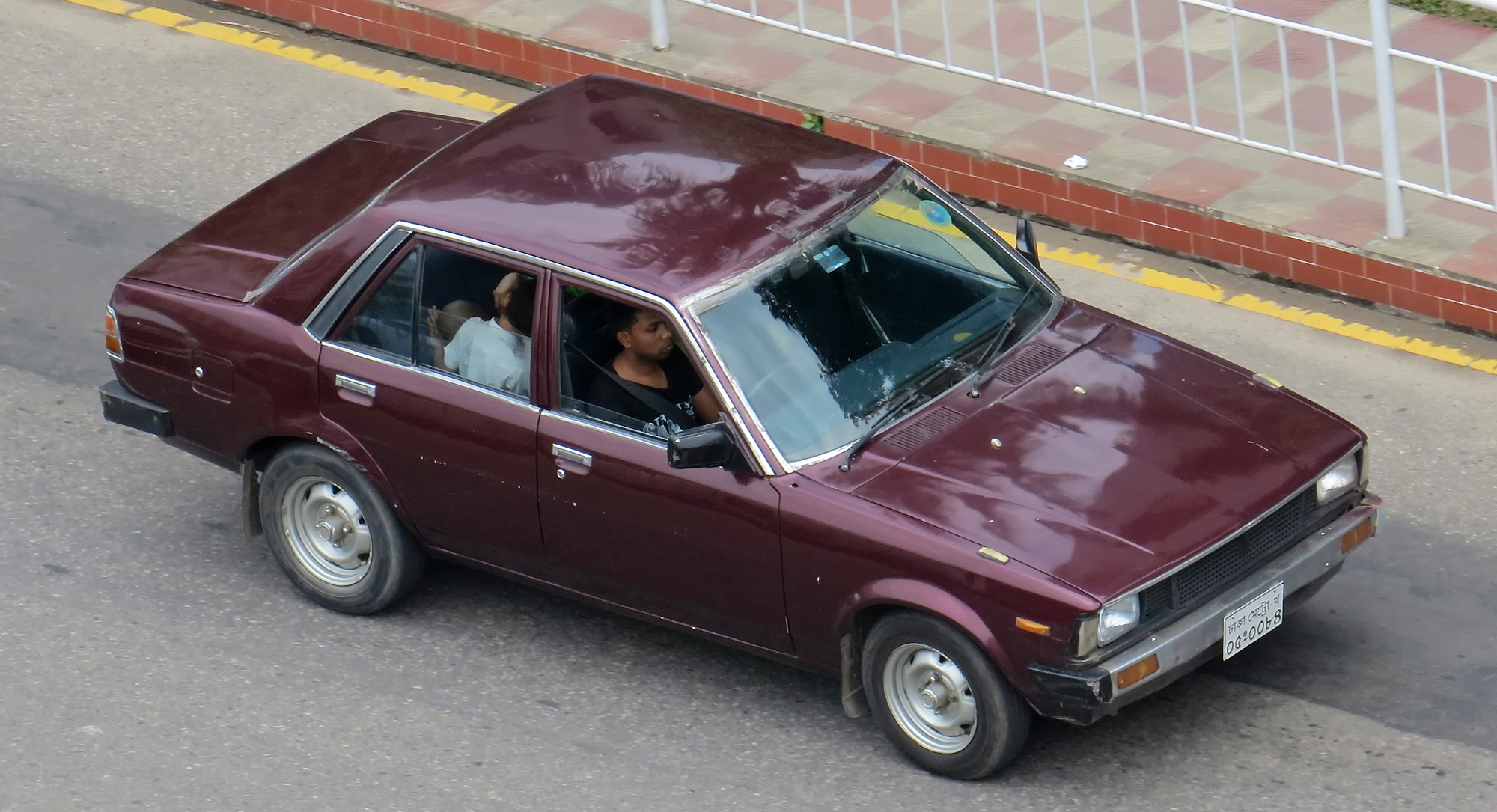
- Sprinter 1300 DX sedan (KE70, pre-facelift)

Overview
- Model code: E70
- Production: 1979–1983
- Assembly: Japan: Takaoka Plant, Toyota City; Japan: Higashi-Fuji plant, Susono, Shizuoka (Kanto Auto Works)

Body and chassis
- Body style: 2-door hardtop coupé; 3-door liftback coupé; 3-door hardtop liftback; 4-door sedan
- Layout: Front engine, rear-wheel drive
- Related: Toyota Corolla (E70); Daihatsu Charmant (A35/55); Toyota Sprinter Trueno/Corolla Levin (TE71)/AE85/AE86)

Powertrain
- Engine: Petrol: 1.3 L 4K-U I4 (KE70); 1.5 L 3A-U I4 (AE70); 1.6 L 2T-GEU DOHC I4 (TE71); 1.8 L 13T-U I4 (TE70); Diesel: 1.8 L 1C I4 (CE70)
- Transmission: 2-speed A20 automatic; 3-speed A30/40/41 automatic; 4-speed A42D automatic; 4-speed K40/T40 manual; 5-speed K50/T50/W51 manual

Dimensions
- Wheelbase: 2,400 mm (94.5 in)
- Length: 4,050–4,225 mm (159.4–166.3 in) (sedan); 4,070 mm (160.2 in) (coupé); 4,120–4,225 mm (162.2–166.3 in) (coupé/hardtop/liftback)
- Width: 1,625 mm (64.0 in)
- Height: 1,325 mm (52.2 in) (coupé); 1,330 mm (52.4 in) (hardtop/liftback); 1,385 mm (54.5 in) (sedan)
- Curb weight: 805–975 kg (1,774.7–2,149.5 lb)

The 1979 fourth generation Sprinter was based on the fourth generation Corolla coupé, 2-door hardtop, 4-door sedan, and 3-door liftback, without the 2-door sedan and wagon/van variants again. As before, the differences were cosmetic — the Corollas had a simpler treatment of the grille, head lights and tail lights while the Sprinter used a slightly more complex, sculpted treatment. The 1.4 T engine was replaced by a bigger 1.5 L 3A-U, and a 1.6 L fuel injected 2T-GEU engine became available for every body styles as GT variants (except the coupé, badged as "Trueno"). In August 1979, a 1.8 L 13T-U petrol engine was introduced.

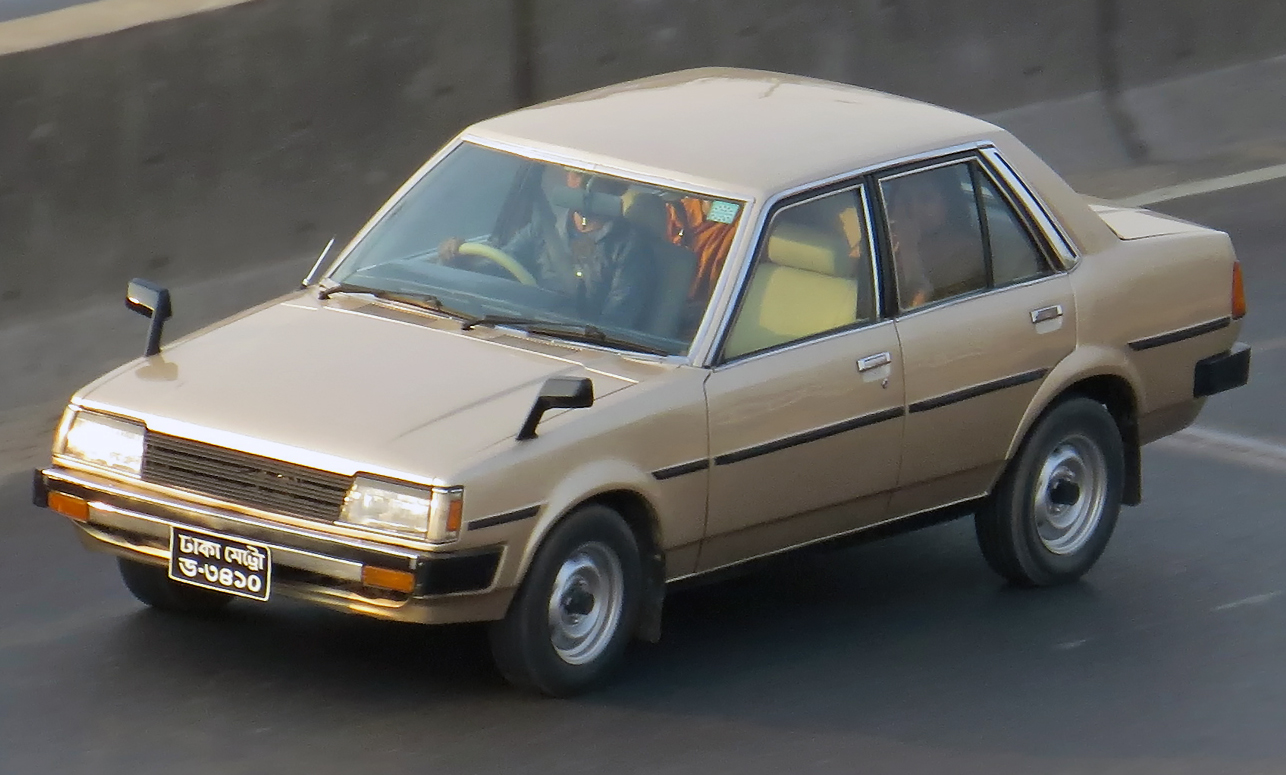

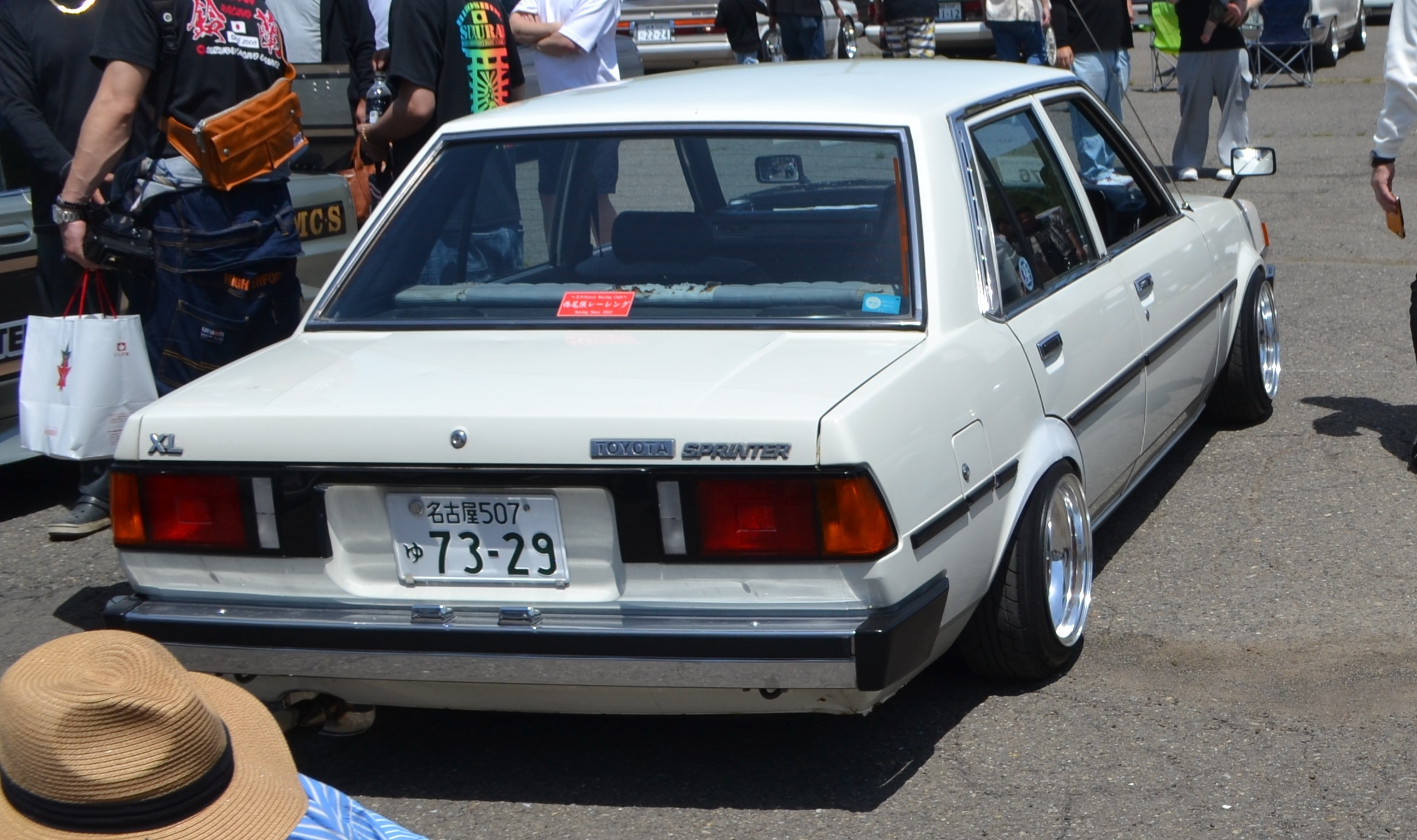
Sprinter 1300 sedan (KE70, facelift)

The Sprinter received a facelift with a wedge-shaped nose in August 1981. The front end of this facelift model was later reused for the facelift model of Australian (1983–1985) and European (1983–1987 wagon) markets E70 Corolla. The obsolete 2-speed automatic transmission for 1.3 L 4K-U engine was replaced by a 3-speed unit and also the 1.8 L 13T-U engine was discontinued due to poor sales. In February 1982, the 1.8 L engine was reintroduced for sedan only, but as diesel engine called 1C, which was the first diesel engine for the Sprinter/Corolla range and could be paired with a 4-speed automatic transmission option.

== Fifth generation (E80; 1983) ==
Fifth generation
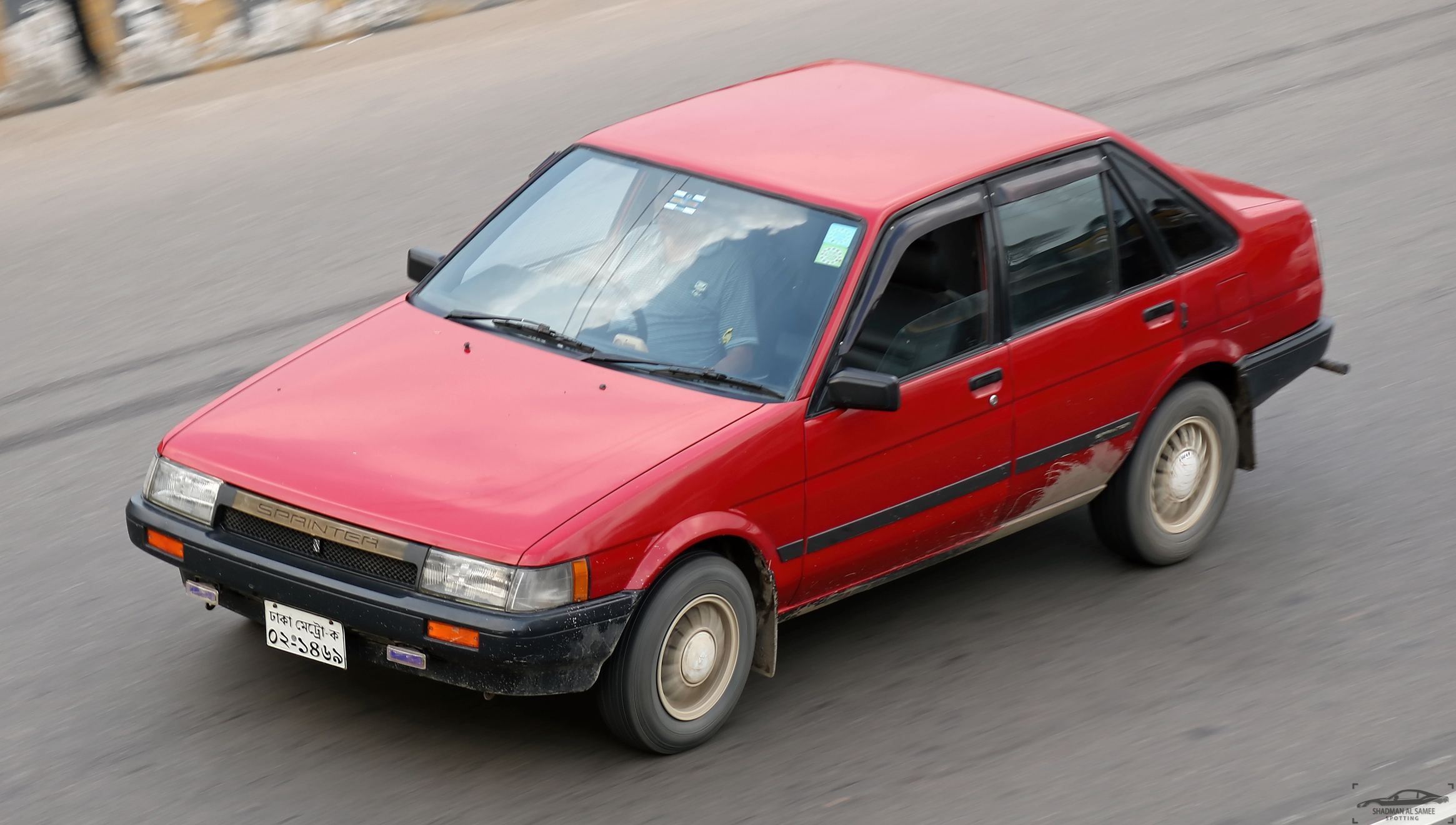
- Sprinter 1.5 SE sedan (AE81, pre-facelift)

Overview
- Model code: E80
- Also called: Chevrolet Nova
- Production: 1983–1987
- Assembly: Japan: Takaoka Plant, Toyota City; Japan: Higashi-Fuji plant, Susono, Shizuoka (Kanto Auto Works)

Body and chassis
- Body style: 4-door sedan; 5-door liftback
- Layout: Front engine, front-wheel drive
- Related: Toyota Corolla (E80)

Powertrain
- Engine: Petrol: 1.3 L 2E-LU I4 (EE80); 1.3 L 2A-LU I4 (AE80); 1.5 L 3A-LU I4 (AE81); 1.6 L 4A-LEU I4 (AE82); 1.6 L 4A-GELU DOHC I4 (AE82); Diesel: 1.8 L 1C-L I4 (CE80)
- Transmission: 3-speed A132L automatic; 4-speed A240L automatic; 4-speed C40 manual; 5-speed C50/52/S50 manual

Dimensions
- Wheelbase: 2,430 mm (95.7 in)
- Length: 4,155 mm (163.6 in)
- Width: 1,635 mm (64.4 in)
- Height: 1,380 mm (54.3 in)
- Curb weight: 820–960 kg (1,807.8–2,116.4 lb)

The fifth generation Sprinter was based on the 1983 fifth generation E80 Corolla range. Like the Corolla, the model line was split into FWD and RWD models.

Unlike the 5-door liftback which had minimum exterior differences, the E80 Sprinter sedan was designed with different sheet metal on the rear part. It got two additional windows on the C-pillars and different tail lamps which was placed a little higher due to the higher boot position. The 3/5-door "FX" hatchbacks were not available for Sprinter. From this generation forward, the 2-door coupé and 3-door liftback body styles were now exclusive to the Sprinter Trueno/Corolla Levin range.

In October 1984, a high performance GT model was added to the line up and only available as sedan. It was powered by a 1.6 L DOHC 16-valve 4A-GELU engine, the same engine that was similar to the 1.6 L 4A-GEU engine that powered the popular AE86 Sprinter Trueno/Corolla Levin. Minor facelifts occurred with new exterior styling in May 1985. The 1.3 L 2A-LU and 1.6 L 4A-ELU engines were also discontinued, with the former being replaced by the 12-valve 1.3 L 2E-LU engine.

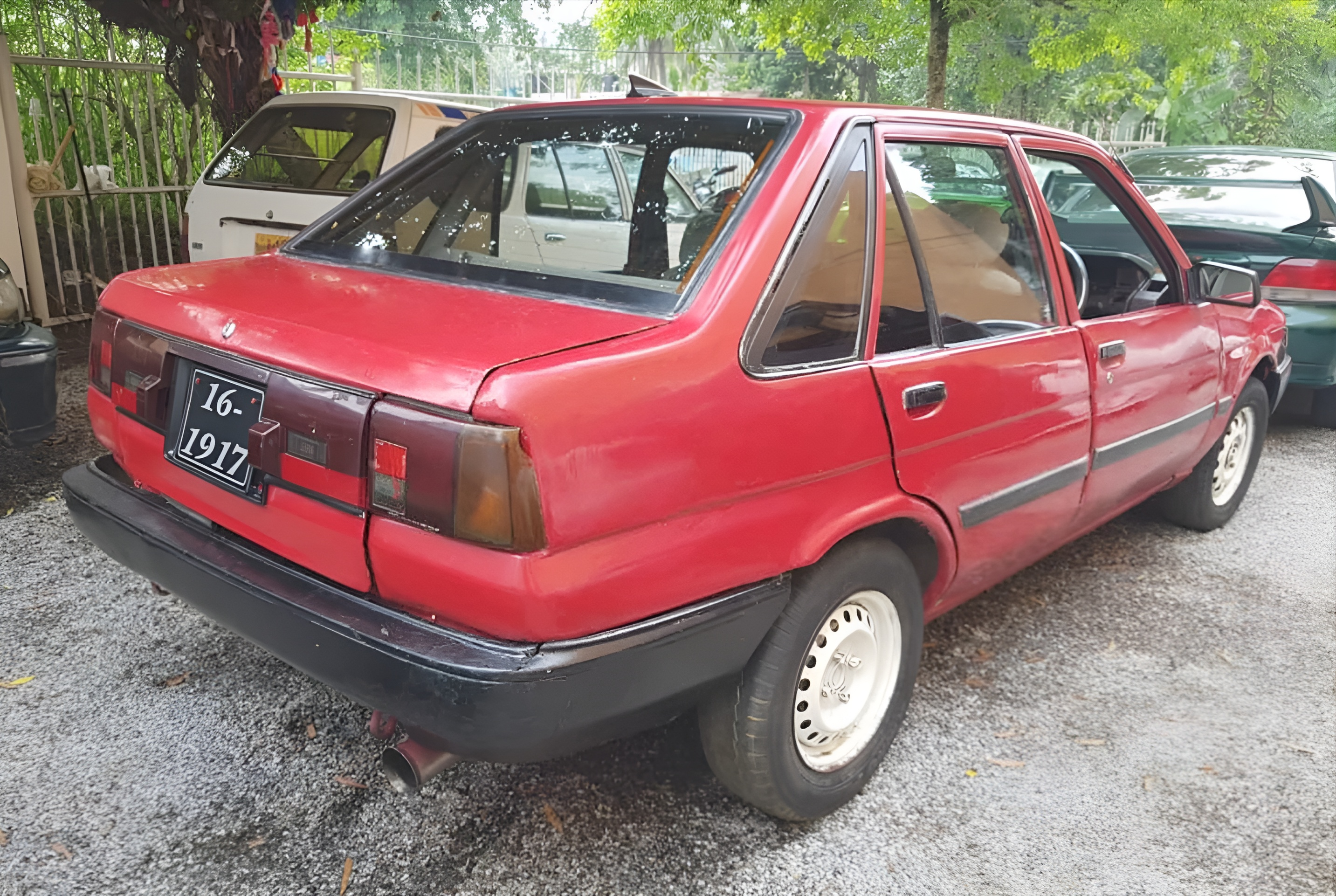
Sprinter 1.5 SE sedan (AE81, pre-facelift)
Note: the boot garnish is from the facelifted model.

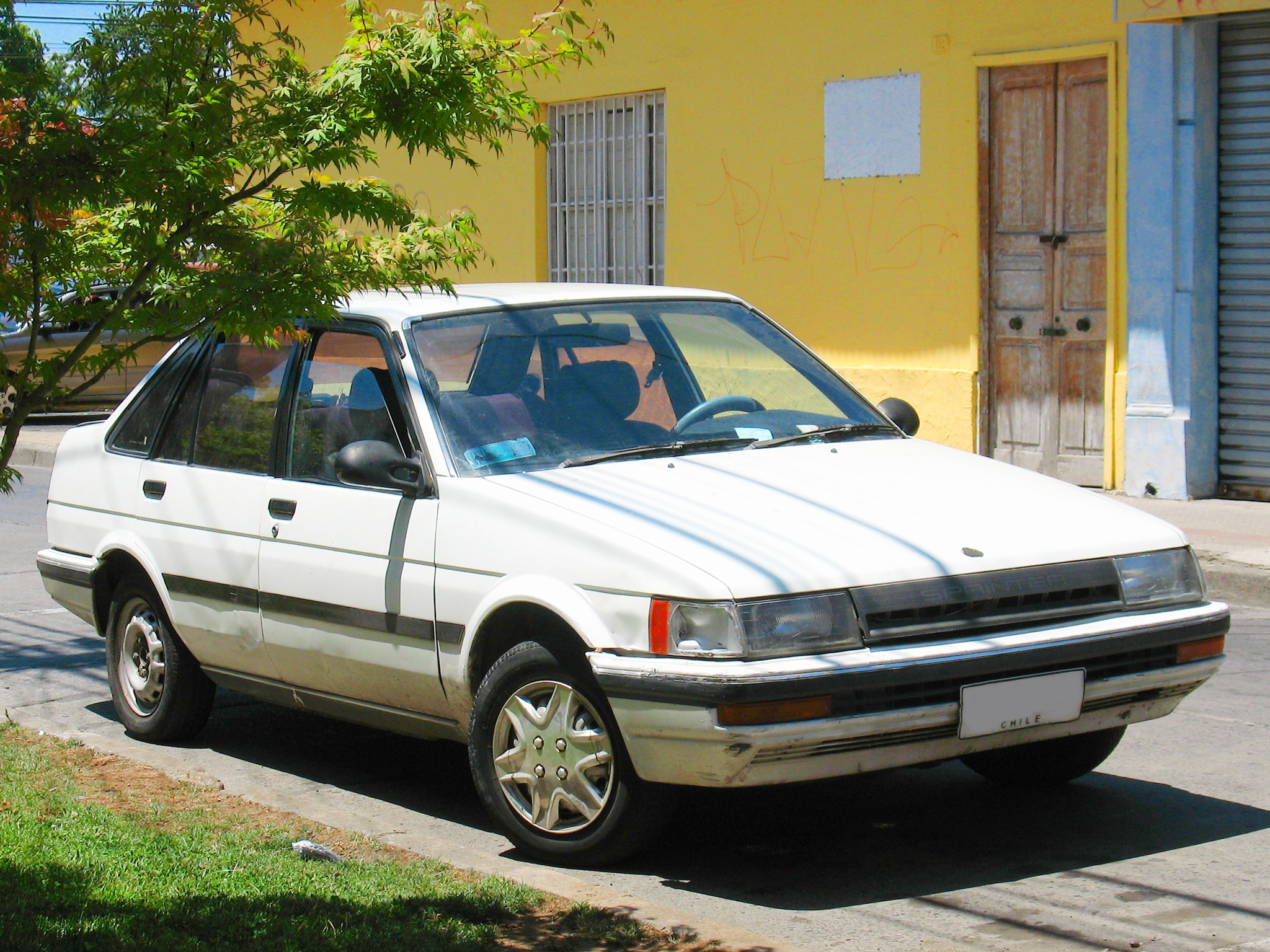
Sprinter 1.3 SE sedan (EE80, facelift)

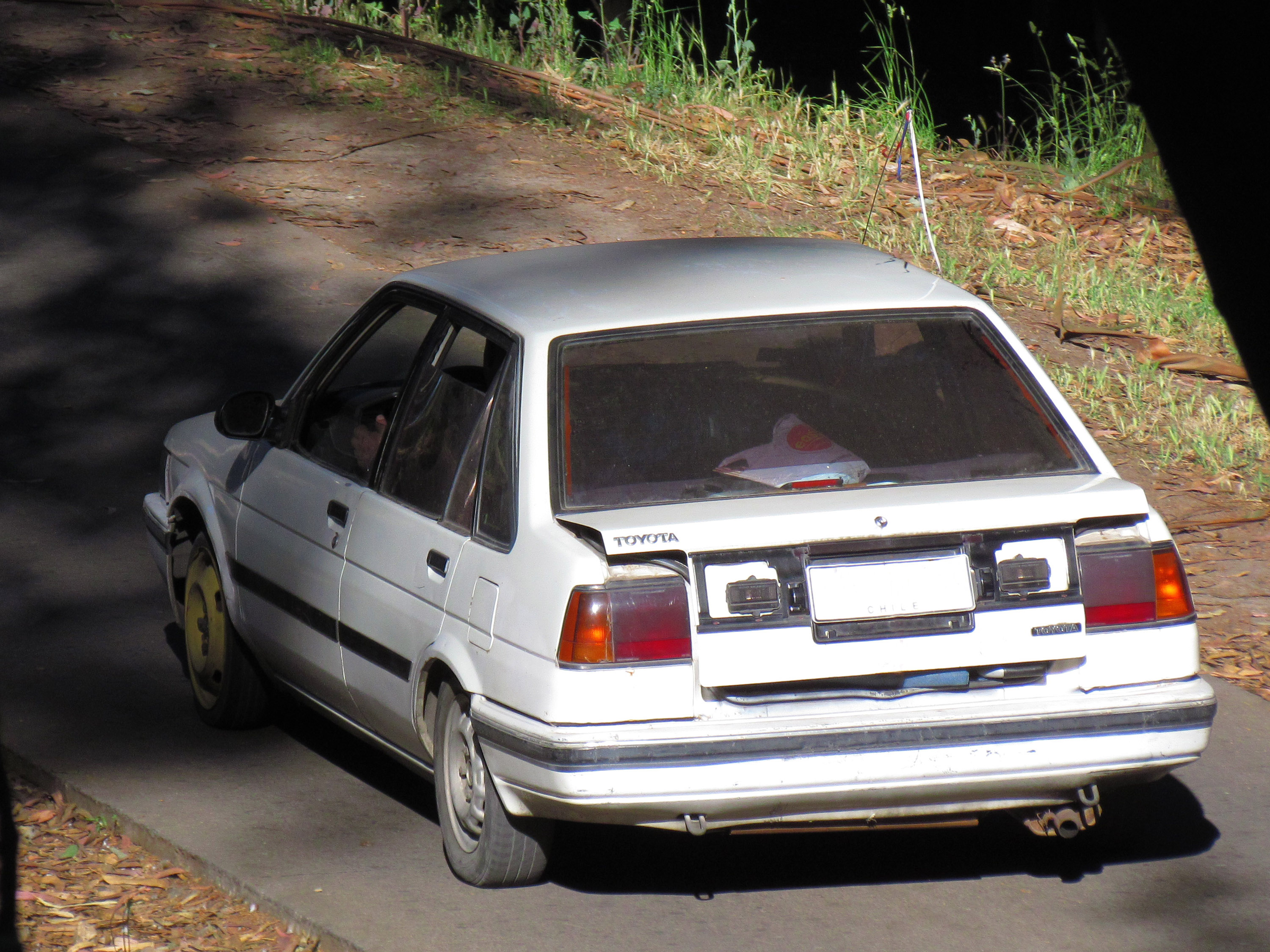
Rear view (facelift)

The four-door sedan and the five-door liftback were also manufactured in Fremont, California and sold for the North American market under the resurrected name of Chevrolet Nova, the first of several Toyotas built by General Motors known as their S-platform under license at NUMMI.

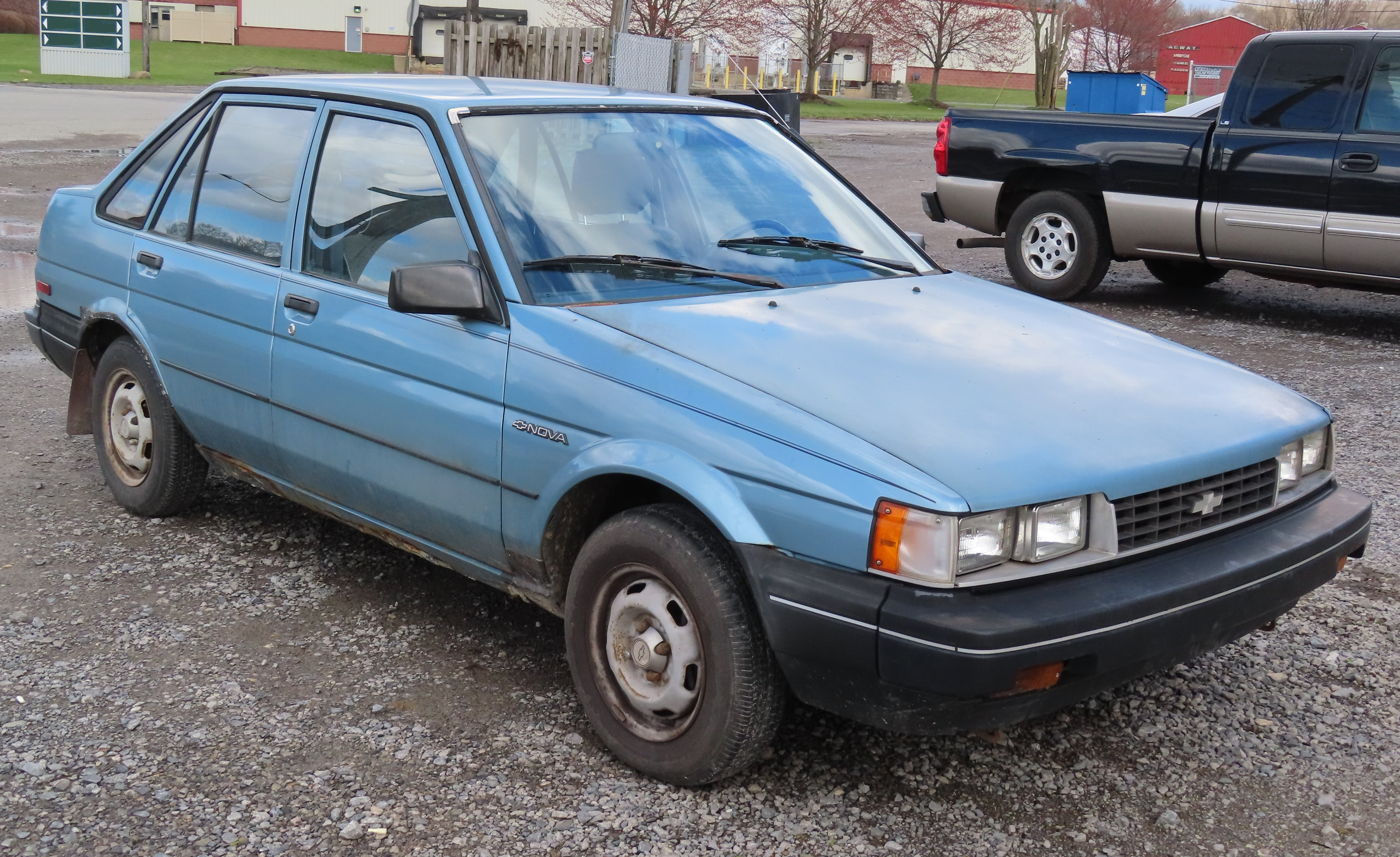
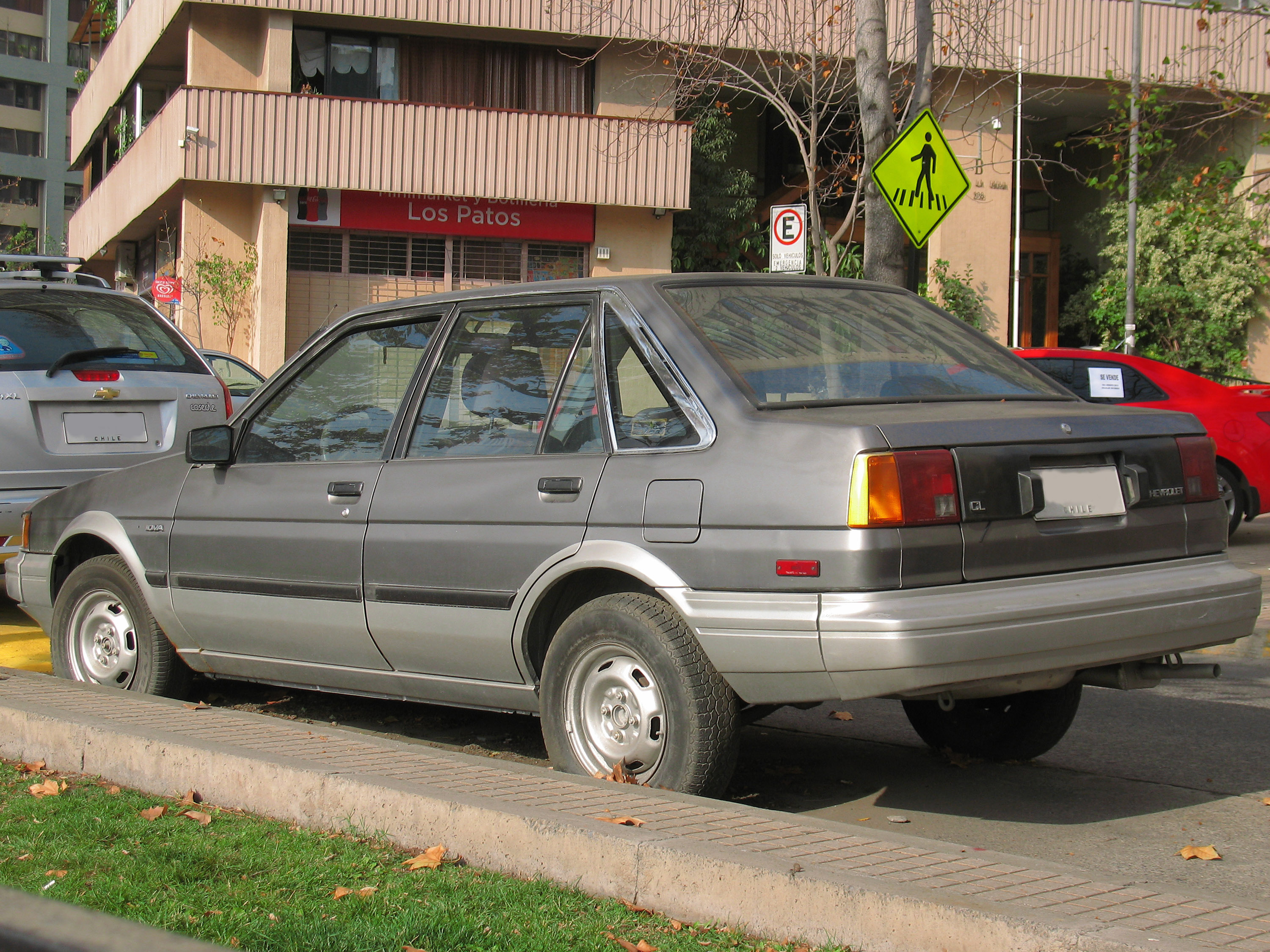
North American market Chevrolet Nova, using the Sprinter body shell.

== Sixth generation (E90; 1987) ==
Sixth generation
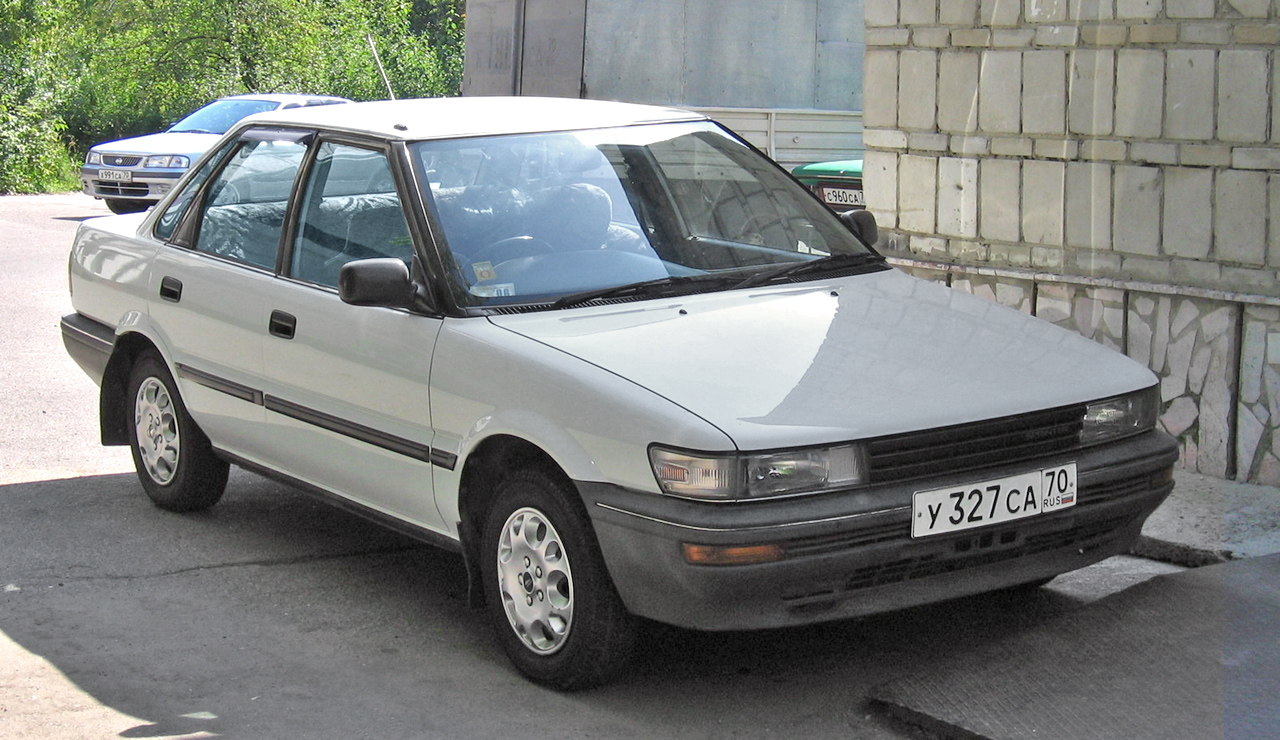
- Toyota Sprinter 1.3 LX sedan (EE90, pre-facelift)

Overview
- Model code: E90
- Also called: Geo Prizm (E90)
- Production: 1987–1991
- Assembly: Japan: Takaoka Plant, Toyota City; Japan: Higashi-Fuji plant, Susono, Shizuoka (Kanto Auto Works); Japan: Ōbu, Aichi (Toyota Industries)

Body and chassis
- Body style: 4-door sedan; 5-door liftback; 5-door wagon/van
- Layout: Front engine, front-wheel drive; Front engine, all-wheel drive (AE95)
- Related: Toyota Corolla (E90); Toyota Sprinter Trueno/Corolla Levin (AE91/92); Toyota Sprinter Carib/Corolla 4WD wagon (AE95G); Holden Nova (LE/LF)

Powertrain
- Engine: Petrol: 1.3 L 2E I4 (EE90/96V); 1.5 L 3E I4 (EE98V); 1.5 L 5A-F/FE/FHE I4 (AE91); 1.6 L 4A-F/FE I4 (AE92/95); 1.6 L 4A-GE DOHC I4 (AE92); Diesel: 1.8 L 1C-II/III I4 (CE90/96V); 2.0 L 2C-III I4 (CE95)
- Transmission: 3-speed A131L/A132L automatic; 4-speed A240L/A241H/A245E automatic; 4-speed C40 manual; 5-speed C50/C52/E55F5/E57F5/E59F/S50 manual

Dimensions
- Wheelbase: 2,430 mm (95.7 in)
- Length: 4,205 mm (165.6 in) (van); 4,225 mm (166.3 in) (sedan/liftback)
- Width: 1,655 mm (65.2 in)
- Height: 1,360–1,365 mm (53.5–53.7 in) (liftback); 1,360–1,380 mm (53.5–54.3 in) (sedan); 1,435 mm (56.5 in) (van)
- Curb weight: 880–1,130 kg (1,940.1–2,491.2 lb)

The sixth generation Sprinter was shared with the sixth generation E90 Corolla range, introduced in May 1987. The E90 series was the first generation with Full-time 4WD option. The Sprinter was offered as a 6-window sedan as before, 5-door liftback called Sprinter Cielo (Cielo means celestial or heavenly in Spanish; it was exported as the Corolla liftback) and a rebadged Corolla commercial van. The van was the first in the Sprinter history, although the Corolla also gained a passenger oriented wagon version as well. The Sprinter got more upmarket four-wheel drive wagon version called Sprinter Carib and exported as Corolla 4WD wagon.

The E90 sedan and "Cielo" liftback were introduced first in May 1987, with three petrol engine options; carburetted 1.3 L 2E, 1.5 L 5A-F and high performance fuel injected 1.6 L "red & black top" 4A-GE. A full-time AWD version of the sedan, powered by a 1.6 L 4A-F engine (AE95) was introduced later in October. Another Sprinter range was added to the line up in August 1988, with the additional commercial van model. This model had exclusive 1.5 L 3E petrol engine and 1.8 L 1C-II diesel engine as option.

The facelift arrived for Sprinter sedan and liftback in May 1989. The sedan also received 1.5 L fuel injected 5A-FE petrol engine from Cielo, 4A-FE from Sprinter Carib for AWD models and also a revised 1.8 L 1C-III diesel engines shared with the commercial van. The 1.6 L 4A-GE engine was also replaced by the "red top" version, boosting the power from 120 to 140 PS (88 to 103 kW; 118 to 138 bhp). Another engine options for sedan were introduced in August 1989, a new 5A-FHE engine for top FWD models and a 2.0 L 2C-III diesel engine for AWD models (CE95).

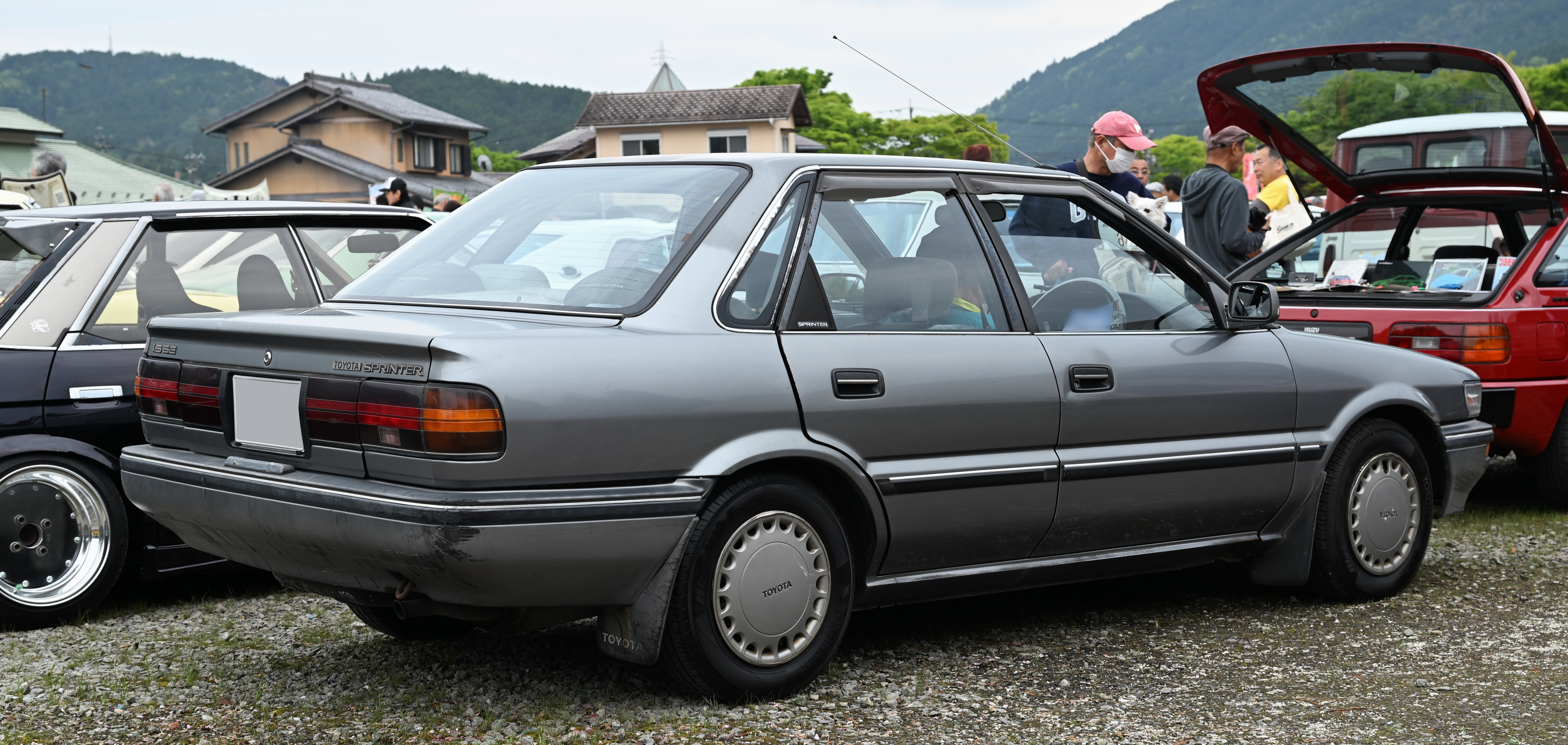
Sprinter 1.5 SE sedan (AE91, pre-facelift)

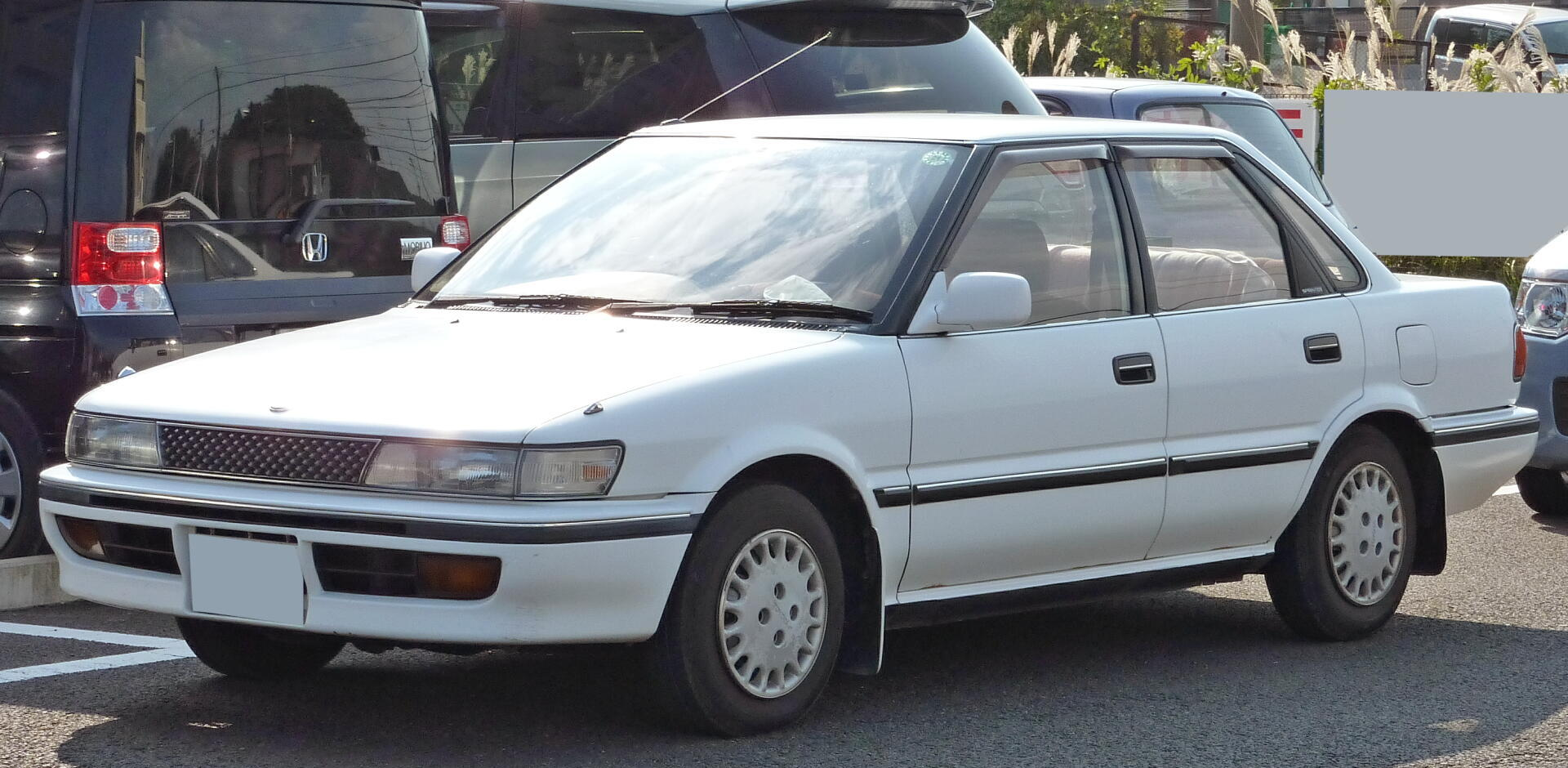
Sprinter 1.5 MX sedan (AE91, facelift)

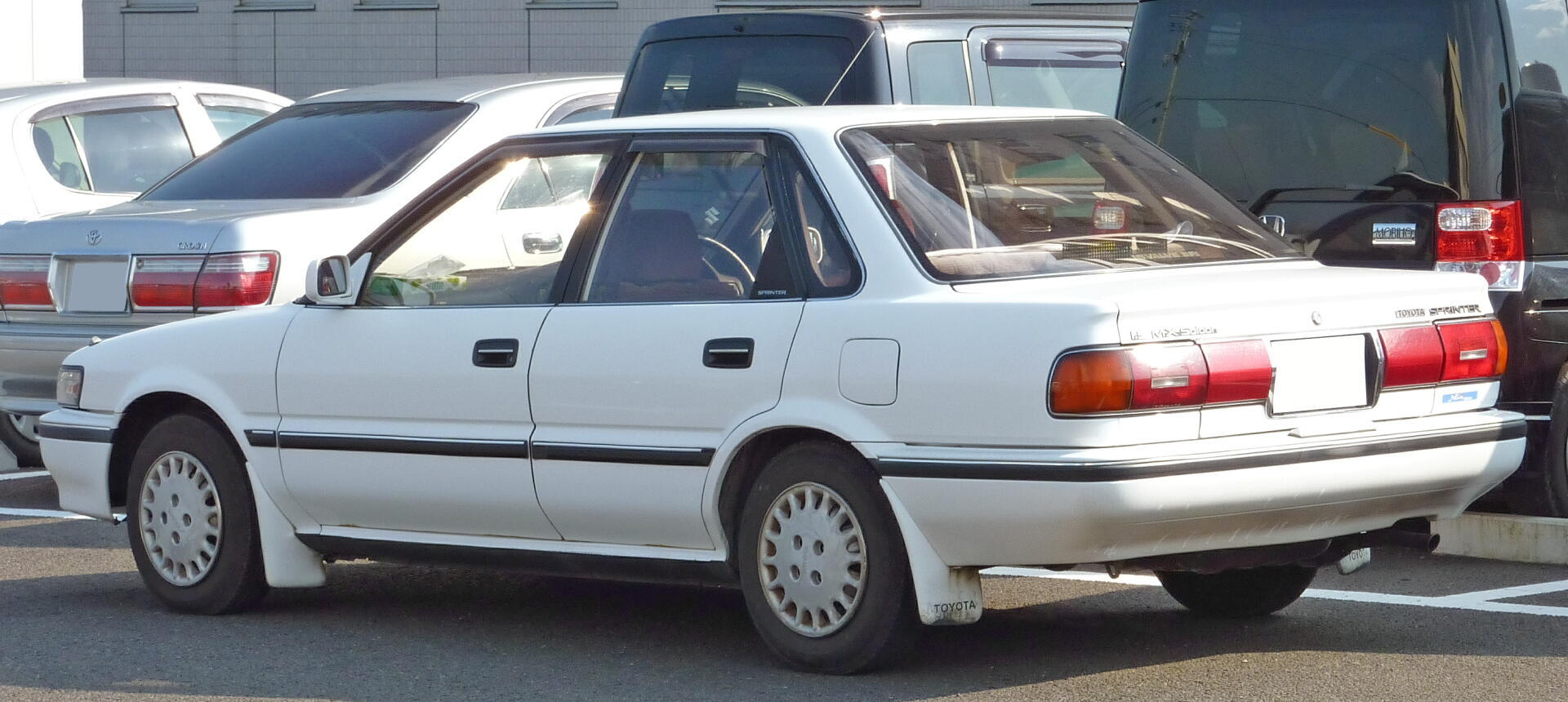
Sprinter 1.5 MX sedan (AE91, facelift)

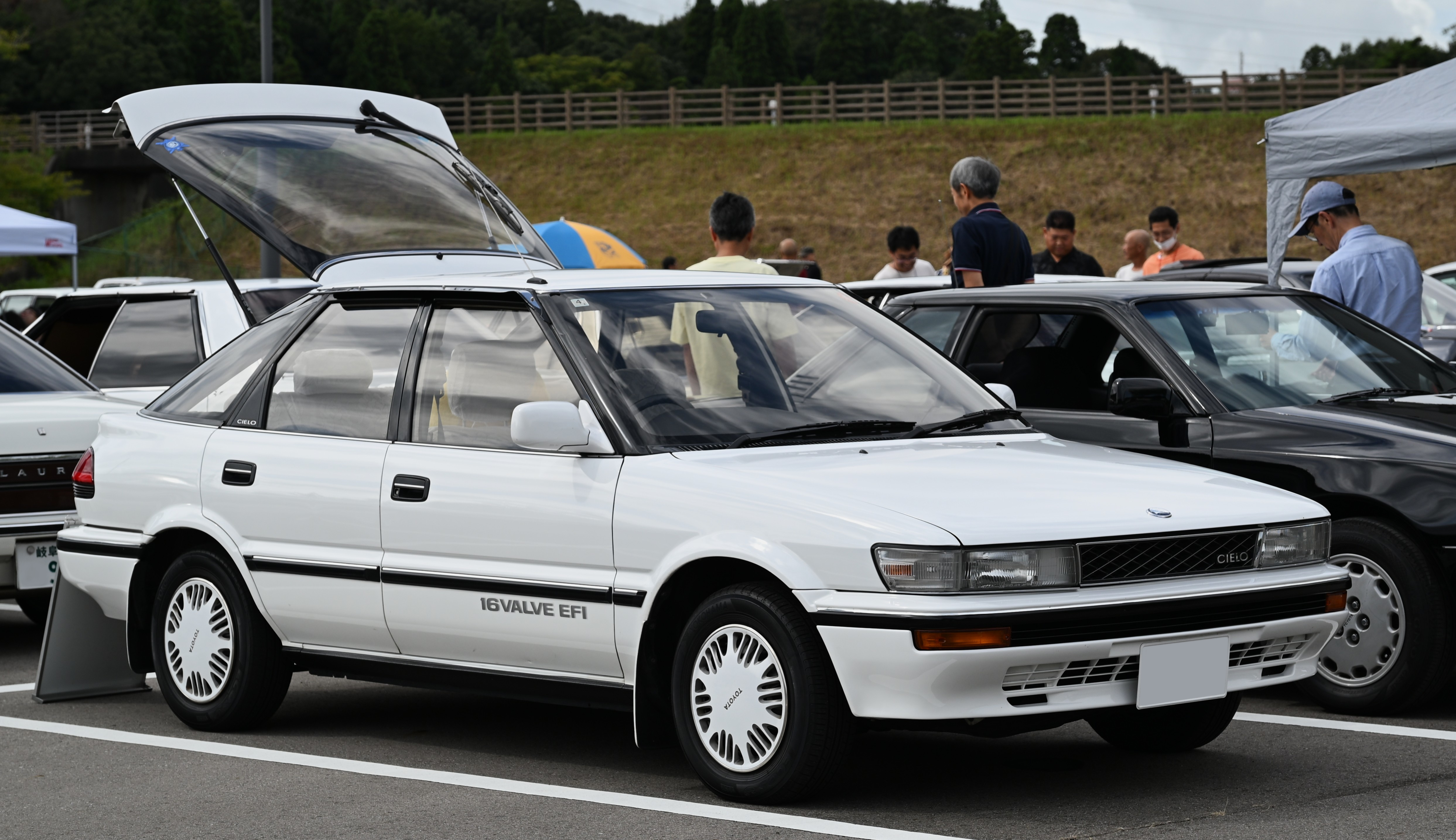
Sprinter Cielo 1.5 Xi liftback (AE91, pre-facelift)

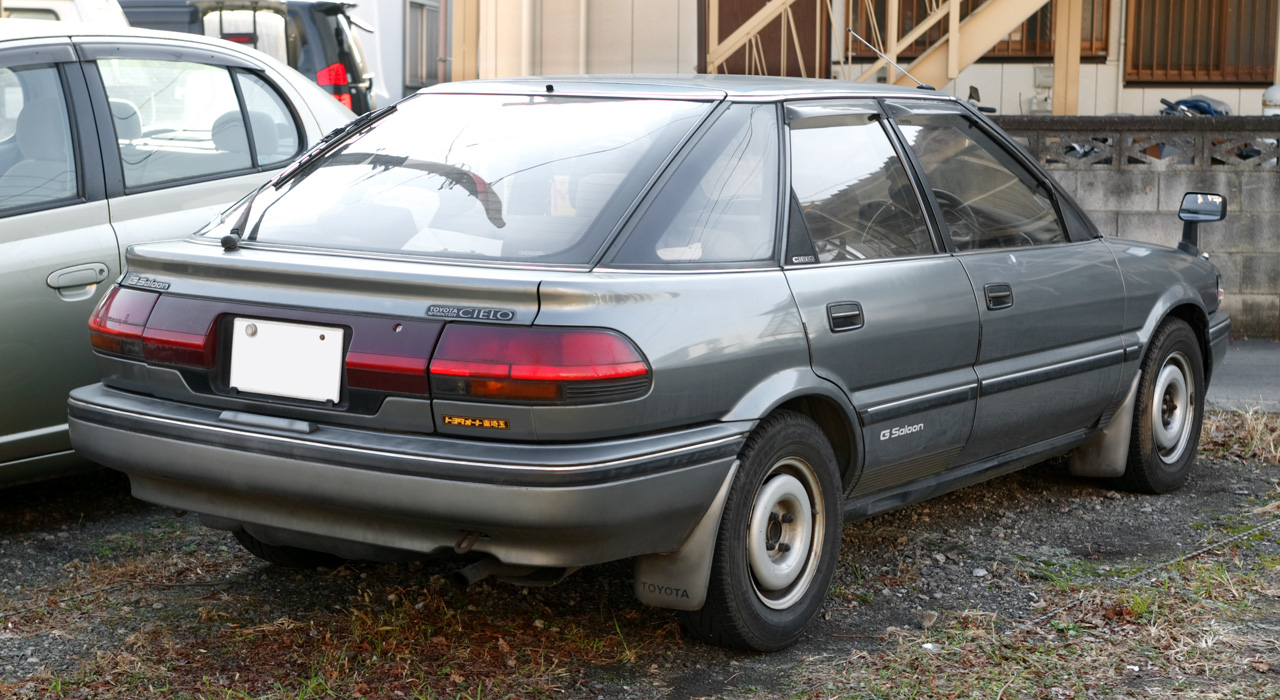
Rear view of Sprinter Cielo liftback

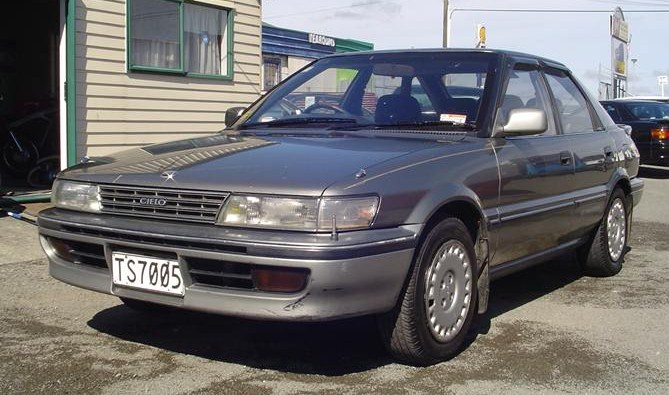
Sprinter Cielo 1.6 GT liftback (AE92, facelift)

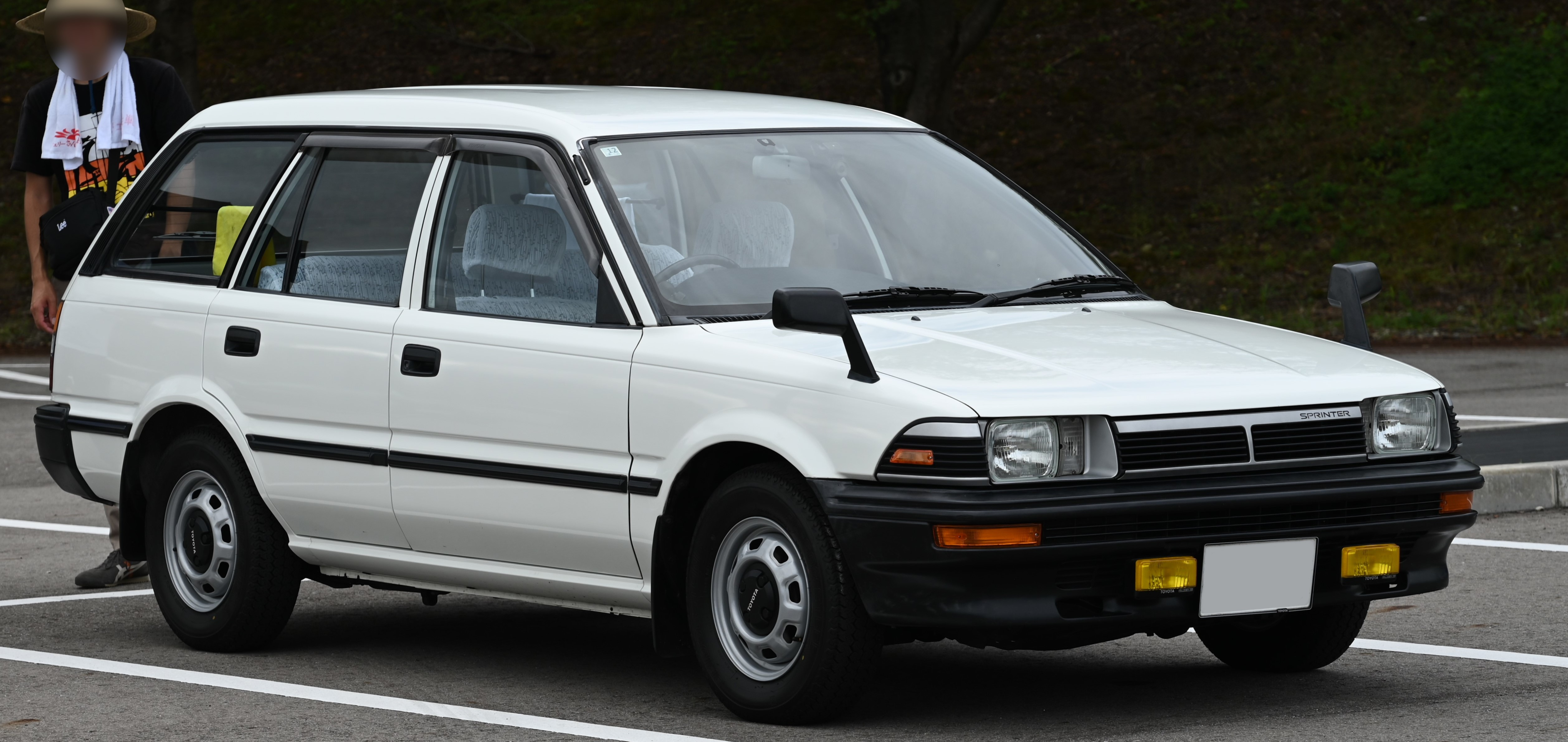
Sprinter 1.8D XL van (CE96V, pre-facelift)

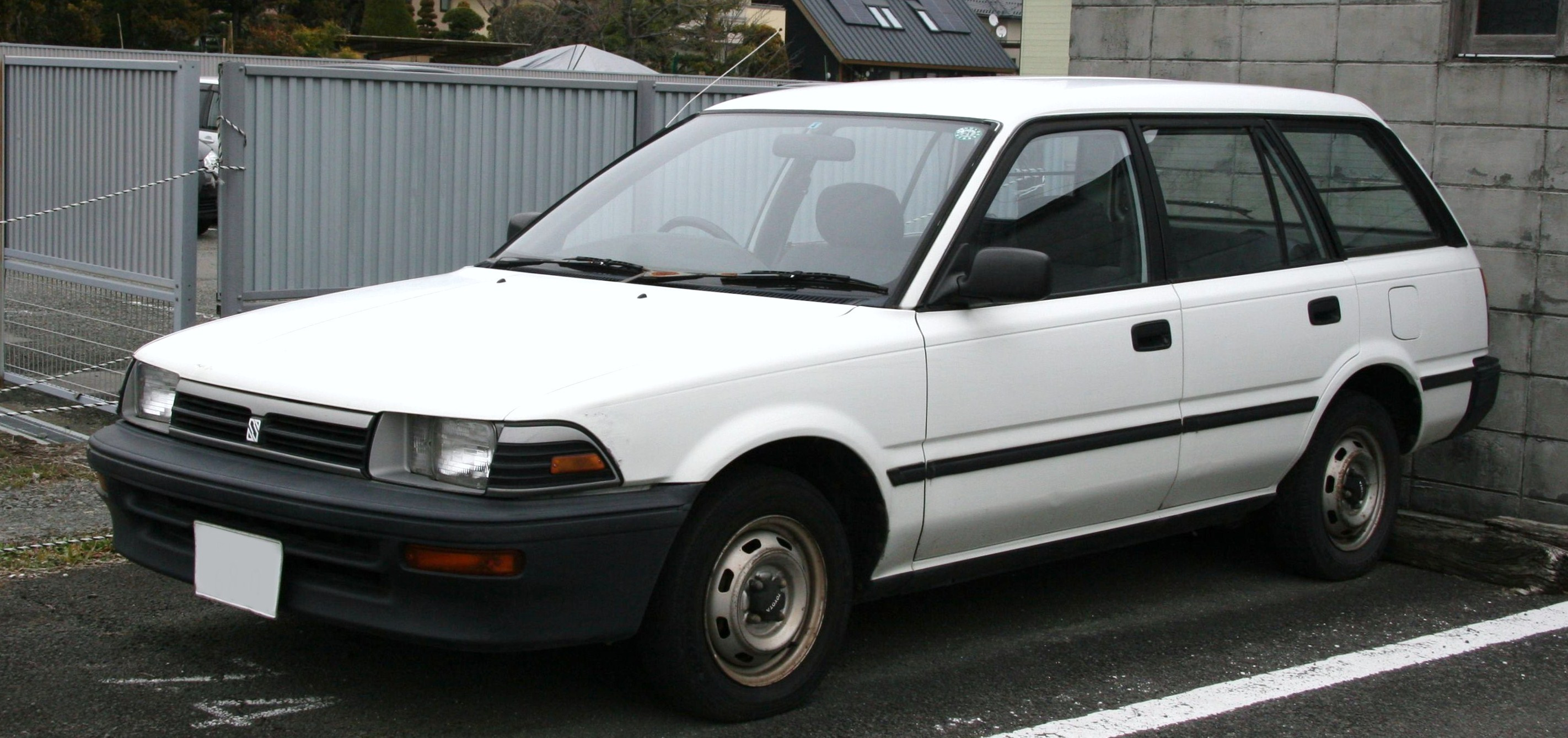
Sprinter 1.5 XL Extra van (EE96V, facelift)

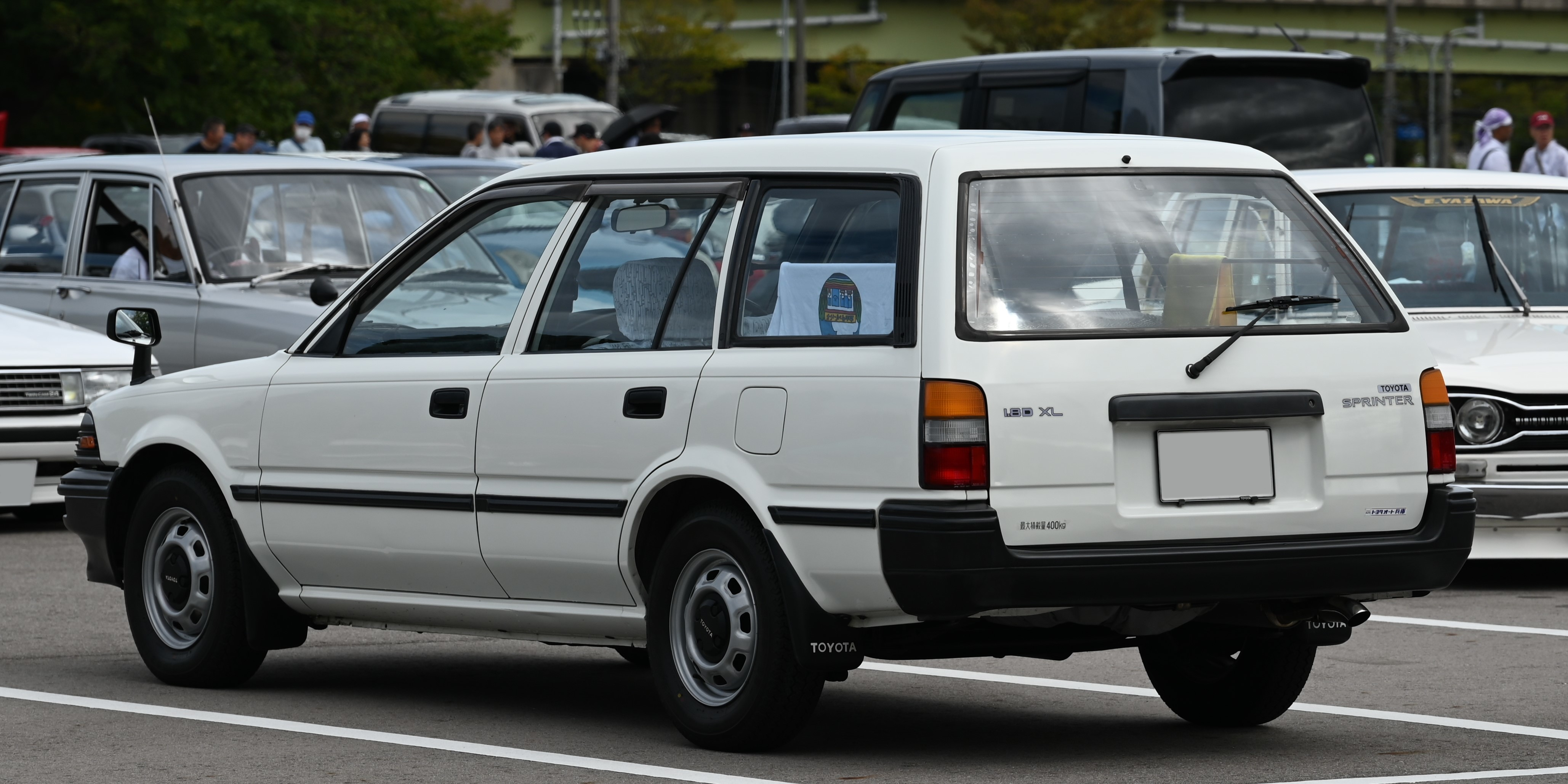
Rear view of Sprinter 1.8D XL van (CE96V)

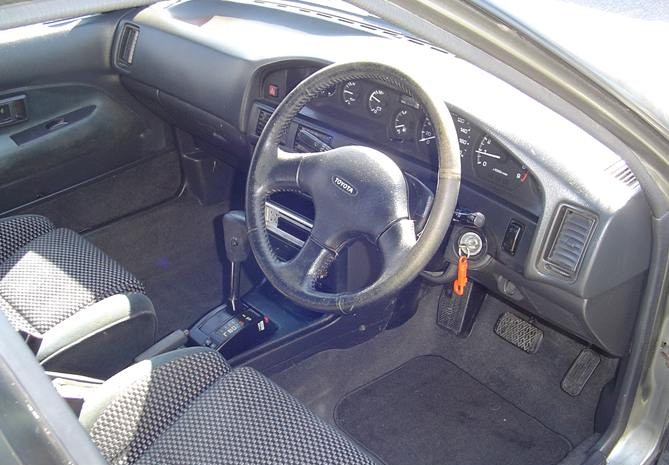
Interior (GT trim steering wheel)

Like the older E80 series-based Chevrolet Nova, the E90 series was also used as the basis of North American market Sprinter-based sedan and liftback with slightly different front end called the Geo Prizm.

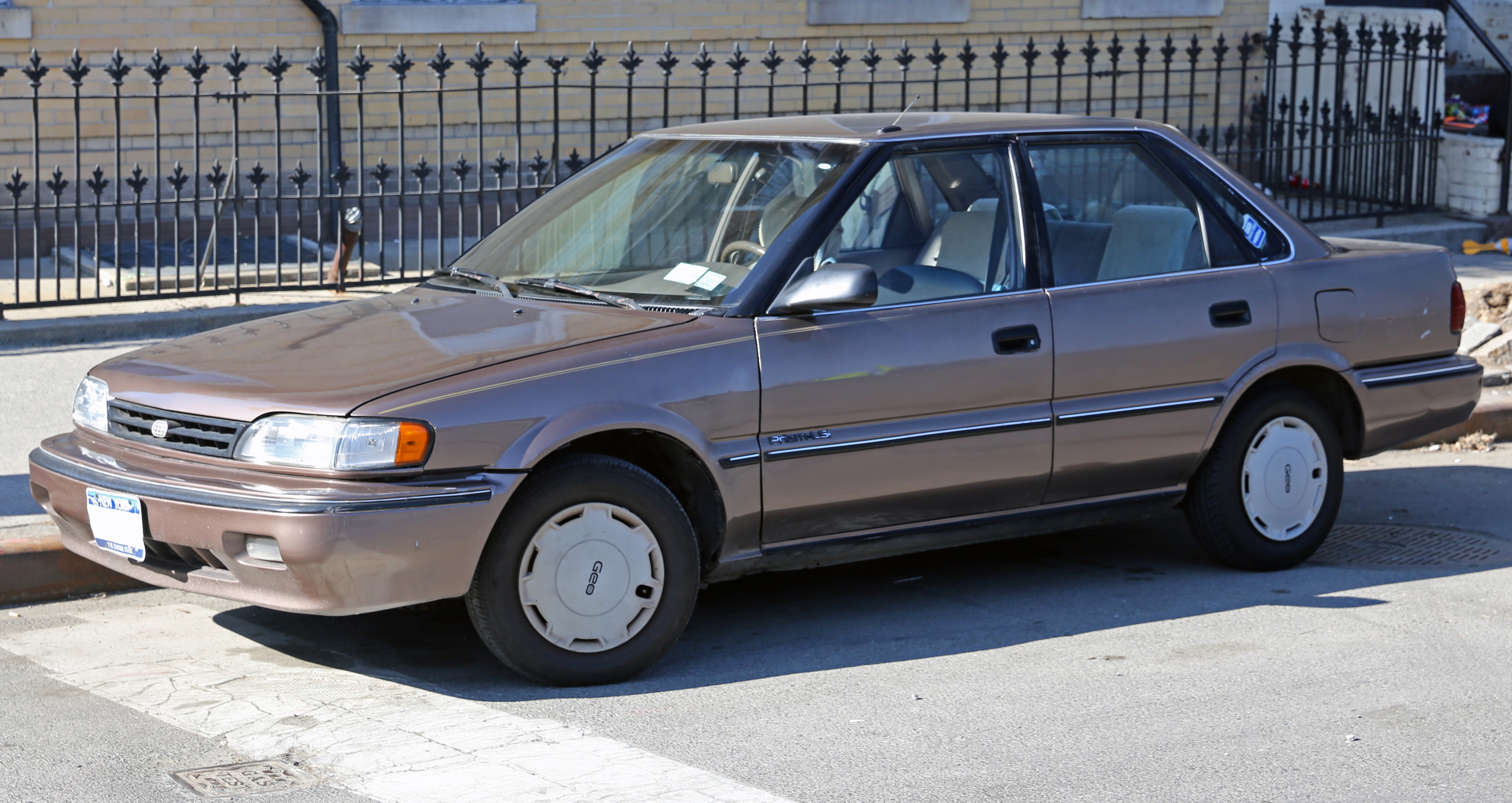
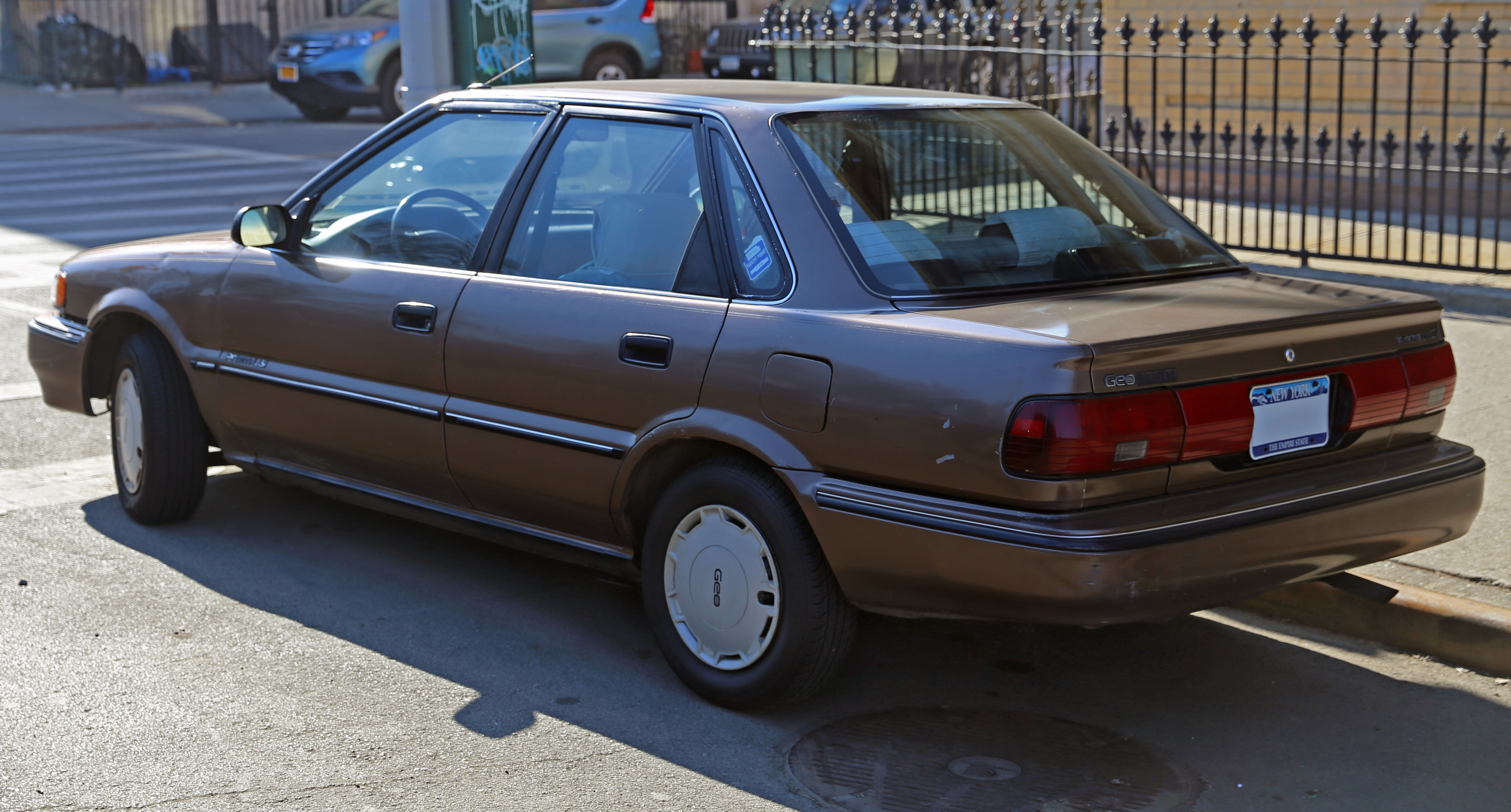
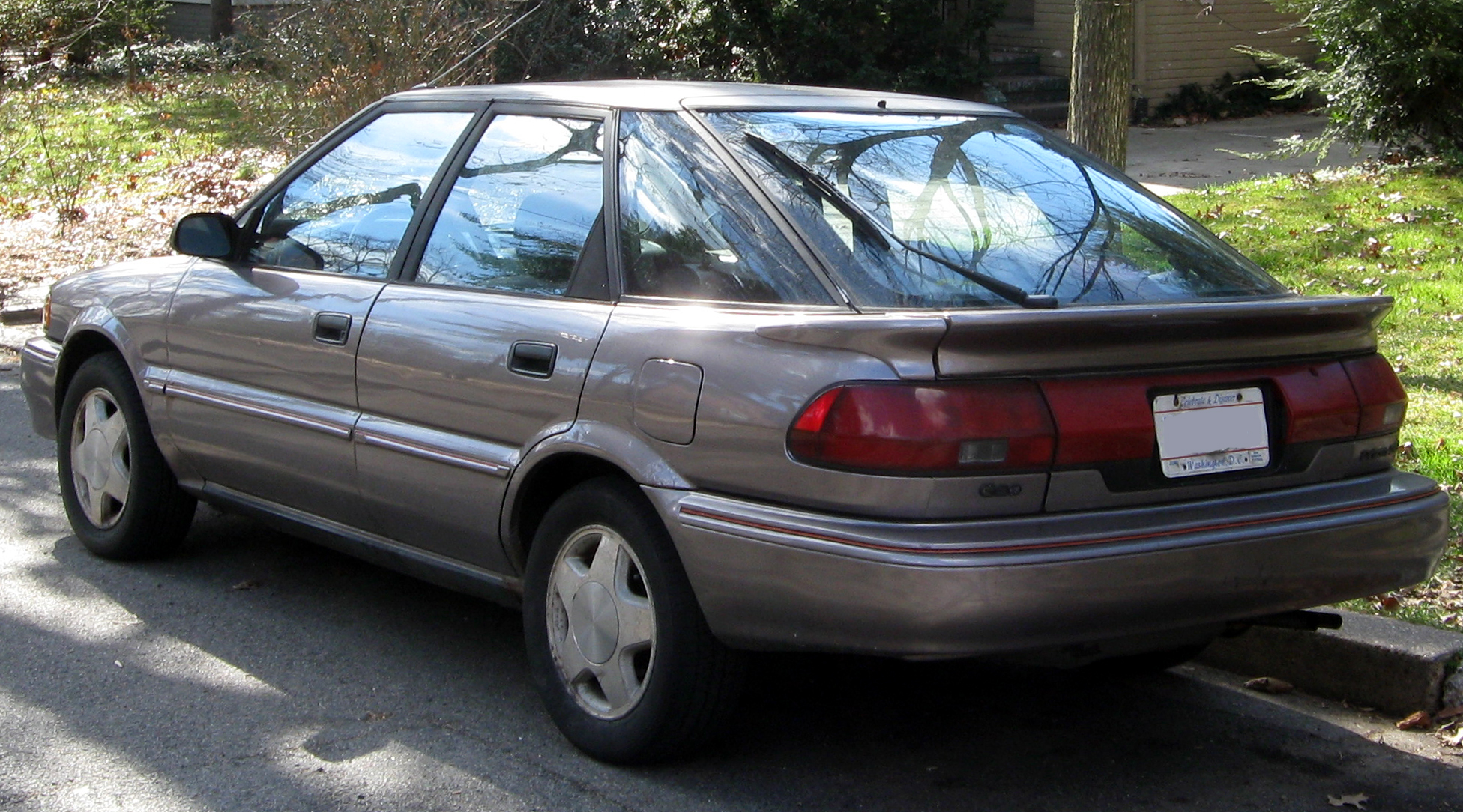
Sprinter sedan-based first generation North American market Geo Prizm sedan and liftback

== Seventh generation (E100; 1991) ==
Seventh generation
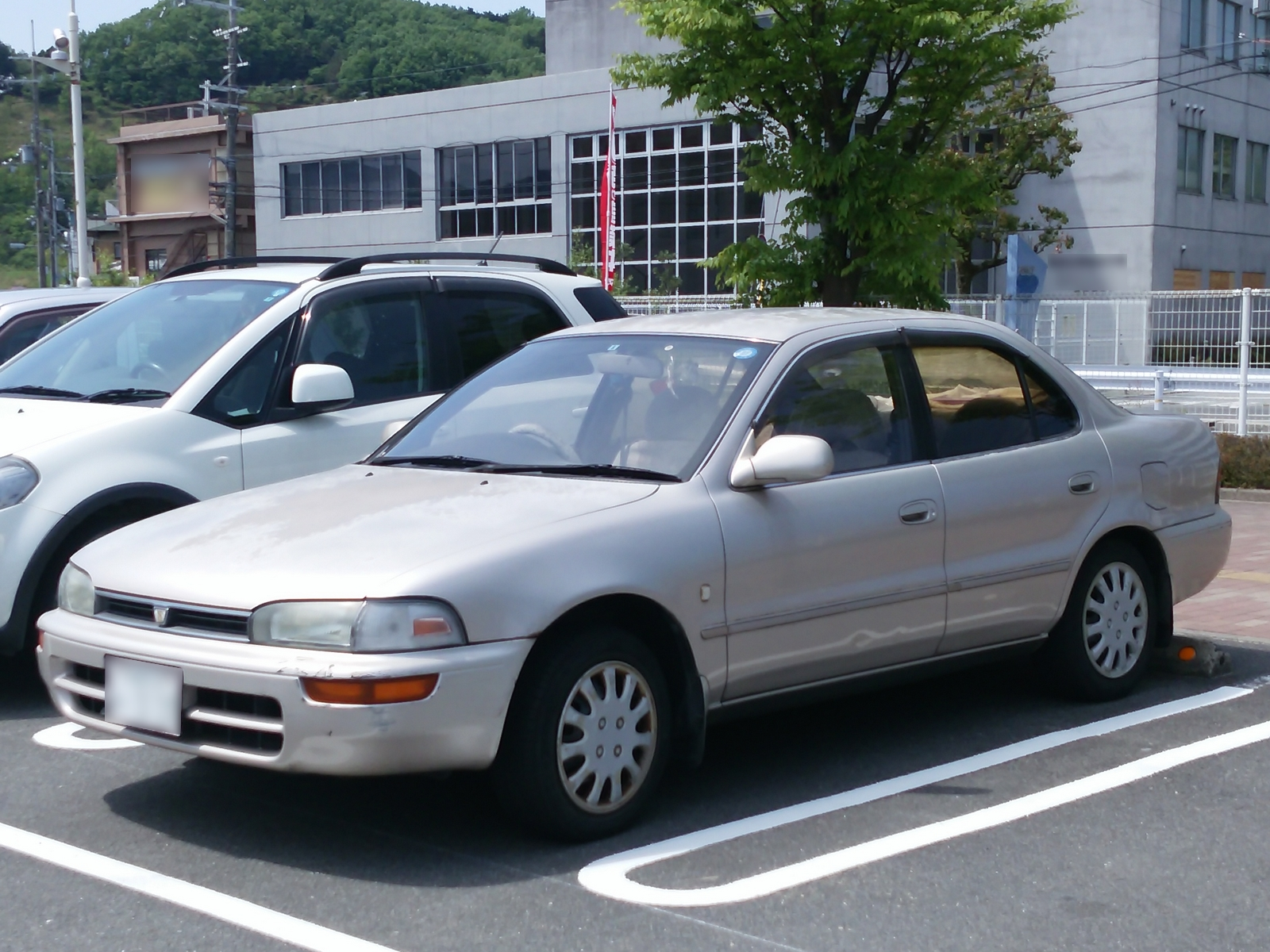
- Pre-facelift Toyota Sprinter 1.6 SE-G sedan (AE101, Japan)

Overview
- Model code: E100
- Also called: Geo Prizm (E100)
- Production: 1991–1995 (until 2002 for commercial wagons)
- Assembly: Japan: Takaoka Plant, Toyota City; Japan: Higashi-Fuji plant, Susono, Shizuoka (Kanto Auto Works); Japan: Ōbu, Aichi (Toyota Industries)

Body and chassis
- Body style: 4-door sedan; 5-door wagon/van
- Layout: Front engine, front-wheel drive; Front engine, all-wheel drive (AE104/AE109V/CE104/CE105V/CE109V)
- Related: Toyota Corolla (E100); Toyota Sprinter Trueno/Corolla Levin (AE100/101); Toyota Sprinter Marino/Corolla Ceres; Holden Nova (LG)

Powertrain
- Engine: Petrol: 1.3 L 4E-FE I4 (EE101/102V); 1.3 L 2E I4 (EE106V); 1.5 L 3E I4 (EE107V/108G); 1.5 L 5E-FE I4 (EE103V/104G); 1.5 L 5A-FE I4 (AE100); 1.6 L 4A-FE I4 (AE101/104/109V); 1.6 L 4A-GE 20-valve I4 (AE101); Diesel: 2.0 L 2C-III I4 (CE100/104/106V/108G/109V); 2.2 L 3C-E I4 (CE102G/105V/107V)
- Transmission: 3-speed A131L/A132L automatic; 4-speed A240E/A240L/A241H/A241L/A245E automatic; 4-speed C40 manual; 5-speed C50/C56/E55F5/E59F/S50/S51 manual

Dimensions
- Wheelbase: 2,465 mm (97.0 in)
- Length: 4,260 mm (167.7 in) (wagon); 4,290 mm (168.9 in) (sedan)
- Width: 1,685 mm (66.3 in)
- Height: 1,370–1,390 mm (53.9–54.7 in) (sedan); 1,435–1,455 mm (56.5–57.3 in) (wagon)
- Curb weight: 940–1,190 kg (2,072.3–2,623.5 lb)

The seventh generation Sprinter was introduced in June 1991. Unlike the prior generation, the body shell was developed to employ pressed doors style than the regular doors on Corolla and also the deletion of the extra windows on the C-pillar. A 5-door liftback was also developed as the new Sprinter Cielo, but it was never available in Japan due to the low sales of the previous generation. The liftback was later exported to Europe and Australia as Corolla liftback. The rebadged Corolla commercial van and business wagon were also available in September 1991, sold together with the older Sprinter Carib as Toyota developed another upmarket passenger wagon based on E100 platform called Corolla Touring Wagon.

Most of the engines were inherited from the E90 Sprinter, with additional new DOHC 16-valve 1.3 L 4E-FE and 1.5 L 5E-FE engines for certain models. The high performance GT trim received new 20-valve 4A-GE "silver top" engine, generating 160 PS (118 kW; 158 hp) at 7,400rpm. The 20-valve engine was ahead of its time when it was offered during this generation, coming with features like VVT, individual throttle bodies (ITB's), a compression ratio of 10.8:1 and a five-valve-per-cylinder head design. This helped the cars equipped with it to accelerate from 0–100 km/h in approximately 6 seconds and reach a top speed of over 200 km/h. A five-valve-per-cylinder engine was unusual for the time, however Mitsubishi was the first to offer a five-valve-per-cylinder engine in the Minica Dangan ZZ-4 kei car in 1989.

The sedan gained its first improvement in September 1991 with additional side door beams, rear three-point seat belts and seat belt warnings which became standard for all trims. The full-time four-wheel drive system option was also added for models with 1.6 L 4A-FE petrol and 2.0 L 2C-III diesel engines. The facelift occurred for the sedan in May 1993 with the redesign of the front grille, bumper, and rear combination lamps and stayed without further improvement until its discontinuation in May 1995.

The van and business wagon were remained on sale as a compact segment commercial wagon, together with the upmarket passenger oriented E100 Corolla Touring Wagon and the newly introduced E110 Sprinter Carib. Both of commercial wagons received improvement with new DOHC 16-valve 1.3 L 4E-FE and 1.5 L 5E-FE engines, replacing the old SOHC units with the same displacement in April 1994. The driver's airbag became standard for every trim and four-wheel drive model with 1.6 L 4A-FE engine was added to commercial van in May 1996. The 2.0 L diesel engine was replaced by a bigger 2.2 L 3C-E unit in April 1998. This new engine could be optioned with four-wheel drive system for the commercial van. The business wagon also received new standard safety pack such as front passenger airbag, ABS and seatbelts with pretensioner and force limiter. The 1998 safety pack update became standard for commercial van in August 2000 and the 4-speed manual transmission was upgraded to 5-speed unit. The wagons were discontinued in 2002 and succeeded by Probox. Toyota also introduced a 4-door hardtop sedan (with frameless door windows) based on E100 Sprinter/Corolla called the Sprinter Marino/Corolla Ceres.

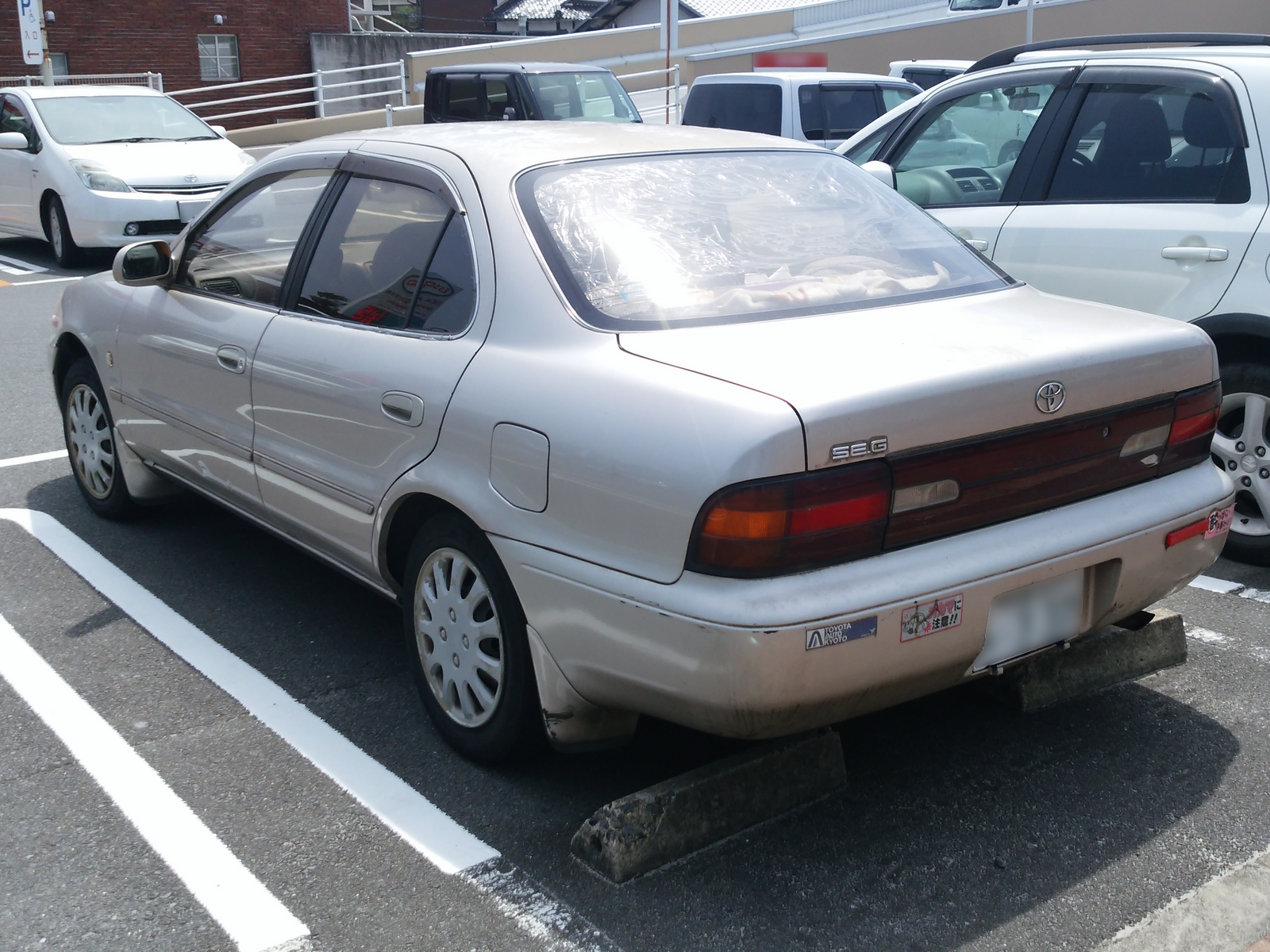
Pre-facelift Toyota Sprinter 1.6 SE-G sedan (AE101, Japan)

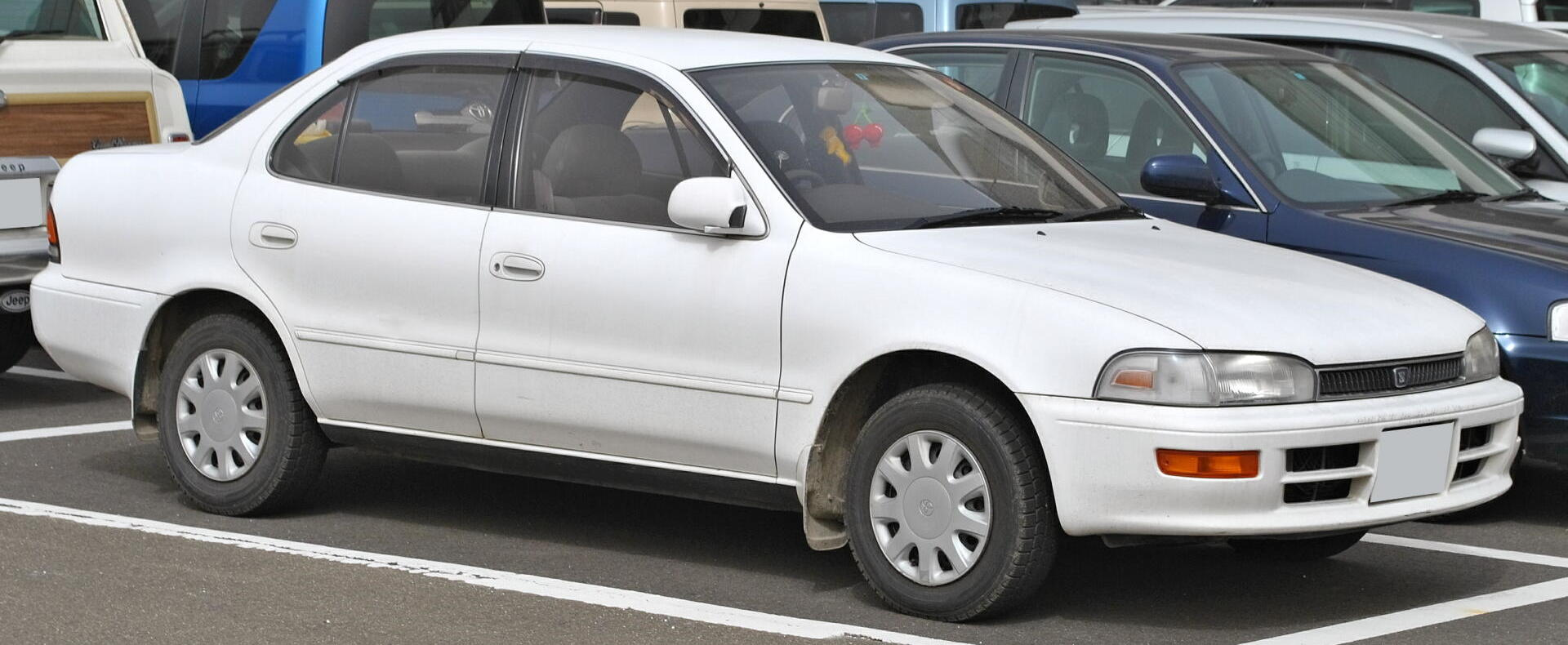
Facelift Sprinter 1.5 SE Limited sedan (AE100, Japan)

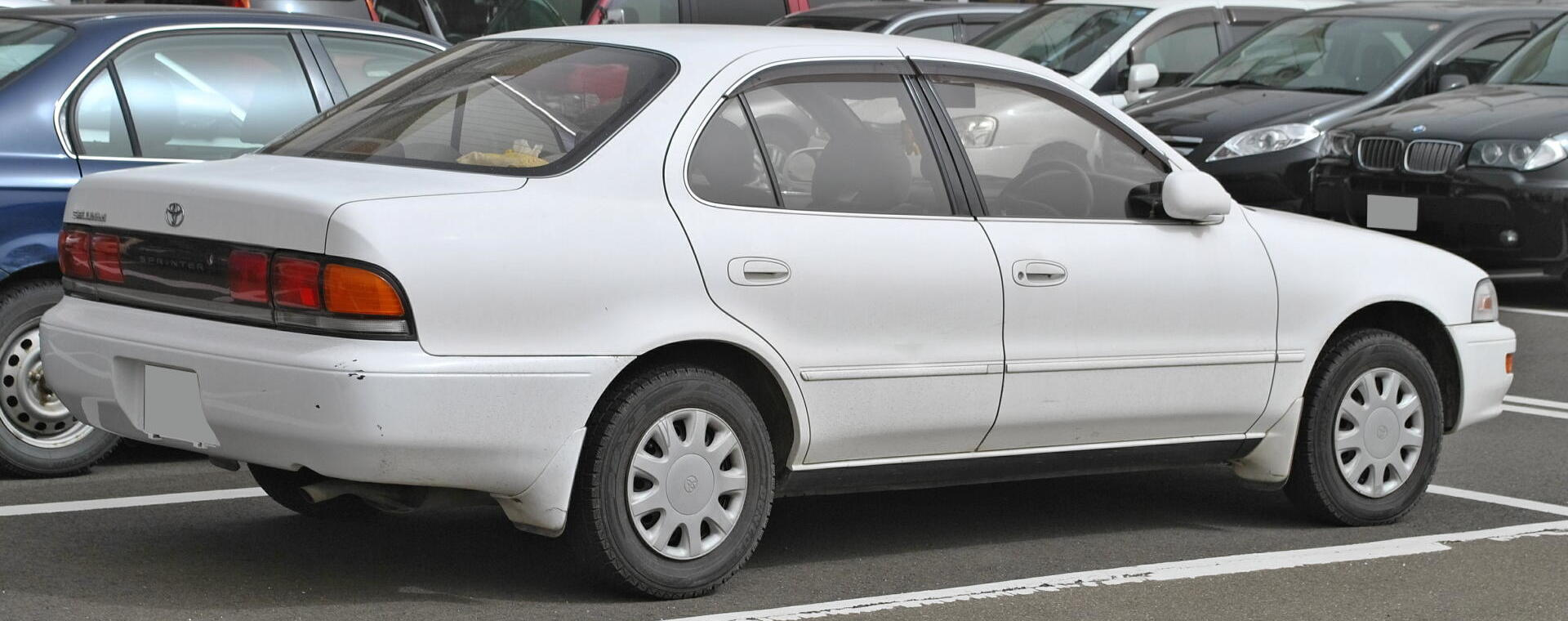
Rear view of facelift Sprinter 1.5 SE Limited sedan (AE100, Japan)

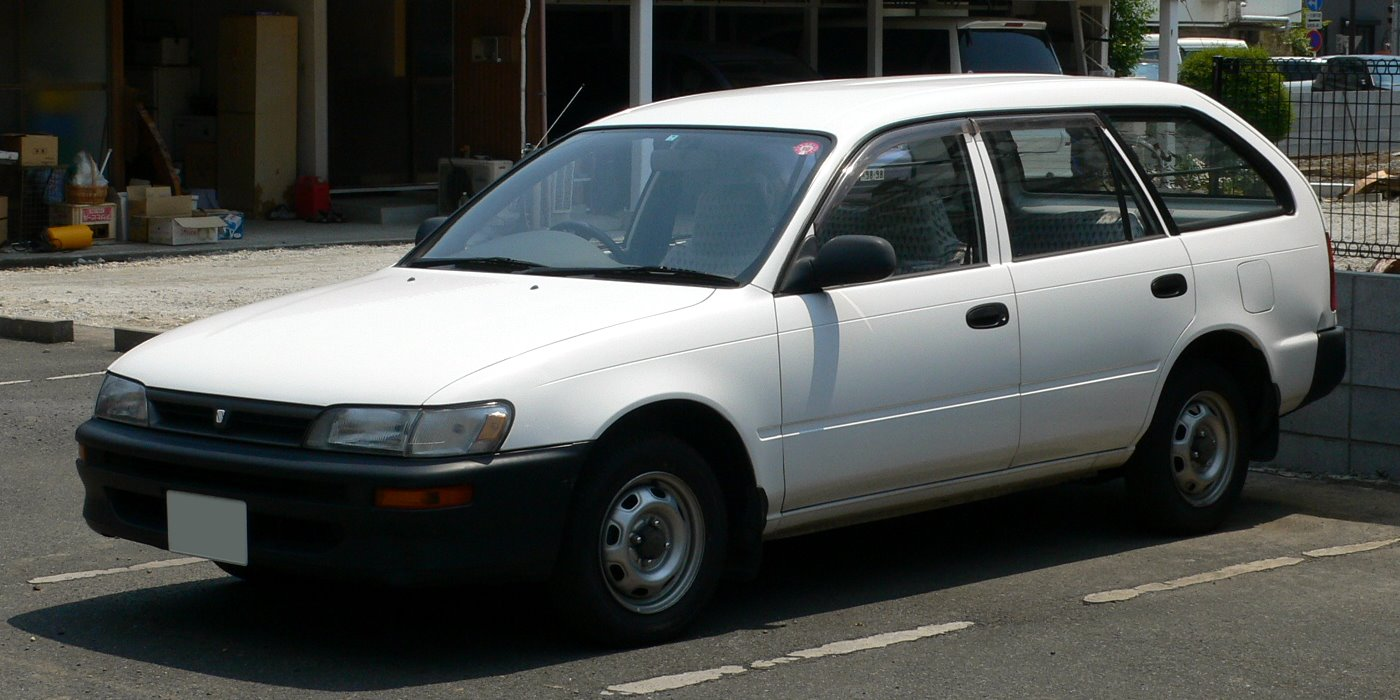
Facelift Sprinter commercial van (Japan)

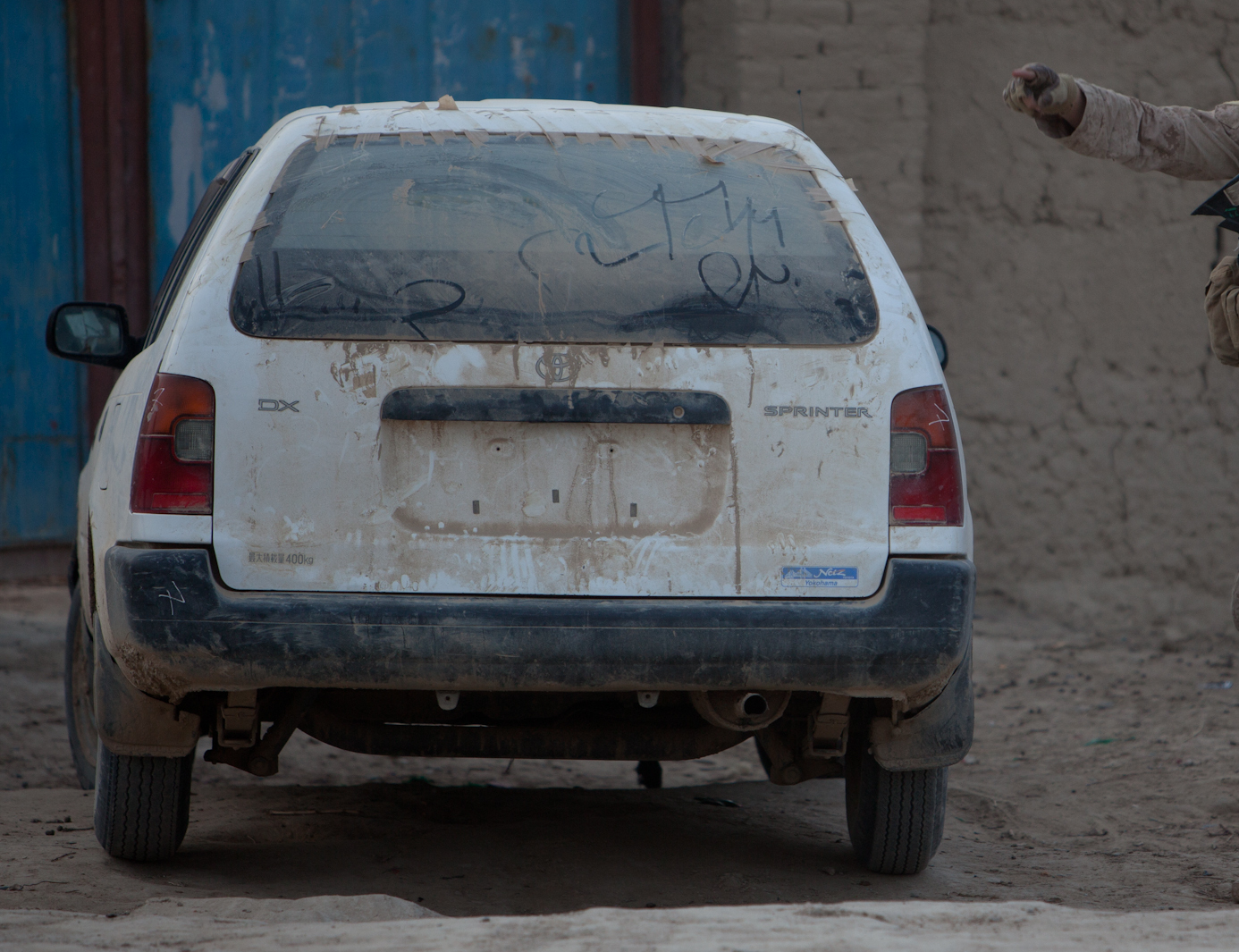
Rear view of Sprinter van

This platform was also produced in the US as the last Sprinter-based Geo Prizm and only available as a sedan, as the liftback body style was discontinued in the North American market.

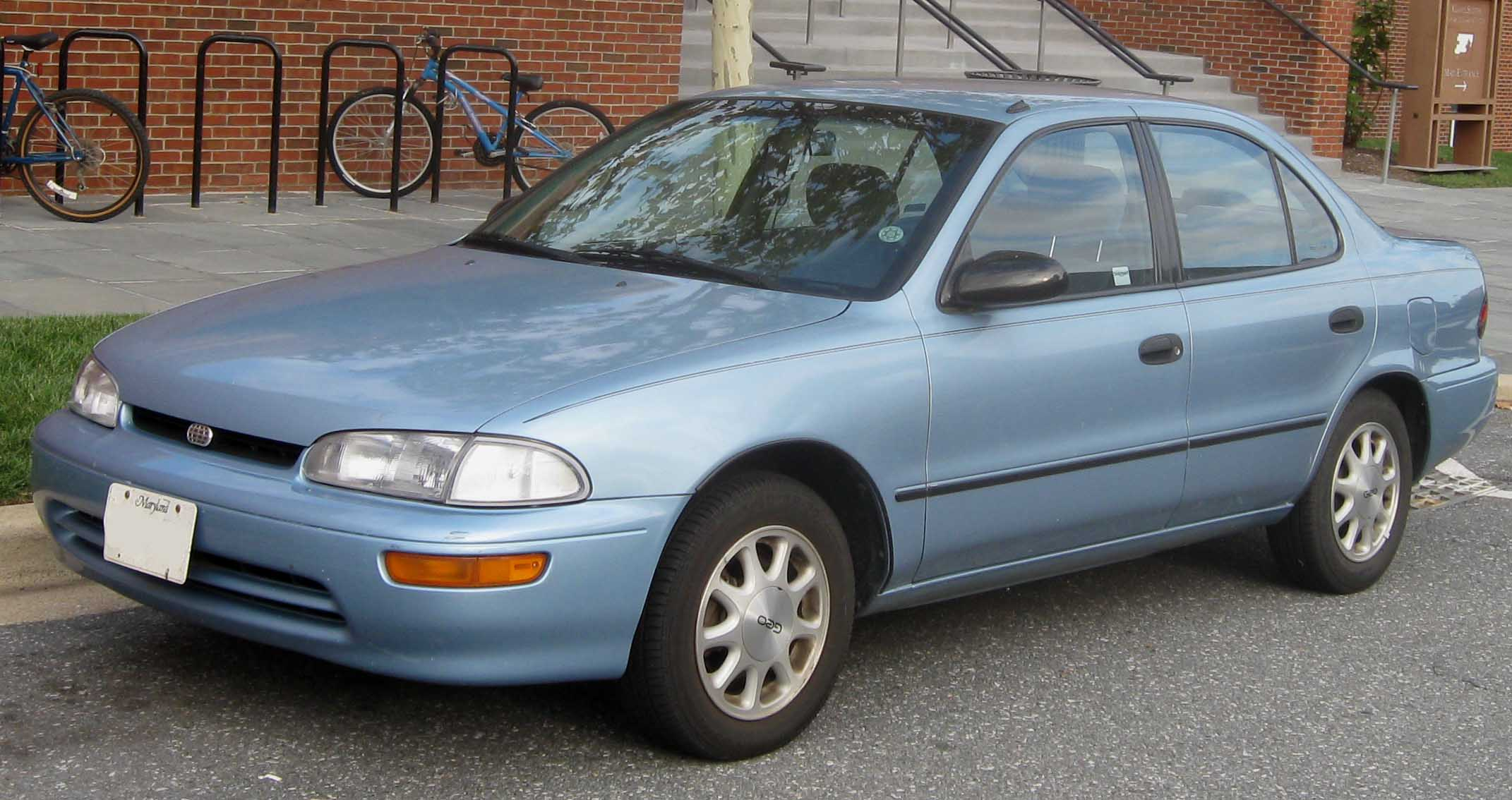
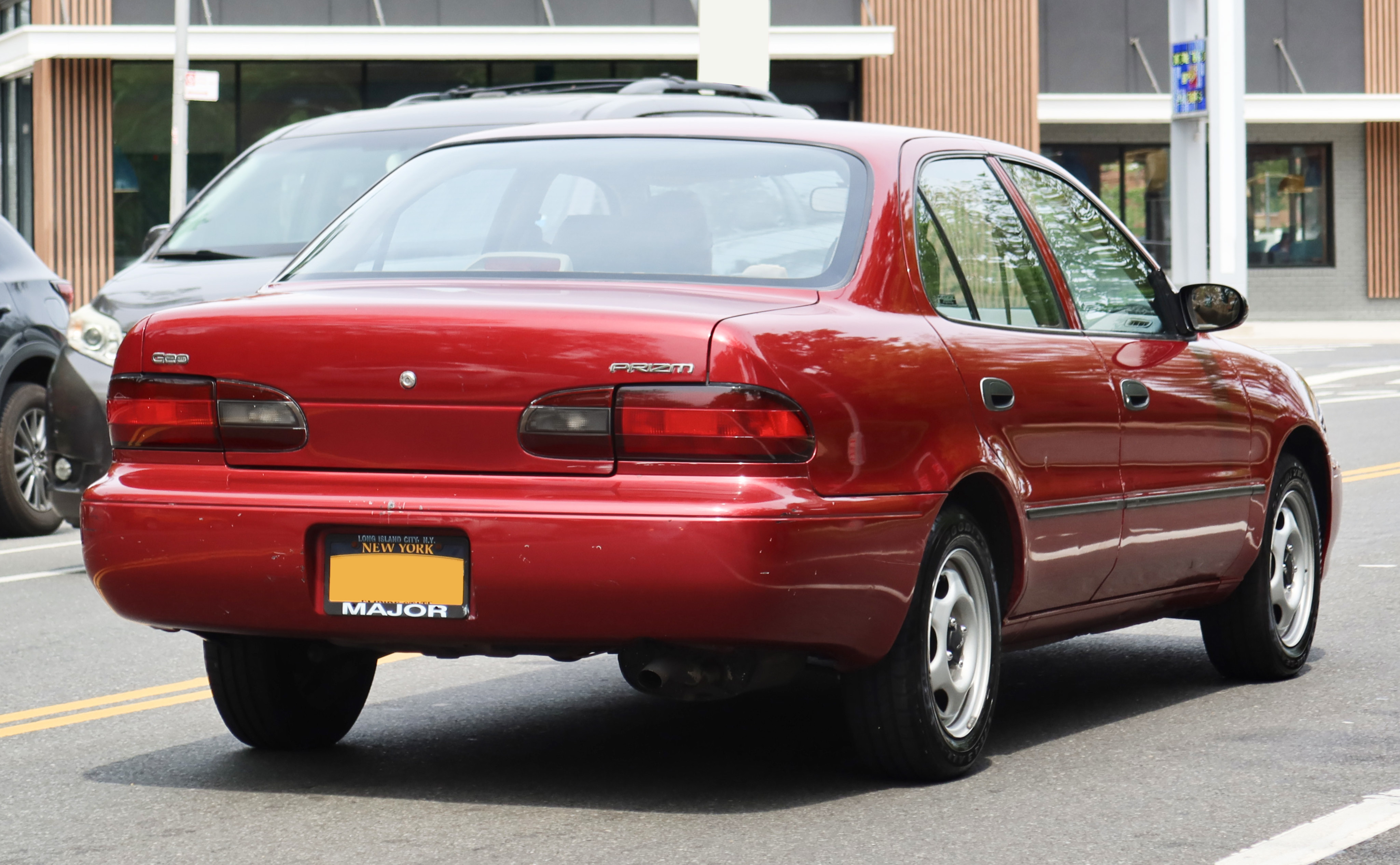
Sprinter sedan-based second generation North American market Geo Prizm

== Eighth generation (E110; 1995) ==
Eighth generation
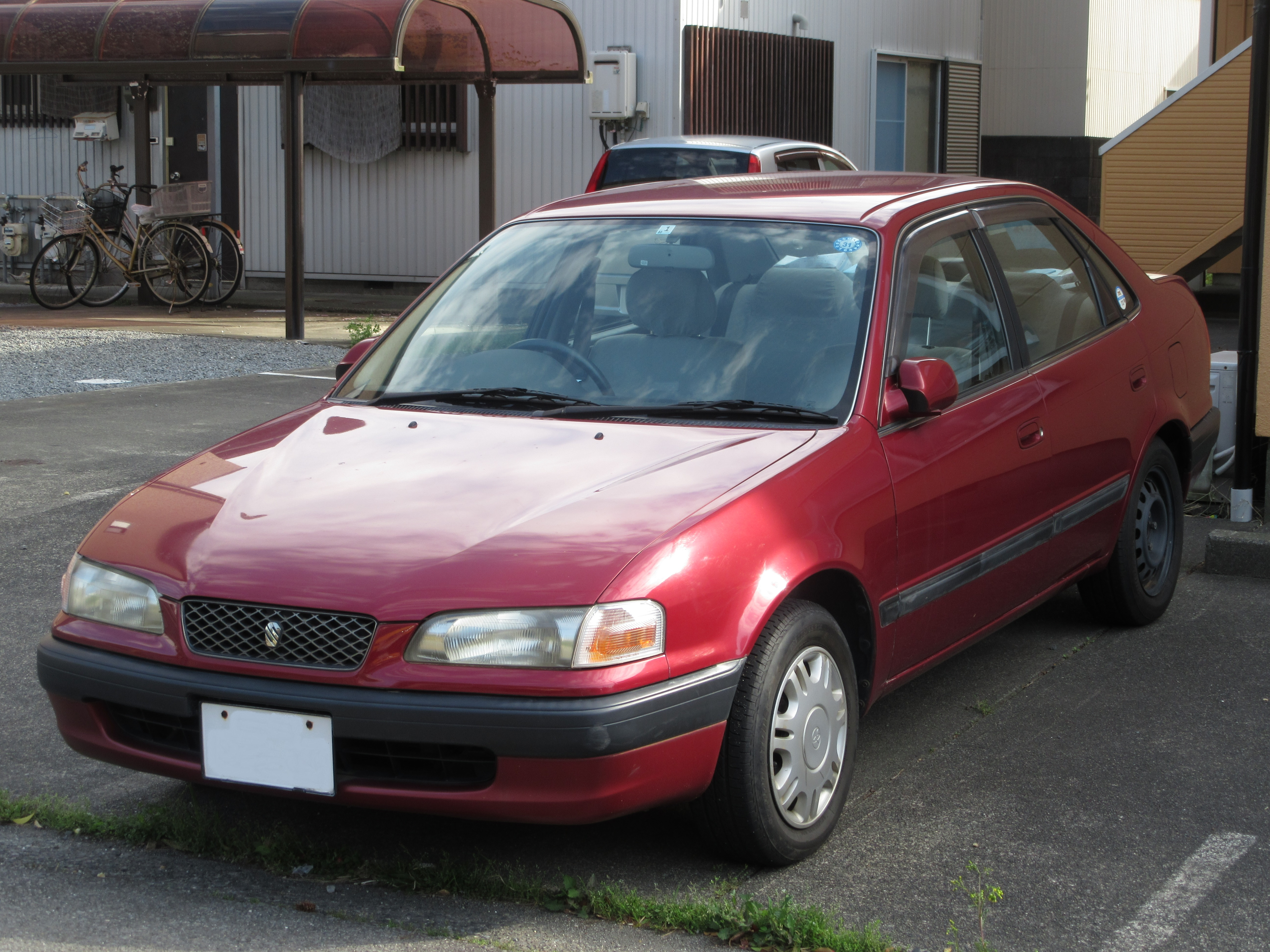
- Pre-facelift Toyota Sprinter 1.6 S-Cruise (AE111, Japan)

Overview
- Model code: E110
- Assembly: Japan: Takaoka Plant, Toyota City; Japan: Ōbu, Aichi (Toyota Industries)

Body and chassis
- Body style: 4-door sedan
- Layout: Front engine, front-wheel drive; Front engine, all-wheel drive (AE114/CE114/CE116)
- Related: Toyota Corolla (E110); Toyota Corolla Spacio (E110); Toyota Sprinter Trueno/Corolla Levin (AE110/111); Sprinter Carib/Corolla wagon (E110); Toyota Sprinter Marino/Corolla Ceres; Geo Prizm (E110)

Powertrain
- Engine: Petrol: 1.3 L 4E-FE I4 (EE111); 1.5 L 5A-FE I4 (AE110); 1.6 L 4A-FE I4 (AE111/114); 1.6 L 4A-GE 20-valve I4 (AE111); Diesel: 2.0 L 2C-III I4 (CE110/114); 2.2 L 3C-E I4 (CE113/116)
- Transmission: 3-speed A132L automatic; 4-speed A241H/A241L/A245E/A246E automatic; 4-speed C40 manual; 5-speed C50/C51/E55F/E59F/S50/S51 manual; 6-speed C160 manual

Dimensions
- Wheelbase: 2,465 mm (97.0 in)
- Length: 4,310 mm (169.7 in)
- Width: 1,690 mm (66.5 in)
- Height: 1,385–1,400 mm (54.5–55.1 in)
- Curb weight: 920–1,250 kg (2,028.3–2,755.8 lb)

The eighth and last generation Sprinter was introduced in May 1995 with particular consideration for the environment, increasing safety standard and total production cost due to the Lost Decades recession that was happening in Japan at the time. Because of this, the E110 Sprinter kept many of the E100's components as well as its platform, hardly changed its body dimensions and yet managed to reduce the weight for the early models. The rear quarter window on the C-pillars was also revived, ostensibly to impart the Sprinter with a "sporty and youthful image".

The E110 Sprinter became the basis of third generation Sprinter Carib, which was also exported to Europe with different face as Corolla wagon. The E100 Sprinter wagons continued for sale as commercial vehicles.

In May 1996, the dual airbags and ABS safety package became standard for every trim level. Eleven months later, the sedan received its facelift and adopting the GOA (Global Outstanding Assessment) body structure technology. The GT trim was also revived with 5 PS (4 kW; 5 hp) extra power than the older AE101 GT and paired with 6-speed manual transmission. The last major update of Sprinter was announced in April 1998, the 2.0 2C-III diesel engine was replaced by a bigger 2.2 L 3C-E unit and also new 5-speed manual option for 1.3 4E-FE engine.

The Sprinter sedan sales was axed in December 2000 in favor of a twin of the E120 Corolla RunX hatchback called the Allex. The older E100 Sprinter commercial wagons continued on until July 2002.

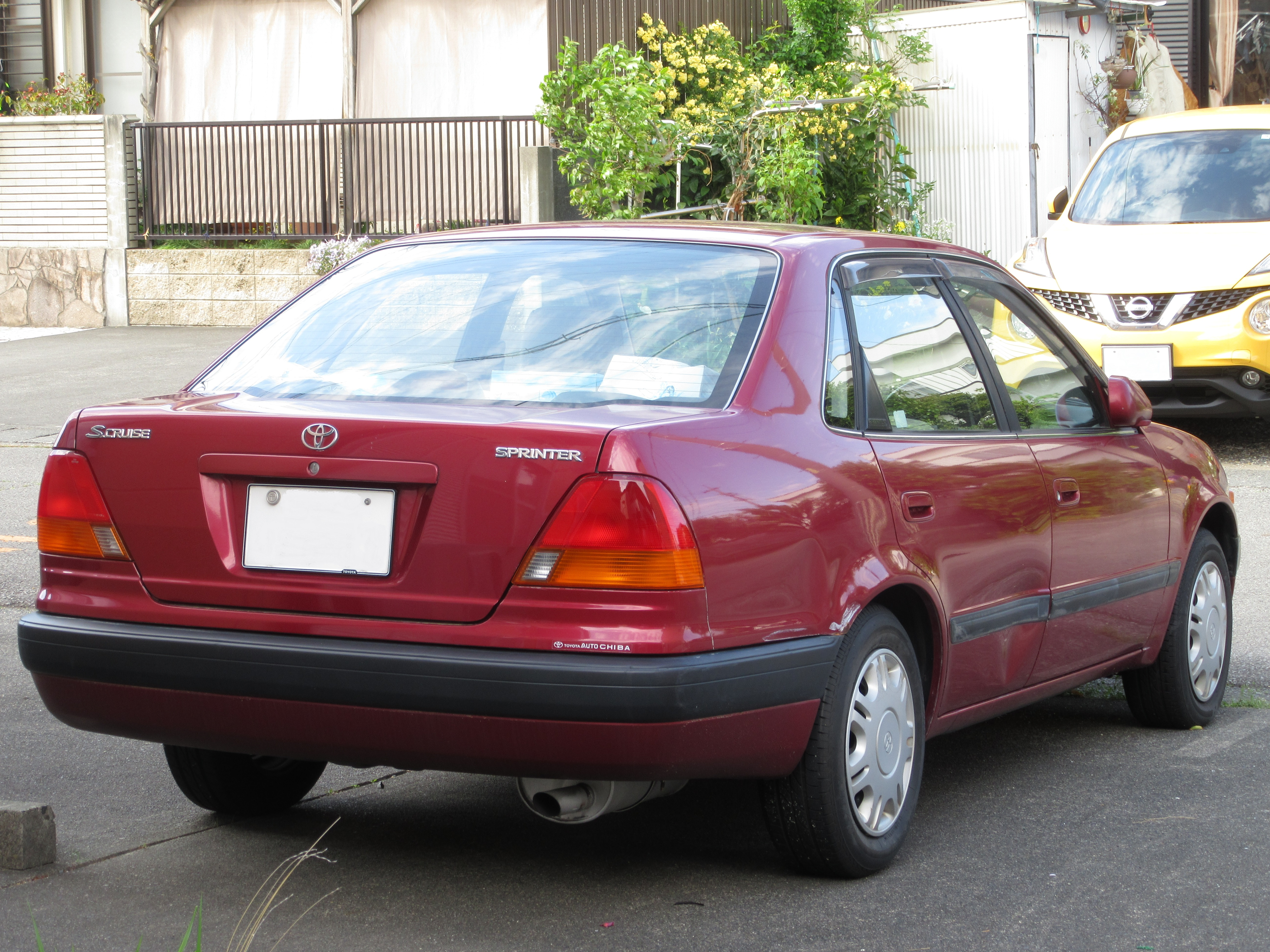
Pre-facelift Toyota Sprinter 1.6 S-Cruise (AE111, Japan)

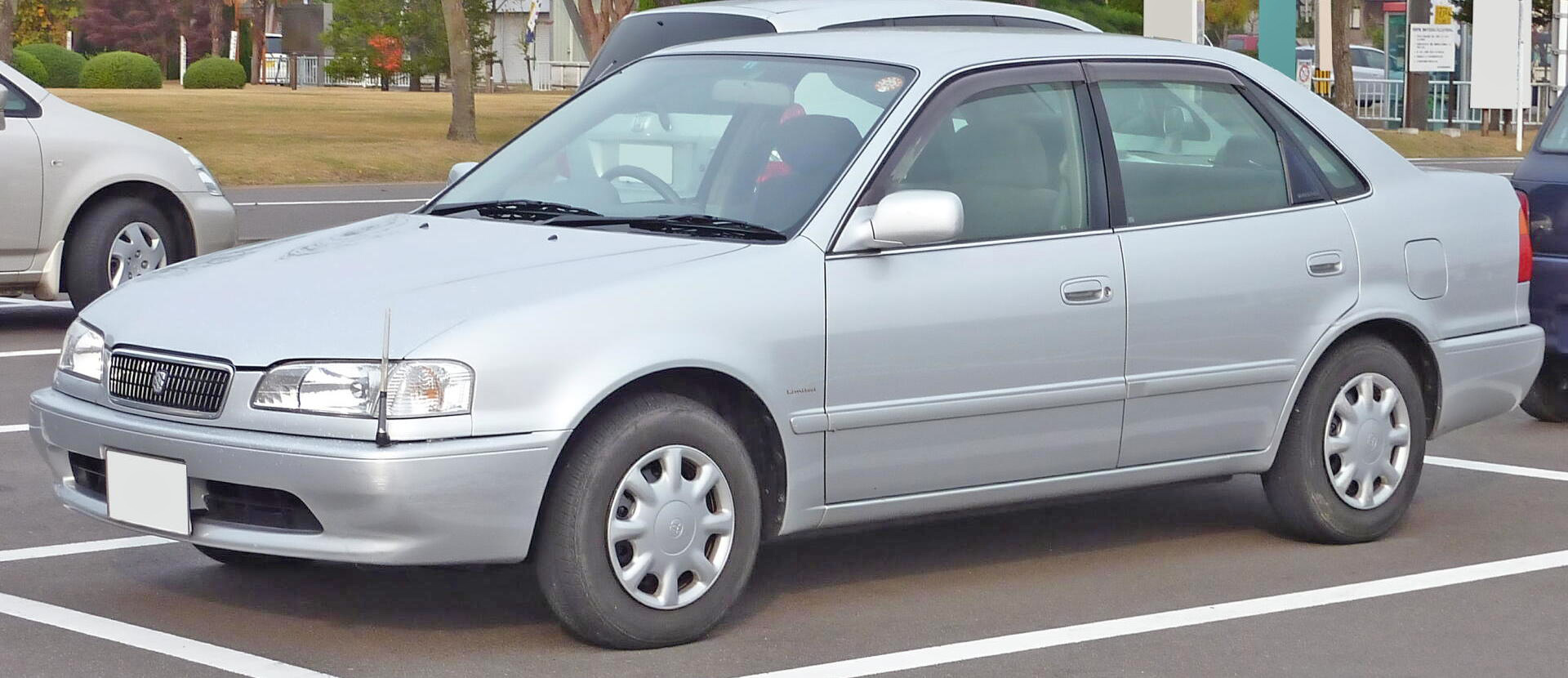
Facelift Toyota Sprinter 1.5 XE Vintage Limited (AE110, Japan)

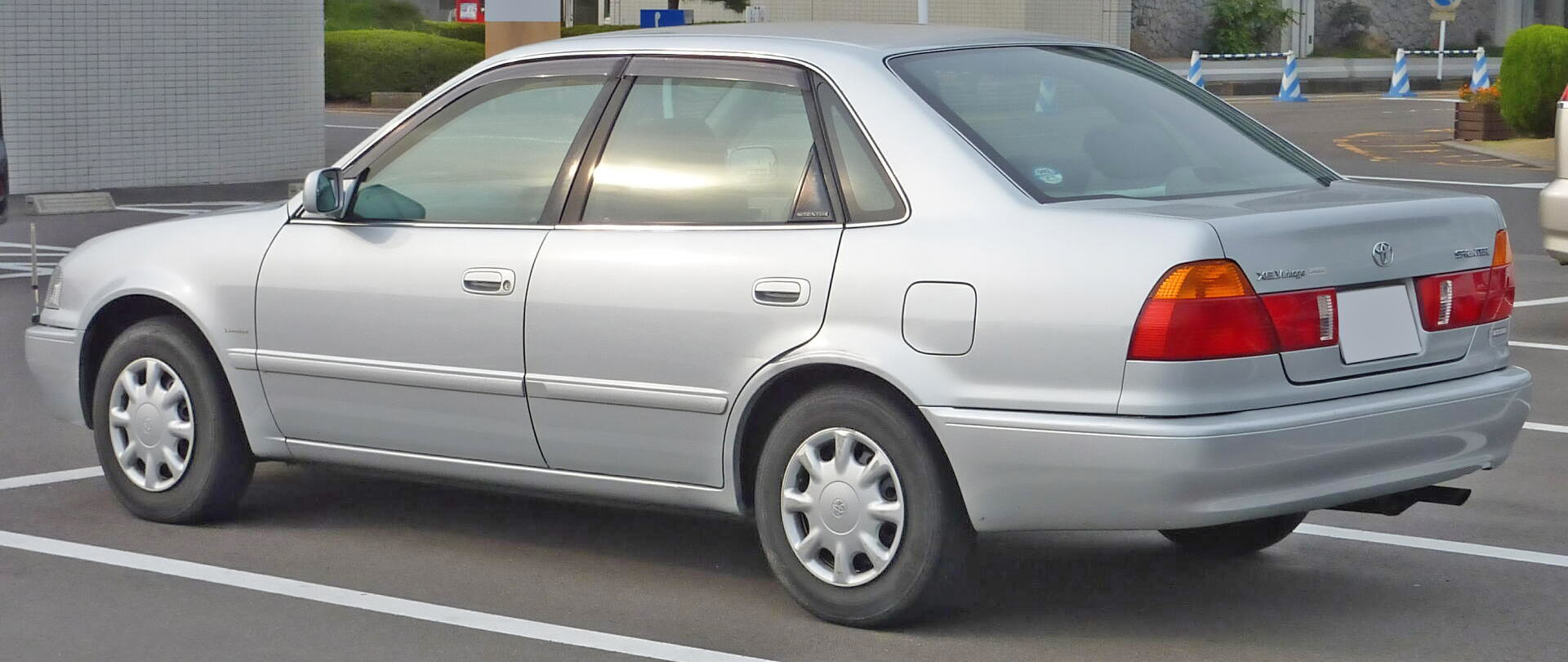
Facelift Toyota Sprinter 1.5 XE Vintage Limited (AE110, Japan)

== Nameplate usage for other models ==
The Sprinter name was used as a sportier specification of the Corolla sedan in South Africa from E30 until E80 generation. The nameplate was later reused in 2006 (E110), 2010 (E140) and 2014 (E180).

In select European market, the 1970–1972 KE25 coupé was marketed as the Corolla Sprinter. The 1970–1971 model had Sprinter "S" emblems on the front wings and boot, but it was later changed to "SPRINTER" emblem possibly due to the similarity to the Sig-Rune symbol.

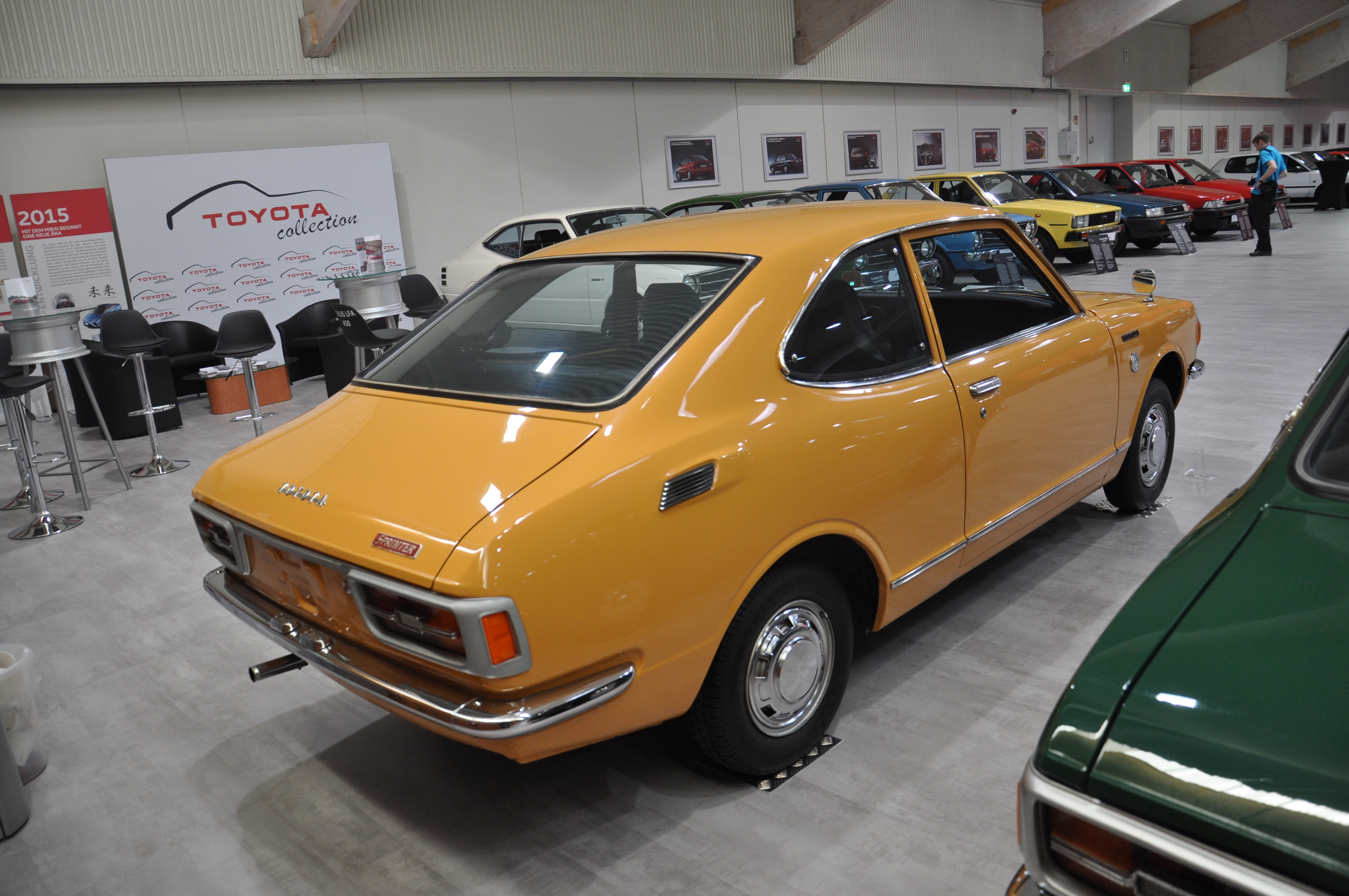
1971–1972 Corolla Sprinter coupé with the updated emblem (KE25, Germany)

Australian market AE86 liftback was sold as Sprinter, while the rest of the world received the same car as Corolla GT, GT-S or SR-5. This Sprinter was a hybrid of European market Corolla GT face and Japanese market Sprinter Trueno rear.

European market E100 Corolla liftback was sold in Australia as Corolla Sprinter from 1994 to 1996, the liftback is based on the sedan body shell.

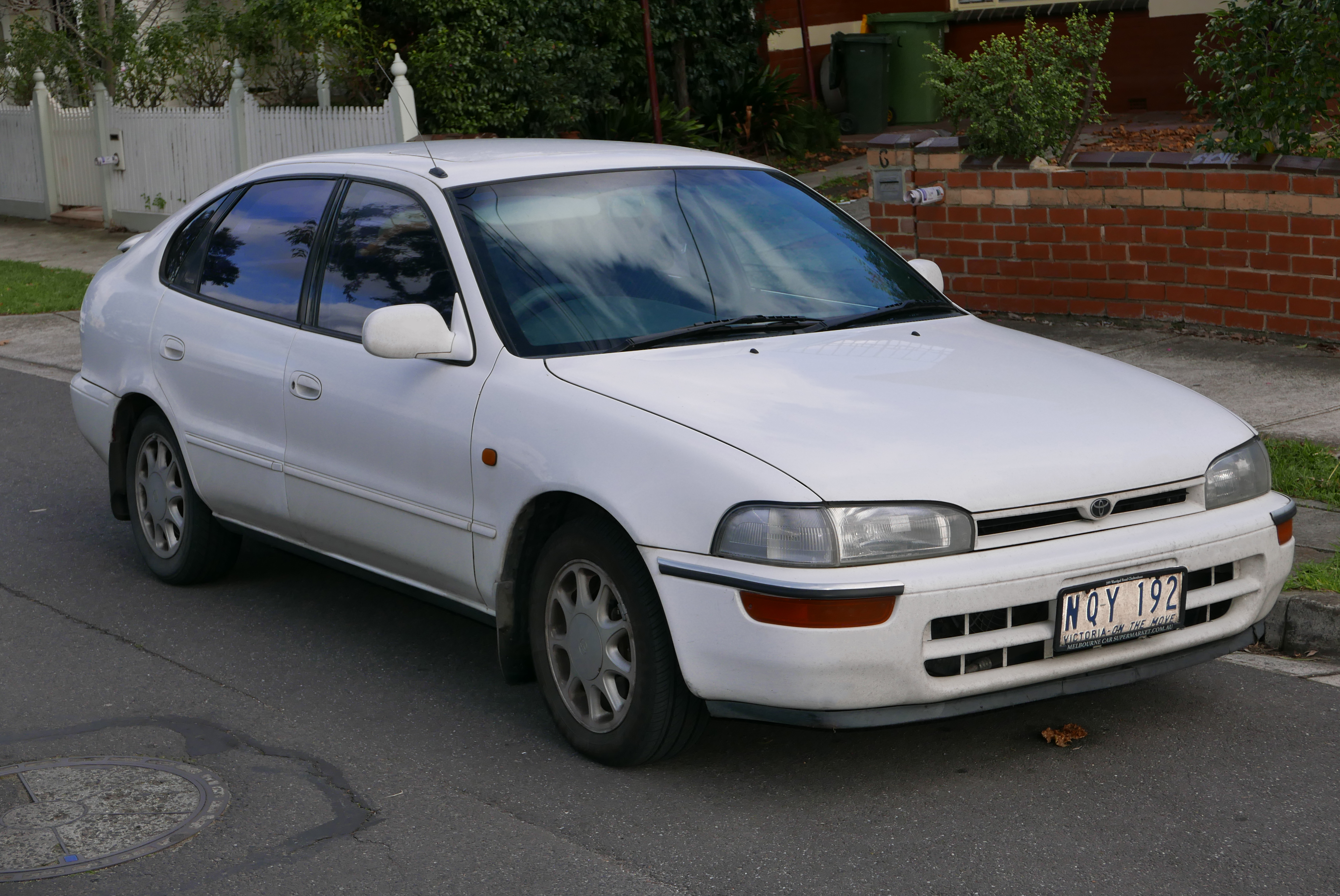
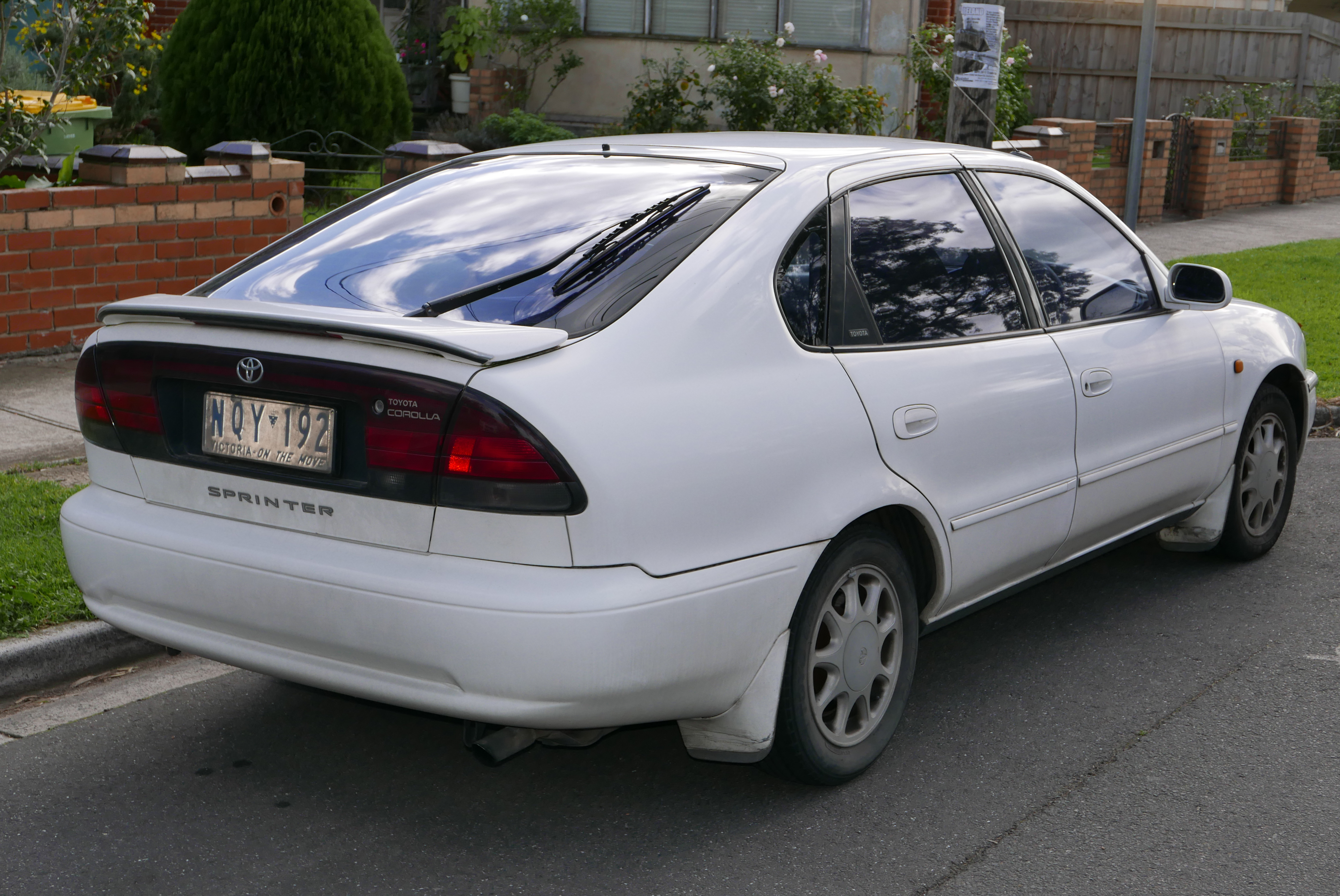
Corolla Sprinter 1.8 liftback (AE102, Australia)
