= 4K =

4K, 4-K or 4k may refer to:

- 4000 (number)
- Four kibibytes (4 × 1024 bytes, better written 4 KiB)
  - 4K disk sector size (Advanced Format)
  - 4K demoscene compo, a computer art competition using programs limited to 4 kibibytes
  - The Java 4K Game Programming Contest
- 4K resolution, a collective term for digital video formats having a horizontal resolution of approximately 4,000 pixels
  - 4K UHDTV, an ultra-high-definition television format
- 4K, the IATA airline code for Askari Aviation
- 4K, an alternative name for Cuatro Cabezas (Four Heads), an Argentine multimedia production company.
- 4K, model of Toyota K engine
- 4K, the production code for the 1976 Doctor Who serial The Brain of Morbius
- 4KScore test for prostate cancer screening
- Kenn Borek Air, a Canadian airline IATA code
- 4K, a song by Darell, El Alfa, and Noriel

== See also ==
- 4000 (disambiguation)
- KKKK (disambiguation)
