= Daihatsu Charmant =

Subcompact car produced by Daihatsu (1974–1988)

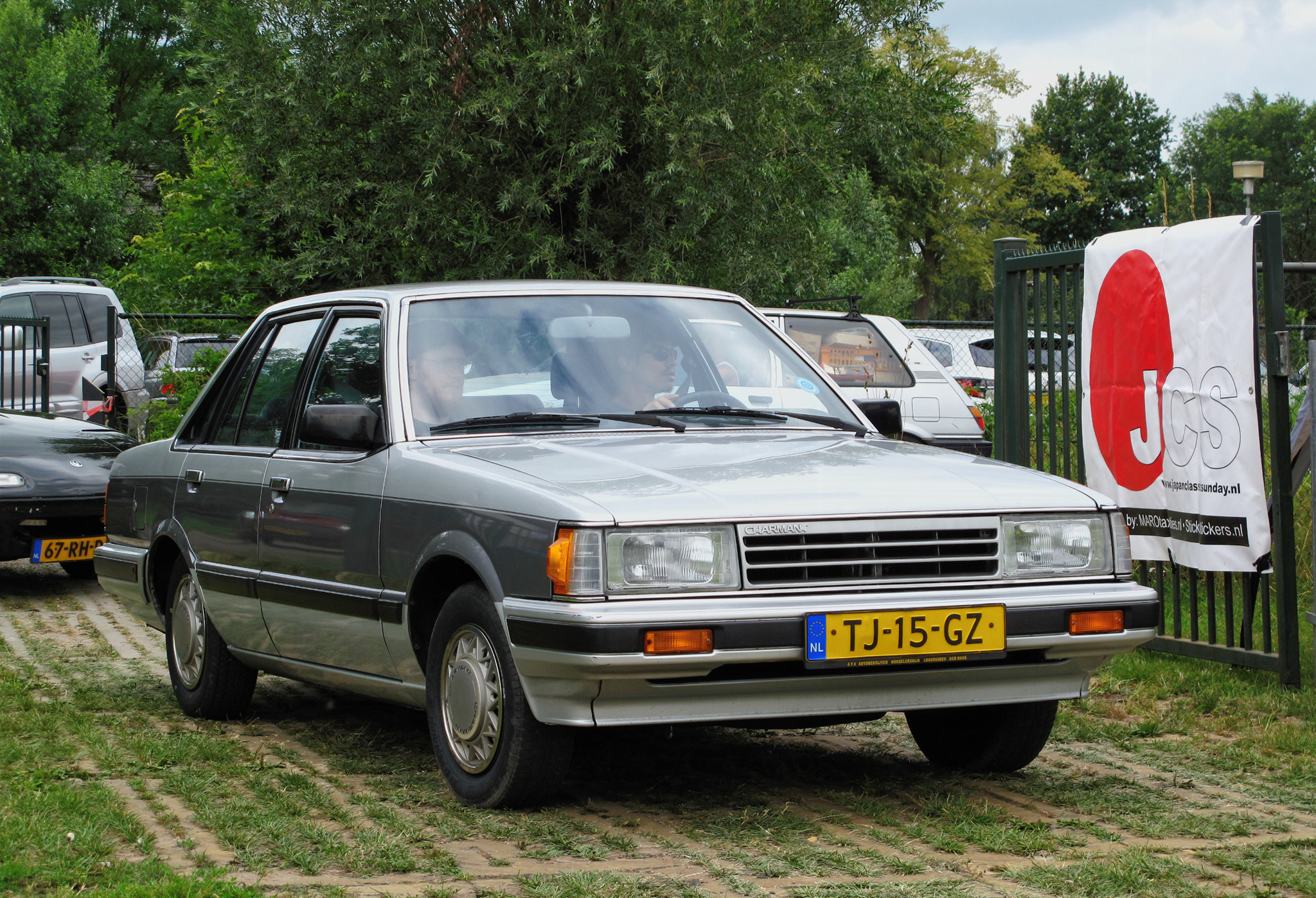
- 1984–1988 Daihatsu Charmant LC (A35)

Overview
- Manufacturer: Daihatsu
- Production: 1974–1988

Body and chassis
- Class: Subcompact car
- Layout: Front-engine, rear-wheel drive

Chronology
- Predecessor: Daihatsu Consorte
- Successor: Daihatsu Applause; Daihatsu Charade Social

The Daihatsu Charmant (Japanese: ダイハツ・シャルマン, Hepburn: Daihatsu Sharuman) is a subcompact car built by Daihatsu. It was succeeded by the Applause and Charade Social a little over a year after Charmant production ended. The Charmant was heavily based on the E20/E70 Toyota Corolla platforms; model changes paralleled those of the Corolla. All Charmants were fitted with Toyota inline-four engines, ranging from 1.2 to 1.6-litres. The word charmant is French for "charming."

When it was introduced, it was the largest Daihatsu passenger vehicle sold in Japan (until the introduction of the Delta Wide minivan in 1982), with the Charade supermini in the middle (introduced in 1977), and the Fellow Max (succeeded by Mira in 1980) kei car as the smallest.

== First generation (A10/A20/A30/A40; 1974–1981) ==
Daihatsu Charmant
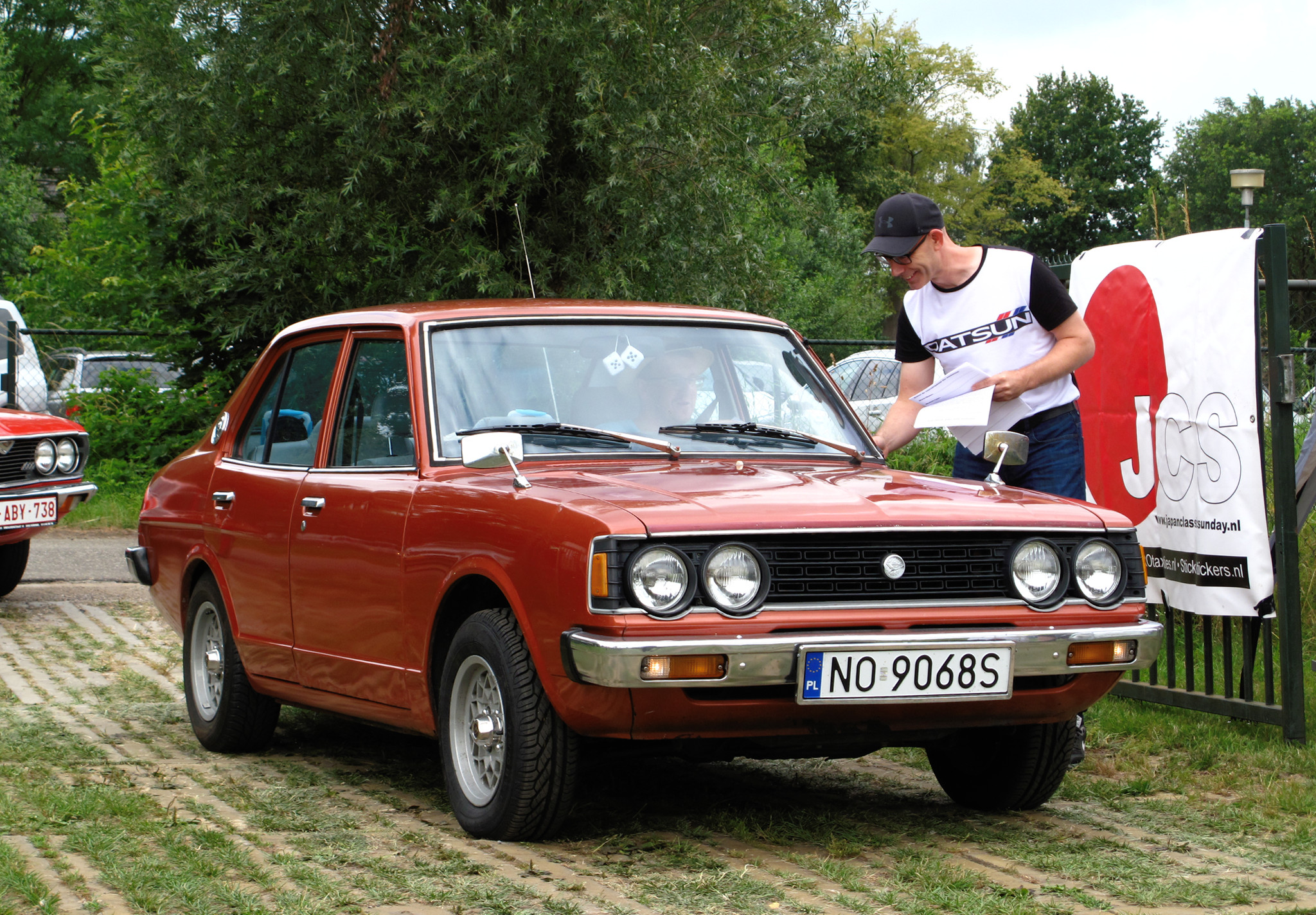
- 1978–1981 Daihatsu Charmant 1400 saloon (A20; Europe)

Overview
- Model code: A10/20/30/40
- Production: 1974–1981
- Assembly: Ōyamazaki, Kyoto (Kyoto Plant), Japan

Body and chassis
- Body style: 4-door saloon; 5-door estate/van
- Related: Toyota Corolla (E20); Toyota Sprinter (E20); Toyota Corolla Levin/Sprinter Trueno (TE27)

Powertrain
- Engine: 1.2 L 3K/3K-H/3K-HJ/3K-U OHV I4 (A10); 1.3 L 4K-U/4K-J OHV I4 (A30); 1.4 L T/T-J OHV I4 (A20); 1.6 L 2T OHV I4 (A40); 1.6 L 12T-U/12T-J OHV I4 (A40)
- Transmission: 2-speed A20 automatic; 3-speed A30 automatic; 4-speed K40/T40 manual; 5-speed K50/T50 manual

Dimensions
- Wheelbase: 2,355 mm (92.7 in)
- Length: Saloon: 3,995–4,005 mm (157.3–157.7 in) (1974–1978); 4,110 mm (161.8 in) (1978–1981); Estate/van: 4,015 mm (158.1 in) (1974–1978); 4,090 mm (161.0 in) (1978–1981)
- Width: 1,520 mm (59.8 in) (1974–1978); 1,530 mm (60.2 in) (1978–1981, saloon)
- Height: 1,380 mm (54.3 in) (saloon); 1,390 mm (54.7 in) (estate/van)
- Curb weight: 790–915 kg (1,742–2,017 lb) (saloon); 805–915 kg (1,775–2,017 lb) (estate/van)

First presented in November 1974, the first generation Daihatsu Charmant was based on the Toyota Corolla (E20) platform, which was already outdated because Toyota had already introduced the latest generation Corolla (E30) seven months earlier. However, the body shell looks more like the Sprinter (E20) saloon because of the similarity of the rear section from the C-pillar all the way down to the boot which is different from the Corolla, which also had a body length that is almost identical as the newer Corolla. The Charmant was marketed with luxury orientation by the use of dual headlights which was only available for higher class cars at the time. Initially only three grades were offered; Deluxe, Custom and Hi-Custom. It came with 1.2-litre (1166 cc) 3K-H engine producing 71 PS (52 kW; 70 hp) and 1.4-litre (1407 cc) T engine producing 86 PS (63 kW; 85 hp), both in gross rating. It came with a four or five-speed manual transmission, as well as a two-speed automatic options for all engines. All-wheel drum brakes were standard for the base Deluxe, while the higher grades were equipped with front disc brakes and booster.

Unique to the first generation, an estate was also available. This was called "van" in the Japanese domestic market, where it was classed as a commercial vehicle and can be recognized by the additional horizontal metal bars on the third row windows. Unlike the Corolla, the Charmant estate/van was only offered with a 5-door body style. The van was introduced in December 1974, a month after the saloons debuted. These vans were only available with a standard four-speed manual transmission and an additional base grade called Standard, while the top grade Hi-Custom was exclusive for the saloons. The saloons were coded as A10 (1.2-litre) and A20 (1.4-litre) (A10V and A20V for the vans), respectively.

In 1975, the engines were improved with the implementation of DECS-C (Daihatsu Economical Cleanup System-Catalyst) emission control (catalytic converter) to pass 1975 Japanese emission regulation. These engines were now called 3K-U and T-U and producing 64 PS (47 kW; 63 hp) and 78 PS (57 kW; 77 hp) gross, respectively. A minor facelift appeared in November 1976 with a refreshed front grille, two new grades for the saloons; Grand Custom (GC) and Sporty Custom (SC), combined with another engine tweak for the saloons to pass the 1976 emission regulation (the vans had less stringent emission standards). The power of 1.4-litre T-U engine was raised to 82 PS (60 kW; 81 hp) gross, but lost the two-speed automatic option.

The 1.2- and 1.4-litre engines were replaced by the 72 PS (53 kW; 71 hp) 1.3-litre (1290 cc) 4K-U (A30) and the 88 PS (65 kW; 87 hp) 1.6-litre (1588 cc) DECS-L lean-burn 12T-U (A40) in March 1978, along with a major changes to the exterior and interior, including a boxier face, a new set of taillights, additional protective side strip (GC trim only), refreshed seat upholstery and a new three-speed automatic with overdrive for 1.6-litre engine (GC and HC trims only). The older engines were remained for the vans, but were renamed 3K-HJ and T-J because of another round of modifications to pass the 1978 emission regulation, and now generates 67 PS (49 kW; 66 hp) and 80 PS (59 kW; 79 hp), respectively. The 1.3- and 1.6-litre engines for the vans arrived in 1979, called 4K-J and 12T-J, these commercial designed engines generates lower output at 69 PS (51 kW; 68 hp) and 86 PS (63 kW; 85 hp), respectively, and still with a standard four-speed manual transmission.

1974–1976 Daihatsu Charmant 1400 Hi-Custom (A20; Japan)

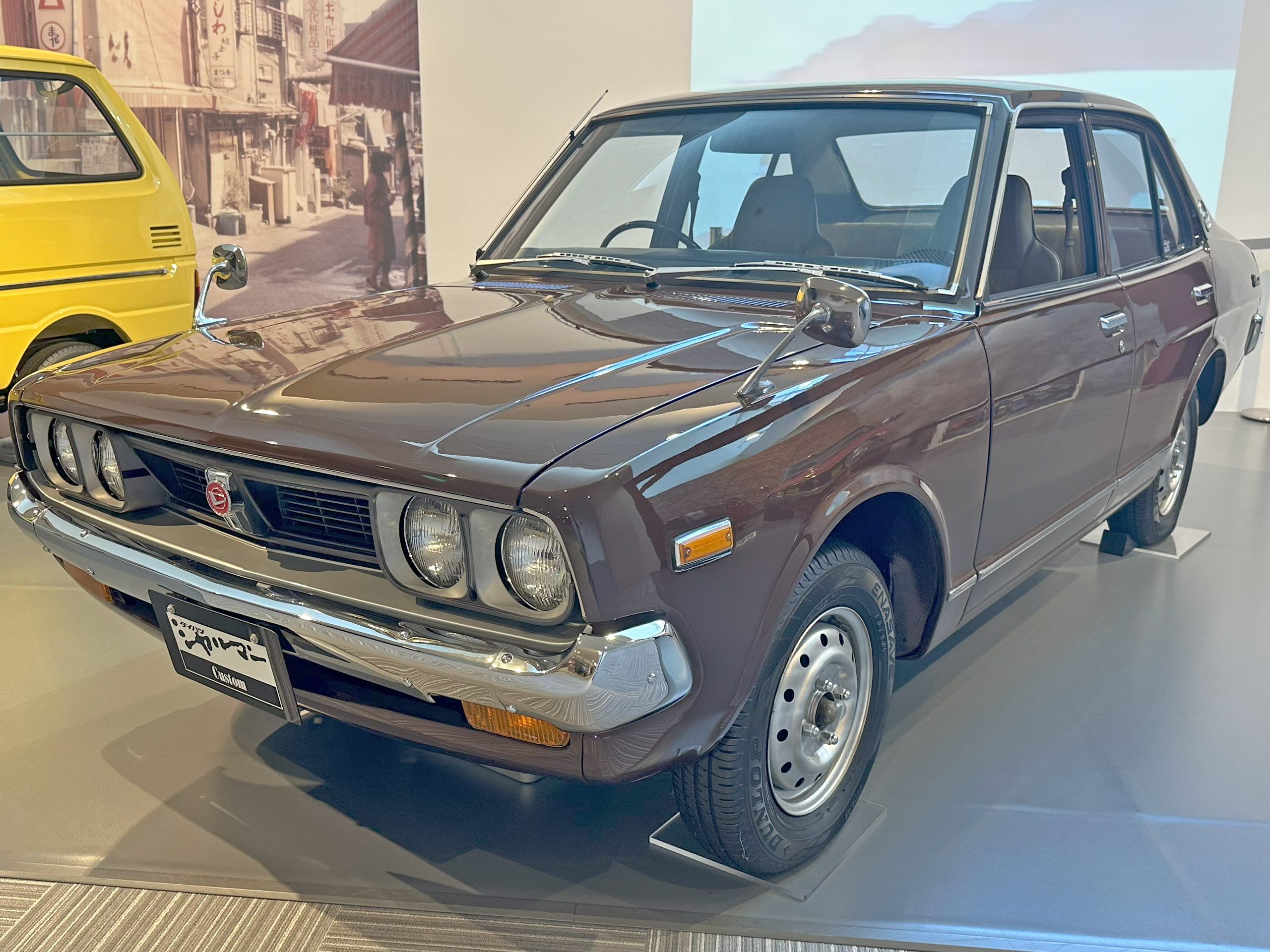
1976–1978 Daihatsu Charmant 1400 Custom (A20; Japan)

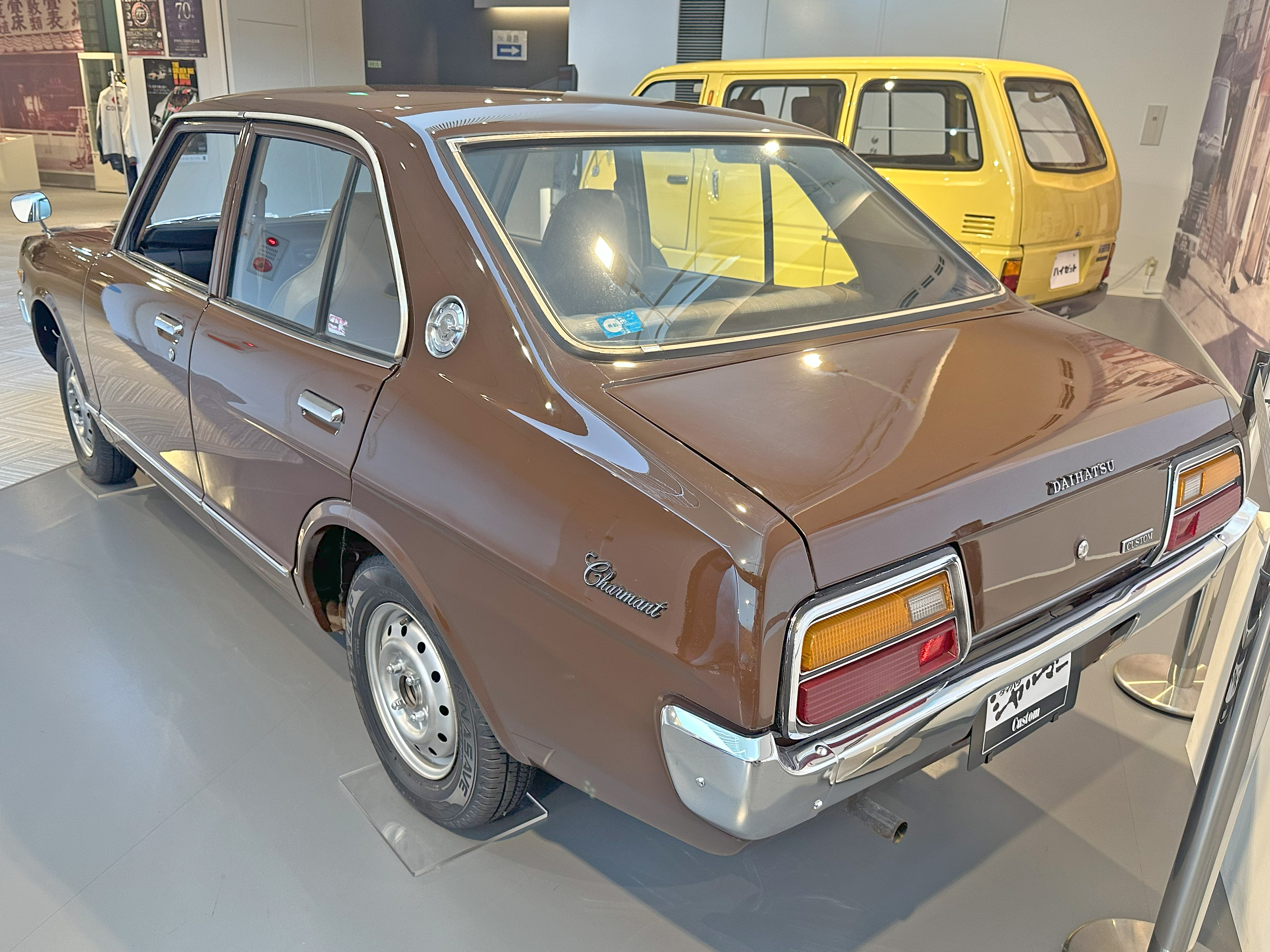
1974–1978 rear end

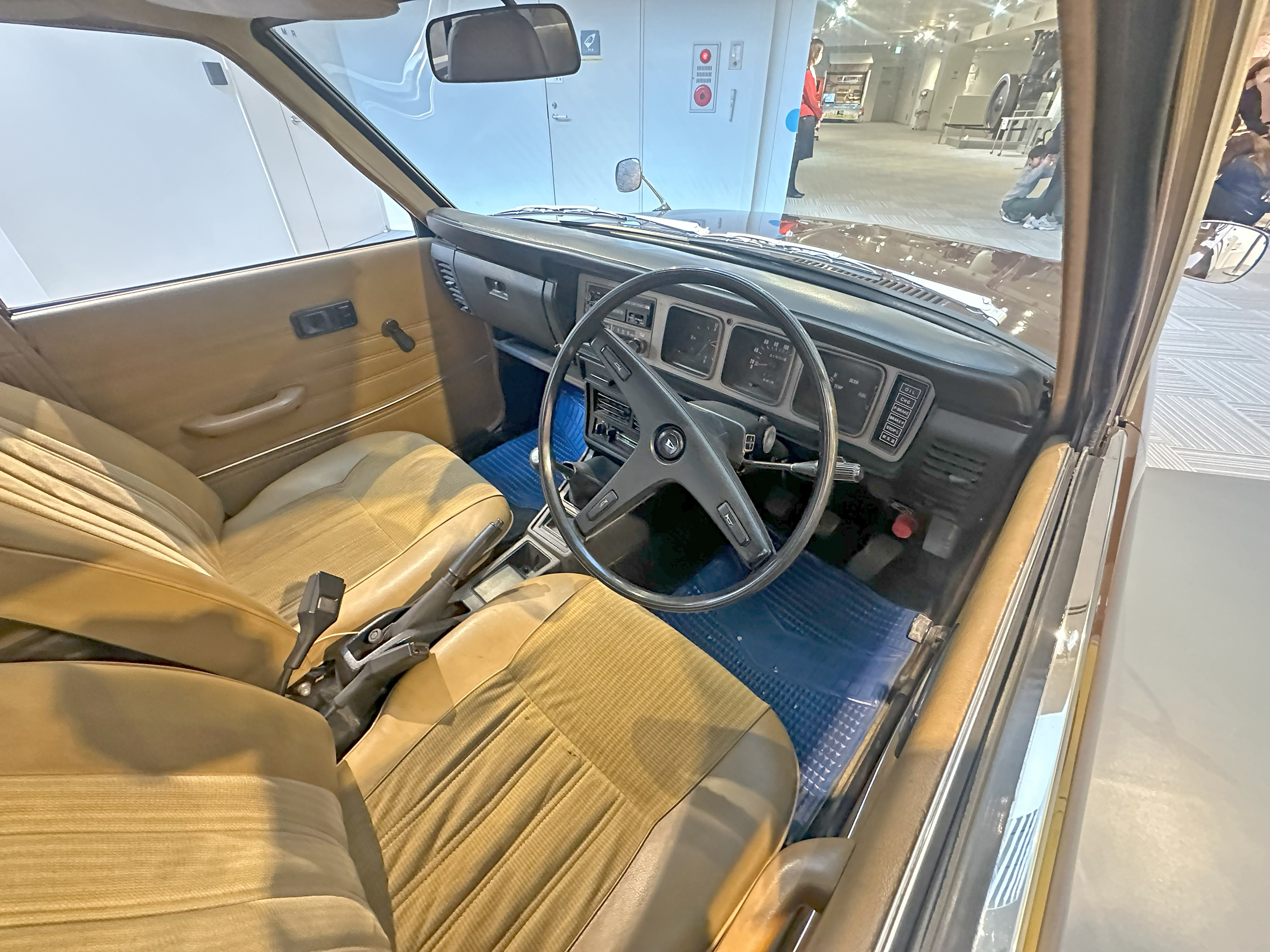
Japanese market interior

=== Export ===
This model was exported to a fair number of countries from 1976, mostly markets without their own automobile industry. Generally, it was only offered with a single unnamed grade. These export specification Charmants were fitted with the general specification of 3K and T engines (without the Japanese market emission control tools), generating 55 PS (40 kW; 54 hp) and 62 PS (46 kW; 61 hp) in net form, respectively. It only came with a four-speed manual transmission. These engines remained in the 1978 facelift, until a bigger 1.6-litre 2T engine was added to the line up in 1979, it produced 75 PS (55 kW; 74 hp) net. This engine was available with additional five-speed manual or three-speed automatic options. For left-hand drive markets, the car fitted with a dashboard from the Corolla (E20), but updated with a thicker upper panel and Charmant's square instrument cluster.

It was the first Daihatsu to be sold in Iceland, where a large number of surplus cars from the Netherlands were brought in the summer of 1979. Sold at a very low price, it became one of Iceland's most popular cars that year.

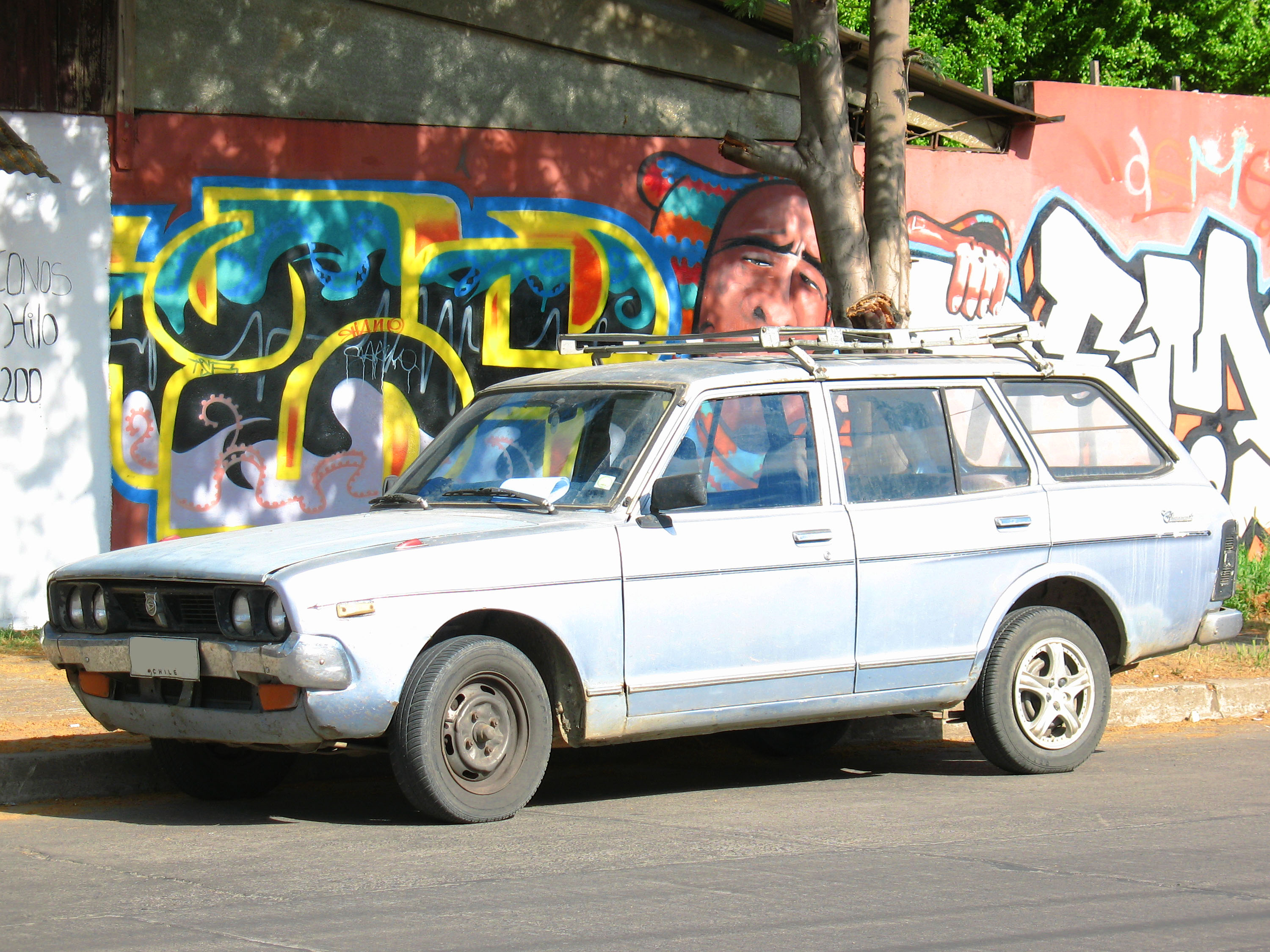
1976–1978 Daihatsu Charmant 1600 estate (A40V; Chile)

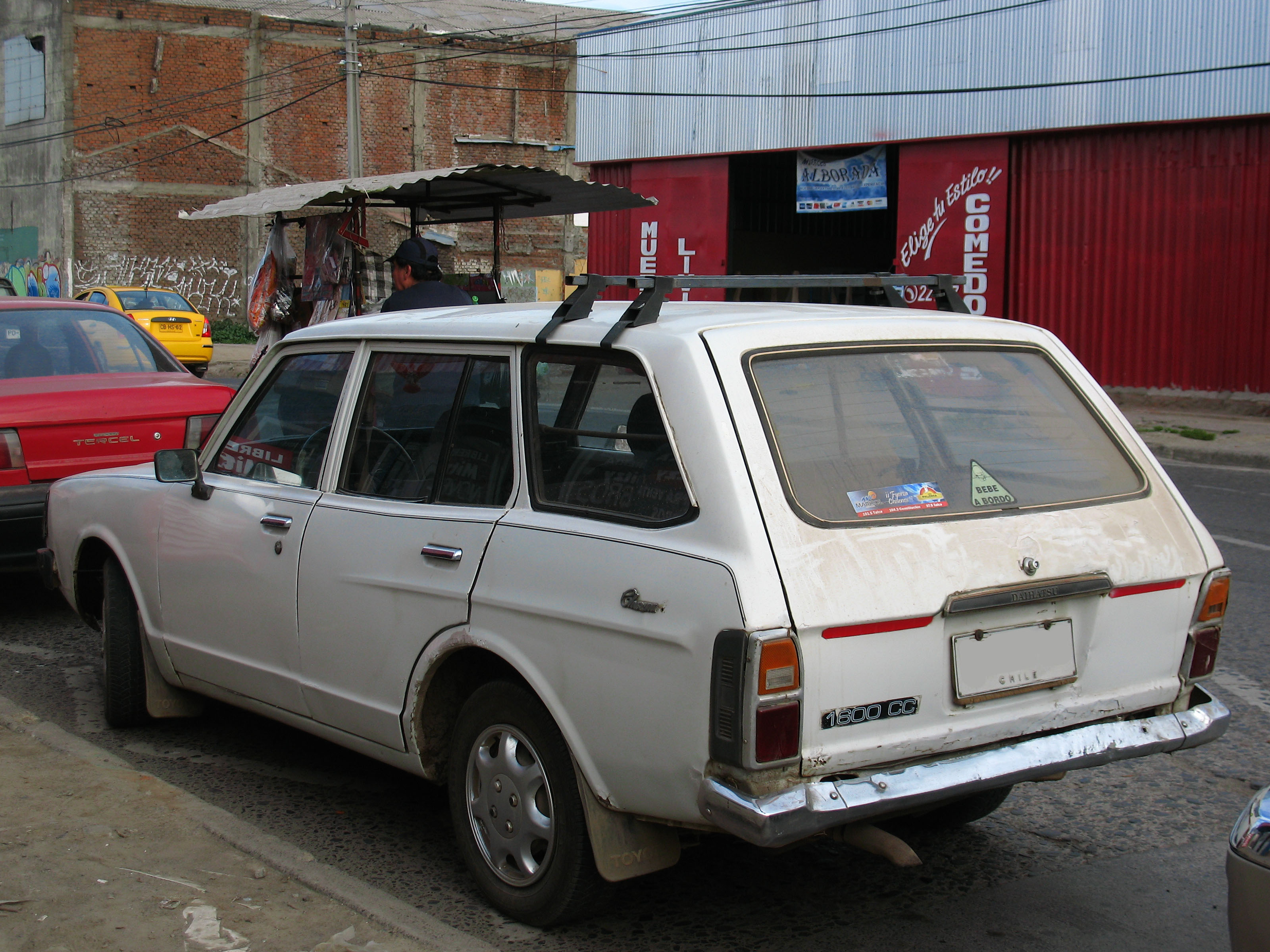
Rear view of the estate (Chile)

1978–1981 Daihatsu Charmant 1600 saloon (A40; Europe)

== Second generation (A35/A45/A55/A60; 1981–1988) ==
Daihatsu Charmant
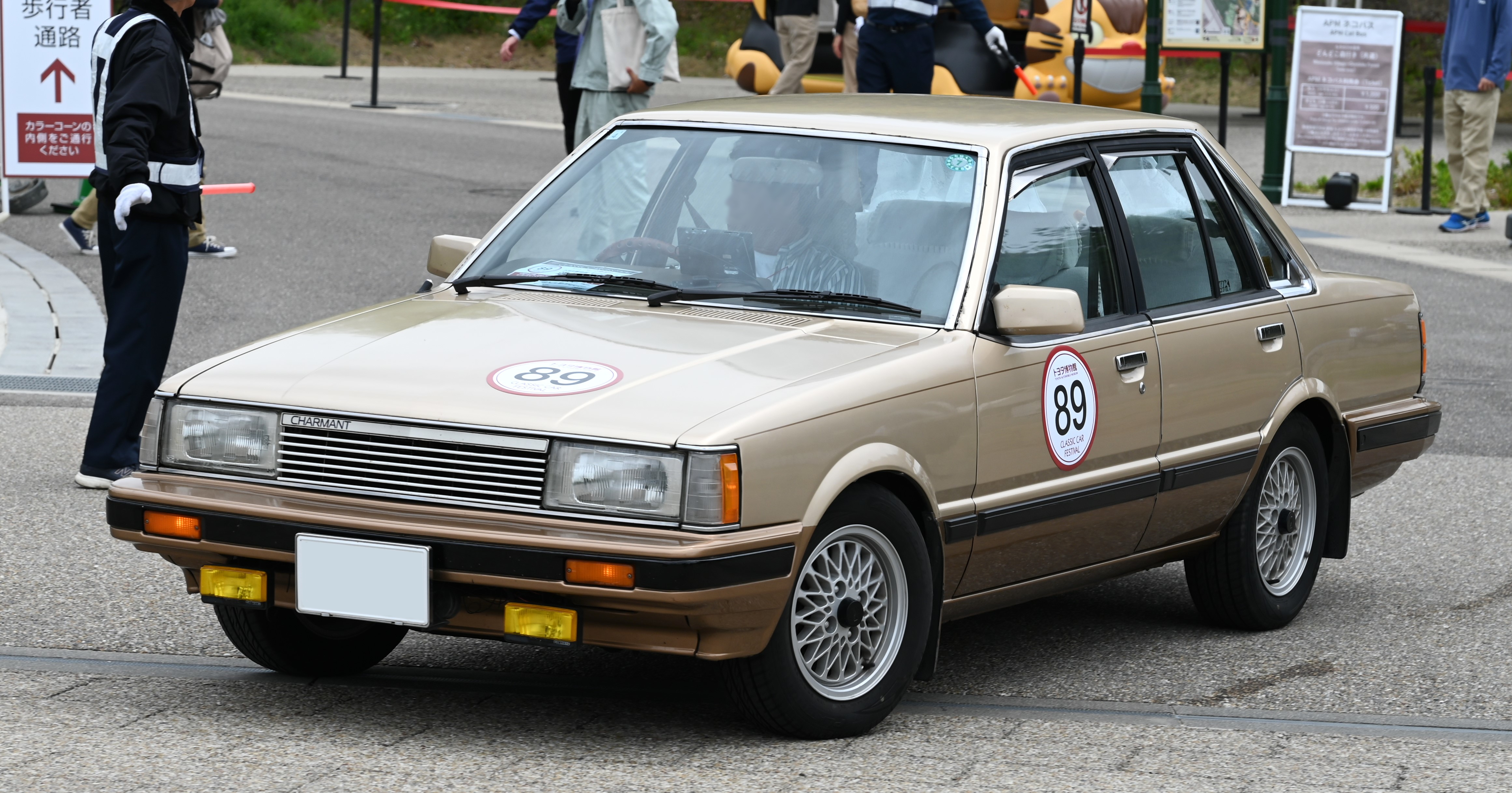
- 1984–1988 Daihatsu Charmant 1500 Altair G (A55; Japan)

Overview
- Manufacturer: Daihatsu
- Model code: A35/45/55/60
- Production: 1981–1988
- Assembly: Ōyamazaki, Kyoto (Kyoto Plant), Japan; Sunter (PT Daihatsu Indonesia), Indonesia; Petaling Jaya (Daihatsu Malaysia Sdn. Bhd), Malaysia

Body and chassis
- Body style: 4-door saloon
- Related: Toyota Corolla (E70); Toyota Sprinter (E70); Toyota Corolla Levin/Sprinter Trueno (TE71)/AE85/AE86)

Powertrain
- Engine: 1.3 L 4K/4K-U OHV I4 (A35); 1.5 L 3A-U SOHC I4 (A55); 1.6 L 2T OHV I4 (A45); 1.6 L 4A SOHC I4 (A60)
- Transmission: 3-speed A40 automatic; 4-speed A42DL automatic; 4-speed K40/T40 manual; 5-speed K50/T50 manual

Dimensions
- Wheelbase: 2,400 mm (94.5 in)
- Length: 4,150–4,200 mm (163.4–165.4 in) (pre-facelift); 4,200–4,275 mm (165.4–168.3 in) (facelift)
- Width: 1,620–1,625 mm (63.8–64.0 in)
- Height: 1,380 mm (54.3 in)
- Curb weight: 815–915 kg (1,796.8–2,017.2 lb)

A new Charmant was launched at the Frankfurt Motor Show in September 1981 with new squarer bodywork that was somewhat outmoded already when being introduced, as was its front-engine, rear-wheel drive layout. Due to Daihatsu's unfamiliarity with the process of presenting new cars in Frankfurt, the car was omitted from most official press releases and several automobile writers overlooked the fact that there was a new car on Daihatsu's stand.

Trim levels were commonly called LD, LC, LE and LGX – not all market received all of these trim levels. In Japan, there was an additional trim level below the LGX called LGF and a top trim called Altair. The only bodywork available was a four-door saloon, while the estate/van model no longer available. Unlike the Toyota Corolla (E70) on which the Charmant was based, it featured a six-window saloon body style, as opposed to the four-window style found on the Corolla. There were two bumper options on this model, short bumpers for lower models and 50 millimetres (2 in) longer ones equipped with shock absorbers for the top model. For the early model, the lower models were equipped with a rack and pinion steering system, while top models retained the older recirculating ball system. The Charmant had an independent front suspension (MacPherson strut) with a stabilizer bar, and a live four-link rear axle with a panhard rod. Suspension settings were soft, for maximum comfort.

In Japan, the biggest engine was now an SOHC 1.5-litre (1453 cc) 3A-U with 80 PS (59 kW; 79 hp) gross. In the export, the OHV 1.6-litre (1588 cc) 2T engine from previous generation was retained, producing 75 PS (55 kW; 74 hp) net. The smaller OHV 1.3-litre (1290 cc) 4K engine was also retained for the lower models, produced between 60 and 65 PS (44 and 48 kW; 59 and 64 hp) (depending on the compressor ratio) in net form for international model and 74 PS (54 kW; 73 hp) gross (4K-U) for the Japanese market. All of theses engines were mated to four/five-speed manual or three-speed automatic transmissions.

The saloon underwent its first facelift in Japan in August 1983, the trim levels were revised with the removal of the LD and LGF trims, while the Altair trim was split into the Altair L and Altair G. The wing mirrors were moved from the front fenders to the doors for the 1.5-litre models, the instrument panel was refreshed, the base horizontal 2-spoke steering wheel was removed, a new front grille was adopted (except for the Altair trims), a rack and pinion steering system became standard, and new optional 14-inch alloy wheels. The power of the 1.5-litre engine was also increased to 83 PS (61 kW; 82 hp) gross, which can now be combined with a 4-speed automatic transmission option specifically for the Altair L trim. The second facelift appeared in 1984 with the adoption of an even longer, more modern-looking bumpers for the 1.5-litre models, while bumpers with shock absorbers became standard for the 1.3-litre models, a four-speed automatic transmission option for Altair G trim, and the removal of 4-speed manual transmission option. The export models also underwent a facelift in autumn 1984, by adopting almost the same updates as the Japanese version, but with a new grille as standard. The larger engine was also changed to the SOHC 1.6-litre (1587 cc) 4A unit, an enlarged version of 1.5-litre 3A-U engine. A four-speed automatic transmission was also offered for this engine but only for the LGX trim, while the lower LE trim remained with the three-speed unit. Performance improved marginally while the fuel mileage was considerably better. The new engine produces between 76 and 83 PS (56 and 61 kW; 75 and 82 hp) net, depending on the compression ratio and emission control.

The Charmant production ended in late 1987 (but still available for sale until the first half of 1988), while the shared Toyota Corolla platform changed to front-wheel drive in 1983 (although the estate/van continued until July 1987, also built by Daihatsu from September 1984). When the Charmant stopped production, it left Daihatsu without a compact saloon until April and July 1989, when the Charade Social and Applause saloons were introduced to occupy the 1.3-litre subcompact and 1.6-litre compact saloon segments. The facelifted model was also locally assembled with imported knock-down kits from Japan by Daihatsu's overseas subsidiaries in Indonesia and Malaysia from 1984.

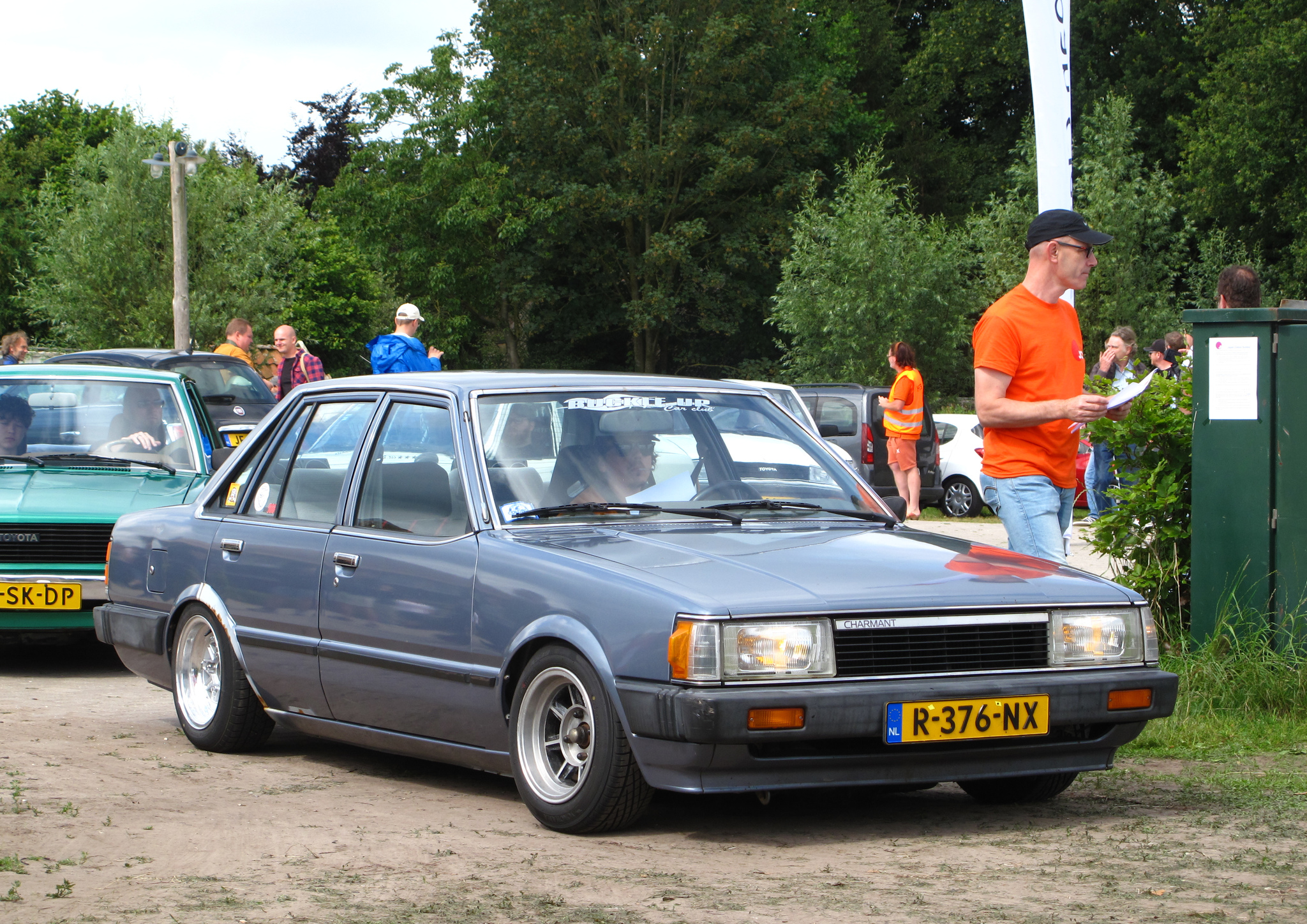
1981–1984 Daihatsu Charmant 1600 LE with shock-arsobing front bumper (A45, Netherlands)

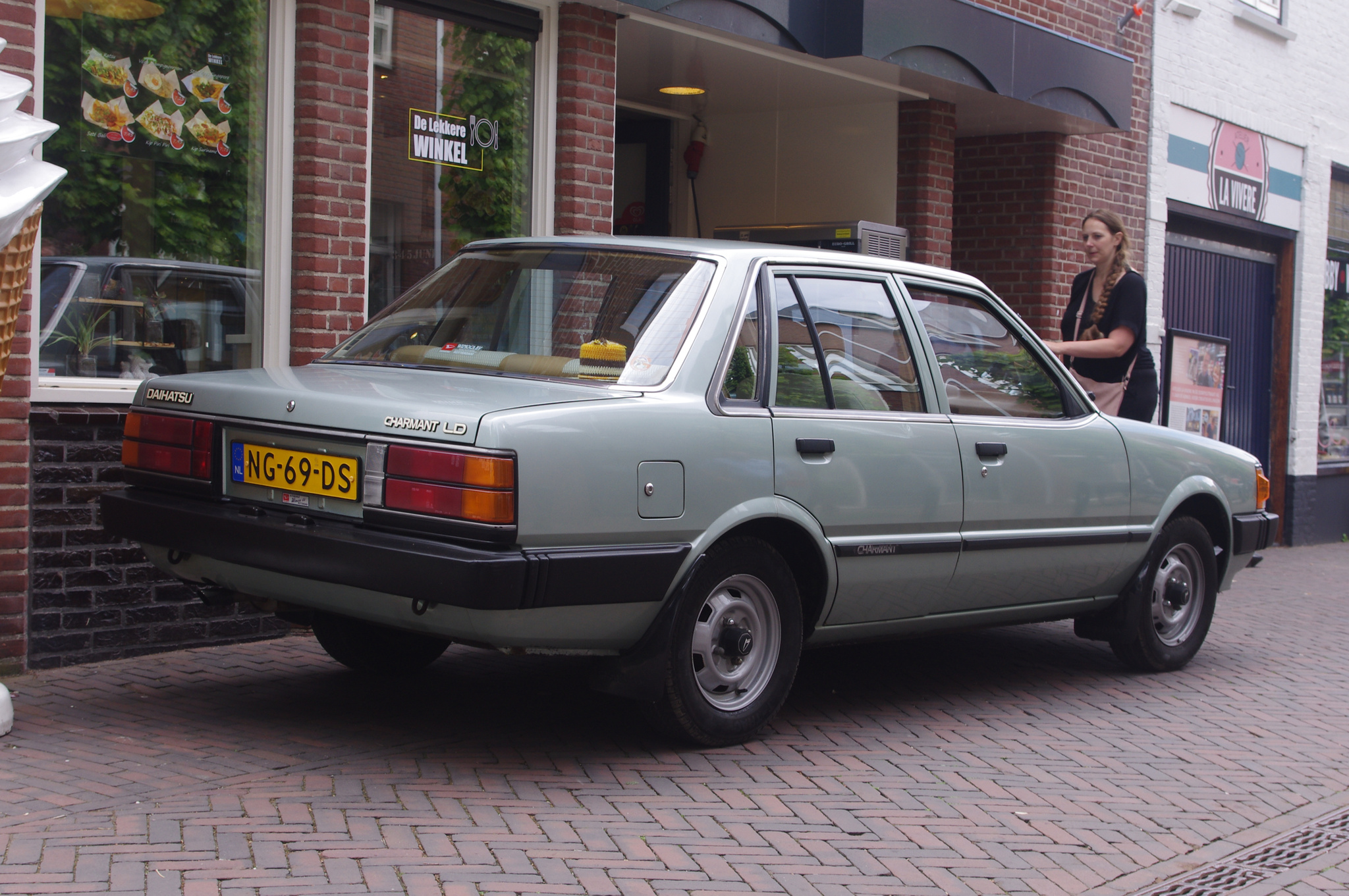
Daihatsu Charmant 1300 LD with shock-arsobing rear bumper (A35, Netherlands)

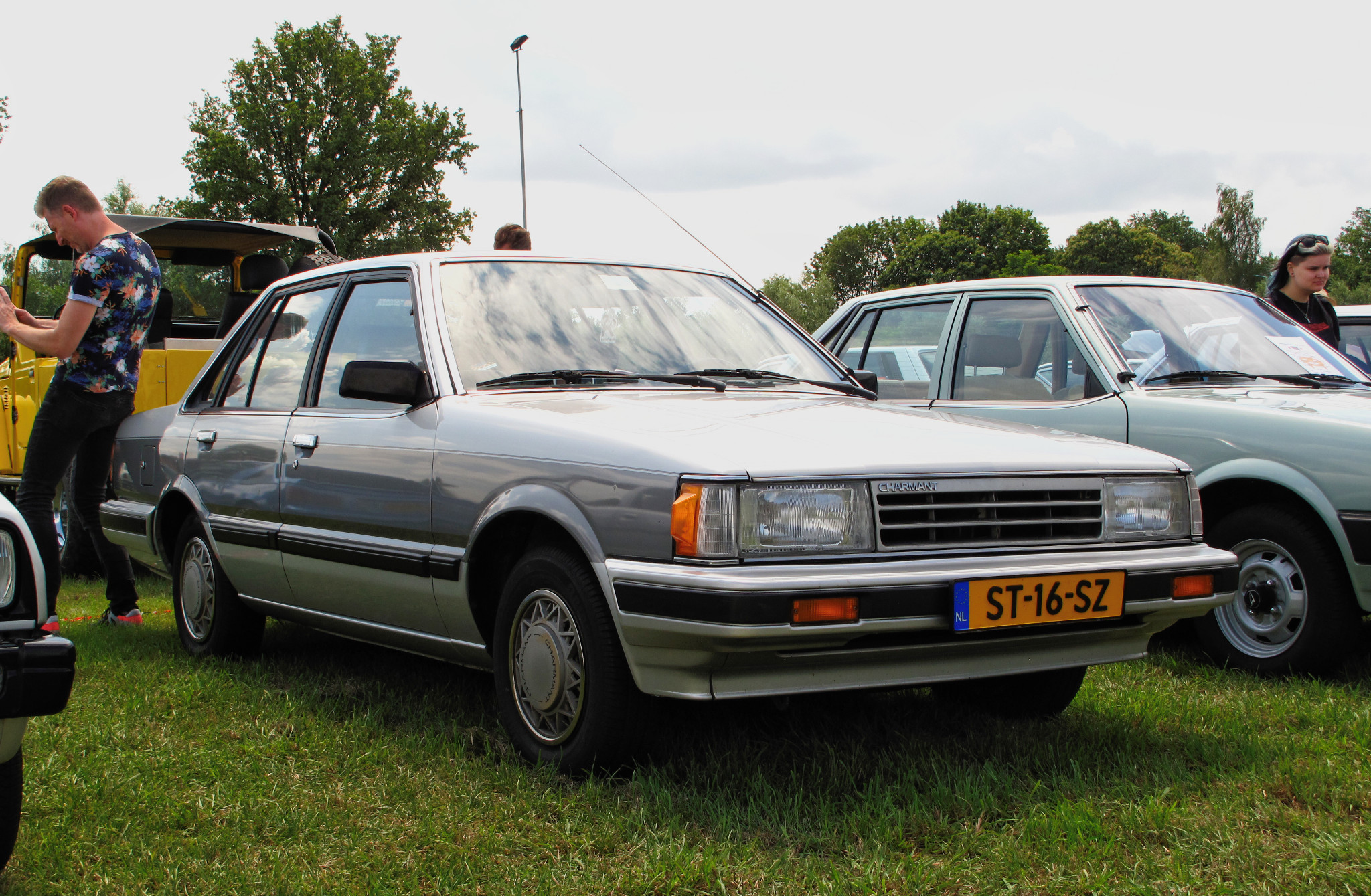
1984–1988 Daihatsu Charmant 1300 LC (A35, Netherlands)

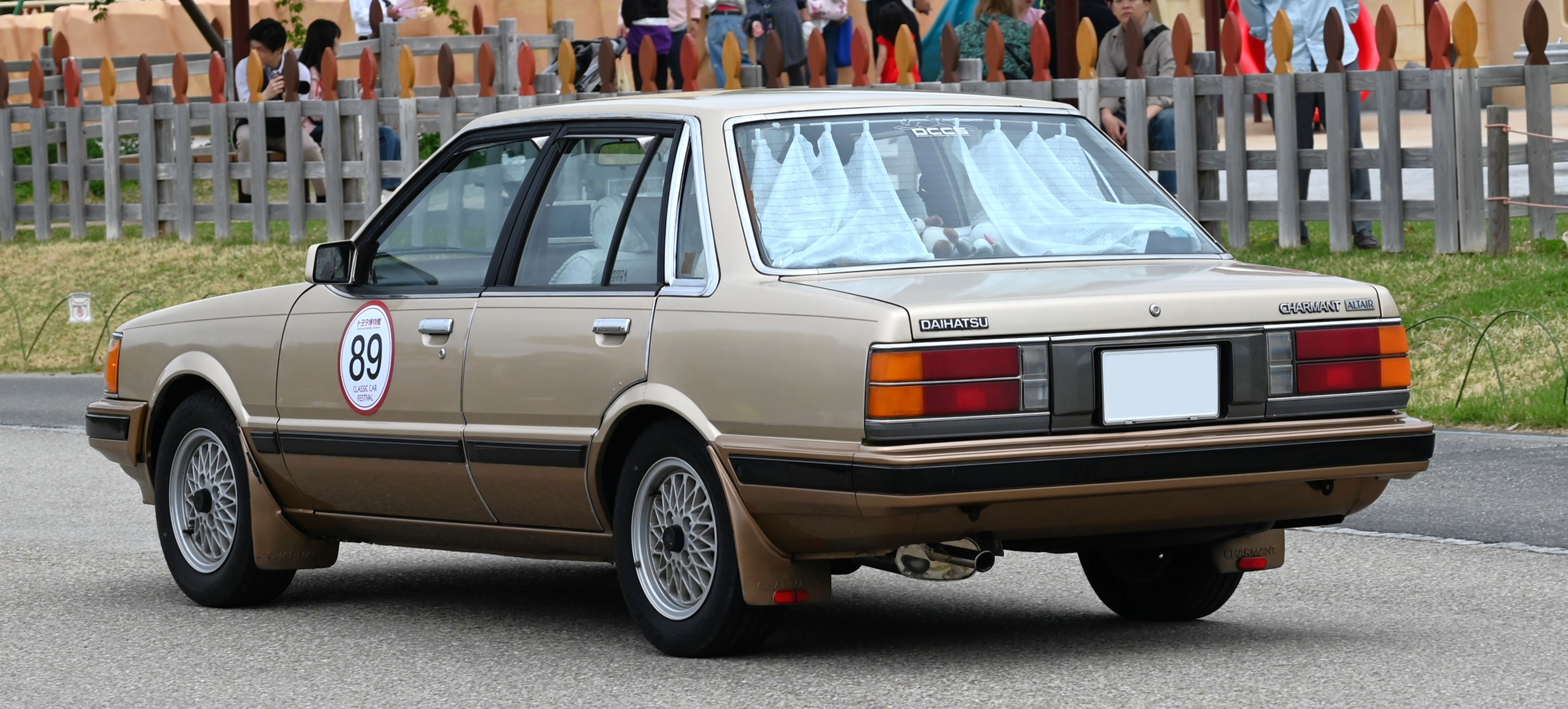
1984–1988 Daihatsu Charmant 1500 Altair G (A55, Japan)

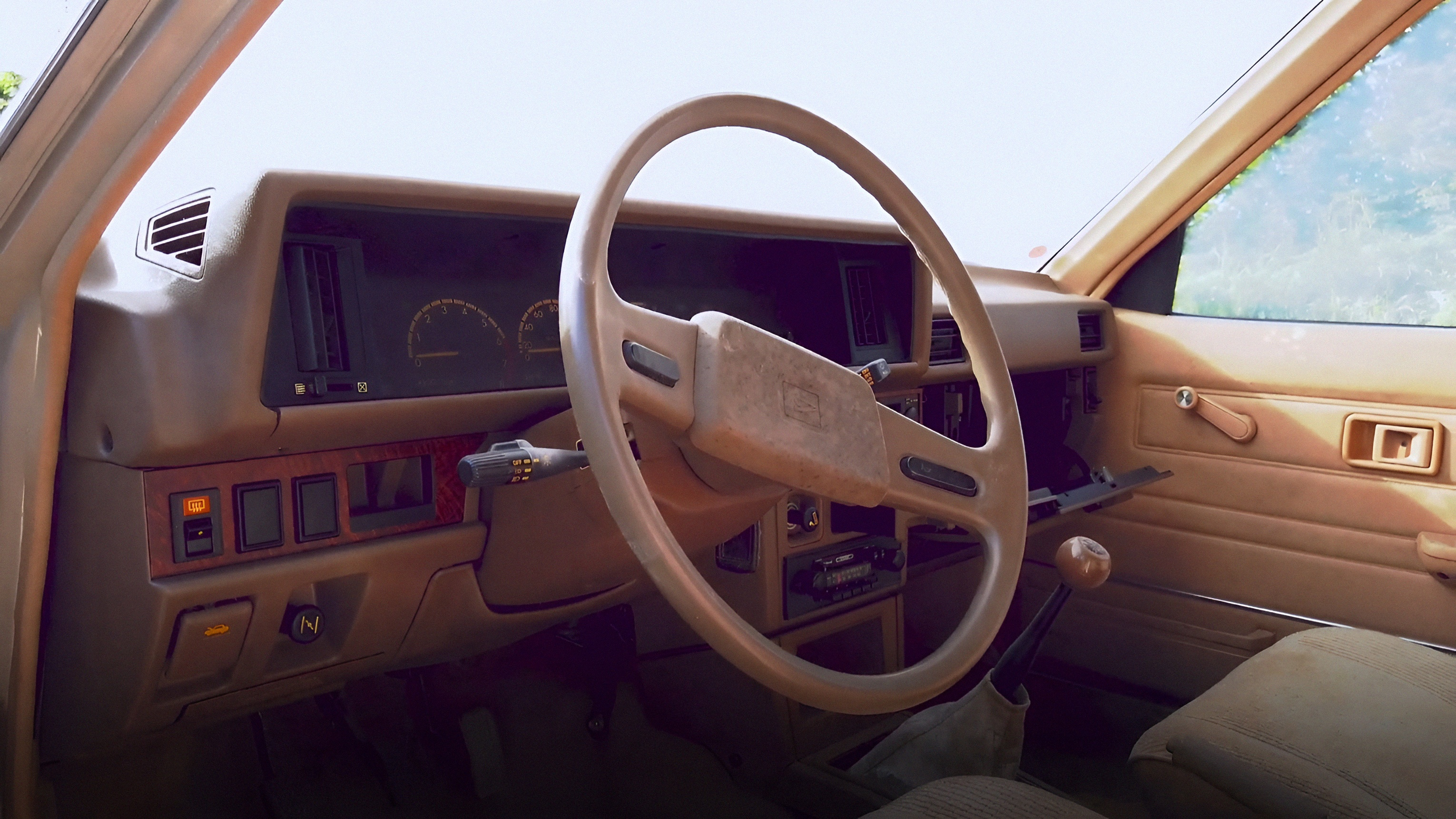
1984–1988 export markets base model interior

== See also ==
- List of Daihatsu vehicles
