= KKK (disambiguation) =

KKK or kkk may refer to:

== Organizations ==
- Ku Klux Klan, an American white supremacist hate group.

=== Politics ===
- Communist Party of Cyprus (Greek: Κομμουνιστικό Κόμμα Κύπρου)
- Katipunan ng Kamalayang Kayumanggi (Society of Brown Consciousness) a Philippine political party
- Kapayapaan, Kaunlaran at Katarungan (Peace, Prosperity and Justice), a local political party based in Manila
- Koma Komalen Kurdistan, a Kurdish political organization

=== Fraternities and sororities ===
- Kappa Pi Kappa, a local, social fraternity at Dartmouth College known as Kappa Kappa Kappa for most of its history
- Ku Klux Klan (honor society), a defunct interfraternity honor society
- Tri Kappa, a women's philanthropic organization based in Indiana

=== Militant ===
- Kalmykian Cavalry Corps (romanized Russian: Kalmyk Kavallerie Korps), a group of volunteer soldiers during World War II
- Katipunan (Kataas-taasang, Kagalang-galangang Katipunan ng̃ mg̃á Anak ng̃ Bayan), a militant society that initiated the Philippine Revolution of 1896
- Turkish Land Forces Command (Turkish: Kara Kuvvetleri Komutanlığı), a division of the Turkish Armed Forces

=== Other organizations ===
- KKK Bosna (or Klizačko Koturaljski Klub Bosna), a skating club from Sarajevo, Bosnia, and part of USD Bosna
- Japan Foundation (Japanese: Kokusai Kōryū Kikin), a legal entity to undertake international dissemination of Japanese culture

== Companies ==
- AtlasGlobal (ICAO code: KKK), a Turkish airline
- K Market or KK Market or KKK Supermarket or KKKK Citymarket, former naming for markets in the chain of Kesko in Finland
- Kühnle, Kopp & Kausch, a German turbine manufacturer, now part of Colfax Corporation
- Krümmel Nuclear Power Plant (German: Kernkraftwerk Krümmel)

== Entertainment ==
- Khatron Ke Khiladi (TV series)
- Khatra Khatra Khatra
- Kana Kaanum Kaalangal (2006 TV series)
  - Kana Kaanum Kaalangal (2022 TV series)

== Other uses ==
- "K-K-K-Katy", a 1917 song by Geoffrey O'Hara
- K.K.Kity, a Johnny's Jr. group; here, 'KKK' can also mean "Koyama, Kato and Kusano"
- Kajiri Kamui Kagura, a Japanese visual novel game
- Kalakaket Creek Air Station (IATA: KKK), Alaska
- Khatron Ke Khiladi (disambiguation)
- Kimantha, Kenzie and Kaitlin of the American TV series Suburgatory
- Kinder, Küche, Kirche, a German expression about a family model considered to be traditional
- KKK, the production code for the 1972 Doctor Who serial Day of the Daleks

== See also ==
- Alternative political spellings using "KKK"; see Satiric misspelling § KKK replacing c or k
- K (disambiguation)
- KK (disambiguation)
- KKKK (disambiguation)
- KKKKK (disambiguation)
- 3K (disambiguation)
- K3 (disambiguation)
