= K3 =

K3 may refer to:

== Transportation ==
- China Railway K3/4
- K-3 (Kansas highway), a state highway in Kansas
- London Bus route K3
- Taquan Air, an Alaskan commuter airline (by IATA code)
- K-3 cart
- Kia Forte, a compact car sold as Kia K3 in South Korea
- Kia K3 (BL7), a subcompact car
- LNER Class K3, a class of British steam locomotives
- GSWRI Class K3, a Great Southern and Western Railway (Ireland) steam locomotive

== Military ==
=== Weapons ===
- K-3 (rifle), an Armenian-made bullpup rifle
- Daewoo K3, a South Korean light machine gun
- K3 tank, a South Korean Main Battle Tank project

=== Ships ===
- Soviet submarine K-3 Leninsky Komsomol, the first Soviet nuclear submarine
- USS K-3 (SS-34), a 1914 United States Navy K-class submarine
- HMS K3, a 1916 British K-class submarine
- HMS Heliotrope (K03), a 1940 Royal Navy Flower-class corvette

=== Other ===
- Pohang Airport, by United States Air Force designator during the Korean War
- Life Regiment Hussars, Swedish cavalry regiment
- K3, a bombproof WWII submarine pen at the German Lorient Submarine Base in France

== Science, technology, computing and mathematics ==
- The Kleene logic K_{3}
- The complete graph on three vertices $K_3$
- A version of the K (programming language)
- K3 surface, a compact complex surface in mathematics
- Menadione, vitamin K_{3}
- K3, 1774 marine chronometer made by Larcum Kendall
- Pentax K-3, a digital SLR camera

== Media and entertainment ==
- K3 (band), a Belgian/Dutch girl group
- K3 (television), a Catalan television channel
- K3: Prison of Hell, a 2009 pornographic horror film
- K3 Film Festival, a film festival held annually in Villach, Austria, since 2007
- K3, a world in Donkey Kong Country 3: Dixie Kong's Double Trouble!

== Other uses ==
- K3 League, a South Korean football league
- Gasherbrum IV, a mountain in the Karakoram previously surveyed as K3. Sometimes erroneously recorded as Broad Peak.
- Kankakee, Illinois, an expression or abbreviation used to identify Kankakee, IL

== See also ==
- KKK (disambiguation)
- 3K (disambiguation)
