= 3K =

3K or 3-K may refer to:

- 3Kingdoms, a MUD, or text-based online role-playing game
- 3K (comics), an organization in Marvel Comics
- IATA airline designator for Jetstar Asia
- Ku Klux Klan
- 3K (Treći kanal RTS-a), a former channel of Radio Television of Serbia.
- 3K digital film resolutions, see List of common resolutions.
- Kinder, Küche, Kirche
- Kitanai, kiken, and kitsui (Dirty, Dangerous and Demeaning), a class of jobs
- 3000 (number)
- 3K, a Toyota K engine
- 3K Battery
- SSH 3K (WA), see Washington State Route 128
- 3K radiation, see Cosmic microwave background radiation
- PI-3K, see Phosphoinositide 3-kinase
- Python 3K, see Python (programming language)
- F6F-3K Hellcat, a model of Grumman F6F Hellcat
- Mystery Science Theater 3K, see Mystery Science Theater 3000
- 3k, track and field shorthand for 3000 metres
- EIF3K gene
- Jetstar Asia's IATA designator.

== See also ==
- Three Kingdoms (disambiguation)
- 3000 (disambiguation)
- KKK (disambiguation)
- K3 (disambiguation)
