= Consorte =

Consorte may refer to:

- Daihatsu Consorte, a small sedan sold by Japanese automaker Daihatsu
- Giovanni Consorte (born 1948), Italian manager and convicted criminal
