= K5 =

K5, K05 or K-5 may be:

== Places ==
- Gasherbrum I, the 11th highest mountain peak in the world
- K-5 (Kansas highway), a state highway in Kansas
- K5 Plan, vast defensive belt along the Cambodian-Thai border

== Transportation ==
- Kalitta Charters, IATA airline designator
- Kinner K-5, a light general and sport aircraft engine
- Wings of Alaska, former IATA airline designator

=== Vehicles ===
- HMS K5, a Royal Navy submarine sunk in 1921
- HMS Lobelia (K05) or FFL Lobelia (K05), a 1940 British Royal Navy then Free French Navy Flower-class corvette
- USS K-5 (SS-36), a 1914 United States Navy K-class submarine
- PRR K5, a 1929 American experimental 4-6-2 "Pacific" type steam locomotive
- LNER Class K5, a class of British steam locomotives
- GSR Class K5, an 1894 Irish steam locomotive
- Chevrolet K5 Blazer, a 1969-91 full size SUV
- Kia Optima, a car branded as K5 in some markets

== Weaponry ==
- Daewoo Precision Industries K5, a pistol used by the South Korean military
- Krupp K5, a railway gun of World War II Germany
- Kaliningrad K-5, a Soviet-era air-to-air missile
- K-5 (SLBM), a submarine-launched ballistic missile

== Technology ==
- AMD K5, a CPU chip released in the 1990s
- Kerberos protocol version 5
- Pentax K-5, a digital SLR camera released in 2010 by Hoya Corporation
- kuro5hin, a collaborative discussion website
- Knightscope, a surveillance robot

== Other ==
- K5 (band), Breakbeat artists
- Ibanez K5, the signature bass for KoRn's bassist Fieldy
- K-5 (education), kindergarten through grade 5
- K_{5}, in graph theory, the complete graph used in Kuratowski's theorem
- KING5, a television station in Seattle, Washington, USA
- The former branding of KFVE-TV (now KHII-TV), a television station in Honolulu, Hawaii
- KHNL, a television station in Honolulu, Hawaii that currently carries "K5" branding on subchannel
- K5 Global, a media and financial investment-advisory firm

== See also ==
- KKKKK (disambiguation)
- 5K (disambiguation)
