= K4 =

K4 or K-4 may refer to:

== Military ==
- Daewoo K4, a South Korean automatic grenade launcher
- HMS K4, a 1915 British K class submarine
- K 4 or Norrland Dragoon Regiment, a Swedish Army cavalry regiment
- K-4 (SLBM), an Indian submarine-launched ballistic missile
- USS K-4 (SS-35), a 1914 United States Navy K-class submarine

== Transport ==
- China Railway K3/4
- K-4 (Kansas highway), a highway in Kansas
- Kalitta Air, IATA code K4, an American cargo airline
- LNER Class K4, a British class of 2-6-0 steam locomotives
- London Buses route K4, a Transport for London contracted bus route
- PRR K4s or Pennsylvania Railroad Type K4, a class of American 4-6-2 steam locomotives
- Kia K4 (2025), a compact car successor to a Kia Forte
- Kia K4 (China), a Chinese compact car by Dongfeng Yueda Kia

== Other uses ==
- K4, a four-man sprint kayak
- K4, a model of the British red telephone box
- K4, a normal modal logic
- K_{4}, in graph theory, the complete graph of four vertices
- K_{4}, in abstract algebra, the Klein four-group
- K4 (mountain) or Gasherbrum II, a mountain between China and Pakistan
- Kawai K4, a digital synthesizer
- Koalisyon ng Katapatan at Karanasan sa Kinabukasan (K4, Coalition of Truth and Experience for Tomorrow), a Philippine political coalition
- K4, an inscription on the sculpture Kryptos

== See also ==
- KKKK (disambiguation)
