= Daihatsu Consorte =

Daihatsu Consorte (EP)
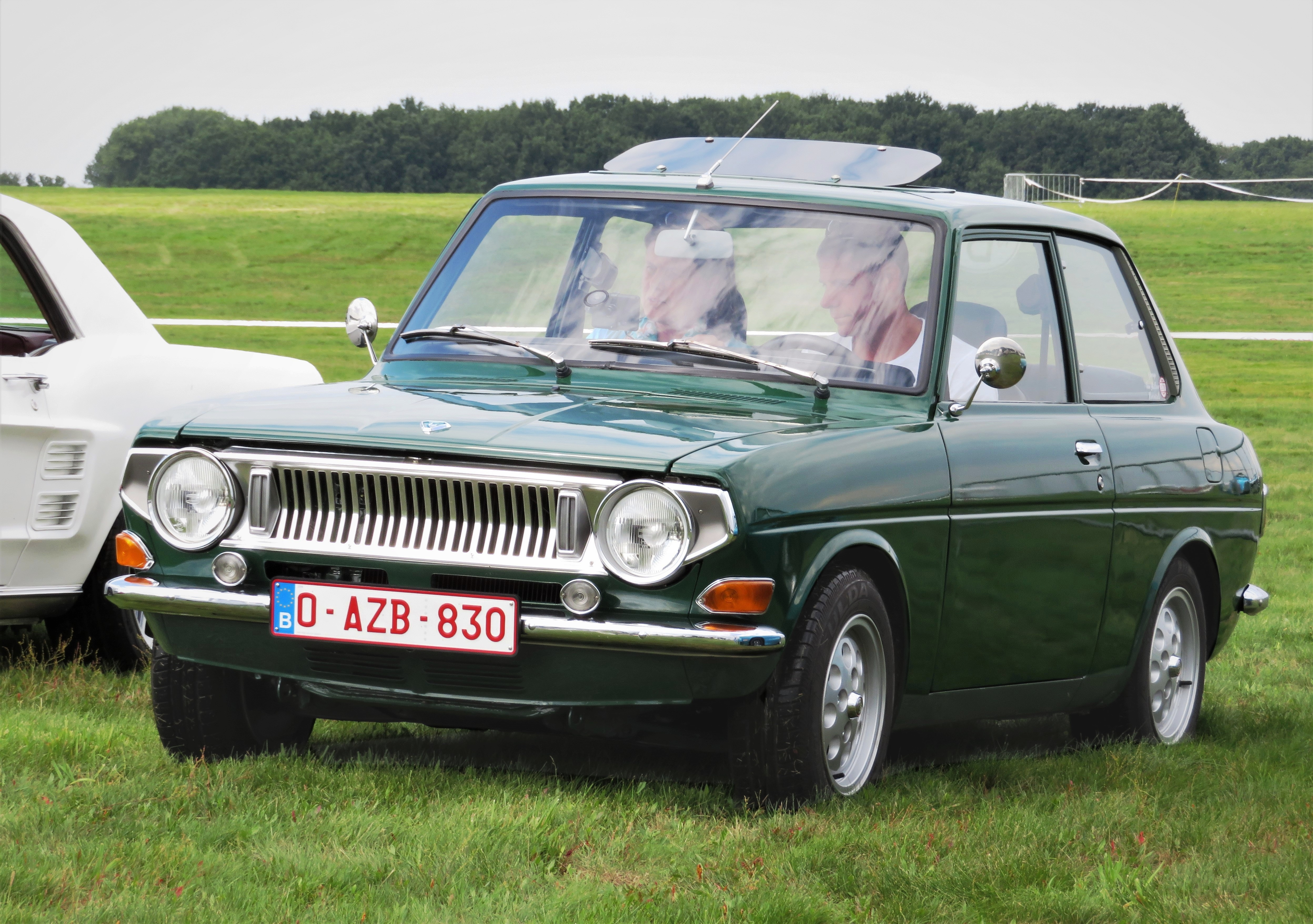
- P30 Toyota 1000, similar in model to the Consorte

Overview
- Manufacturer: Daihatsu
- Model code: EP30/31/45/47/51
- Also called: Toyota Publica (P30) (2-door sedan); Toyota Starlet (P40/50) (coupé/4-door sedan)
- Production: 1969–1977
- Assembly: Ikeda, Osaka, Japan

Body and chassis
- Class: Subcompact
- Body style: 2-door sedan (1969–1977); 2-door coupé (1973–1977); 4-door sedan (1973–1974)
- Layout: FR layout
- Platform: Toyota P

Powertrain
- Engine: 958 cc FE OHV I4 (EP30/45); 1166 cc 3K/3K-U OHV I4 (EP31/47/51)
- Transmission: 4-speed manual K40; 5-speed manual K50; 2-speed automatic A20

Dimensions
- Wheelbase: 2,160 mm (85.0 in) (2-door sedan); 2,265 mm (89.2 in) (coupé/4-door-sedan)
- Length: 3,645–3,695 mm (143.5–145.5 in) (2-door sedan); 3,790 mm (149.2 in) (coupé/4-door sedan)
- Width: 1,450 mm (57.1 in) (sedan); 1,530 mm (60.2 in) (coupé)
- Height: 1,310–1,325 mm (51.6–52.2 in) (coupé); 1,345 mm (53.0 in) (4-door sedan); 1,380–1,385 mm (54.3–54.5 in) (2-door sedan)
- Curb weight: 670–745 kg (1,477–1,642 lb) (2-door sedan); 740–770 kg (1,631–1,698 lb) (4-door sedan); 720–750 kg (1,587–1,653 lb) (coupé)

Chronology
- Predecessor: Daihatsu Compagno
- Successor: Daihatsu Charade (2-door sedan/coupé); Daihatsu Charmant (4-door sedan)

The Daihatsu Consorte is a subcompact car sold by the Japanese automaker Daihatsu from 1969 to 1977. It was based on the Toyota Publica, and its name, meaning "consort" in Italian, reflected Daihatsu's newly established affiliation with Toyota while also continuing the theme started with the preceding Compagno ("companion").

The Consorte was a badge engineering of P30 Toyota Publica and was sold at the Toyota Corolla Store (previously called Toyota Publica Store until 1966 when the E10 Toyota Corolla appeared), a dealership network intended to exclusively sell small cars. This arrangement allowed Toyota to sell the Publica at recently acquired Daihatsu dealerships, giving Daihatsu a new regular car larger than kei class cars.

Unlike the Toyota Publica which was offered as 2-door sedan, 2-door pickup truck and 3-door wagon/van, the Consorte was only available as a 2-door sedan. The Consorte used a Daihatsu's in-house 1.0 L "FE" engine from the Compagno (while the Publica is powered by Toyota's 0.8–1.1 L engines) and mated to a 4-speed manual transmission.

== Early years ==
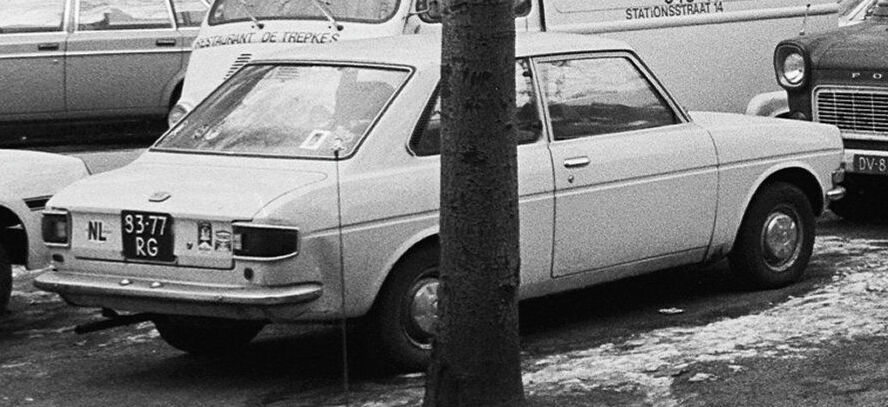
Rear view (Toyota 1000)

Introduced in April 1969, the "Consorte Berlina" (adopting the Berlina (Italian for sedan) designation from the outgoing Compagno 2/4-door sedans) was offered in two models; Standard and Deluxe. A minor facelift occurred in September 1970 with the refreshed front grille, new dashboard, gear ratio revision and a new top model called Super Deluxe with a standard front disc brake.

In June 1971, the second facelift was released with another front grille makeover and an additional Toyota's 1.2 L "3K" engine and 4-speed "K40" manual transmission, exclusively for the new sporty S model. Unlike the Publica, the higher output twin carburetors 1.2 L "K-B/BR" engines were not offered for the Consorte.

== New body styles ==
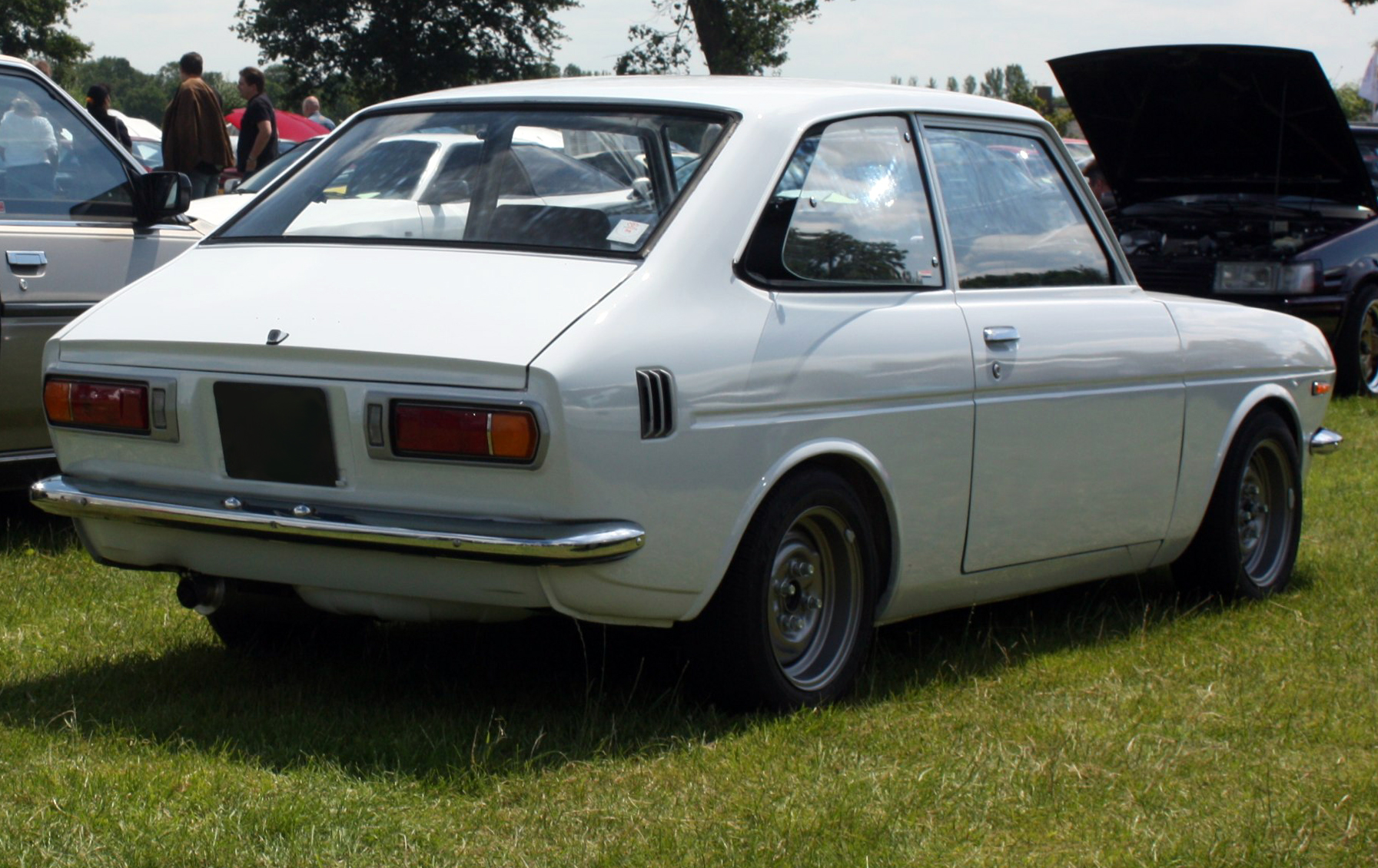
New fastback body style of P30 Toyota 1000, similar to the Consorte

Just like the Publica, the Consorte also received a heavy revision with the new fastback body style in January 1972, which also added extra 50 mm (2.0 in) to the body length. The "Berlina" designation was also dropped, renaming the sporty S trim to GS and an additional new sporty model with 1.0 L engine called PS.

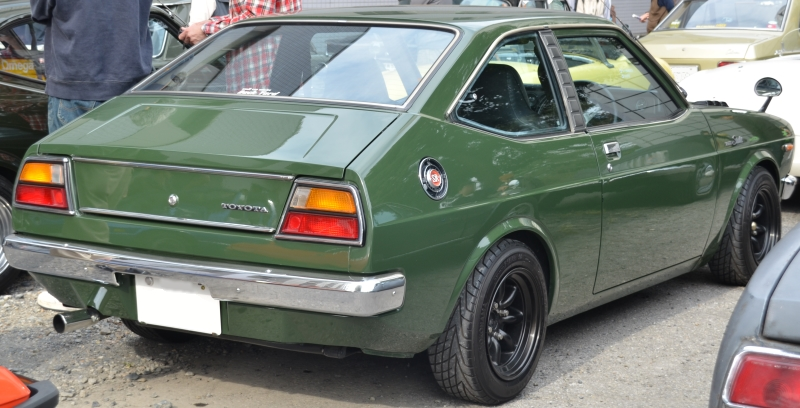

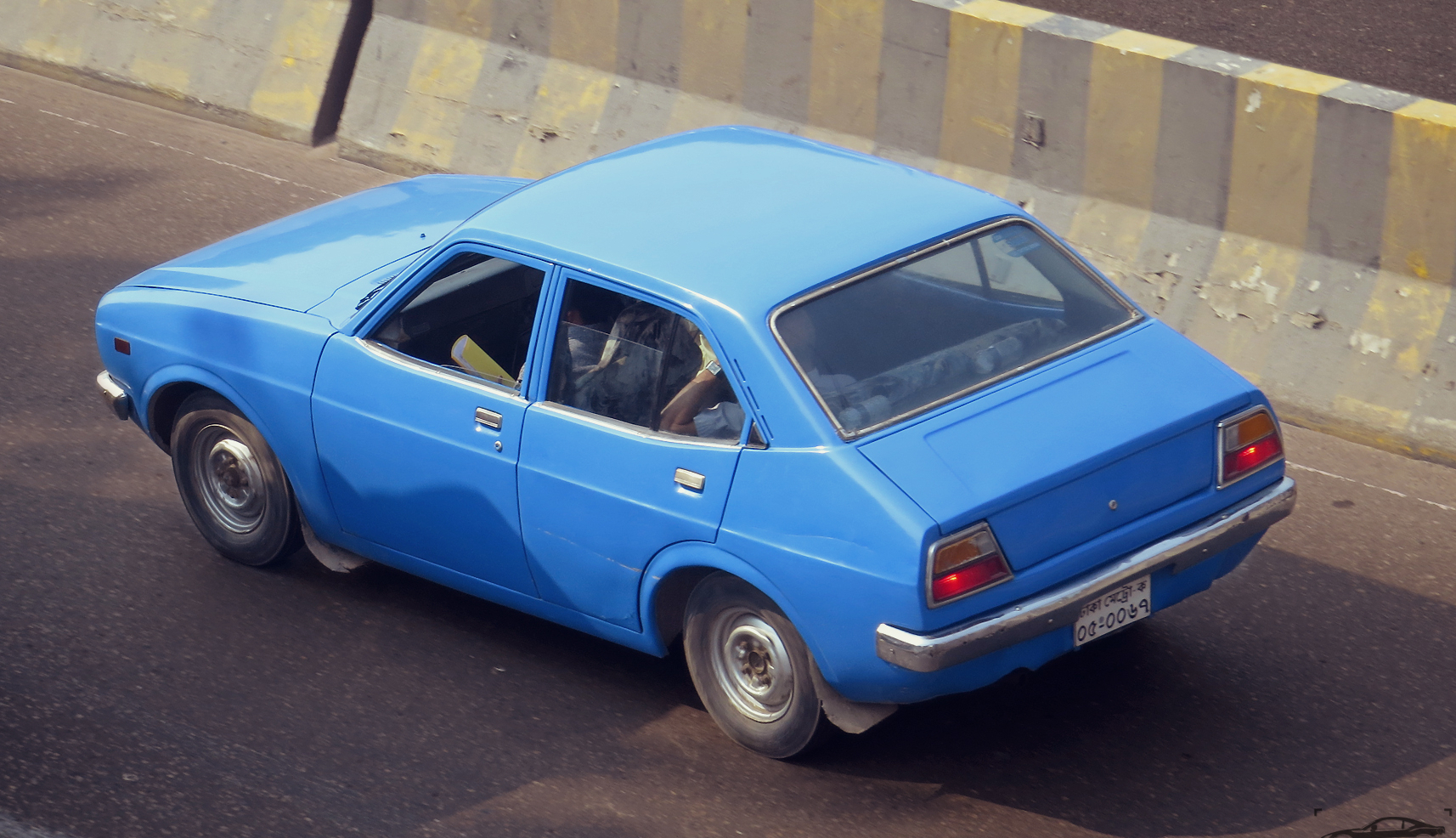
Rear view of coupé and 4-door sedan of P40/50 Toyota Starlet, nearly identical to the Consorte version

In May 1973, the recently introduced P40 Toyota Starlet coupé was also added to Consorte line up. The 1.0 L model was offered as HL and TL, while the 1.2 L model was marketed as GL and GHL. Both 1.0 and 1.2 L engines and 4-speed manual transmissions from the 2-door were also retained. However, a 5-speed "K50" manual and a 2-speed "A20" automatic transmissions are also available as option for 1.2 L models. A 4-door sedan variant of the P40 Toyota Starlet was also added 7 months later in October 1973 with the resurrected of "Berlina" designation. It is marketed as Standard, Deluxe and Super Deluxe and additional Custom and Hi-Costom models, while the sporty GS and PS 2-door sedan models were discontinued. However, due the introduction of the Charmant (a badge engineering of E20 Corolla/Sprinter), the 4-door sedan model was discontinued 13 months later in November 1974.

The final facelift was given to the 2-door sedan in December 1975, along with the revised emissions control for the 1.0 L engine. In February 1976, the 1.2 L engine was revised to the less polluting "3K-U" version due the strict emissions standard at the time. A year later, the 1.0 L "FE" engine was dropped from the line up as it was not able to pass the strict emission standard. The HL coupé model was also dropped. The Consorte was discontinued in November, succeeded by the G10 Charade hatchback.

== See also ==
- List of Daihatsu vehicles
