= 5K =

5K or 5-K may refer to:

- 5K resolution, a display resolution with horizontal resolution on the order of 5,000 pixels
- 5K Broadcasting Network, a Philippine broadcasting company
- Gnome-Rhône 5K, a radial aircraft engine
- 5000 metres, a long-distance running event in track and field
- 5K run, a long-distance road running competition
- Hi Fly (airline) (IATA airline designator)
- Five Ks in Sikhism, five items that Khalsa Sikhs are commanded to wear at all times
- Sander Kleinenberg Presents 5K, 2010 album by Dutch DJ Sander Kleinenberg
- Nightmare of Eden (production code: 5K), a 1979 Doctor Who serial

== See also ==
- 5000 (disambiguation)
- KKKKK (disambiguation)
- K5 (disambiguation)
