= 4000 series (disambiguation) =

4000 series is an industry-standard family of integrated circuits.

4000 series may also refer to:

== Japanese train types ==
- Fukuoka Subway 4000 series electric multiple unit
- Meitetsu 4000 series electric multiple unit
- Odakyu 4000 series electric multiple unit
- Seibu 4000 series electric multiple unit
- Tokyu 4000 series electric multiple unit
- Yokohama Municipal Subway 4000 series electric multiple unit

== Other uses ==
- Avaya ERS 4000 series, a series of Ethernet routers
- Avaya VSP 4000 series, a series of Ethernet routers
- Busan Transportation Corporation 4000 series people mover for the Busan Metro
- CTA 4000 series, a series of Chicago "El" rolling stock
- GEC 4000 series, a series of minicomputers
- HP LaserJet 4000 series, a series of printers
- International 4000 series, a series of trucks
- International 4000 series (1989), a series of trucks
- Port Authority 4000-series PCC, a series of streetcar
- Radeon HD 4000 series, a series of graphics processing unit
- Seoul Metro 4000 series, a series of Seoul Metro train.

== See also ==
- 4000 (disambiguation)
