= KKKKK =

KKKKK may refer to:

- K.K.K.K.K. (album), a 1998 album by Kahimi Karie
- KKKKK (record), a B-side released by Panda Bear off the 2007 single Carrots (song)
- "KKKKK" (rating), the top review rating from webzine Kerrang!

== See also ==
- The Five Ks, a concept in Sikhism
- K (disambiguation)
- KK (disambiguation)
- KKK (disambiguation)
- KKKK (disambiguation)
- 5K (disambiguation)
- K5 (disambiguation)
