= KKKK =

KKKK may refer to:

- Kandukondain Kandukondain, a 2000 Tamil musical and romantic film based on Jane Austen's novel Sense and Sensibility
- The Knights of the Ku Klux Klan, an independent chapter of the Ku Klux Klan
- KHKX, a radio station (99.1 FM), licensed to serve Odessa, Texas, which held the call sign KKKK from 1977 until 1998
- KMMZ, a radio station (101.3 FM), licensed to serve Crane, Texas, which held the call sign KKKK from 1998 to 2004
- KFCS, a radio station (1580 AM) licensed to serve Colorado Springs, Colorado, which held the call sign KKKK from 2005 to 2010
- KPOM-LP, a defunct low-power Class A television station (Ch. 6 analog) formerly licensed to serve Indio, California, United States, which held the call sign KKKK-CA from 2012 to 2013

== See also ==
- K (disambiguation)
- KK (disambiguation)
- KKK (disambiguation)
- KKKKK (disambiguation)
- 4K (disambiguation)
- K4 (disambiguation)
- K (disambiguation)
