= Toyota TTC =

Motor vehicle emission control system

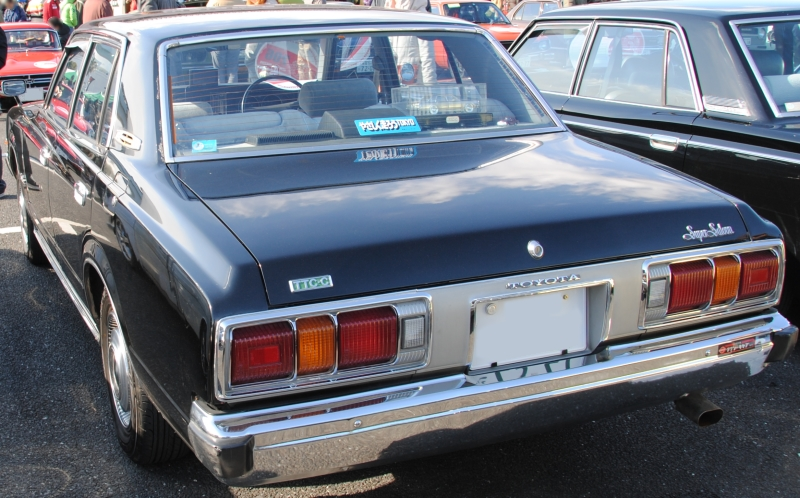
Toyota Crown with "TTC-C" badge on trunklid

Toyota TTC (Toyota Total Clean System) is a moniker used in Japan to identify vehicles built with emission control technology. This technology was installed so that vehicles would comply with Japanese emission regulations passed in 1968. The term was introduced in Japan and included an externally mounted badge on the trunk of equipped vehicles.

== History ==
The technology first appeared in January 1975 on the Toyota Crown, Toyota Corona Mark II, Toyota Corona, Toyota Chaser, Toyota Carina, Toyota Corolla, and Toyota Sprinter. There were three different versions initially introduced: TTC-C for Catalyst (installing a catalytic converter), TTC-V for Vortex (installing an exhaust gas recirculation valve), and TTC-L for Lean Burn (using a lean burn method). As Toyota's technology evolved, the three systems were eventually used in conjunction in future models.

The TTC-V was a licensed copy of Honda's CVCC system and was introduced in February 1975. It was only available in the Carina and Corona lines, and only on the 19R engine, a modified 18R. From March 1976, the TTC-V system was upgraded to meet the stricter 1976 emissions standards. The TTC-V engine was discontinued in 1977. The "Vortex" approach was also used with Mitsubishi's MCA-Jet technology, with Mitsubishi installing an extra valve in the cylinder head, as opposed to Honda's pre-chamber approach.

Toyota installed its emission control technology in select Daihatsu vehicles, as Toyota was a part owner. The system was labeled "DECS" (Daihatsu Economical Cleanup System). The first version to be installed was the DECS-C (catalyst) in the Daihatsu Charmant and the Consorte. As the Japanese emissions regulations continued to be tightened, the DECS-C system was replaced by the DECS-L (lean burn) method, which was also installed in the Daihatsu Fellow, on the Daihatsu A-series engine, the Daihatsu Charade, and the Daihatsu Delta.

== See also ==
- Vehicle emissions control
