= K3 tank =

South Korean main battle tank prototype

K3
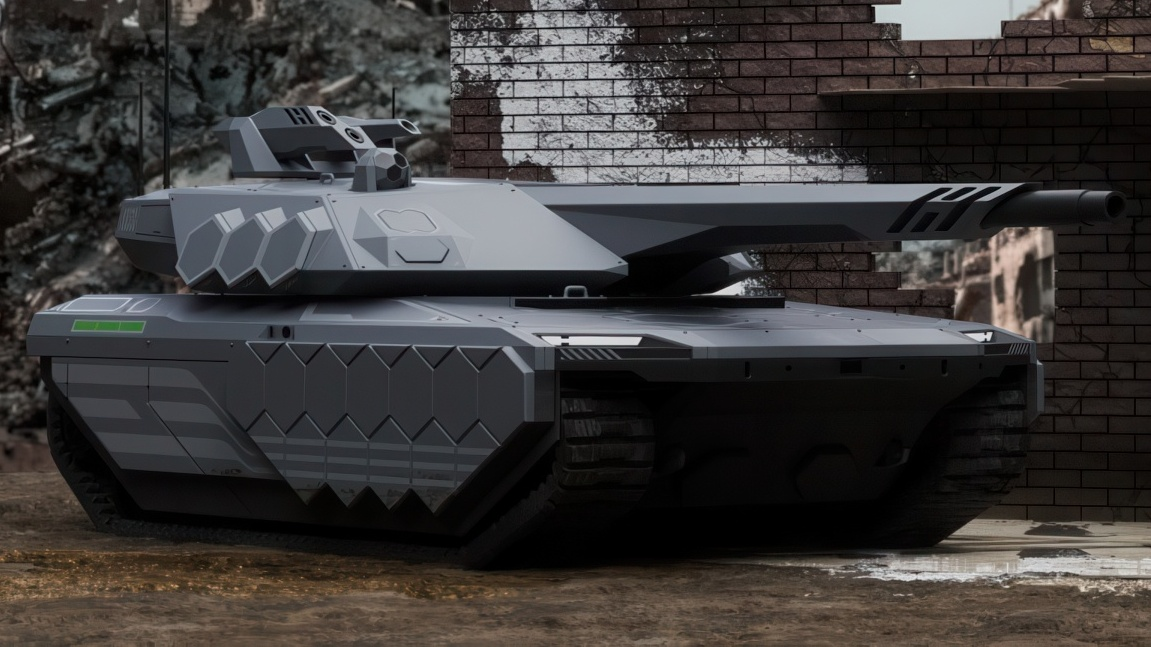
- Type: Main battle tank
- Place of origin: South Korea

Production history
- Designer: Agency for Defense Development, Hyundai Rotem

Specifications
- Crew: 3 (driver, commander, gunner)
- Main armament: 1 x 130 mm tank gun
- Secondary armament: 1 x 30 mm cannon
- Operational range: 500 km (310 mi)
- Maximum speed: 80 km/h (50 mph)

The K3 tank, officially named the Next-Generation Main Battle Tank (NG-MBT), is a South Korean main battle tank prototype designed to succeed the existing K2 Black Panther. It is currently being developed by Hyundai Rotem and the Agency for Defense Development. The K3 is intended to be hydrogen powered, but earlier models will use both hydrogen and diesel due to technical challenges with hydrogen. The vehicle will also feature an active protection system, drone jammers, infrared sensors, and an unmanned, autoloaded 130 mm smoothbore turret. It is slated for mass production in 2040.
