= 4000 =

4000 or variation, may refer to:

- 4000 (number)
- 4000 BCE, a year in the 4th millennium
- A.D. 4000, the last year of the 4th millennium CE, a century leap year starting on Saturday
- 4000s AD, a decade, century, millennium in the 5th millennium CE
- 4000s BCE, a decade, century, millennium in the 5th millennium BC
- 4000 Hipparchus, an asteroid in the Asteroid Belt, the 4000th asteroid registered
- Mobro 4000, a barge operated by MOBRO
- Weather Star 4000, a computer system used to display local forecasts on The Weather Channel
- Hawker 4000, a supermidsized businessjet
- Delta 4000, a rocket series
- Audi 4000, a compact executive sedan
- 4000 (District of Shkodër), one of the postal codes in Albania
- 4000-series integrated circuits

== See also ==
- 4000 A.D., a science-fiction board game
- 4000 series (disambiguation)
