= Khatron Ke Khiladi =

Khatron Ke Khiladi (transl. Daredevil) may refer to:

- Khatron Ke Khiladi (1988 film), a 1988 Indian Bollywood film starring Dharmendra and Sanjay Dutt
- Khatron Ke Khiladi (2001 film), a 2001 Indian Bollywood film starring Mithun Chakraborty and Raj Babbar
- Fear Factor: Khatron Ke Khiladi, an Indian TV series based on the US TV show Fear Factor
  - Fear Factor: Khatron Ke Khiladi – Made in India, spin-off of Khatron Ke Khiladi
