= K5 (band) =

- Also known as: DJ KJ
- Genres: Breakbeat, Florida breaks
- Members: Kevin Shiver aka DJ KJ
- Past members: Tammy Wright; Tessa Calina; Christian Michaels; Mickey Bono; Tia Lisanne
- Website: http://www.k5music.com/

K5 is a band formed in 1995 by Kevin Shiver.

The song "Passion," on Orlando's Kram Records, received local commercial radio station airplay on 106.7 FM (WXXL). "Passion" reached No. 11 in Central Florida's Top 20. The exposure led to national rotation on other radio networks.

On February 8, 1997, "Passion" placed in the Billboard Hot 100 at position 98. It entered the German charts in 2001 and reached number 53. Along with "Red Alert", "Passion" appeared in the Kevin Smith film Chasing Amy."Chasing Amy - Build Your Own Soundtrack".
