= Toyota K engine =

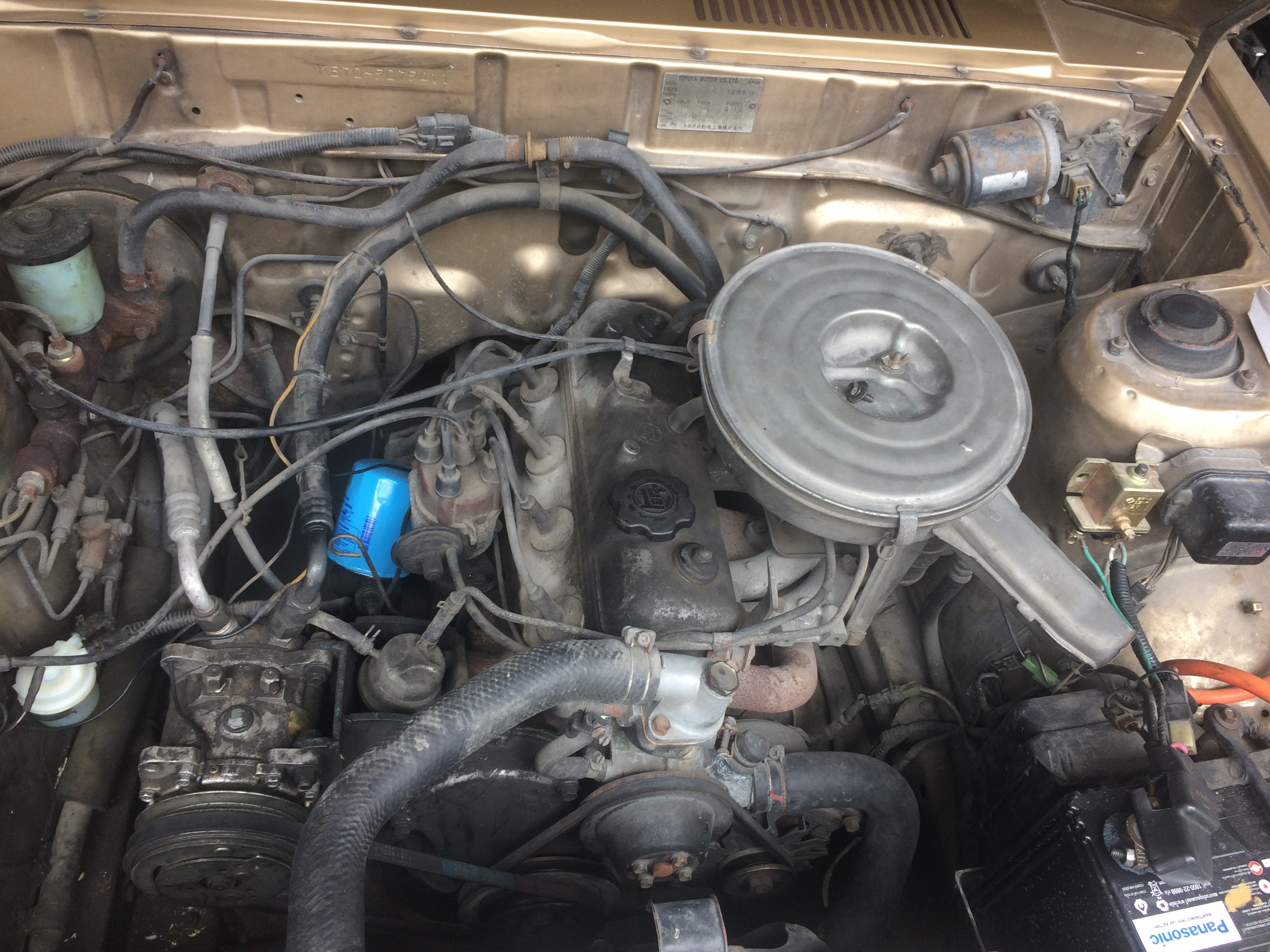
- 4K engine in a Corolla DX

Overview
- Manufacturer: Toyota
- Production: 1966–2007

Layout
- Configuration: Naturally aspirated straight-four
- Cylinder block material: Cast iron
- Cylinder head material: Aluminium alloy
- Valvetrain: OHV 2 valves per cylinder
- Valvetrain drive system: Timing chain

Combustion
- Fuel system: Carburettor; Multi-port fuel injection
- Fuel type: Petrol
- Oil system: Wet sump
- Cooling system: Water-cooled

Output
- Power output: 45–83 PS (33–61 kW; 44–82 hp)
- Torque output: 66–147 N⋅m (7–15 kg⋅m; 49–108 lb⋅ft)

Chronology
- Successor: Toyota E engine (up to 1.3 L models)

The Toyota K series is an inline-four engine that was produced from 1966 through 2007. It is a two-valve pushrod engine design. It was originally built from the Toyota Kamigo plant in Toyota City factory in Japan.

All K series are non-crossflow engines – the inlet and exhaust manifolds are on the same side. They have cast iron blocks and aluminium alloy heads, with a crankshaft supported by five main bearings. K series motors have both hydraulic tappet or hydraulic valve lifters, solid lifters and 1.5 ratio rockers with an adjustment thread for tappet clearance. 7K engines were released with only the hydraulic valve lifters from factory, whereas 4K and 5K engines were made with both hydraulic and solid lifters (depending on year and which model vehicle.)

== K ==
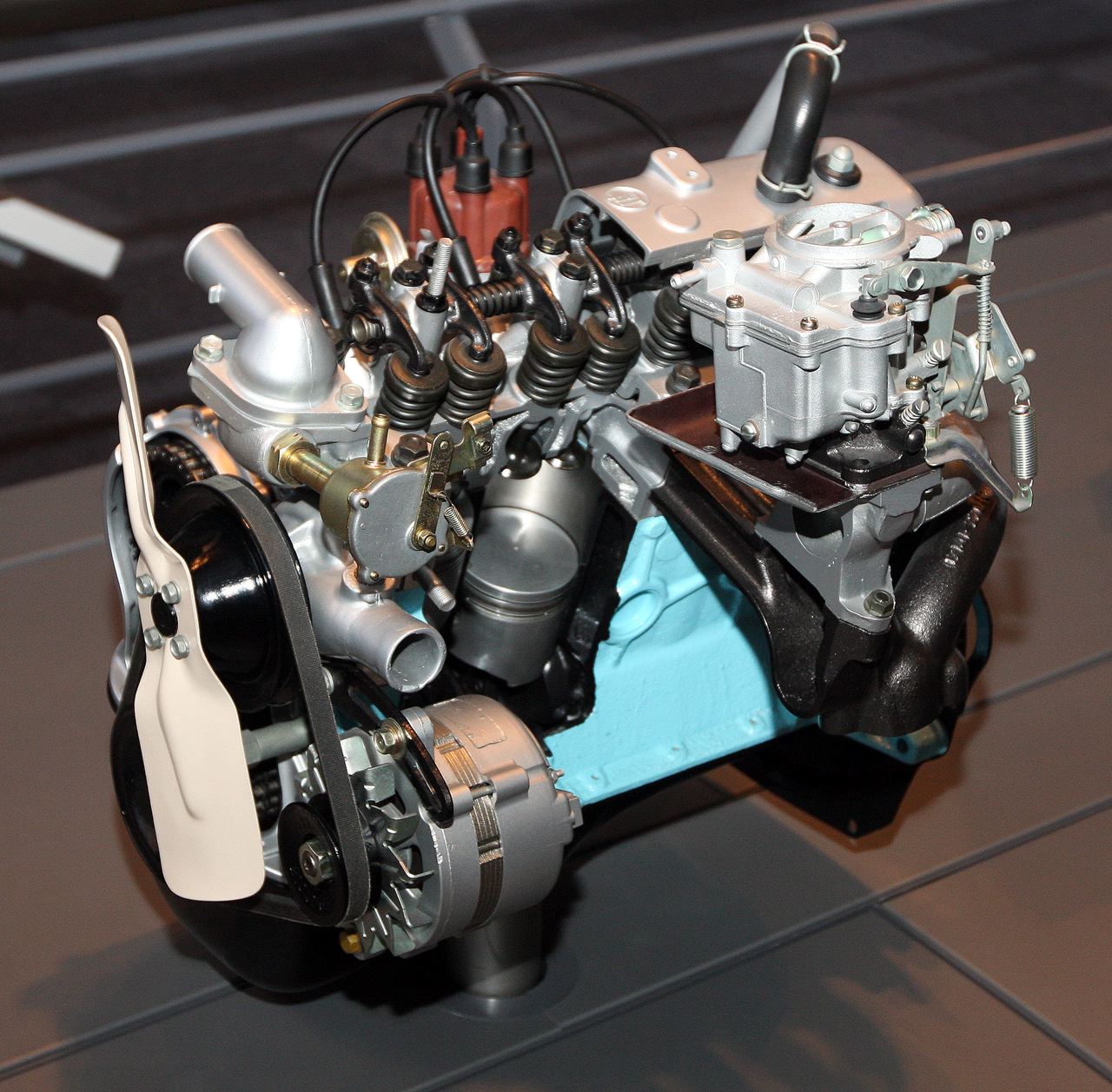
1966 Toyota K engine

The 8-valve OHV 1.1 L (1,077 cc) K was produced from 1966 through 1969. A similar K-B was produced from 1968 through 1969, the -B designates twin carburettors. Thus equipped, the engine produces 73 PS (54 kW; 72 hp) at 6600 rpm. The Publica SL received this more powerful version.

Applications:

- Toyota Corolla (KE1x)
- Toyota Publica (KP3x)

== 2K ==
The eight-valve OHV 1.0 L (993 cc) 2K was produced from 1969 through 1988. The cylinder bore and stroke was 72 mm × 61 mm (2.83 in × 2.40 in).

Output in 1978 was 35 kW; 48 PS (47 hp) at 5800 rpm, and 66 N⋅m; 48 lbf⋅ft (6.7 kg⋅m) at 3800 rpm. In 1983, New Zealand received a version with 40 kW (54 PS; 54 hp) at 5800 rpm, while Europe received a version with 33 kW (45 PS; 44 hp) at 5600 rpm, both with a maximum torque of 66 N⋅m; 48 lbf⋅ft (6.7 kg⋅m) at 4000 rpm.

Applications:

- Toyota Publica/1000 (KP30/KP36)
- Toyota Starlet

== 3K ==
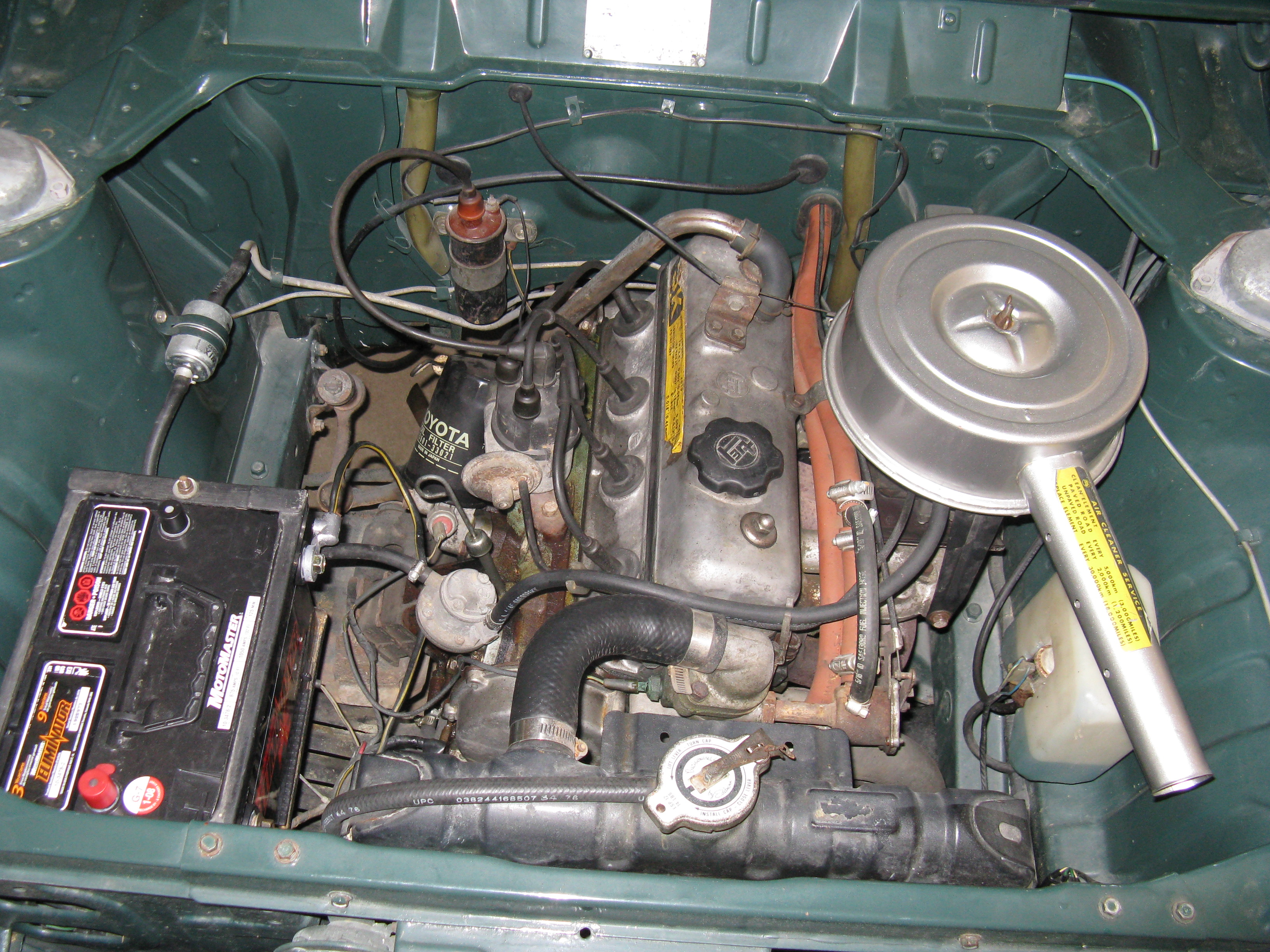
Toyota 3K engine.

The eight-valve overhead valve 1.2 L (1,166 cc) 3K was produced from 1969 through 1977. Cylinder bore and stroke was 75 mm × 66 mm (2.95 in × 2.60 in).

The 1969 through 1975 3K-B was a twin-carburetor version. The California-spec 3K-C (1977–1979) and 3K-H were other available versions.

Applications

- Toyota Corolla (E10)
- Toyota Corolla (E20)
- Toyota Corolla (E30)
- Toyota Kijang/first generation Toyota Tamaraw
- Toyota LiteAce (KM10)
- Toyota Publica (later pickups and vans received the desmogged 3K-HJ engine)
- Toyota Starlet
- Toyota TownAce (KR10)
- Daihatsu Charmant (A10)
- Daihatsu Delta 750 (KB10)

Specifications

(outputs are JIS unless otherwise noted)
Code	PS	kW	HP	at rpm	kgm	Nm	lb-ft	at rpm	Compr. Ratio	Comments
3K	68	50	67	6000	9.5	93	69	3800	9.0:1	
3K	58	43	57	6300	8.1	79	59	3900	9.0:1	(DIN)
3K	74	54	73	6000	10.3	101	75	3800	9.0:1	Export (SAE gross)
3K-B	77	57	76	6600	9.6	94	69	4600	10.0:1	Twin carburettors, high octane
3K-B	64	47	63	6200	9.0	88	65	4000	10.0:1	(DIN)
3K-B	84	62	83	6600	10.4	102	75	4600	10.0:1	Export (SAE gross)
3K-BR	74	54	73	6600	9.5	93	69	4600	9.0:1	As 3K-B but for regular octane
3K-C	59	43	58	5800	8.7	85	63	3800	9.0:1	California emissions controls (SAE net)
3K-D	73	54	72	6600	9.6	94	69	4200	10.0:1	High compression, single carburettor
3K-H	71	52	70	6000	9.7	95	70	4200	9.0:1	High octane
3K-H	55	40	54	6000	8.5	83	61	3800	9.0:1	(DIN)
3K-J	64	47	63	5800	9.2	90	67	3600	9.0:1	Japanese emission controls for commercial vehicles
3K-HJ	67	49	66	5800	9.4	92	68	3600	9.0:1	Japanese emission controls for commercial vehicles (Publica Van/Pickup, Starlet Van)
3K-U	64	47	63	5800	9.2	90	67	3600	9.0:1	Japanese emission controls (TTC-C) ("Toyota Total Clean-Catalyst")
3K-R	183	135	180	9000	19.6	192	142	8200	13.0:1	TRD Racing circuit engine

=== 3K-R ===
The 3K-R engine, also known as the 137E, was a special version of the standard 3K fitted to the Toyota Starlet (KP40) for use in touring car racing in Japan. In August 1972, the JAF made a rule change which allowed manufacturers to change the valvetrain design of an engine, with a minimum annual production of 50 engines. Toyota, Yamaha, and TOM'S immediately developed a 16-valve version of the 3K-R engine. The 3K-R has a 16-valve, dual overhead camshaft cylinder head with a compression ratio of 13:1 and was fuelled by a Nippon Denso built mechanical fuel injection system. The engine was also bored out to 1.3 L (1293 cc) and had a dry sump oil system. The engine produced around 180 PS (132 kW) at 9,000 rpm.

== 4K ==
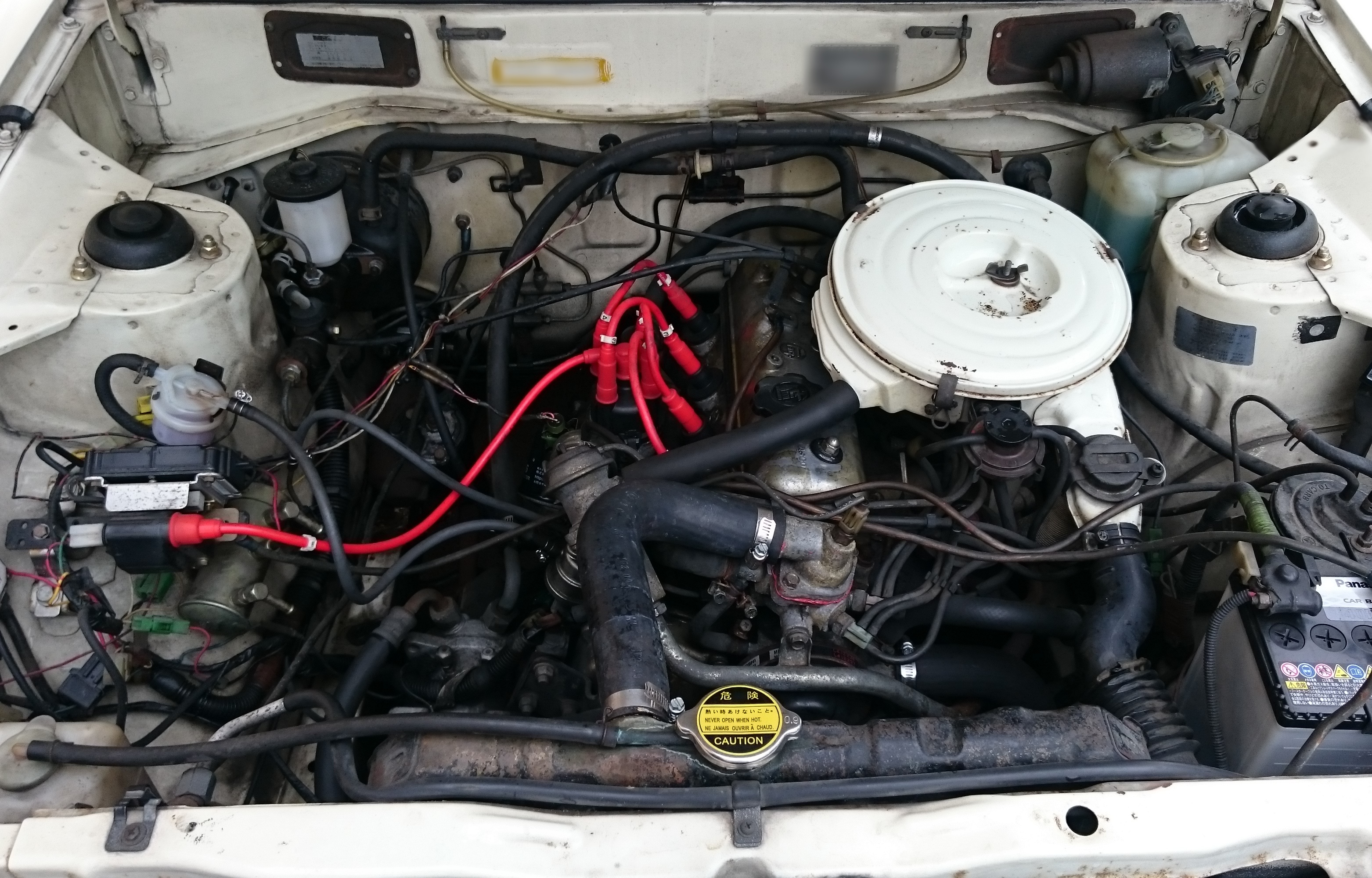
4K-U engine

The 1.3 L (1,290 cc) 4K was produced from 1977 through 1989. Cylinder bore and stroke was 75 mm × 73 mm (2.95 in × 2.87 in). It was an 8-valve OHV engine.

In 1980, the 4K produced 43 kW; 59 PS (58 hp) at 5250 rpm. From 1983 through 1984, output was 46 kW; 63 PS (62 hp) at 5600 rpm and 97 N⋅m; 72 lbf⋅ft (9.9 kg⋅m) at 3600 rpm.

The 1981 and 1982 California-spec 4K-C produced 43 kW; 59 PS (58 hp) at 5200 rpm and 90 N⋅m; 67 lbf⋅ft (9.2 kg⋅m) at 3600 rpm. Torque was up to 100 N⋅m; 74 lbf⋅ft (10.2 kg⋅m) at 3400 rpm for the fuel injected 1982 through 1984 4K-E. The Japan-spec 4K-U produced 55 kW; 75 PS (74 hp) at 5600 rpm and 105 N⋅m; 77 lbf⋅ft (10.7 kg⋅m) at 3600 rpm in 1982. Available in hydraulic and solid lifter configurations

Applications:

- Toyota Corolla (E70)
- Toyota Kijang
- Toyota Liteace
- Toyota Starlet
- Daihatsu Charmant
- 1977–1979 Daihatsu Delta 750 (KD11)

== 5K ==
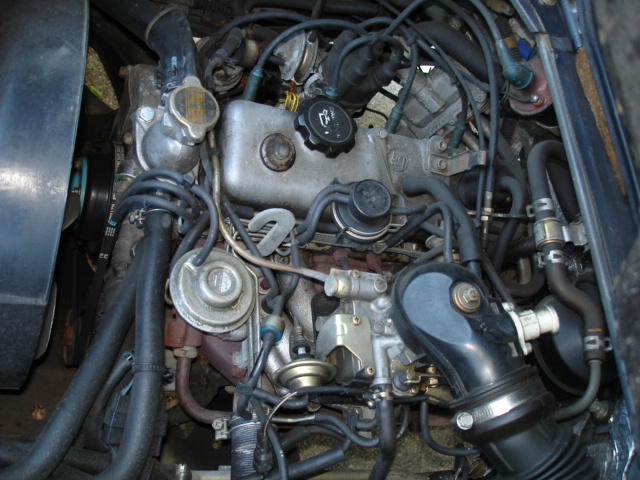
Toyota 5K-C engine in a 1991 Liteace

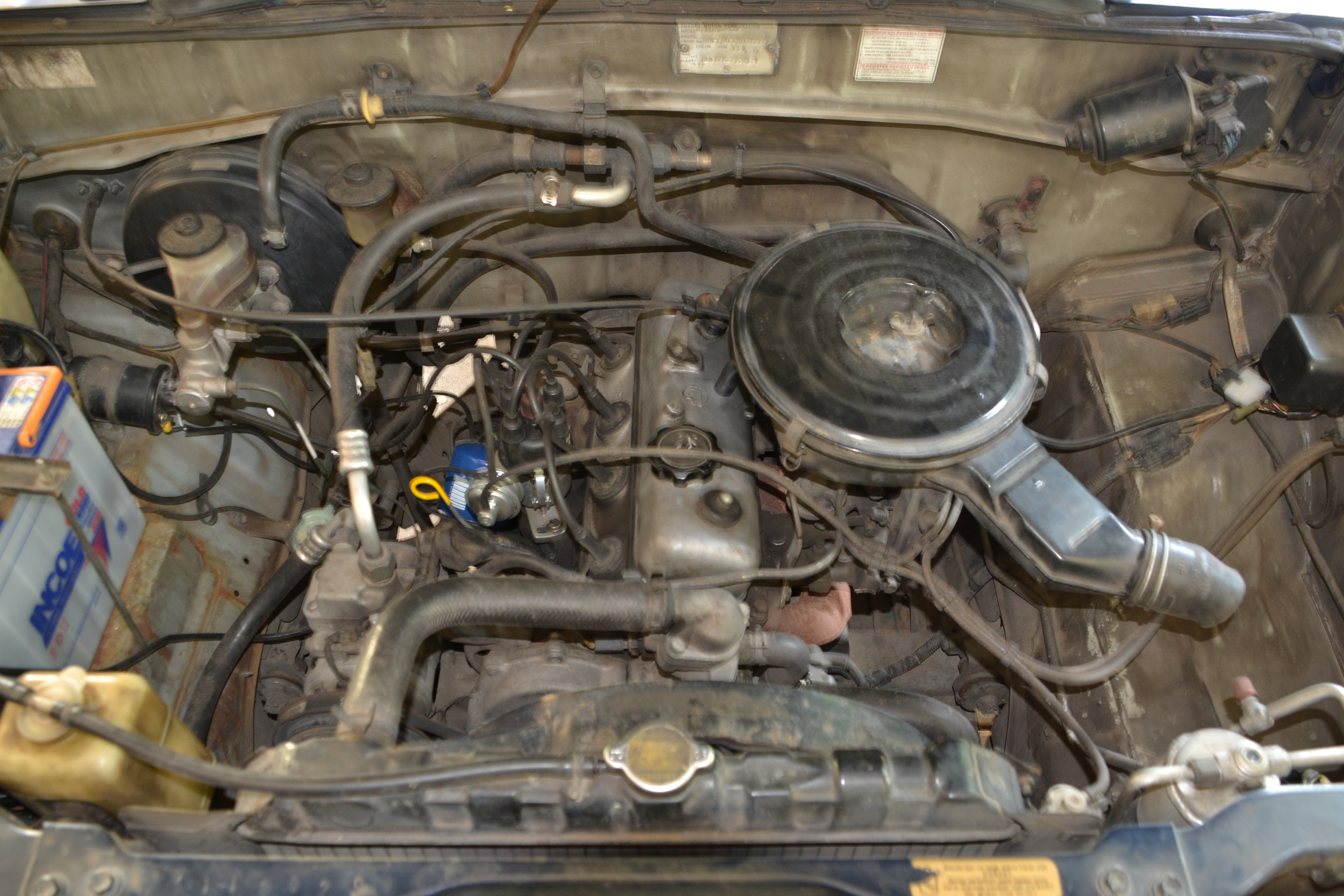
5K engine in a 1993 Toyota Kijang

The 1.5 L (1,486 cc) 5K was produced from 1983 through 1996. Typical output is 55 kW (74 hp; 75 PS) at 5600 rpm. Bore and stroke is 80.5 mm × 73 mm (3.17 in × 2.87 in). It was available with either 4- or 5-speed manual transmissions. Like the smaller 4K model, it uses hydraulic lifters as well as solid lifters for the pushrod.

Applications:

- 1983.08-1987.10 Toyota Carina Van (KA67V 'Van') 5K-J
- 1983.05-1987.08 Toyota Corolla Van (KE74V) 5K-J
- 1983.10-1987.12 Toyota Corona Van (KT147V 'Van') 5K-J, 61 kW (82 hp; 83 PS) at 5,200 rpm
- Toyota Liteace KR27 Van
- Toyota Liteace KM36 Van 49 kW (66 hp; 67 PS) at 4800 rpm, 115 N⋅m; 85 lbf⋅ft (11.7 kg⋅m) at 3200 rpm
- Toyota Kijang/Tamaraw
- Toyota TownAce KR41 Van
- Toyota Forklift (late 1980s-early 1990s model)

== 7K ==
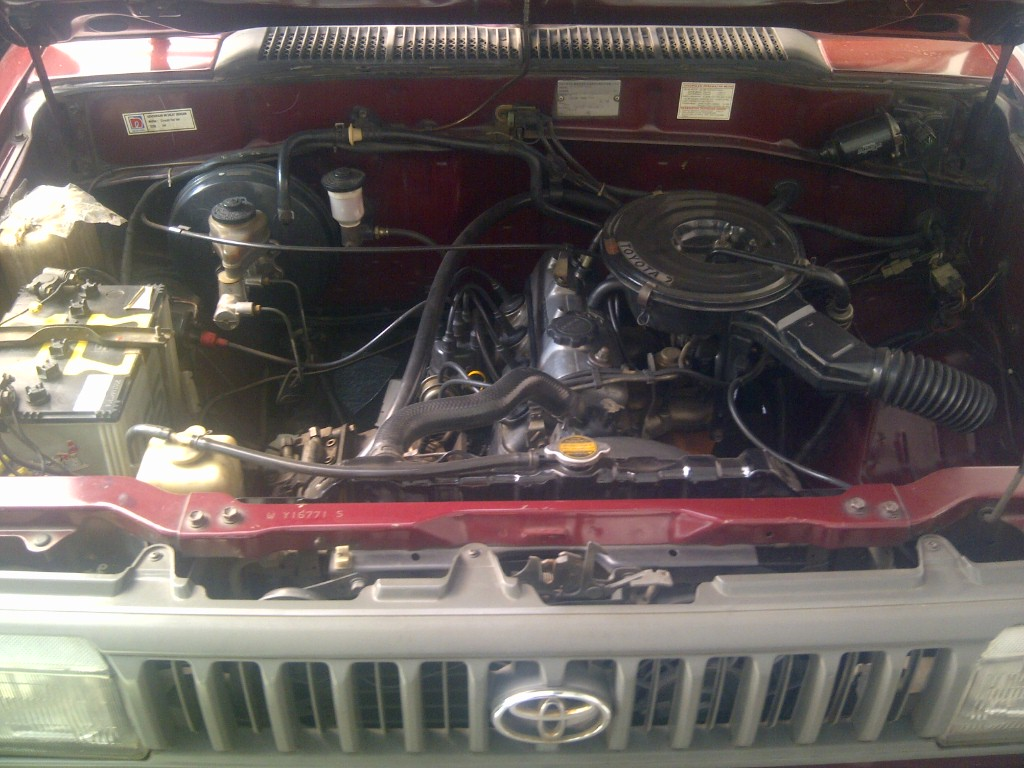
7K-C engine in a 1996 Toyota Kijang

The 1.8 L (1,781 cc) 7K was first introduced in 1983. Cylinder bore and stroke was 80.5 mm × 87.5 mm (3.17 in × 3.44 in). Output was 60 kW; 81 PS (80 hp) at 4600 rpm and 139 N⋅m; 103 lbf⋅ft (14.2 kg⋅m) at 2800 rpm while the EFI version which can be found in Toyota Kijang KF80 produces 62 kW; 84 PS (83 hp) at 4600 rpm and 147 N⋅m; 108 lbf⋅ft (15 kg⋅m) at 3200 rpm. The Engine was available with a 5 speed manual & 4 speed automatic transmission. Available in both fuel injected and carburetted configurations, the 7K produces much more power and torque compared to the other K engines however it is a lot less 'rev happy' due to having such a long stroke.

7K-E is available in KR42 Townace SBV vans (1997–2007) using a large G52 5 speed gearbox (same bellhousing to box pattern as W55), or automatic.

Applications:

- Toyota Kijang/Tamaraw FX/Revo
- Toyota LiteAce/TownAce

== See also ==
- List of Toyota engines
- Toyota K transmission
