= Toyota K transmission =

Toyota Motor Corporation's K family is a series of 4 and 5-speed light/medium-duty transmissions found in Toyota Corollas and Starlets.

== K40 ==
Oil capacity: 3.0 imp pints(1.7L)

Synchromesh on all Forward gears

Ratios:

- First Gear: 3.769:1
- Second Gear: 2.250:1
- Third Gear: 1.405:1
- Fourth Gear: 1.010:1
- Reverse Gear: 4.316:1

Applications:

- Most 4-speed RWD Starlets and Corollas with K-series engines
- KM20 series LiteAces that were fitted with K-series engines had a standard K40 fitted with a column shifter
- Toyota Racing Development** has produced a fourth gear closer to third in Ratio

== K50/K51 ==
Oil capacity:4.2 Imp pints(2.45L)

Synchromesh on all Forward Gears

Ratios (K50):

- First Gear: 3.789:1
- Second Gear: 2.220:1
- Third Gear: 1.435:1
- Fourth Gear: 1.000:1
- Fifth Gear: 0.865:1
- Reverse gear: 4.316:1

or (K51)

- First Gear: 3.789:1
- Second Gear: 2.124:1
- Third Gear: 1.323:1
- Fourth Gear: 1.000:1
- Fifth Gear: 0.865:1
- Reverse gear: 4.316:1

or

TRD GEAR SETS TRD also sold a close ratio gear sets in the 70's and 80's (P/N 33030-KP601) for the K-50 with the following ratio:

- 1st: 2.695
- 2nd: 1.619
- 3rd: 1.235
- 4th: 1.000
- 5th: 0.892

Applications:

- Most 5-speed RWD Starlets and Corollas with K-series engines.
- 1986 Corolla with 3A-U and 4A-U engines.
- KM20 series LiteAces were fitted with K50 transmissions to 4K and 5K engines as an option, and to the 7K as standard.

== See also ==
- Toyota Transmissions
- Toyota K engine
