= Toyota Corolla (E10) =

First generation of Toyota Corolla

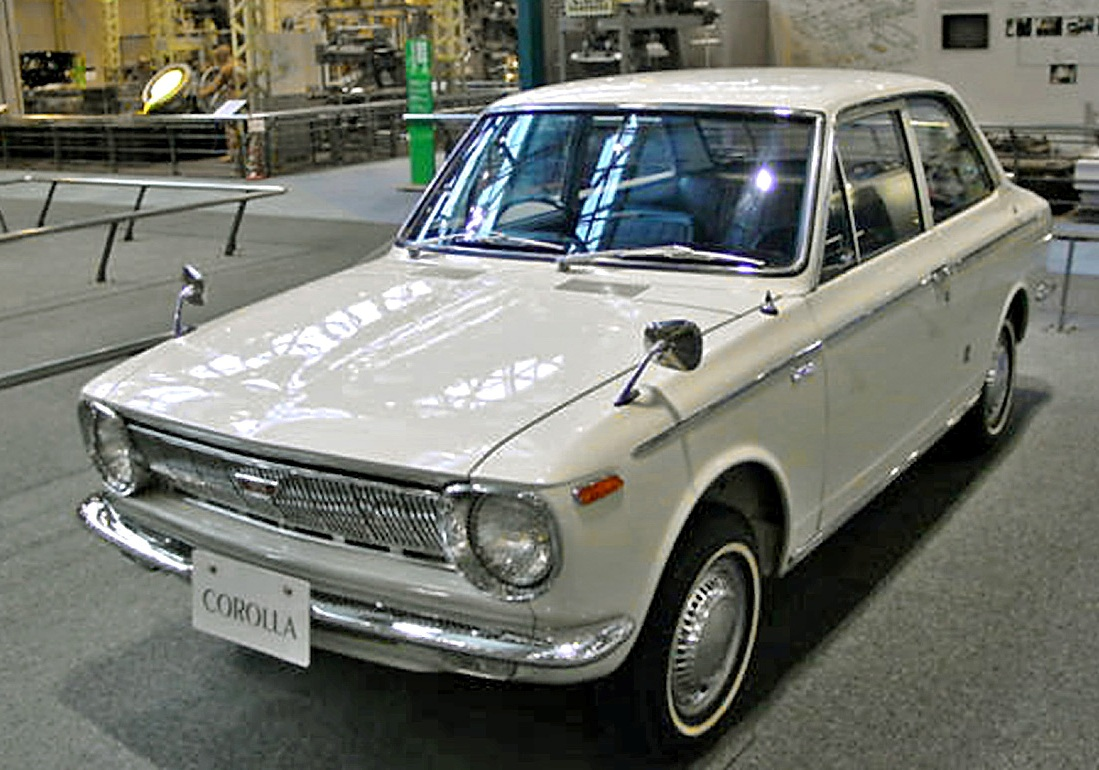
- Toyota Corolla (E10) 2-door Sedan

Overview
- Model code: E10
- Production: November 1966 – April 1970; July 1968–1970 (Australia)
- Assembly: Japan: Takaoka Plant, Toyota City; Australia: Port Melbourne, Victoria (Australian Motor Industries); Canada: Sydney, Nova Scotia (CMI); Malaysia: Shah Alam (UMW Toyota Motor); New Zealand: Thames (Toyota New Zealand); Philippines: Parañaque (Delta Motors Corporation); Thailand: Samut Prakan (Toyota Motor Thailand)
- Designer: Tatsuo Hasegawa (1962)

Body and chassis
- Body style: 2/4-door sedan; 2-door coupe; 3-door van/wagon
- Layout: FR layout

Powertrain
- Engine: 1.1 L K I4; 1.2 L 3K I4
- Transmission: 4-speed manual; 2-speed A20 automatic

Dimensions
- Wheelbase: 2,285 mm (90.0 in)
- Length: 3,845 mm (151.4 in)
- Width: 1,485 mm (58.5 in)
- Height: 1,380 mm (54.3 in)

Chronology
- Predecessor: Publica
- Successor: Corolla E20

The Corolla E10 was the first generation of cars marketed by Toyota under the Corolla name.

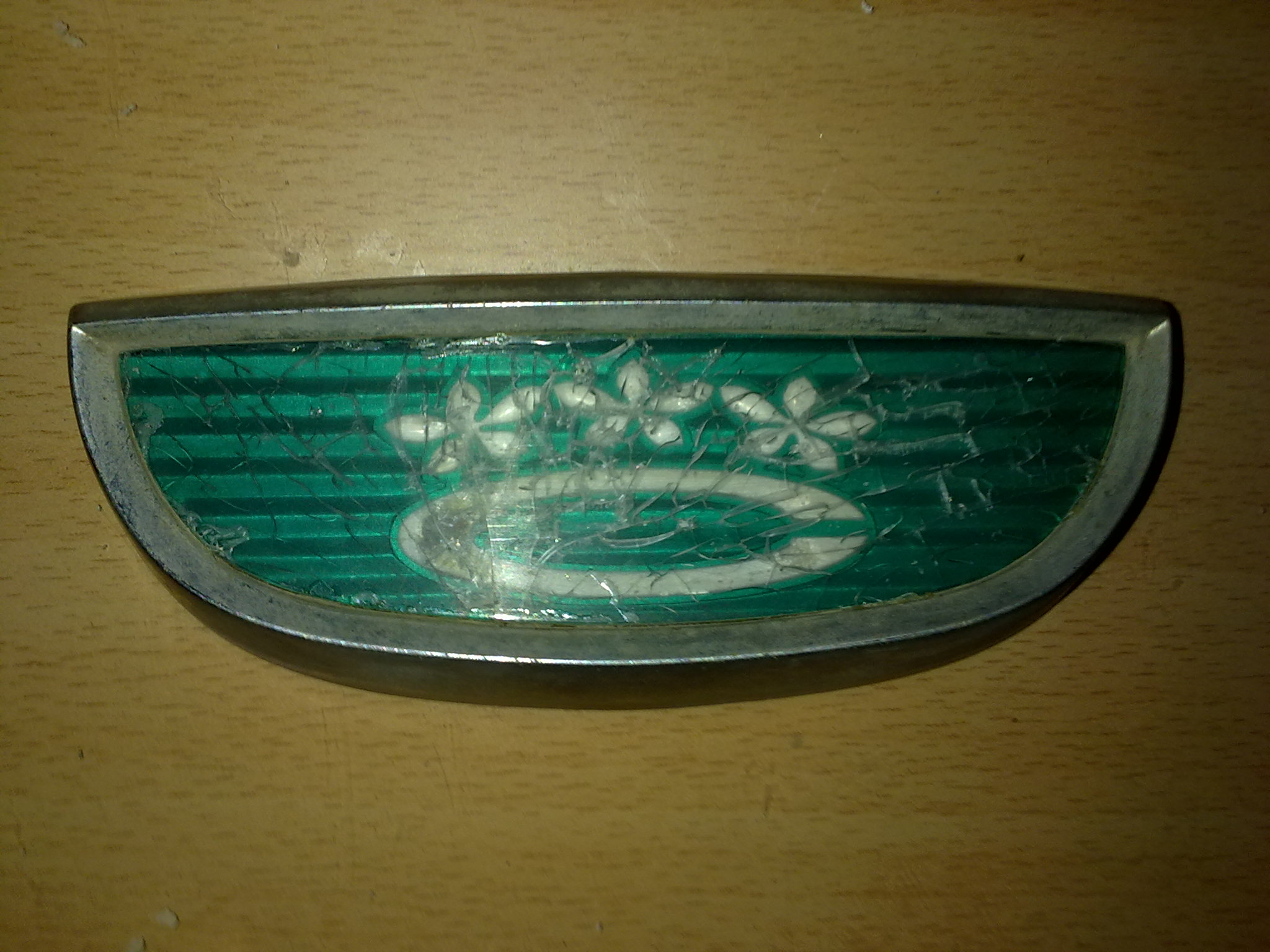
Toyota Corolla E10 wagon emblem

The Corolla was launched in Japan in November 1966 at a Japanese dealership sales channel called Toyota Corolla Store. Eiji Toyoda said it took hard work to create popular demand, and disputed that Toyota rode a wave of private car ownership that was taking off in the mid-1960s. The Corolla's major competitor was the Datsun 1000, released a few months earlier, along with the Subaru 1000 earlier in May. Its companion, the Toyota Sprinter, was sold at a different dealership sales channel called Toyota Auto Store. The Corolla's development was largely influenced by the success and lessons learned from an earlier, smaller vehicle called the Toyota Publica, which used an air-cooled two-cylinder, boxer engine, inspired by the Citroën 2CV. The dealership that was named after the Corolla in Japan was previously known as the Toyota Public Store, to sell the Publica.

== Design ==
The initial car, the KE1x series used a 2,285 mm (90.0 in) wheelbase. The transmission was by a four-speed floor shift manual transmission or a two-speed floor or column shift automatic transmission, with rear wheel drive. In Japan at the time, floor-shift transmissions were considered only suitable for trucks while four speeds implied that the engine did not have enough torque to drive through only three gears (more torque allows each gear to have a wider spread of engine revolutions, thus requiring fewer gears). This was a big risk for Toyota but the effectiveness of the new system gained in popularity.

The suspension in front was MacPherson struts supported by a transverse leaf spring beneath the engine cross-member, with leaf springs connected to a solid axle in back.

The engine was originally meant to be for the under 1000 cc tax class but was changed late in the design process to be 1077 cc in order to beat the forthcoming Datsun 1000. In Japan, this put it into a 1000cc engine road tax class but gave it some prestige over the Datsun 1000 - helped by its "100 cc advantage" advertising campaign. In May 1967, a four-door sedan (KE10F) and a three-door light van (KE16V, essentially a station wagon but classified as a light commercial vehicle in Japan) joined the lineup, as did the "Toyoglide" two-speed automatic.

In March 1968, the range got a facelift, mostly safety upgrades to reflect new American legislation. Since the beginning of the Corolla, Toyota has dependably facelifted each generation after two years and replaced it with an all-new model every four years. The dashboard was now padded and used non-reflective glass, while the front bumper was mounted somewhat higher. Also new were a four-speed column-shift option and a new model: the better equipped Corolla SL two-door sedan used a twin carburetted K-B engine and had an extra 13 PS (10 kW). The K-B engine was not available with a column shift. In early April the "Corolla Sprinter" coupé, using the SL's more powerful engine, was introduced. In August 1968 Thai Hino Industry began assembling the Corolla locally; this was the first Corolla to be produced outside of Japan. In October 1968 a four-door version of the well-equipped SL version was added to the lineup.

In August 1969 the engine was upgraded to 1166 cc. A special, twin carburettor 3K-B (1166 cc) engine was again used in the SL and Sprinter models.

== Japan ==
Japanese market engines:

- K – 1.1 L (1077 cc) I4, 8-valve OHV, carb, 60 PS (44 kW)
- K-B – 1.1 L (1077 cc) I4, 8-valve OHV, twin carb, 73 PS (54 kW)
- 3K – 1.2 L (1166 cc) I4, 8-valve OHV, carb, 65 PS (48 kW)
- 3K-B – 1.2 L (1166 cc) I4, 8-valve OHV, twin carb, 78 PS (57 kW)

Japanese market chassis:

- E10 – 1077 cc Sedan (2-door/4-door)
- E15 – 1077 cc Coupé
- E16V – 1077 cc Van, 3-door
- E11 – 1166 cc Sedan (2-door/4-door)
- E17 – 1166 cc Coupé
- E18V – 1166 cc Van, 3-door

== North America ==
Exports to the United States began in March 1968 at about US$1,700 (equivalent to $15,739 in 2025). The Corolla was also assembled in Sydney, Nova Scotia by Canadian Motor Industries (CMI) beginning in late 1969. CMI only ever assembled small numbers of Toyotas, as the finished cars cost ten percent more than a fully built up import and their quality was much lower. CMI also assembled the succeeding generation Corolla but ended operations in 1975, after about 8,000 cars had been built there.

North American market engines:

- K – 1.1 L (1077 cc) I4, 8-valve OHV, carb, 60 hp (45 kW)
- 3K – 1.2 L (1166 cc) I4, 8-valve OHV, carb, 65 hp (48 kW)

North American market chassis:

- E10 – 1077 cc Sedan (2-door/4-door)
- E15 – 1077 cc Coupé
- E16 – 1077 cc Wagon, 2-door
- E11 – 1166 cc Sedan (2-door/4-door)
- E17 – 1166 cc Coupé
- E18 – 1166 cc Wagon, 2-door

== Australia ==
The first export market for the Corolla was Australia from November 1966. Australia received right hand drive versions of the same models as America. Local production commenced in July 1968.

== Gallery ==
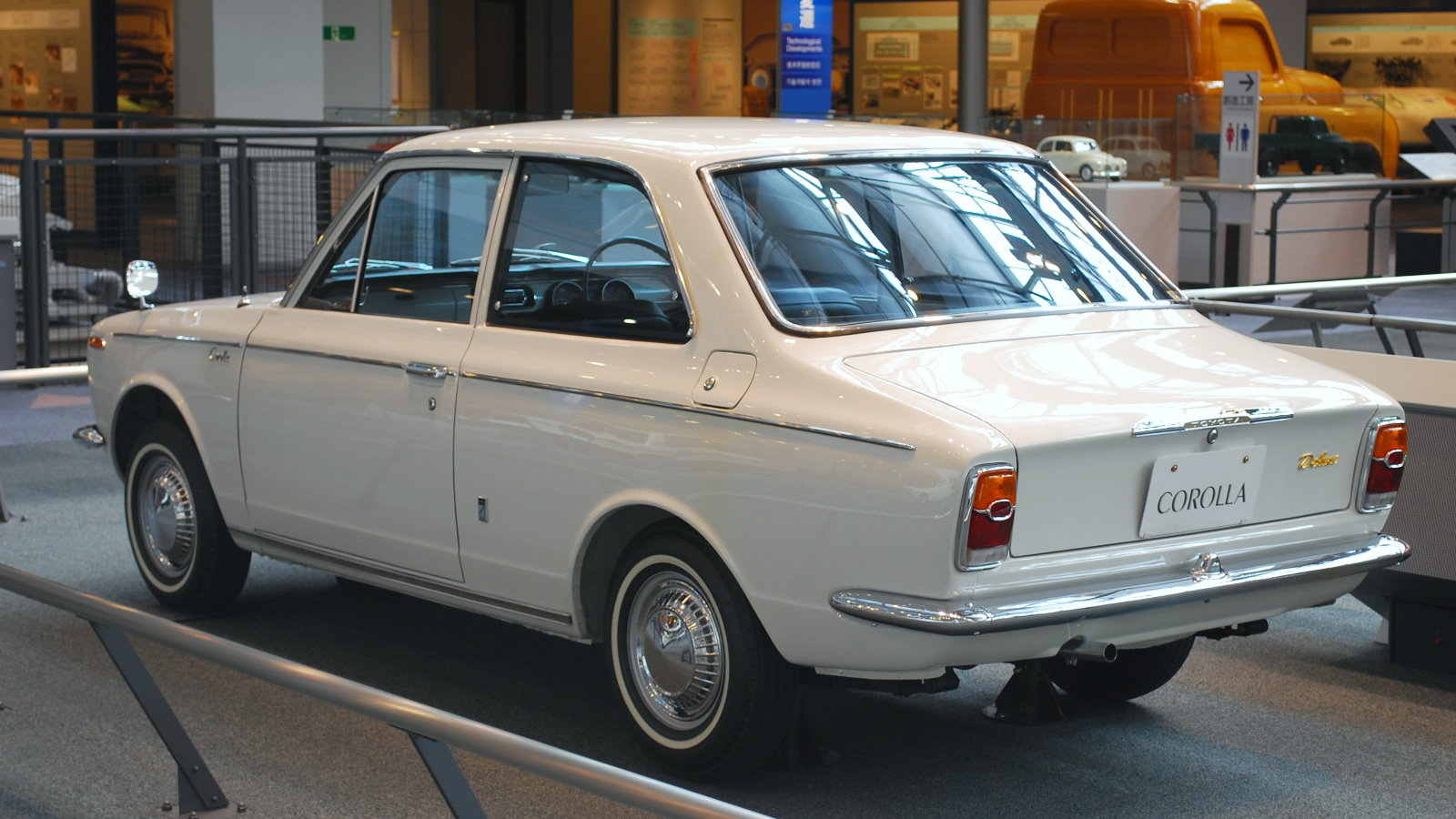
Corolla (E10) 2-door Sedan

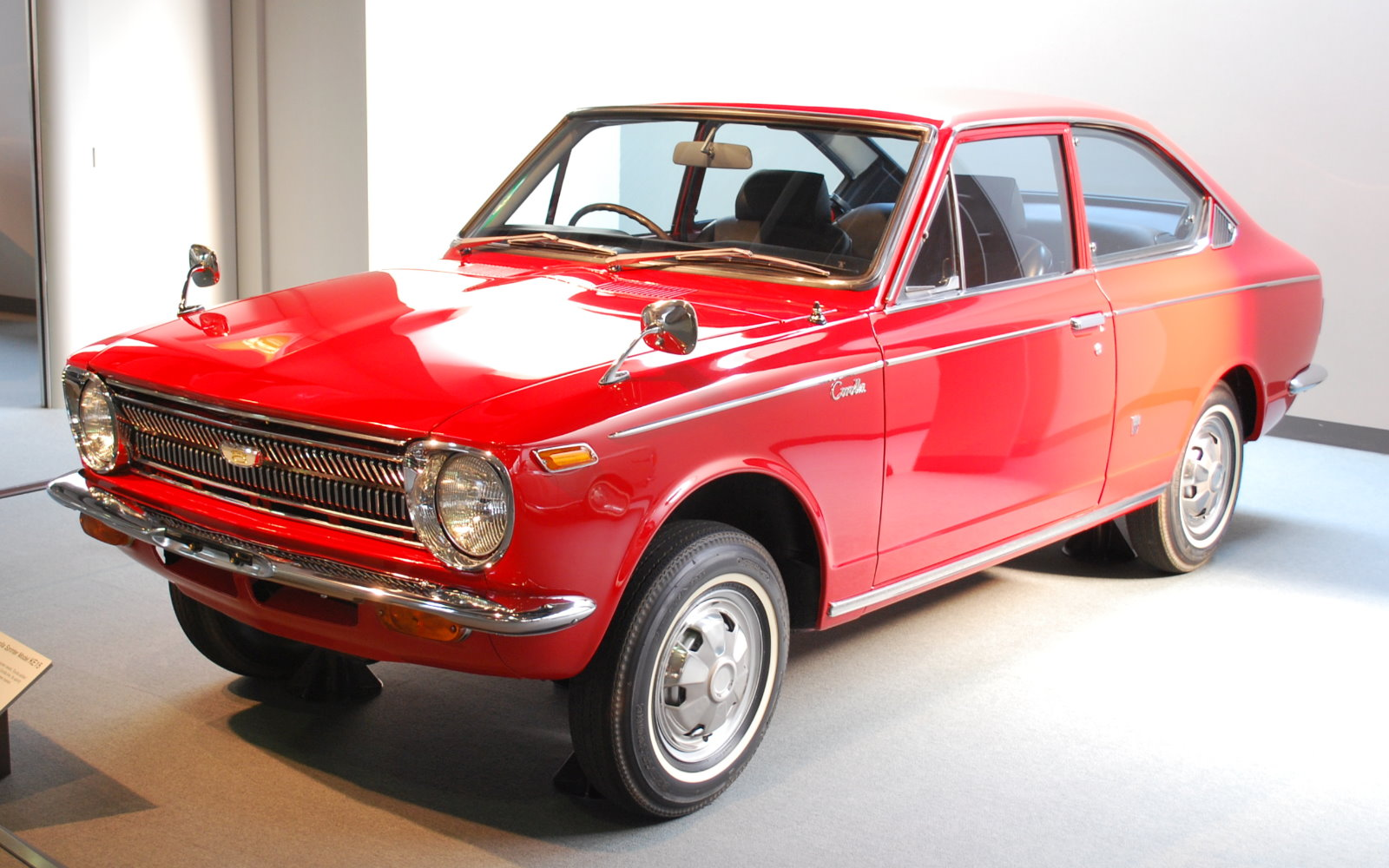
Corolla Sprinter (E10)

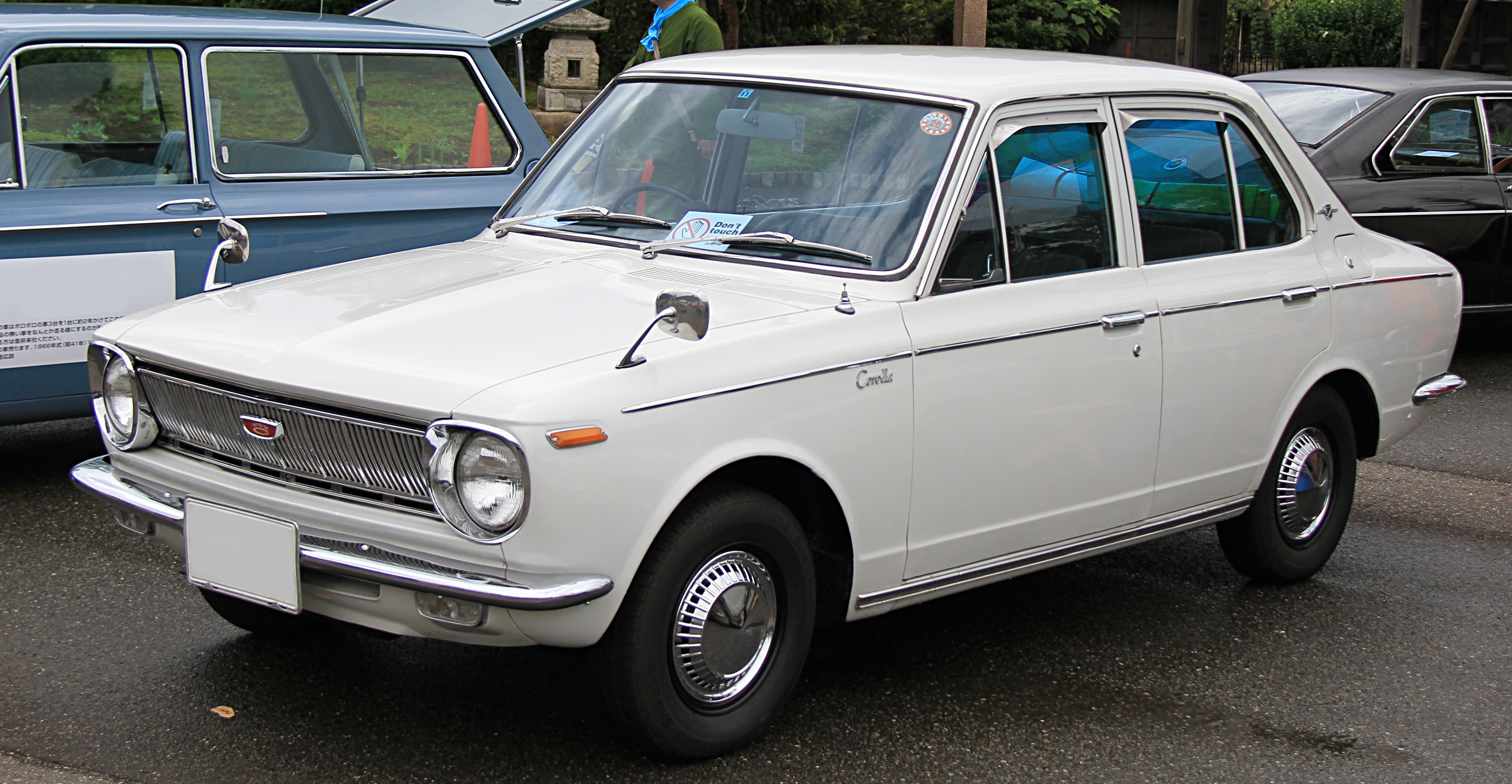
Corolla (E10) 4-door Sedan

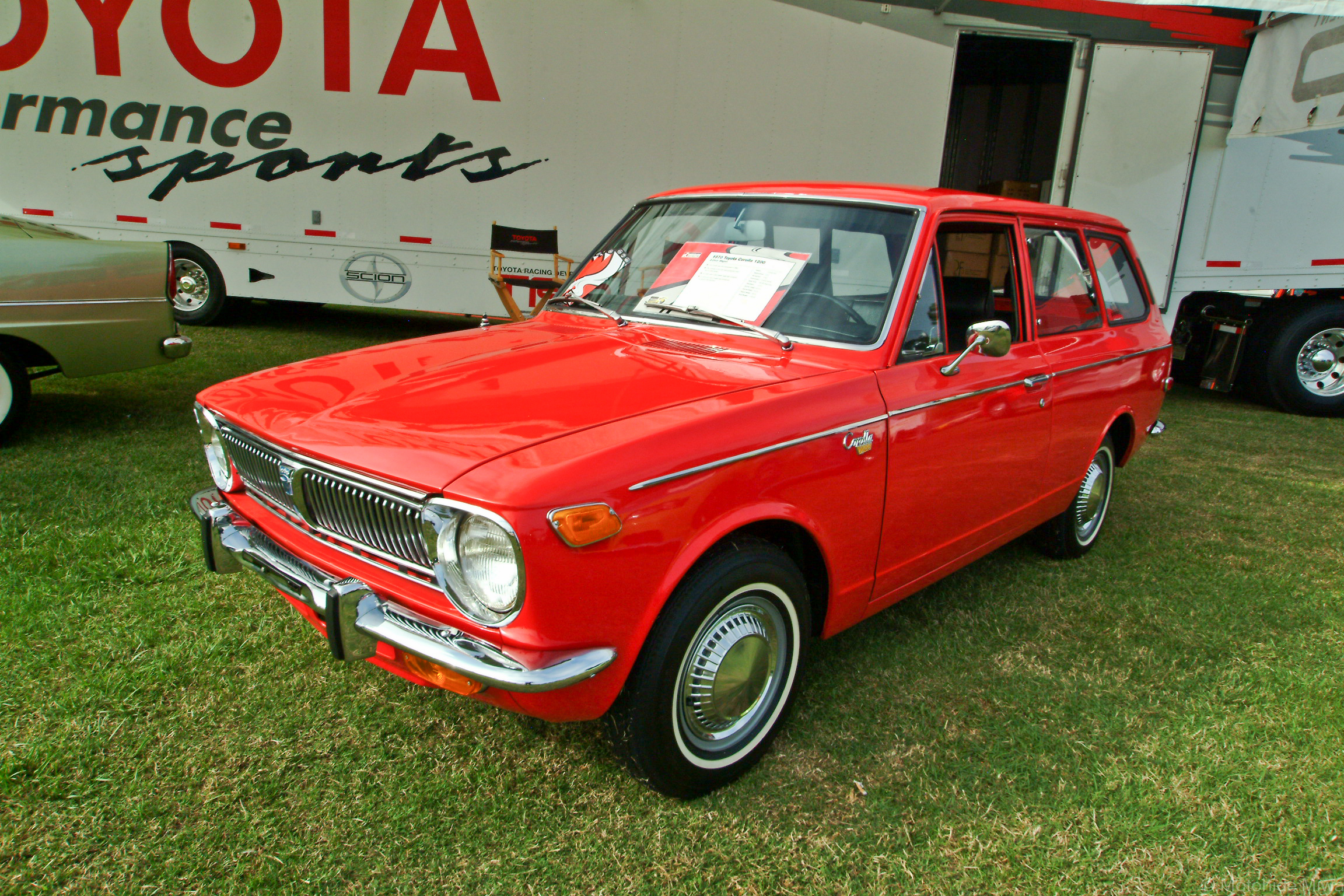
Corolla (E10) Wagon (facelifted model)

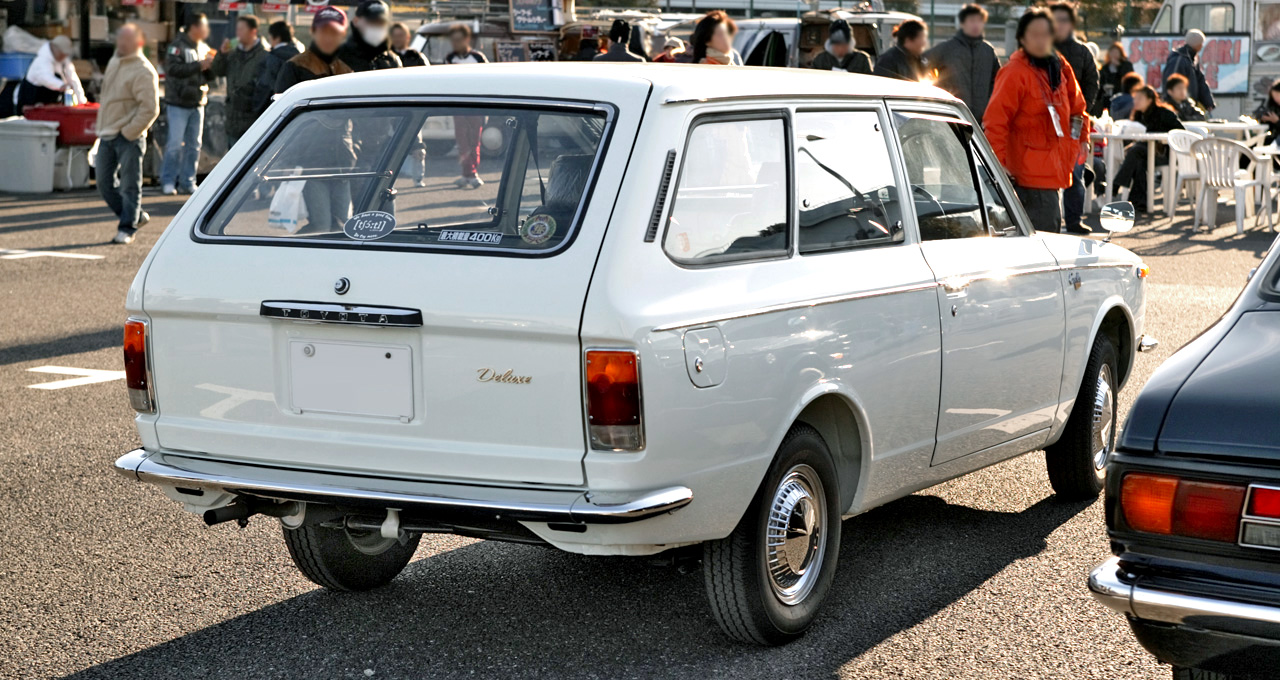
Corolla Van Deluxe (KE18, JDM)

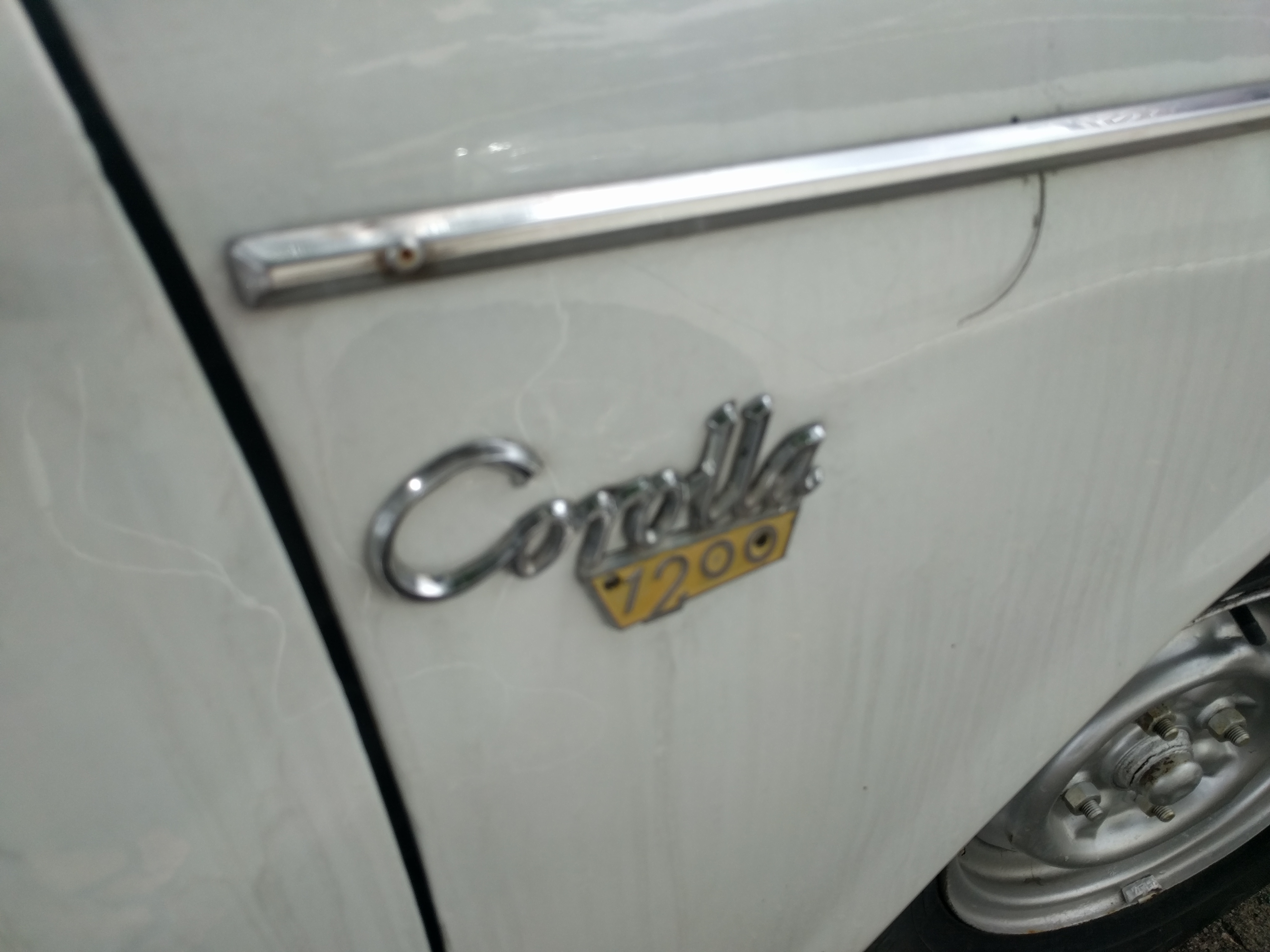
Front right fender badge
