= Tachikawa Ki-94 =

Japanese fighter/interceptor prototype

Ki-94
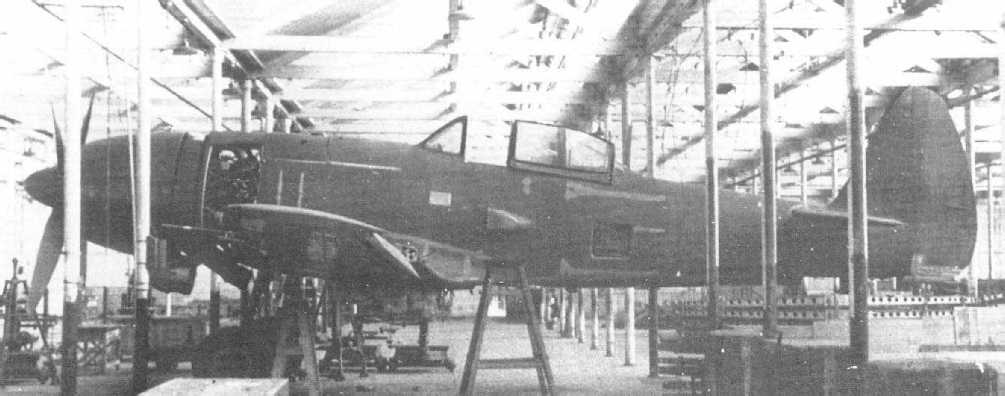
- The first prototype of the Ki-94-II under construction

General information
- Type: Interceptor
- National origin: Japan
- Manufacturer: Tachikawa Aircraft Company Ltd
- Designer: Tatsuo Hasegawa
- Status: Prototype
- Primary user: Imperial Japanese Army Air Service

History
- Manufactured: 2
- Retired: 1945

The Tachikawa Ki-94 was a single-seat fighter-interceptor aircraft project undertaken by the Tachikawa Aircraft Company and to be operated by the Imperial Japanese Army. The project refers to two aircraft designs: the Ki-94-I and the Ki-94-II, both of which did not advance beyond the mock-up and prototype stage respectively.

== Design and development ==
=== Ki-94-I ===
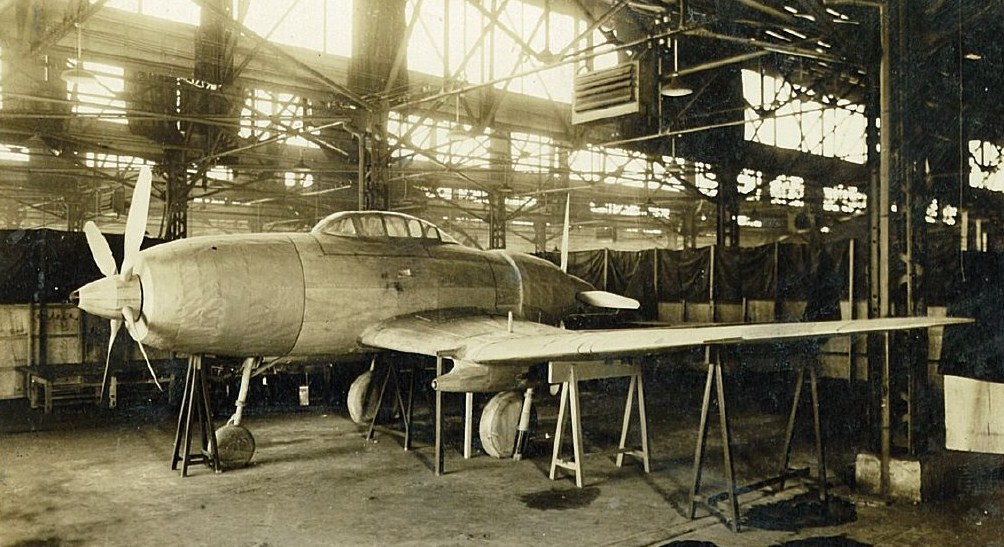
A full-scale wooden mock-up of the Ki-94-I.

The first was a twin-boom monoplane with two 1,641 kW (2,201 hp) Mitsubishi Ha211 18-cylinder engines, driving two 4-blade propellers in a push-pull configuration. The very heavy armament planned for the aircraft (two 37 mm (1.46 in) and two 30 mm (1.18 in) cannon should have been enough to make short work of most US heavy bombers of the era. Notwithstanding the outstanding prospective performance, which however, was judged as "unduly optimistic" by the technical department of the Japanese Army Air Force, this design was judged too complex by the technical department, and the design was discarded.

=== Ki-94-II ===
The second Ki-94 design, made by a team also under Tatsuo Hasegawa as type I, chief designer of the aircraft and responsible for the used airfoil, was a more conventional single-seat, piston-engine monoplane fighter developed for the Imperial Japanese Army Air Force along the same requirements as the Nakajima Ki-87, which had been the Army's fall-back design for the original Ki-94. Intended to counter B-29 raids, it was optimized for high-altitude interception with a pressurized cockpit and heavy armament.

This design was approved by the Koku Hombu, and the aircraft was designated Ki-94-II (the scrapped earlier Ki-94 design was named the Ki-94-I). An order was placed for one static test airframe, three prototypes, and eighteen pre-production aircraft. Only two prototypes were built in the event; the first was equipped with a single 1,895 kW (2,541 hp) Nakajima Ha219 [Ha-44] engine, driving a 4-blade propeller because the 6-blade one was not ready. The second prototype was to be fitted with a 6-blade propeller. The War's end however stopped the construction of the second prototype and also found the first prototype still being readied for its maiden flight. So, the Ki-94-II never took to the air.

== Specifications (Ki-94-II (estimated performance)) ==
Data from Famous Aircraft of the World, first series, no.76: Japanese Army Experimental Fighters (1), Japanese Aircraft of the Pacific War

General characteristics

- Crew: 1
- Length: 12 m (39 ft 4 in)
- Wingspan: 14 m (45 ft 11 in)
- Height: 4.65 m (15 ft 3 in)
- Wing area: 28 m^{2} (300 sq ft)
- Airfoil: root: (Tatsuo Hasegawa) TH346-8454 (17%); tip: (Tatsuo Hasegawa) TH346-7s505 (10%)
- Empty weight: 4,690 kg (10,340 lb)
- Gross weight: 6,450 kg (14,220 lb)
- Powerplant: 1 × Nakajima Ha219 (unified [Ha-44-12]) 18-cylinder air-cooled radial piston engine, 1,830 kW (2,450 hp) for take-off

1,750 kW (2,350 hp) at 1,100 m (3,600 ft)
1,600 kW (2,200 hp) at 4,400 m (14,400 ft)
1,520 kW (2,040 hp) at 11,000 m (36,000 ft)

- Propellers: 4-bladed constant-speed propeller

Performance

- Maximum speed: 712 km/h (442 mph, 384 kn)
- Cruise speed: 440 km/h (270 mph, 240 kn)
- Range: 2,100 km (1,300 mi, 1,100 nmi)
- Service ceiling: 14,680 m (48,160 ft)
- Time to altitude: 5,000 m (16,000 ft) in 5 minutes 9 seconds

10,000 m (33,000 ft) in 17 minutes 38 seconds
13,000 m (43,000 ft) in 21 minutes 3 seconds

- Wing loading: 230.4 kg/m^{2} (47.2 lb/sq ft)
- Power/mass: 0.283 kW/kg (0.172 hp/lb)

Armament

- Guns: 2 × 30 mm (1.181 in) Ho-155 cannon and 2 × 20 mm (0.787 in) Ho-5 cannon both in the wings,
- Bombs: 2 × 250 kg (550 lb) bombs or 1 × 500 kg (1,100 lb) bomb

== See also ==
Aircraft of comparable role, configuration, and era

- Focke-Wulf Ta 152H
- Republic P-47N Thunderbolt
- Nakajima Ki-87
- Mansyu Ki-98
- Dornier Do 335

Related lists

- List of military aircraft of Japan
- List of twin-boom aircraft
