= Toyota Publica =

Subcompact car produced by Toyota (1961-1978)

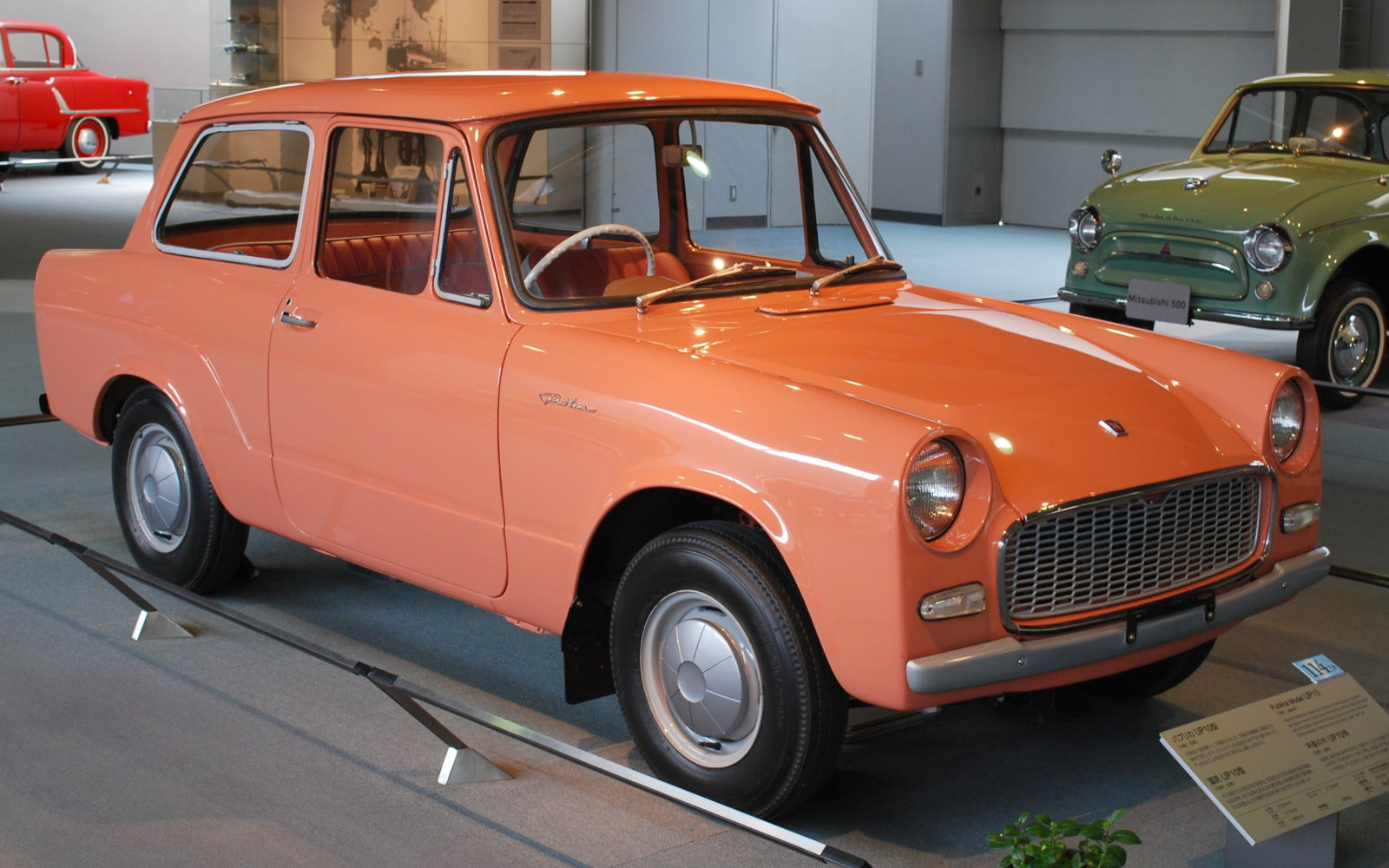
- Toyota Publica (UP10) at the Toyota Automobile Museum

Overview
- Manufacturer: Toyota
- Also called: Shinjin Publica (신진 퍼블리카)
- Production: 1961–1978

Body and chassis
- Class: Subcompact car
- Body style: 2-door sedan 3-door station wagon 2-door coupé 2-door convertible 2-door coupe utility (pickup)
- Layout: FR layout
- Related: Daihatsu Consorte; Toyota Sports 800

Chronology
- Successor: Toyota Starlet (Hatchback); Toyota Tercel (Sedan)

The Toyota Publica (Japanese: トヨタ・パブリカ, Toyota Paburika) is a small car manufactured by the Japanese company Toyota from 1961 until 1978. Conceived as a family car to fulfill the requirements of the Japanese Government's "national car concept", it was the smallest Toyota car during that period and was superseded in that role by the Toyota Starlet, which itself started out as a version of the Publica. It was available as a 2-door vehicle only, but in a selection of body styles, ranging from the base sedan through a station wagon, convertible, coupé and even a coupe utility (pickup), which outlived the other models by a decade, and spawned other models, such as the Toyota Sports 800 and the Toyota MiniAce.

== Development ==
=== MITI "national car" concept ===
The origins of the Publica can be traced to the "national car" concept of the powerful Japanese Ministry of International Trade and Industry (MITI), which was announced in 1955. The concept stipulated for a vehicle fulfilling several requirements, like maximum speed over 100 km/h (62 mph), weight below 400 kg (882 lb), fuel consumption not exceeding 30 km/L (3.3 L/100 km; 85 mpg_{‑imp}; 71 mpg_{‑US}) at the average speed of 60 km/h (37 mph) on a level road, but also notably the requirement that the car would not break down or require significant repairs for at least 100,000 kilometres (62,000 mi).

=== From concept to reality ===
Although Eiji Toyoda was initially keen to take advantage of the, at that time innovative, FF concept (front-mounted engine with front-wheel drive), it proved technically too complicated for Toyota engineers to be able to complete within the allotted time, so the decision was made to switch to more conventional FR layout. The Publica was inspired by the successful Citroën 2CV which also used a 2-cylinder, air-cooled, horizontally opposed engine, with front-wheel drive. In spite of the fact that the government sources announced that significant tax breaks would be made for cars with engine displacements of less than 500 cc, Toyota decided that such a small engine would provide insufficient power on the highways, and increased the planned displacement to 700 cc. The resulting engine was an air-cooled 697 cc ohv 2-cylinder boxer which produced 28 PS (21 kW), and was known internally as the Toyota U engine. The tax incentives did not materialize; the displacement did qualify in the lowest annual road tax bracket, thus helping sales. In 1966 Toyota began to acquire kei car manufacturer Daihatsu.

The new car was given a two-door sedan body, which was intended to accommodate four people and a significant amount of luggage in the trunk, thus fulfilling the projected expectations of the customers. The car had a double wishbone suspension in the front and semi-elliptical leaf springs in the rear.

The name "Publica" was chosen with reference to the English phrase "public car", referring to the car's intended attainability and popularity. Due to lack of distinction between the "l" and "r" consonants in Japanese the name can be sometimes misinterpreted as paprika. The name is transliterated as "パブリカ" in Katakana, literally paburika.

== P10 series ==
P10 Series
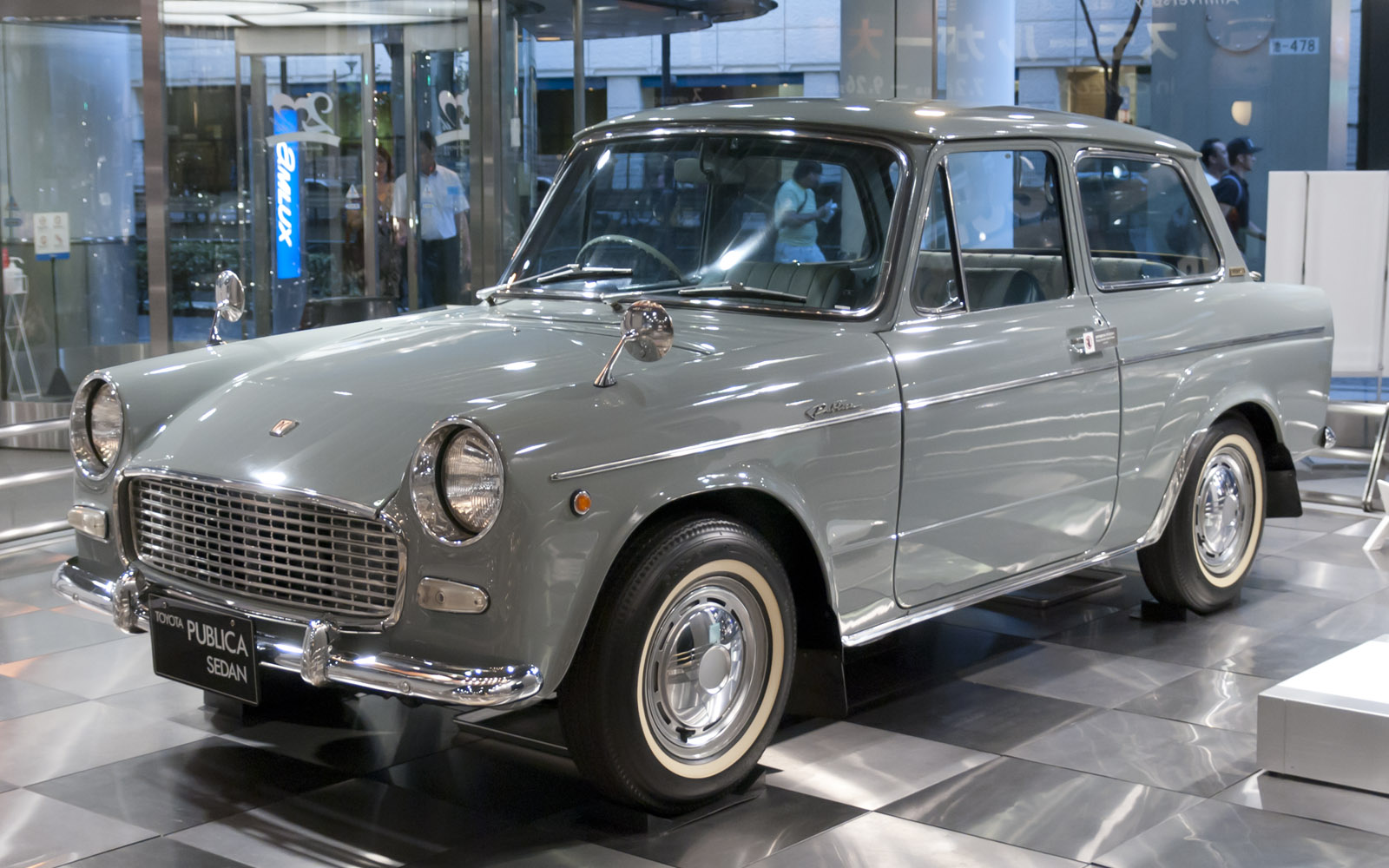
- Toyota Publica DeLuxe (UP10D)

Overview
- Also called: Toyota 700
- Production: June 1961–1966
- Assembly: Japan: Toyota, Aichi (Motomachi Plant: 1961–1968)
- Designer: Tatsuo Hasegawa

Body and chassis
- Body style: 2-door sedan (UP10/10D); 3-door van/station wagon (UP16V); 2-door convertible (UP10S); 2-door coupe utility (pickup; UP16)
- Layout: FR

Powertrain
- Engine: 697 cc U air-cooled OHV H2
- Transmission: 4-speed manual; 2-speed automatic (A20)

Dimensions
- Wheelbase: 2,130 mm (83.9 in)
- Length: 3,520 mm (138.6 in)
- Width: 1,415 mm (55.7 in)
- Height: 1,203 mm (47.4 in)
- Curb weight: 580 kg (1,279 lb)

The new car was given the internal designation of "UP10" and the market name of "Publica" and was sold through a new dealer network, separate from the previous "Toyota" and "Toyopet" dealerships, called Toyota Publica Store (later renamed as Toyota Corolla Store). Sales began in June 1961, with the basic price of ¥389,000. Initially, the car was very basic, lacking even such basic options like a radio or even a heater. This limited its appeal to the consumers, who perceived the automobile as an aspirational good and expected it to exude a more luxurious impression.

The now defunct Central Motors produced the Publica convertible from October 1963.

=== Further development of the UP10 series ===
In 1962, a two-door "light van" version was added, essentially a station wagon but classified as a commercial vehicle in Japan. A derivative model, Toyota Sports 800 (marketed initially as "Publica Sport") debuted at the 1962 Tokyo Motor Show. In 1963 Toyota added a new Deluxe trim level, denoted internally as "type UP10D", which featured such "luxuries" as reclining seats, a heater, radio, as well as some chrome decors (the original model was now called Standard). With the appearance of the Deluxe, demand finally picked up, and when the convertible model was added the same year, sales of the Publica finally reached the target level of 3000–4000 monthly. In February 1964, a coupe utility (pickup) model joined the lineup, and in September the engine got a power boost to 32 PS (24 kW), while the Deluxe trim level was also made available for the wagon version.

As a first for this class in Japan, Toyota also offered a two-speed semi-automatic option, called the Toyoglide (coded as A20). These are very rare nowadays, since most mechanics of that era had little knowledge in how to repair automatic transmissions.

In November 1964, it was introduced in Canada as one of the first two Toyota models available in the country, the other being the S40 Crown.

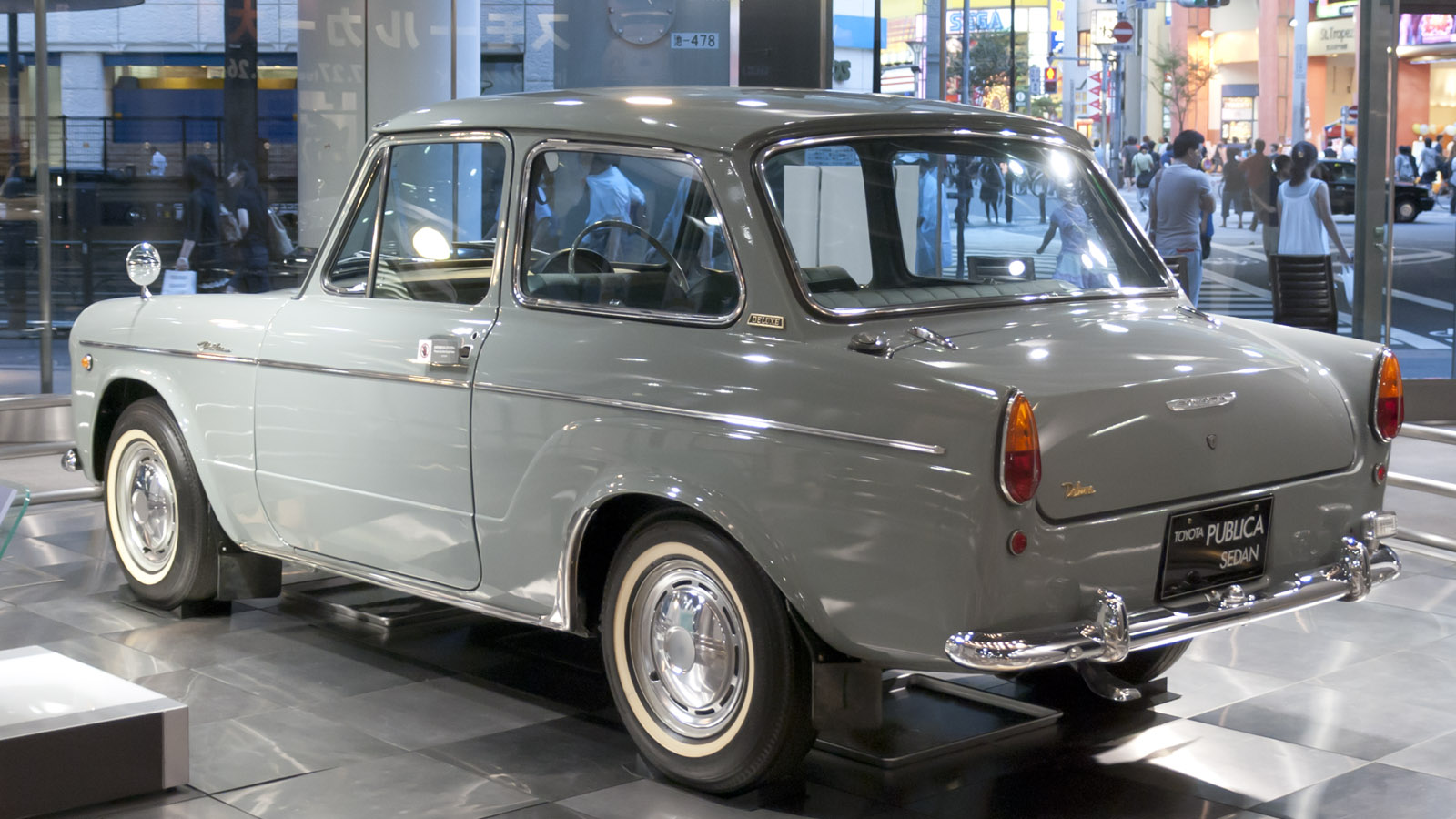
Toyota Publica DeLuxe (UP10D) rear view

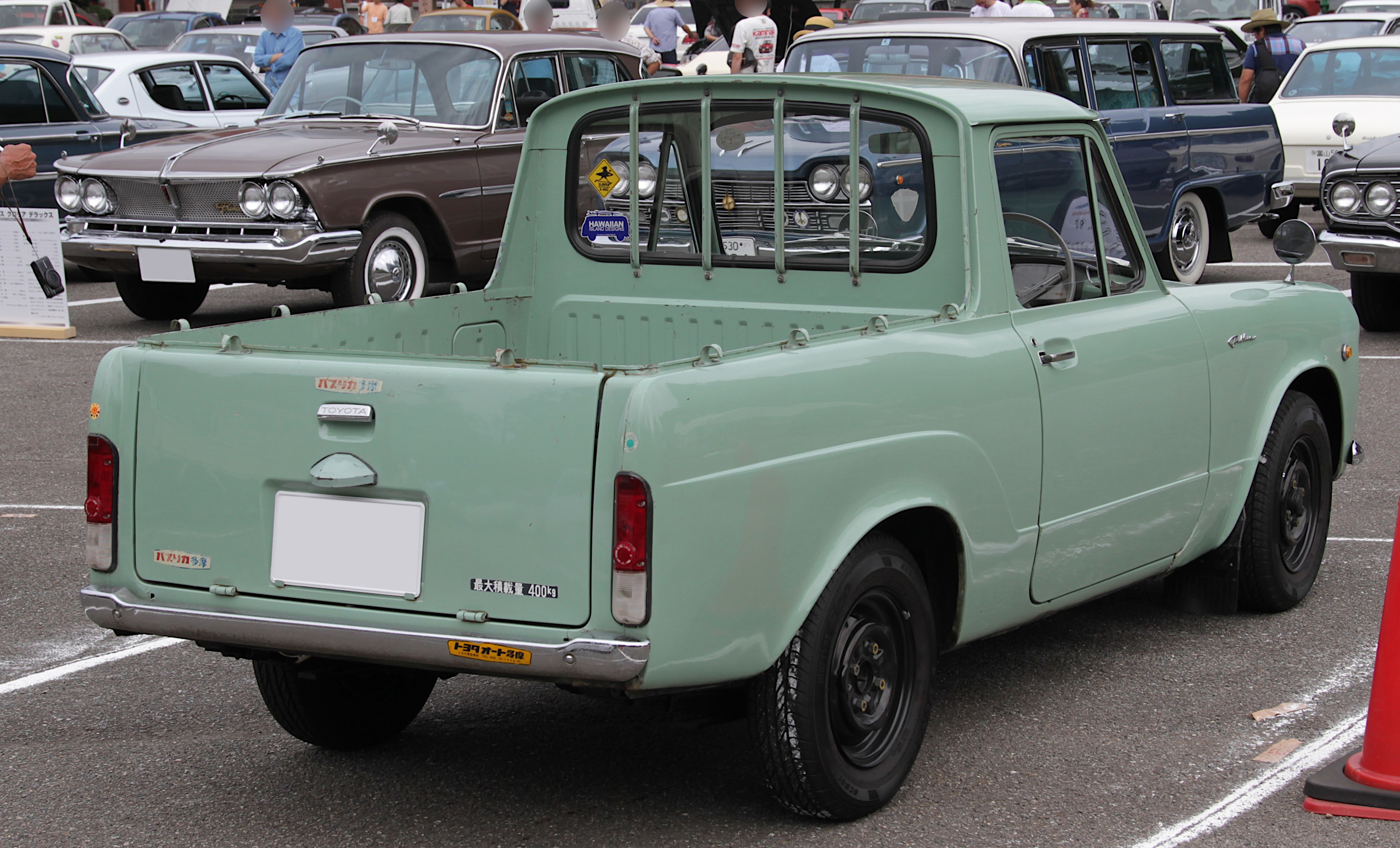
Toyota Publica Truck (UP16)

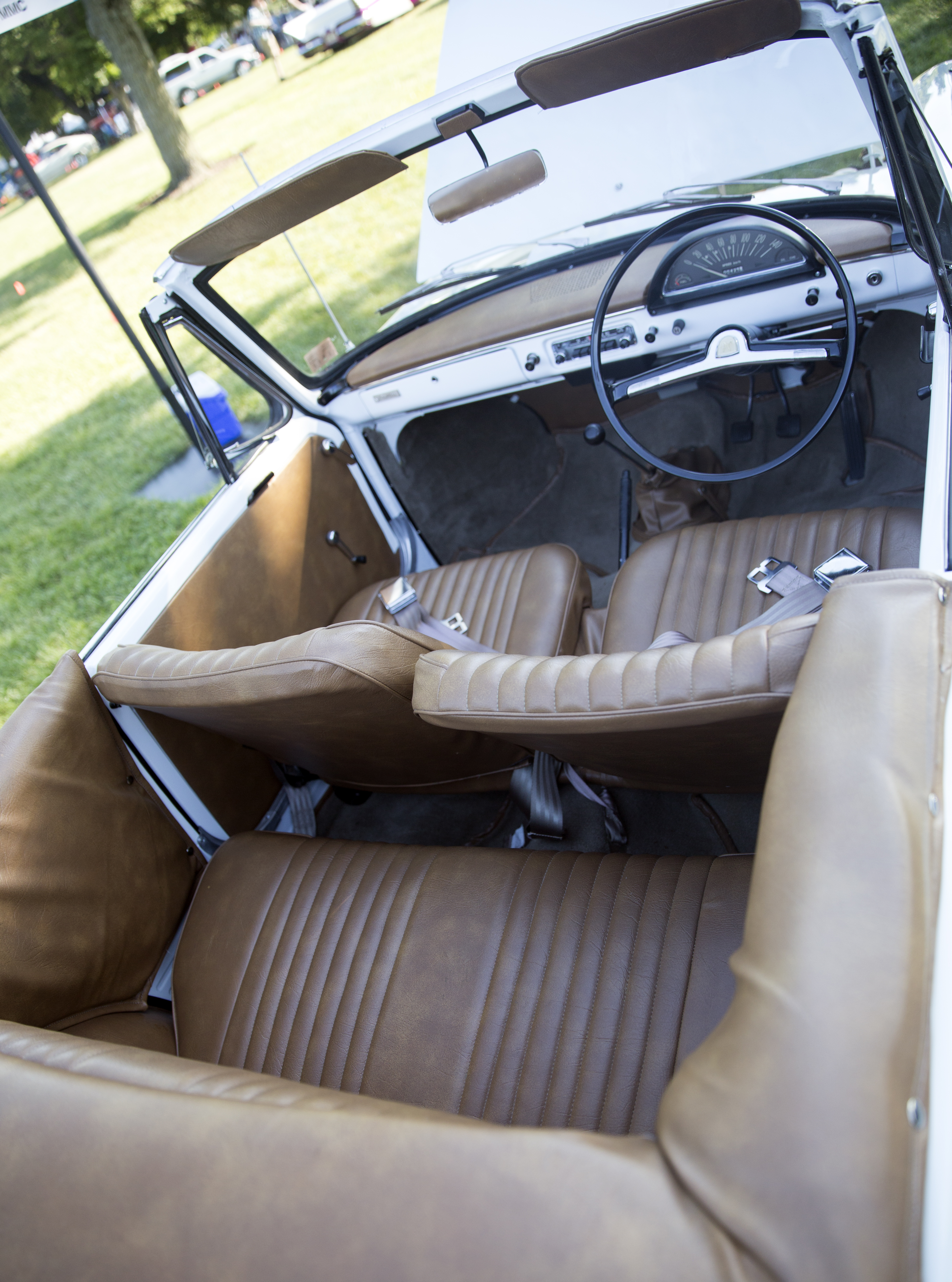
Interior of a Publica Convertible (UP10S)

== P20 Series ==
P20 Series
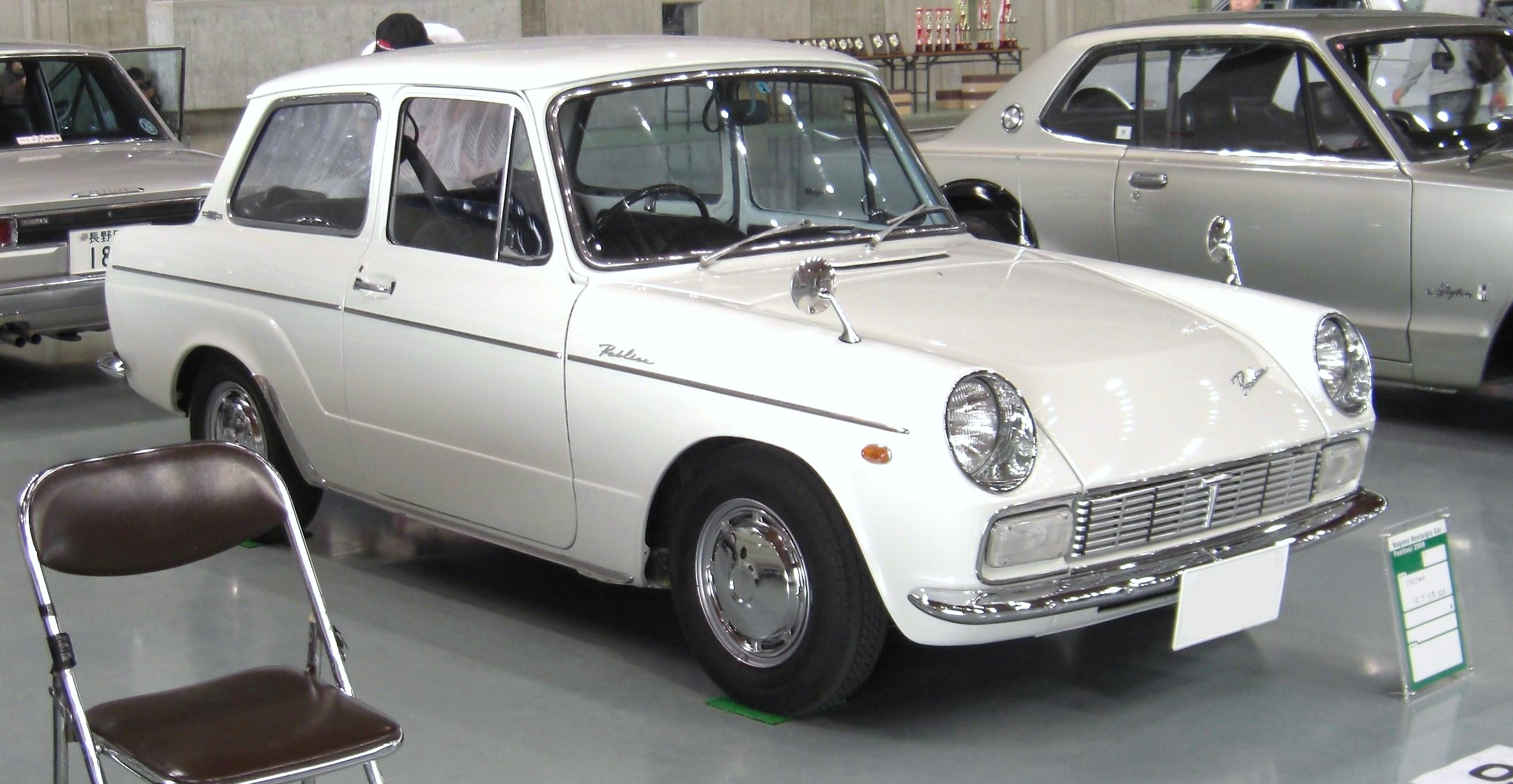
- Toyota Publica 800 Deluxe (UP20D)

Overview
- Production: 1966 – April 1969 (Japan); 1967 – 1971 (South Korea, Shinjin Motor)
- Assembly: Japan: Toyota, Aichi (Takaoka Plant: 1967–1970); South Korea: Bupyeong-gu

Body and chassis
- Body style: 2-door sedan 3-door van/station wagon 2-door convertible 2-door detachable top 2-door coupe utility (pickup)
- Layout: FR
- Related: Toyota MiniAce

Powertrain
- Engine: 790 cc 2U air-cooled OHV H2
- Transmission: 4-speed manual 2-speed automatic ("Toyoglide")

Dimensions
- Wheelbase: 2,130 mm (83.9 in)
- Length: 3,520 mm (138.6 in)
- Width: 1,415 mm (55.7 in)
- Height: 1,203 mm (47.4 in)
- Curb weight: 580 kg (1,279 lb)

In 1966, Toyota launched the revised Publica range, designated UP20 next to the all-new Toyota Corolla E10. The engine displacement was increased from 697 cc to 790 cc, and claimed power output from 35 PS to 36 PS (the engine was now called 2U) while the convertible received the 45 PS (33 kW) twin carburetor engine from the Sports 800. Since October that year, the dealers were operating under the "Toyota Publica" (rather than just "Publica") brand, and the base price was reduced to ¥359,000 for 1967 - as the US dollar stood at about ¥360 at that time, Toyota marketed the Publica as the "1000 dollar car". The Publica dealerships were later renamed "Toyota Corolla Store" after the popularity of the Corolla won out over the Publica as an affordable, small car.

In 1966, Toyota also launched the Toyota MiniAce cab over van, based on the UB20 Publica. In March 1968 the production of the Publica Van version was moved to Hino Motors, after that company was taken over by Toyota. 1968 also saw the launch of Publica Super version, which came with the engine of the Sports 800. The P20 Publica was replaced by the all-new P30 series in April 1969.

The former Central Motors produced the Publica convertible until December 1968.

Sales of the P10 and P20 Publicas:

Year	Production	Year	Production
1961	8,187	1965	43,437
1962	18,933	1966	48,415
1963	28,181	1967	42,197
1964	42,218	1968	37,262

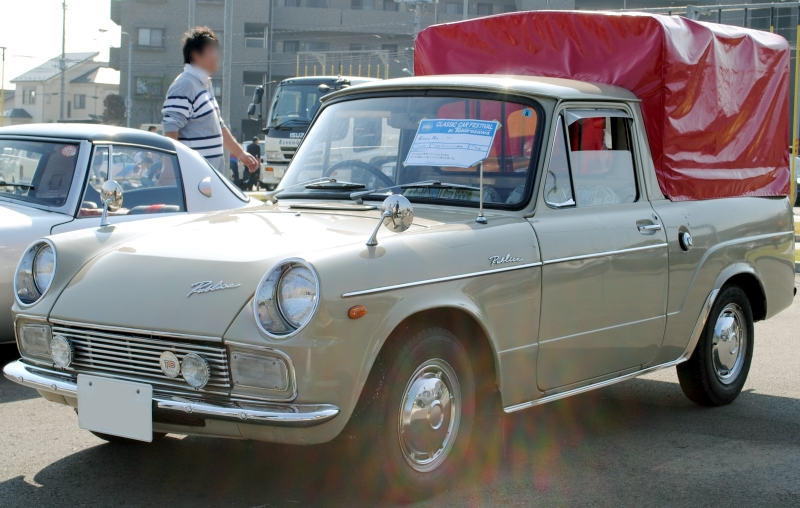
Toyota Publica 800 Truck (UP26)

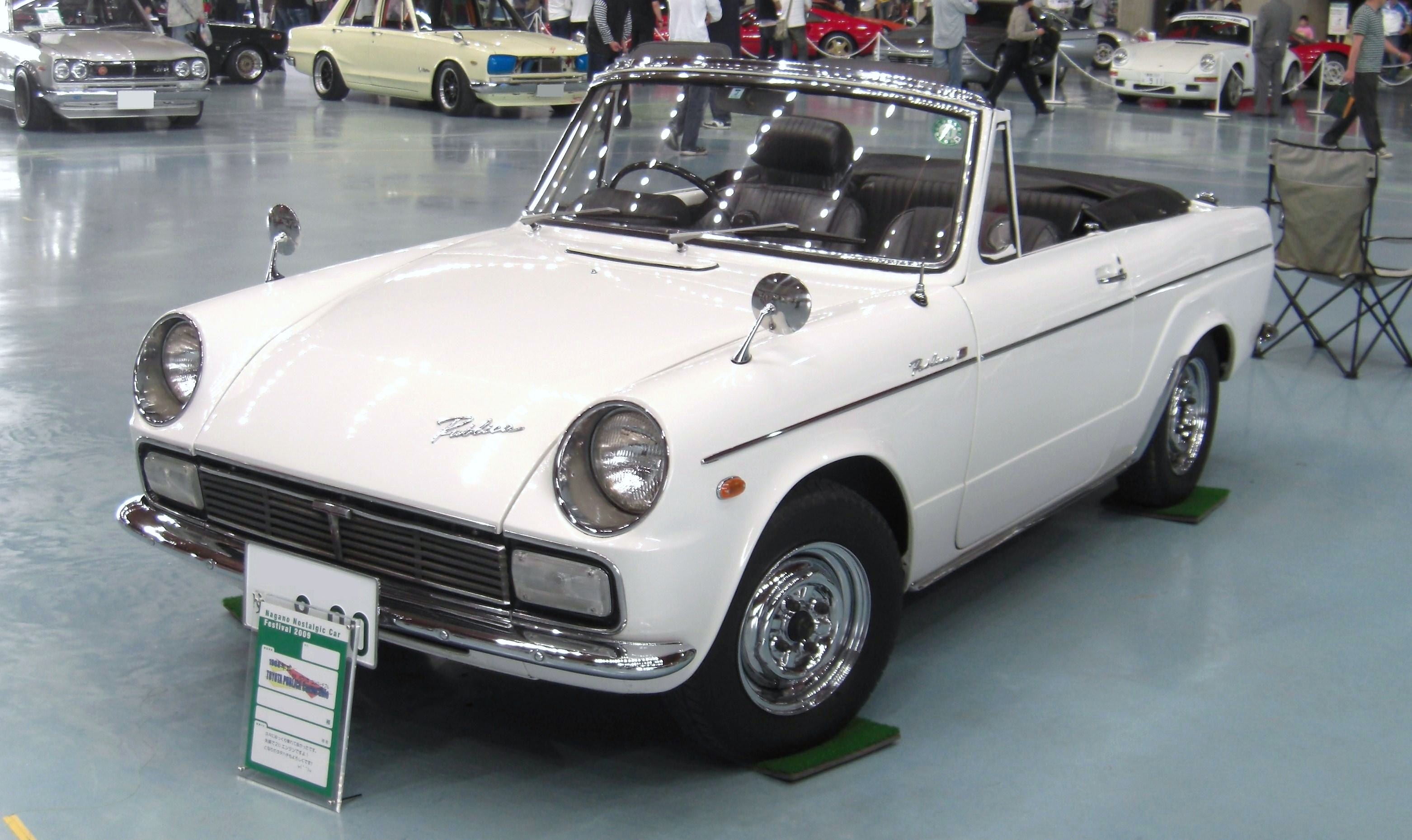
Toyota Publica 800 Convertible (UP20S)

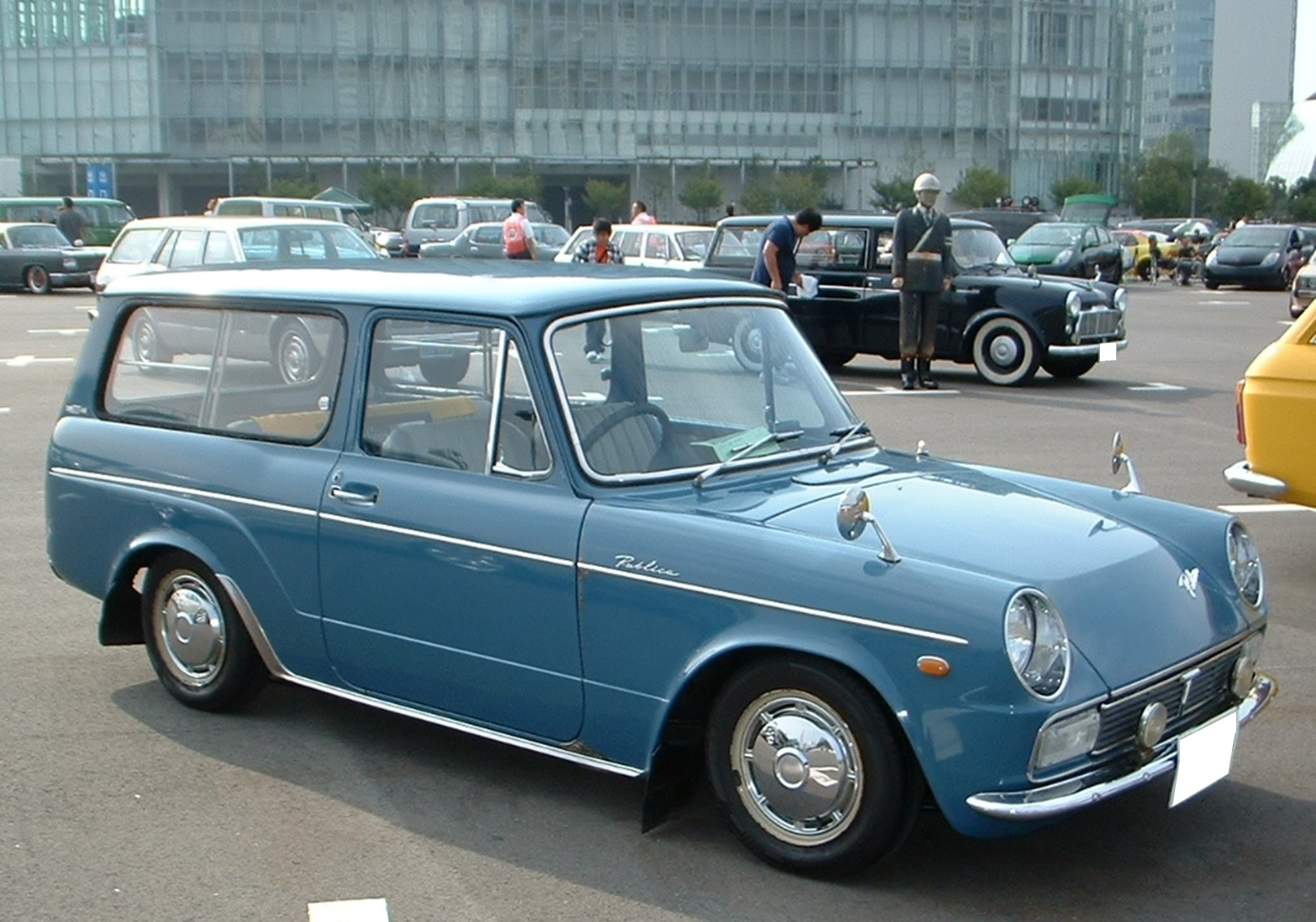
Toyota Publica 800 Van DeLuxe (UP26V-D)

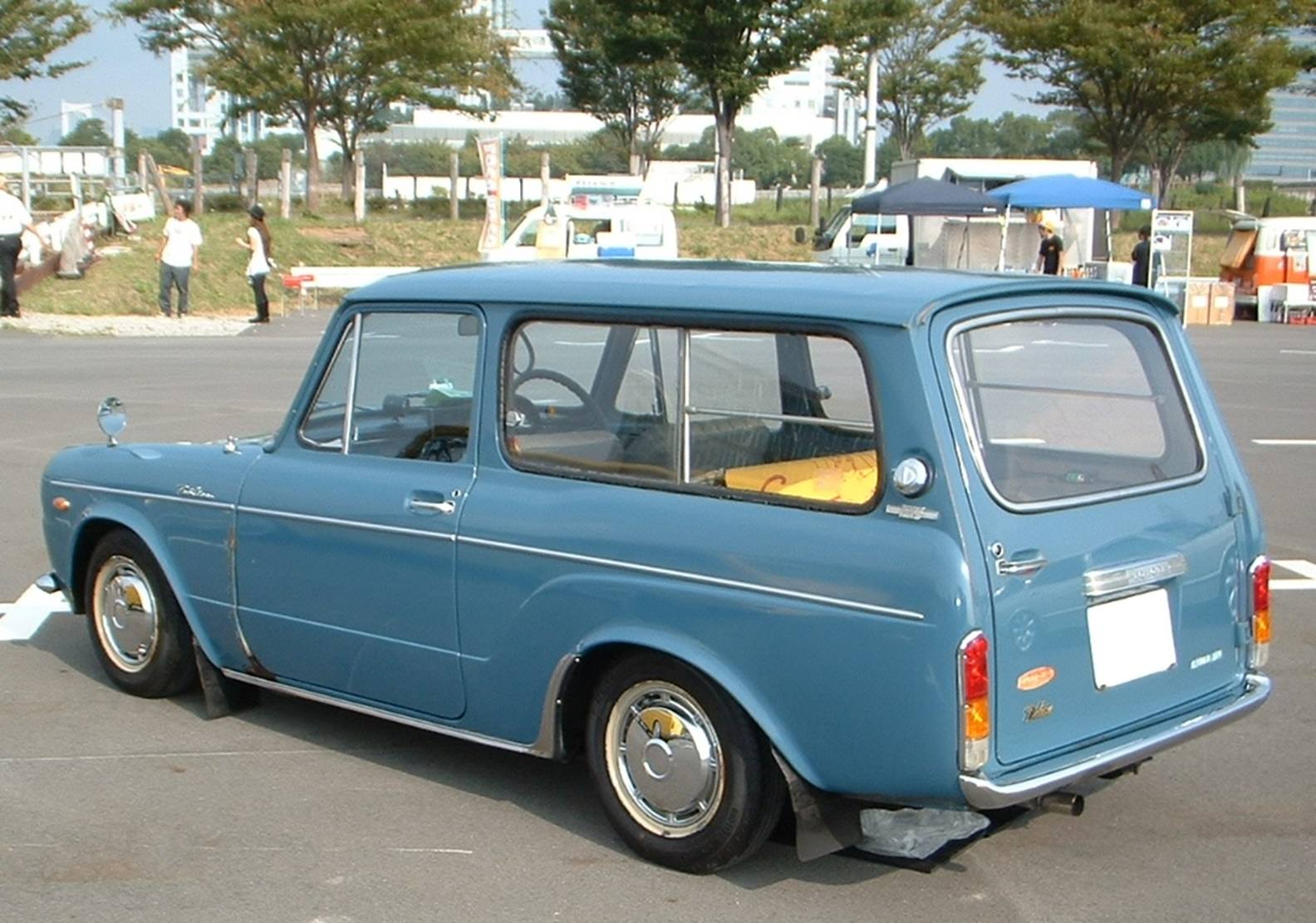
Toyota Publica 800 Van DeLuxe (UP26V-D) rear view

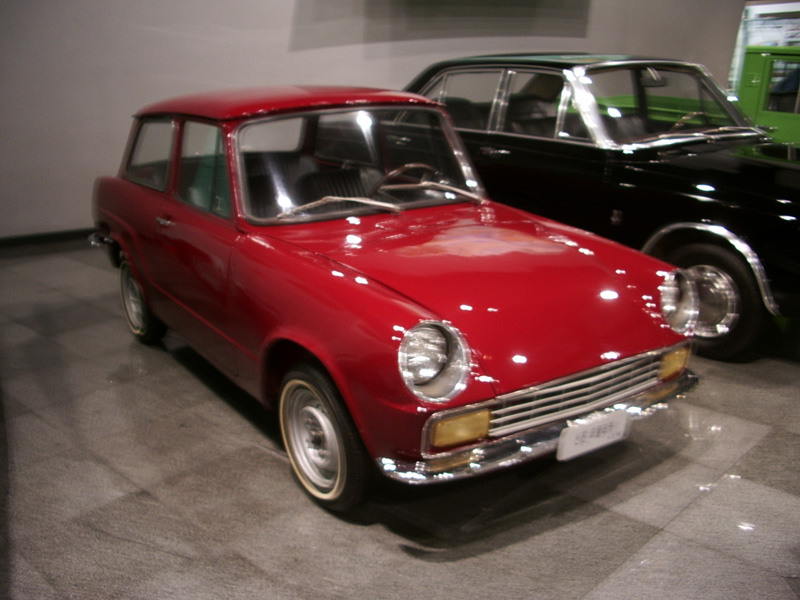
1967 Shinjin Publica

== P30 Series ==
P30/50 Series
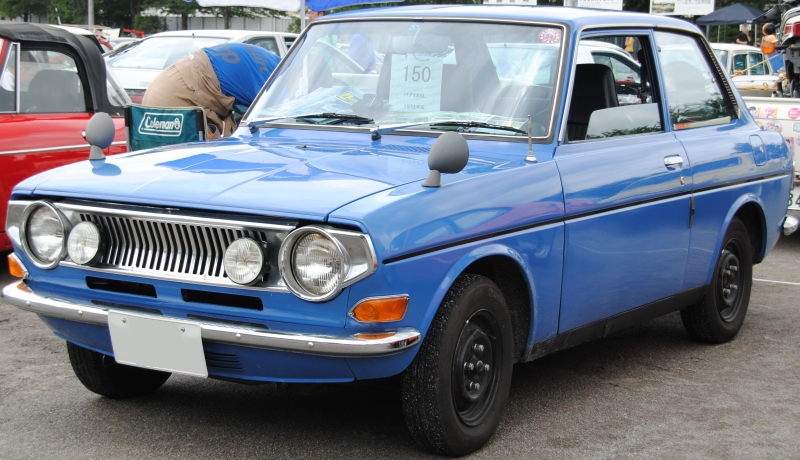
- Toyota Publica 1200 SL sedan (KP31S, Japan, first facelift)

Overview
- Also called: Toyota 1000; Toyota 1000 Copain; Toyota Osaka (Belgium); Toyota Timangi (Finland); Daihatsu Consorte
- Production: April 1969–January 1978 (sedan/fastback); April 1969–June 1979 (wagon/van); October 1969–August 1988 (pickup)
- Assembly: Japan: Ikeda, Osaka (Daihatsu Factory); Japan: Hamura, Tokyo (Hino)

Body and chassis
- Body style: 2-door sedan 2-door fastback sedan (facelift); 2-door coupé utility (pickup); 3-door wagon/van
- Layout: FR

Powertrain
- Engine: 790 cc 2U air-cooled OHV H2; 993 cc 2K I4; 1,077 cc K I4; 1,166 cc 3K I4; 1,290 cc 4K-J I4 (late pickups)
- Transmission: 4-speed manual K40; 5-speed manual K50; 2-speed automatic A20 "Toyoglide"

Dimensions
- Wheelbase: 2,160 mm (85.0 in); 2,280 mm (89.8 in) (pickup)
- Length: 3,645 mm (143.5 in); van: 3,705 mm (145.9 in); pickup: 3,835 mm (151.0 in)
- Width: 1,450–1,490 mm (57.1–58.7 in)
- Height: 1,380–1,390 mm (54.3–54.7 in)
- Curb weight: 635–705 kg (1,400–1,554 lb)

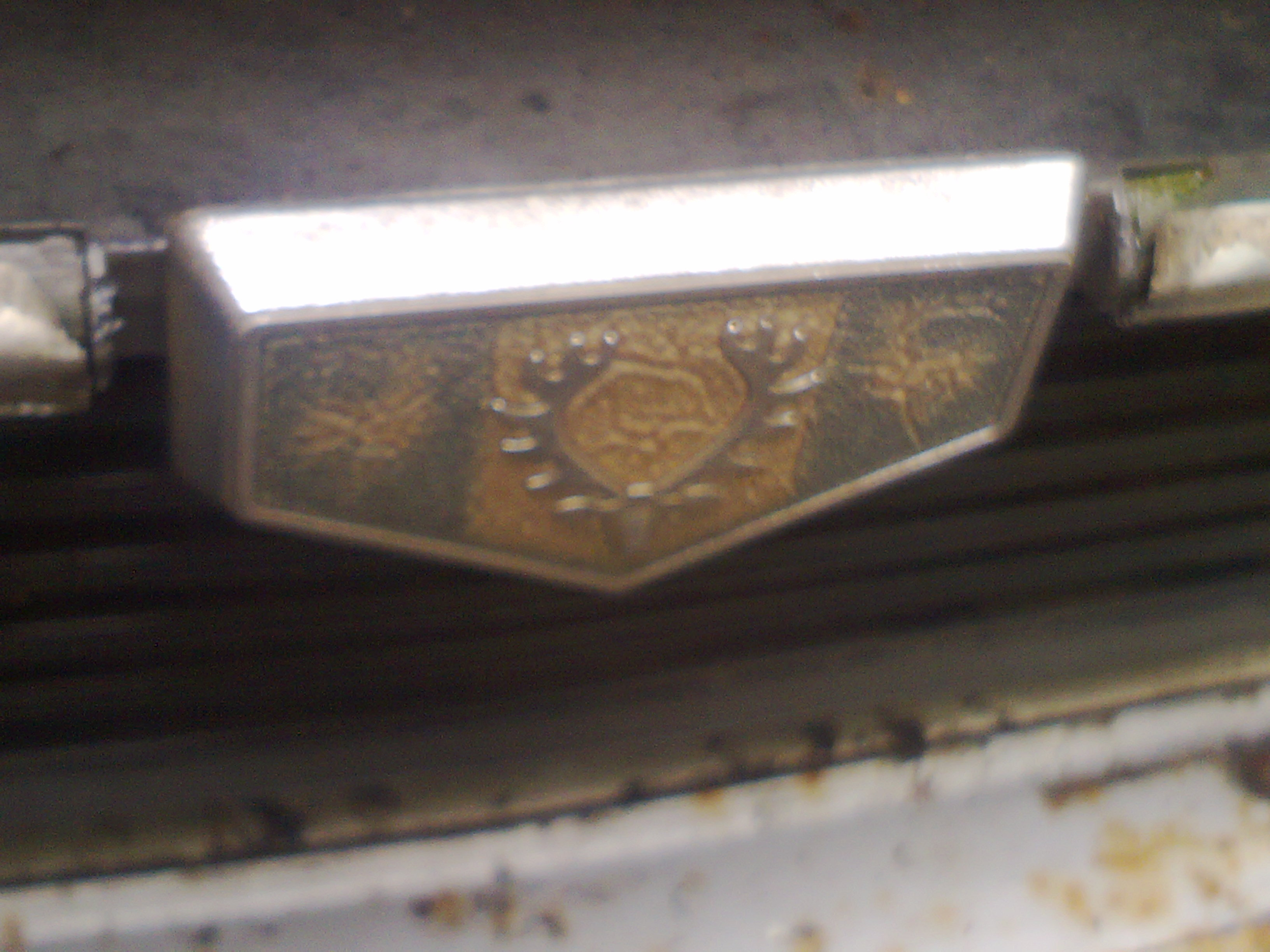
The badge of the Toyota Publica van

In April 1969, a whole new generation of the Publica was launched. The car was effectively now a scaled down version of the Corolla, sitting on a shortened Corolla wheel-base. While the air-cooled 790 cc 2U engine was retained in the cheapest domestic market versions, the cornerstone of the lineup was now the new K-series four-cylinder, water-cooled 993 cc engine (designated 2K) with 58 PS (43 kW), a lower-displacement version of the 1,077 cc engine used in the contemporary Toyota Corolla. The Publica 800 (UP30) has 40 PS (29 kW) and a top speed of only 120 km/h (75 mph), while the 1100 SL could reach 155 km/h (96 mph). The 800 and 1000 were available with Standard or Deluxe equipment, both in Sedan and Van bodystyles. The lower-geared Van was slower, with claimed top speeds of 115 and 135 km/h (71 and 84 mph) for the respective versions.

When the Corolla underwent a facelift in October 1969, the Publica SL's engine was upgraded to a 1.2-litre unit as per the Corolla. Power increased from 73 to 77 PS (54 to 57 kW). In March 1971 an even sportier version called the SR ("Sports Rally") was added, and the 1200 engine also found its way into a well-equipped variant called the Hi-Deluxe. The SR was equipped with radial tires, disc brakes up front, firmer suspension, and a tachometer. In period testing, it was criticized for the radial tires being unpredictable near the limit, with high grip but no feedback and the car threatening to roll over under hard driving.

Originally a two-door sedan and a three-door wagon (called Van in Japan, as it was intended for commercial use) were available. The pickup version, added in October 1969, was now officially known as "pickup". The pickup was originally only available with the 1.0-litre engine, although the 1.2 was made available after the January 1972 facelift. The situation in the Japanese market changed, as demand developed rapidly, partially fuelled by the post-WWII baby boomers coming of age and gaining their driver's licenses. Having the Corolla firmly established as the family car offering, Toyota did not market the Publica as the "popular car" anymore, but rather as an entry-level vehicle for first-time young buyers.

Many of the commercial iterations of the Publica were built by Hino Motors at their Hamura plant, beginning in 1970. Daihatsu also built Publicas, starting in September 1969. In 1969, the Publica dealerships were renamed "Toyota Corolla" dealerships.

=== Daihatsu Consorte ===
As Toyota had just started its relationship with Daihatsu in 1969, the latter launched the Daihatsu Consorte, which was essentially a mildly restyled P30 Publica. It was, however, powered by Daihatsu's own 1.0-litre "FE" engine for the lower models, which had already seen service in the previous Daihatsu model, the Compagno. The equivalent wagon/van version was not available for Daihatsu.

=== Facelifts and Starlet ===
October 1970 saw minor changes to the range, including a new instrument panel, and a new High Deluxe version featuring the single-carburetor version of the 1.2 L engine and front disc brakes. A more substantial facelift took place in January 1972, when the KP30 Publica was given new front and rear fascias and a new "semi-fastback" style. The U-engine model was dropped at this time, as the boxer unit could not clear emission standards anymore. 1973 saw the introduction of the Toyota Publica Starlet (designation KP40), a coupé version of the facelifted Publica. The last new version of the sedan was the KP50, a sedan version which featured the de-smogged 3K-U engine with 64 PS (47 kW). In June 1976 a five-speed transmission became available in the P50, the first Publica to be thus equipped. The facelifted sedan continued in production until February 1978, when it was replaced by the KP60, marketed as the Toyota Starlet. The Van (sometimes referred to as a Utility Wagon by Toyota) was built until June 1979, while the Publica pickup was not withdrawn until August 1988. Later pickups were fitted with the desmogged 1,166 cc 3K-HJ (from November 1975) and then the 1,290 cc 4K-J engines (from June 1979), although export versions retained the 1-litre 2K engine. The pickup also received a five-speed gearbox from August 1985.

Models

- UP30: 790 cc (2U-C/2U-B) sedan
- KP30: 993 cc (2K) sedan
- KP30-S: 1,077 cc (K-B) sedan, 1969.04–1969.09
- KP31: 1,166 cc (3K/3K-B/3K-BR) sedan
- UP36V: 790 cc (2U-C) van
- KP36/V: 993 cc (2K) pickup/van
- KP37/V: 1,166 cc (3K, 3K-H) pickup/van
- KP38: 1,166 cc (3K-HJ) pickup, emissions controls for commercial vehicle
- KP39: 1,290 cc (4K-J) pickup
- KP50: 1,166 cc (3K-U) sedan, emissions controlled engine (1976.01–1978.01)

=== Toyota 1000 ===
The P30 Publica with the 993 cc 2K engine was known as the Toyota 1000 in most markets outside Japan. With a DIN rating, the engine had 45 PS (33 kW) in export trim. Branded as the Toyota 1000, the car was launched on the West German market, at the time Europe's largest national auto-market, in the fourth quarter of 1974. It had an unusually lavish list of included features that included radial tyres, front headrests, tinted windows, a heated rear window and even a radio. In some European markets such as Switzerland and the Netherlands, it was marketed with the additional name "Copain". In Belgium it was sold as the "Toyota Osaka" for a while. Beginning in March 1976 the pickup version was sold in Finland as the Toyota Timangi. Popular with youth, it was so successful that the Finnish government rewrote the requirements for pickup trucks, which now required a cargo area of 185 cm (73 in) rather than 155 cm (61 in). The Timangi could no longer benefit from a variety of tax breaks for commercial vehicles and sales ended immediately, after 18 months and about 2,000 cars sold.

The Toyota 1000 sedans and wagons were replaced by the P60 Starlet in 1978 but the Toyota 1000 pick-up continued to be sold next to the Starlet sedans and wagons. The Toyota 1000 range included a two-door sedan, a three-door wagon, and a two-door coupé utility (pickup). In South Africa, the Toyota 1000 range also included a pick-up with the 1,166 cc 3K engine.

=== Gallery ===
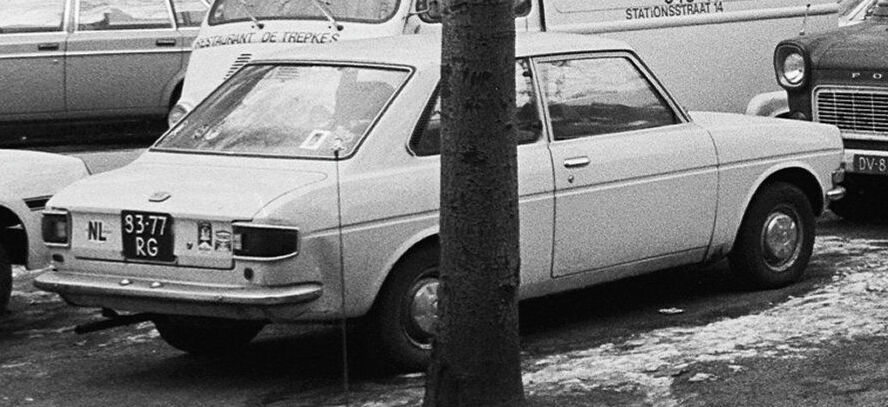
The original body style

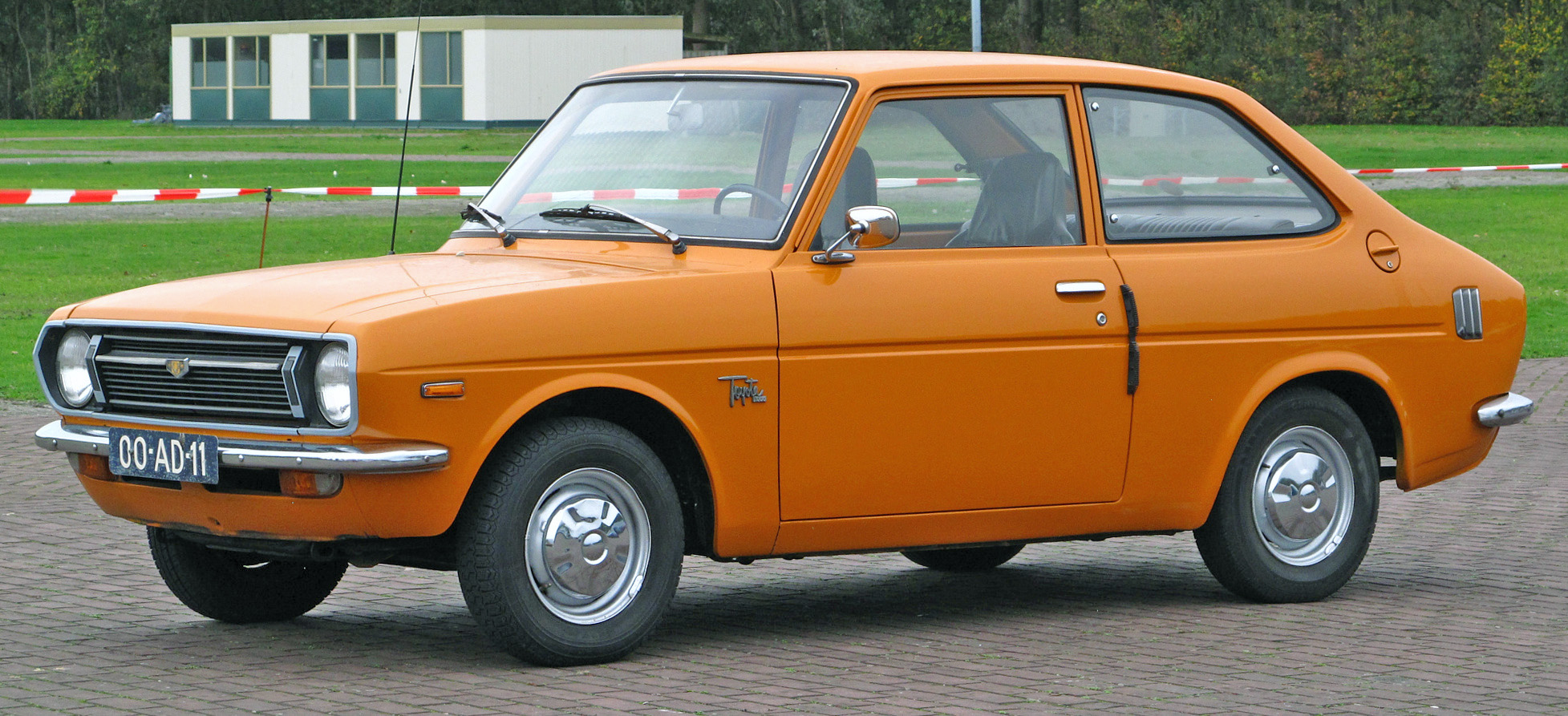
Toyota 1000 Special (KP30L, Europe, second facelift)

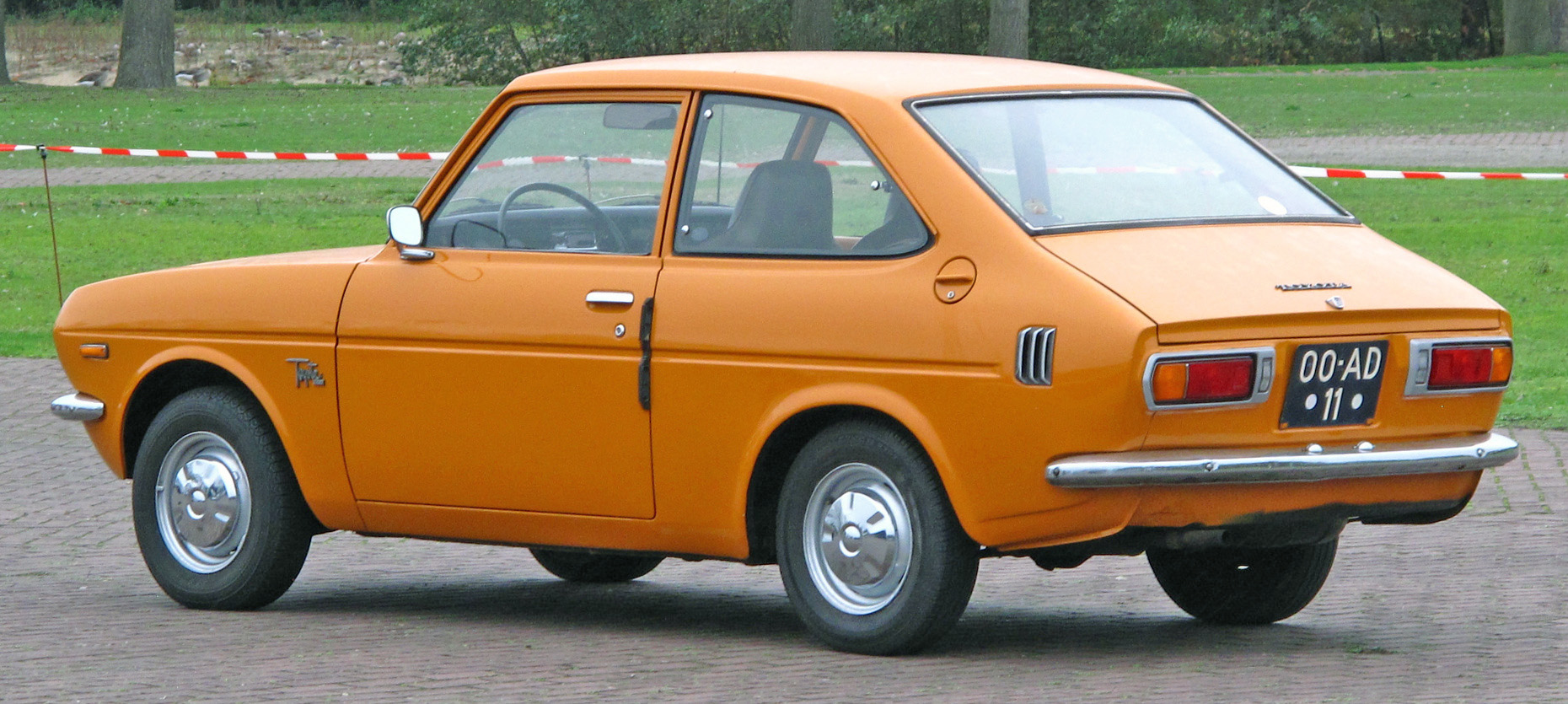
Rear view of the revised sedan with new fastback body style (KP30L, Europe, second facelift)

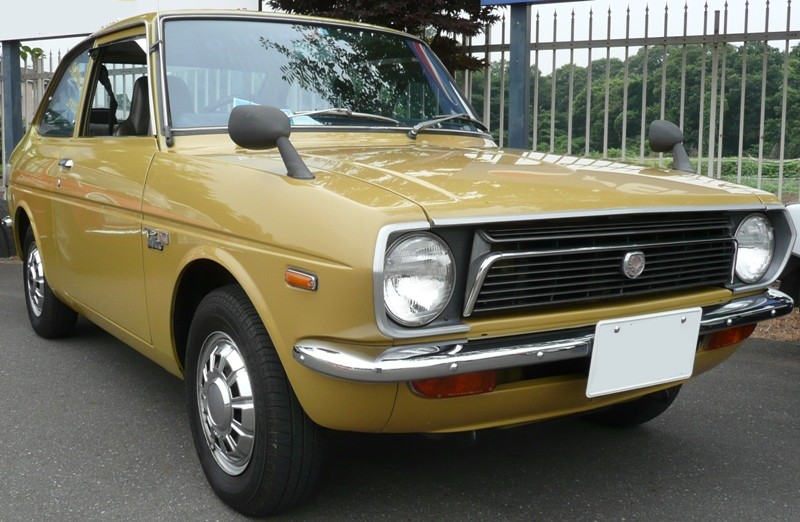
Toyota Publica 1200 sedan (KP50, Japan, third facelift)

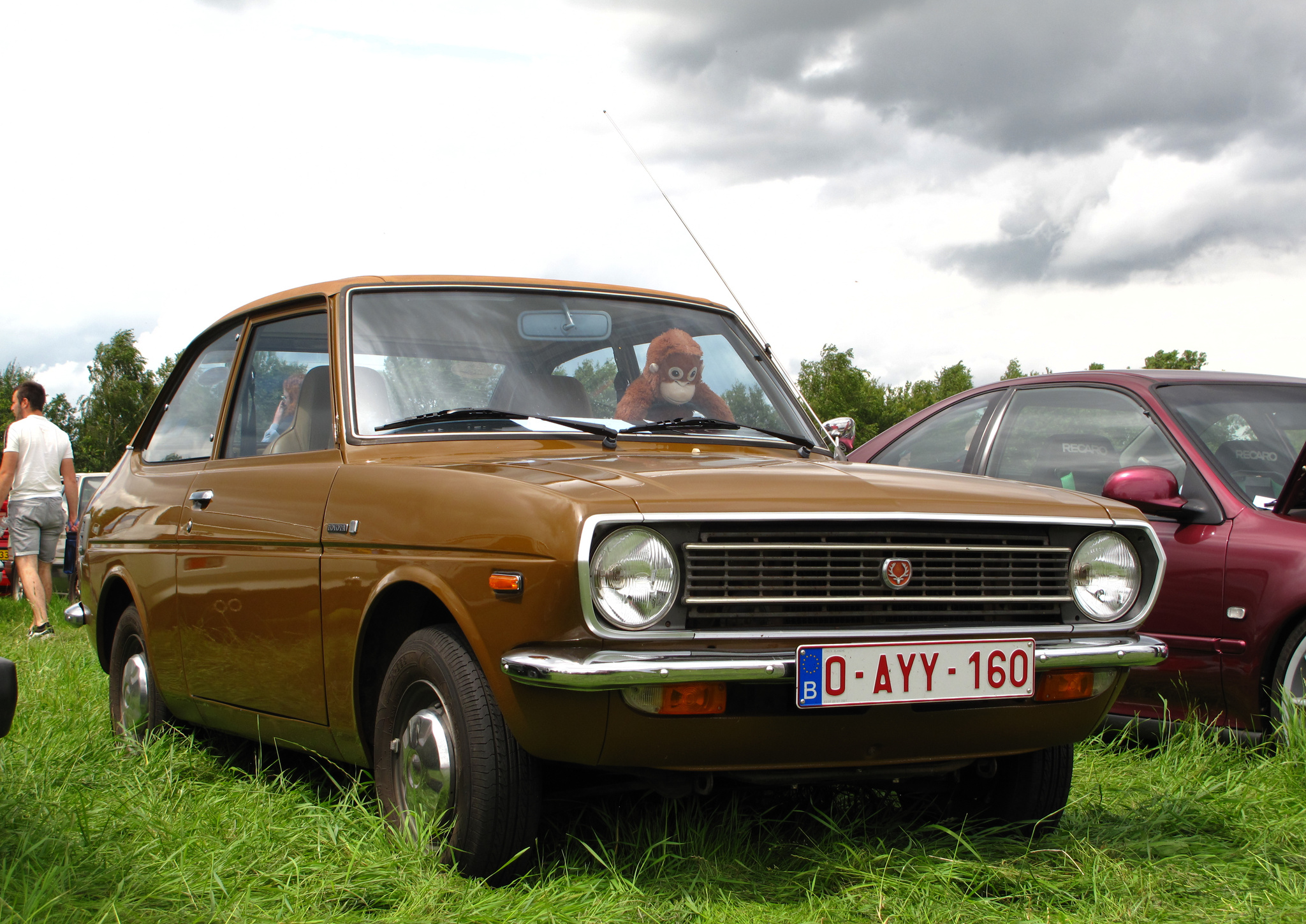
Toyota 1000 Deluxe sedan (KP30L, Europe, fourth facelift)

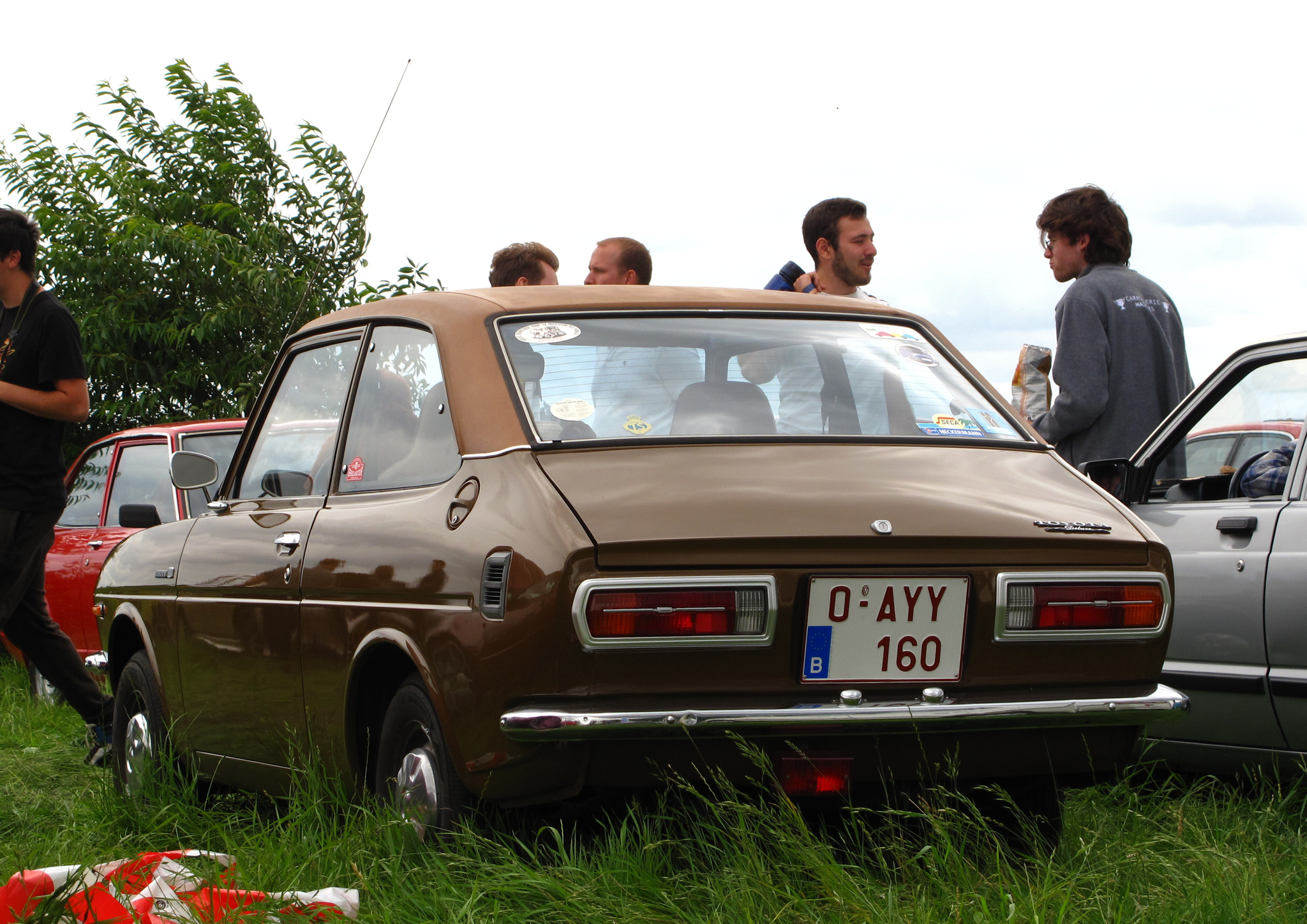
Toyota 1000 Deluxe sedan (KP30L, Europe, third and fourth facelift)

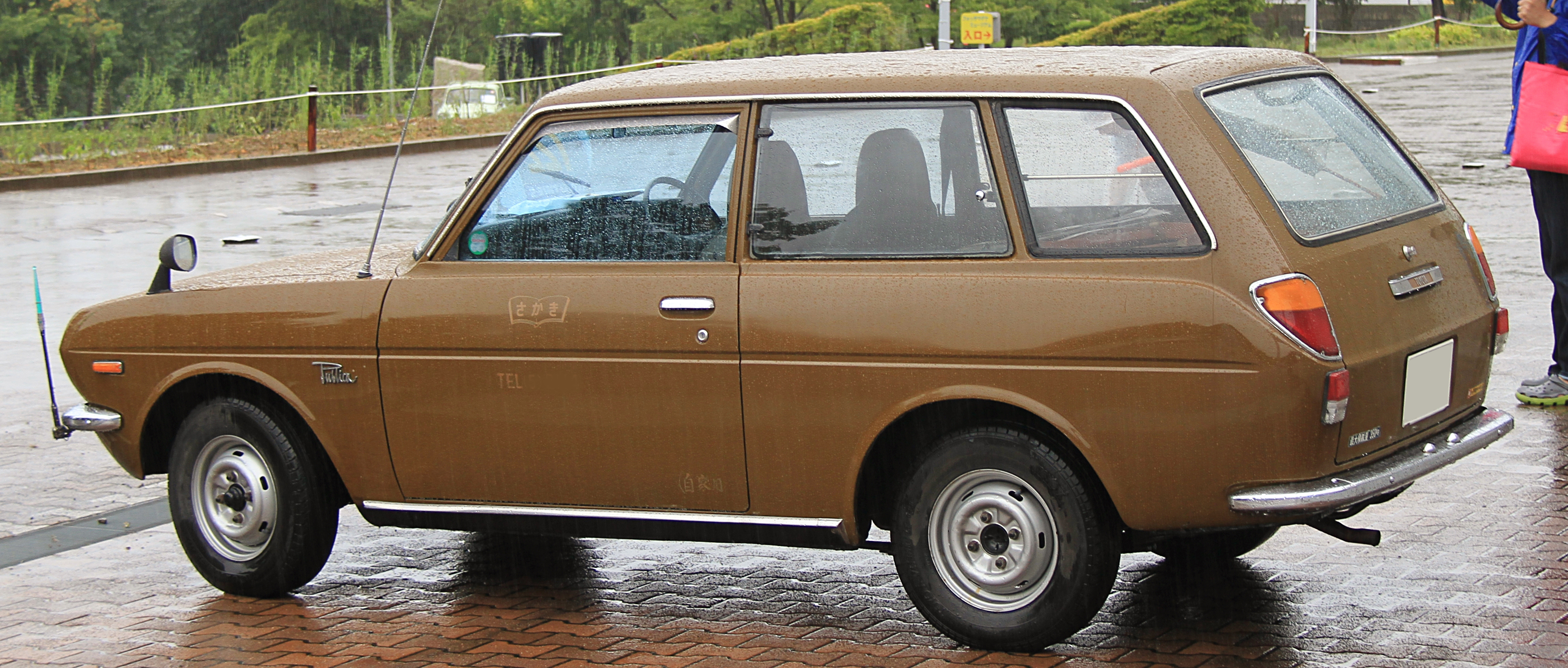
Rear view of the wagon/van

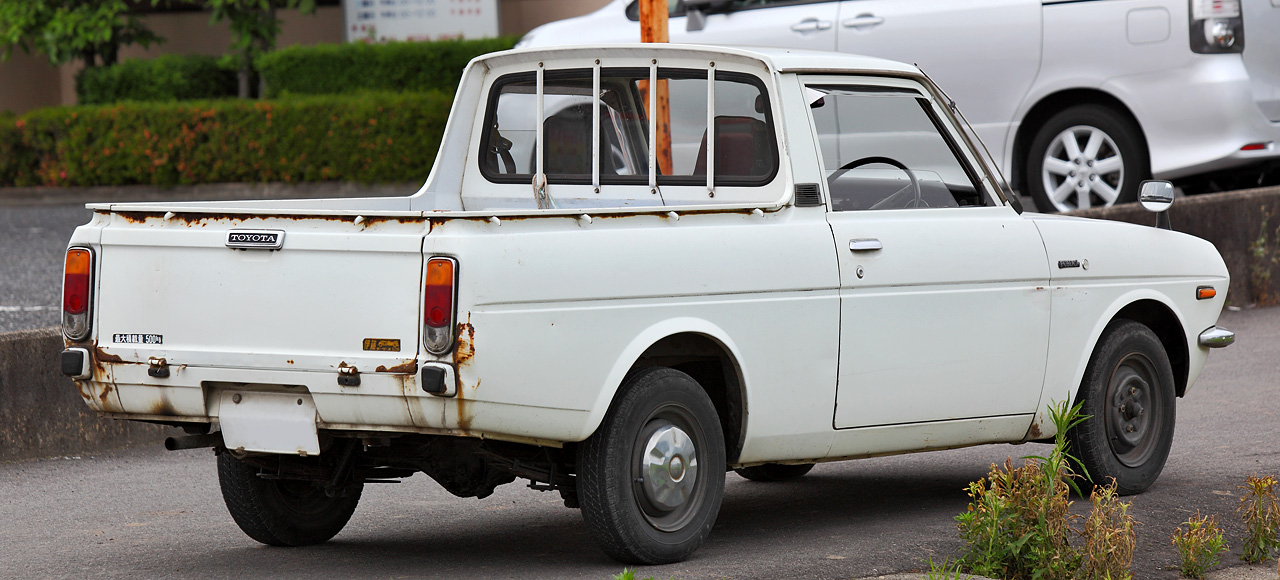
Rear view of the pickup truck

== See also ==
- List of Toyota vehicles
