= Nakajima Ki-87 =

Japanese fighter/interceptor prototype

Ki-87
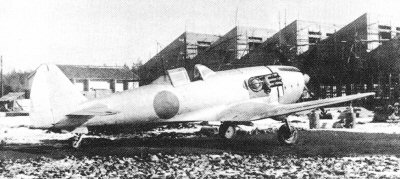

General information
- Type: High-altitude fighter-interceptor
- Manufacturer: Nakajima Aircraft Company
- Status: Prototype
- Primary user: Imperial Japanese Army Air Service
- Number built: 1

History
- First flight: April 1945

The Nakajima Ki-87 was a Japanese prototype, high-altitude fighter-interceptor of World War II. It was a single seat, exhaust-driven turbo-supercharged engined, low-wing monoplane with a conventional undercarriage.

== Design and development ==
The Ki-87 was developed in response to American B-29 Superfortress raids on the Home Islands. It followed up on earlier research by Nakajima and the Technical Division of Imperial Army Headquarters into boosting a large radial engine with an exhaust-driven turbo-supercharger, which had begun in 1942, well before the B-29 raids began. The efforts of the Technical Division of Imperial Army Headquarters eventually culminated into the Tachikawa Ki-94-I, while the Ki-87 was developed as a fall-back project, using less stringent requirements. Nakajima started in July 1943 with the construction of three prototypes, to be completed between November 1944 and January 1945, and seven pre-production aircraft, to be delivered by April 1945. The Technical Division of Imperial Army Headquarters made itself felt during the development of the Ki-87 prototype when they insisted upon placing the turbo-supercharger in the rear-fuselage, and, from the sixth prototype, the Nakajima fighter was to have that arrangement. The Ki-87 had a rearward folding undercarriage to accommodate the storage of ammunition for the cannons, which were mounted in the wing.

Construction was delayed due to problems with the electrical undercarriage and the turbo-supercharger, and the first prototype was not completed until February 1945. It first flew in April, but only five test flights were completed, all with the undercarriage in the extended position.

A further variant, the Ki-87-II, powered by a 3,000 hp (2,200 kW) Nakajima Ha-217 (Ha-46) engine and with the turbo-supercharger in the same position as the P-47 Thunderbolt, never went further than the drawing board.

== Operational history ==
Production of five-hundred aircraft was planned, but the War ended before any more than the single prototype were built.

== Aircraft markings ==
The sole completed prototype was in natural metal finish; some paintings show a black anti-glare area in front of the cockpit, but this is not seen on any of the known photographs of the plane. However, James P. Gallagher took a photo of the Ki-87 at the abandoned Japanese Army fighter base at Chofu after Japan's surrender. The photo clearly shows a black anti-glare area from the cockpit forward to the tip of the nose.

== Specifications (Ki-87 prototype) ==
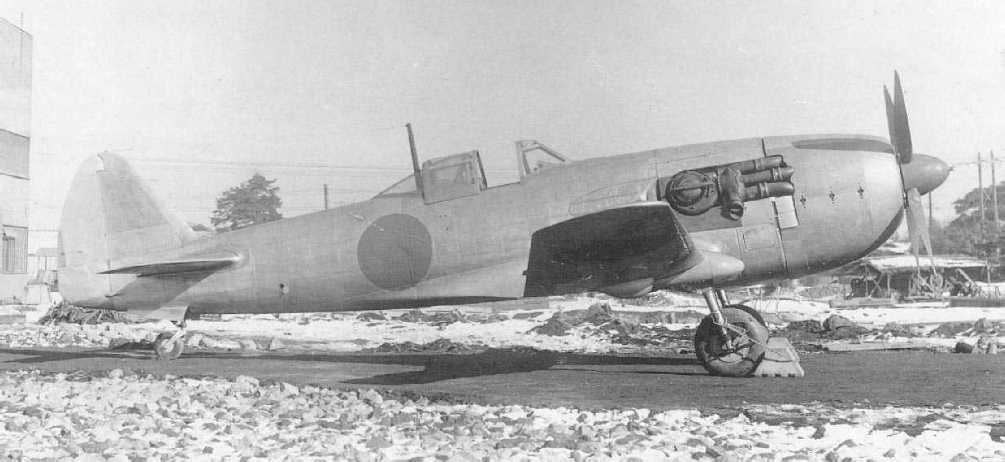
Another photograph of the first Ki-87 prototype, showing to advantage the turbo supercharger.

Data from Japanese Aircraft of the Pacific War; Japanese Army Fighters, Part 2; Famous Aircraft of the World, first series, no.76: Japanese Army Experimental Fighters (1)

General characteristics

- Crew: 1
- Length: 11.82 m (38 ft 9 in)
- Wingspan: 13.423 m (44 ft 0 in)
- Height: 4.503 m (14 ft 9 in)
- Wing area: 26 m^{2} (280 sq ft)
- Empty weight: 4,387 kg (9,672 lb)
- Gross weight: 5,632 kg (12,416 lb)
- Max takeoff weight: 6,100 kg (13,448 lb)
- Powerplant: 1 × Nakajima Ha219 Ru (Ha-44 Model 11) 18-cylinder air-cooled radial piston engine, 1,800 kW (2,400 hp) for take-off

1,600 kW (2,200 hp) at 1,500 m (4,900 ft)
1,530 kW (2,050 hp) at 6,000 m (20,000 ft)
1,380 kW (1,850 hp) at 10,500 m (34,400 ft)

- Propellers: 4-bladed constant-speed metal propeller

Performance

- Maximum speed: 706 km/h (439 mph, 381 kn) at 11,000 m (36,000 ft)
- Endurance: 2 hours
- Service ceiling: 12,855 m (42,175 ft)
- Time to altitude: 10,000 m (33,000 ft) in 14 minutes 12 seconds
- Wing loading: 216.6 kg/m^{2} (44.4 lb/sq ft)
- Power/mass: 0.3161 kW/kg (0.1923 hp/lb)

Armament

- Guns: 2 × 30 mm (1.18 in) Ho-155 cannon in the outer wing panels and 2 × 20 mm (0.79 in) synchronized Ho-5 cannon in the wing roots
- Bombs: 1 × 250 kg (550 lb) bomb under fuselage

== See also ==
Aircraft of comparable role, configuration, and era

- Blohm & Voss BV 155
- Curtiss XF14C
- Fisher P-75 Eagle
- Focke-Wulf Ta 152H
- Republic P-47N Thunderbolt
- Republic XP-72
- Tachikawa Ki-94-II
