= Nakajima Ha219 =

1940s Japanese piston aircraft engine

Ha219
- Type: 18-cylinder two-row radial aircraft engine
- National origin: Japan
- Manufacturer: Nakajima
- Number built: ~10

The Nakajima Ha219 (also known as the Ha-44 under the unified designation system, BH by the company and NK11A by the Imperial Japanese Navy Air Service (IJNAS)), was a late war Imperial Japanese Army Air Force (IJAAF) 2,461 hp (1,835 kW) 18-cylinder air-cooled radial engine, used on the Tachikawa Ki-94-II, Nakajima Ki-84-N and Nakajima Ki-87.

== Variants and designations ==
Data from: Japanese Aero-Engines 1910-1945

BH
Company designation
Ha219
IJAAF Hatsudoki designation

Ha219Ru fitted with a large turbo-charger alternative designation for the Ha-44 model 12

Ha-44
Unified (IJAAF & IJNAS) designation system

Ha-44 model 11 A prototype turbocharged 2,400 hp (1,800 kW) engine for the Ki-87.
Ha-44 model 12 Similar to the Model 11 and probably sporting a 16-bladed cooling fan in the cowling intake.
Ha-44 model 13 A planned variant to power the Navy 20-shi A Carrier Fighter

NK11A
Planned engines for a scaled down Nakajima G10N1 (Navy Experimental Heavy Bomber Fugaku) (Fugaku - Mount Fuji)

== Applications ==
A total of around 10 engines were built, but the engine suffered from over-heating at low speeds and required large amounts of maintenance. Around 7 were issued to the Kitai squadron in late 1945 and used on the new Ki-84-N, lacking the supercharger installed on the Ki-94-2 and Ki-87. most are believed to have been scrapped or destroyed after the war along with documentation.

- Nakajima Ki-87
- Nakajima G10N1 (Navy Experimental Heavy Bomber Fugaku)
- Nakajima Ki-84-N
- Tachikawa Ki-94-2

== Specifications (Ha219 / BH / NK11A / Ha-44) ==
Data from Japanese Aero-Engines 1910-1945

=== General characteristics ===
- Type: 18-cylinder air-cooled two-row radial piston engine
- Bore: 146 mm (5.75 in.)
- Stroke: 160 mm (6.30 in.)
- Displacement: 48.2 L (2,941 cu in.)
- Length: 1524 mm (60 in.)
- Diameter: 1280 mm (50.4 in.)
- Dry weight: 1,150 kg (2,535 lb)

=== Performance ===
- Power output: 2,400 hp (1,800 kW) at 2,700rpm
- Compression ratio: 7.2
- boost +350 mm Hg
