= Takaoka plant =

Production facility in Aichi, Japan

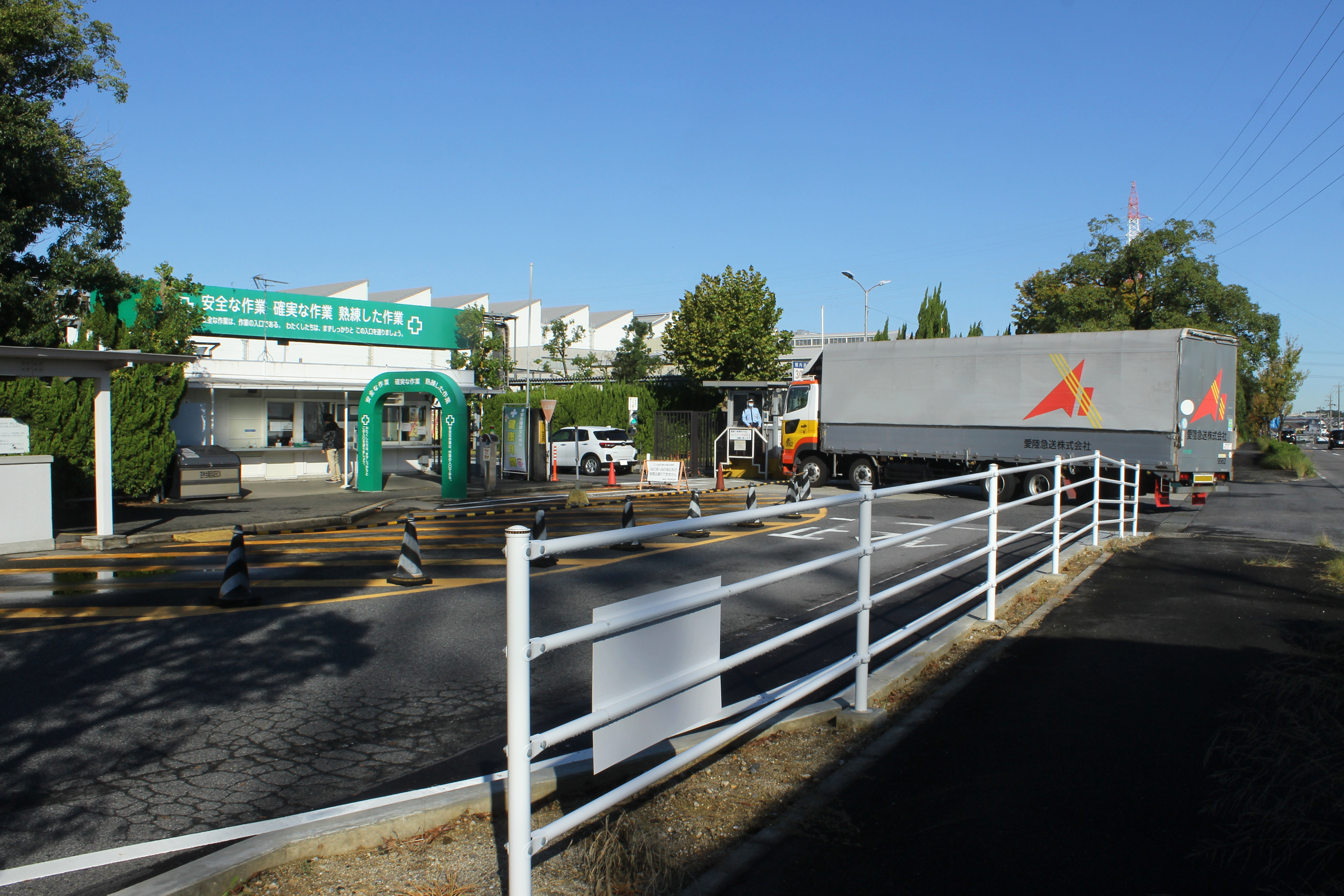
Toyota Takaoka Assembly Plant (2021)

The Toyota Takaoka Assembly Plant, also known as the Takaoka Plant, was built in Toyota City, Aichi, Japan in 1966 to build the first Corolla (series KE10). Production officially began January 1967 where production was transferred from the Motomachi plant.

The location continues to build the Corolla and RAV4, and was the manufacturing location for past and current models that included the Publica, Sprinter, Carina, Tercel, Cynos, Prius, and the C-HR+. Its current size is 1,310,000 m^{2} (14,100,000 sq ft) and employs 3,150 people. This number of employees is from December 2011, and excludes fixed-term employees and short-term employees.

It also serves as a support location for various Toyota assembly locations internationally.
