= Tatsuo Hasegawa =

Japanese automotive engineer (1916–2008)

Tatsuo Hasegawa 長谷川 龍雄
- Born: February 8, 1916; Tottori, Tottori prefecture
- Died: April 29, 2008 (aged 92); Yokohama, Kanagawa Prefecture
- Education: Tokyo Imperial University
- Engineering career
- Discipline: Aeronautics
- Significant design: Toyota Corolla; Toyota Publica
- Awards: Japan Automobile Hall of Fame (2004)

Tatsuo Hasegawa (長谷川 龍雄, Hasegawa Tatsuo, February 8, 1916 – April 29, 2008) was a Japanese automotive engineer, and known as the development chief of the first Toyota Corolla. He built the base of the economy cars in Japan through the development of the Corolla and the Toyota Publica.

== Early years ==
Tatsuo Hasegawa was born in Tottori, Tottori Prefecture on February 8, 1916. After majoring in aerodynamics as a self-supporting student, he graduated from the Section of Aeronautics of the Faculty of Engineering at the Tokyo Imperial University in 1939.

== Tachikawa Ki-94 ==
After graduating, Hasegawa joined Tachikawa Aircraft Corporation and was involved in the development of the Tachikawa Ki-94 in 1943 as the chief designer. This high-altitude interceptor aircraft was designed to intercept American B-29 bombers, and proposed to the Imperial Japanese Army. Although one aircraft was completed in August 1945, World War II ended before the aircraft ever conducted its first flight.

Before the start of development of the Ki-94, Hasegawa had designed an airfoil based on his theory, and published a paper in the scholarly journal of the Japan Society for Aeronautical Sciences (now The Japan Society for Aeronautical and Space Sciences) in March, 1942. He named it "TH airfoil theory" after his name (Tatsuo Hasegawa). Hasegawa used the "TH airfoil" on the Ki-94.

Hasegawa's theoretical airfoil was very similar to the Supercritical airfoil theory that NASA would later develop in the 1960s. For this reason, when NASA lodged the patent application for their airfoil in Japan in 1979, their patent was not admitted to the agency.

== Toyota ==
Hasegawa lost his job after the end of World War II because Japan was prohibited to manufacture aircraft under orders of the General Headquarters (GHQ) of General Douglas MacArthur. However, in 1946, Hasegawa was employed by Toyota which was recruiting engineers at that time.

After he joined Toyota, Hasegawa was involved in the development of the Toyopet Crown as the sub-chief (fuku-Shusa) of development under his chief (Shusa), Kenya Nakamura.

During the development for the Crown, the Shusa (product manager) style of organization was introduced for the first time. It is believed that this system was developed from the Chief designer system of fighter development used during World War II.

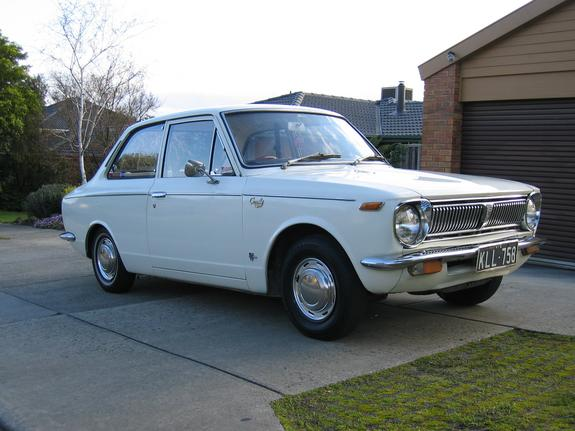
The first generation of the Toyota Corolla.

Hasegawa later led the development of the first generation models of the Toyota Publica, Sports 800, Corolla, Celica and Carina, as the chief (Shusa). He also was involved in the Toyopet SKB truck, the precursor of the Toyota Dyna

He was promoted to the general manager of the product planning office and senior director, and retired from the automobile industry in 1982.

== After Toyota ==
Hasegawa was a senior consultant to DuPont, Delaware, between 1982 and 1988, where he advised them on their marketing strategy aimed at the automobile industry. The "Detroit Development Center" may be one of his contributions.

After his work for DuPont, Hasegawa returned to Japan and concentrated on gardening with roses and cattleyas.

On November 15, 2004, he was elected as one of 2004 inductees in the Japan Automotive Hall of Fame for the application of aerodynamic theory to automobile design, and for mainstream product planning and management in corporate environment.

On April 29, 2008, Tatsuo Hasegawa died at the age of 92 in Yokohama, Kanagawa.
