= Nakajima Ki-43 Hayabusa =

Japanese WW2 fighter

Ki-43 "Hayabusa"
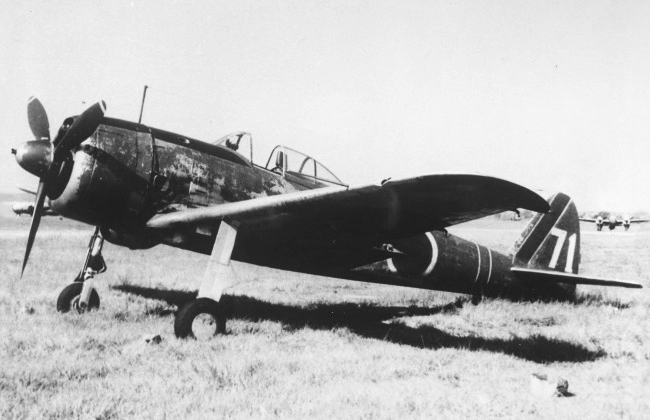

General information
- Type: Fighter aircraft
- National origin: Empire of Japan
- Manufacturer: Nakajima Aircraft Company
- Primary users: Imperial Japanese Army Air Service: Royal Thai Air Force; Manchukuo Air Force; Indonesian Air Force
- Number built: 5,919

History
- Manufactured: 1939–1945
- Introduction date: October 1941
- First flight: Early January 1939
- Retired: 1945 (Japan); 1952 (China)

The Nakajima Ki-43 Hayabusa (隼, Peregrine falcon), formal Japanese designation Army Type 1 Fighter (一式戦闘機, Ichi-shiki sentōki) is a single-engine land-based tactical fighter designed and produced by the Japanese manufacturer Nakajima Aircraft Company. The Allied reporting name was "Oscar", but it was often called the "Army Zero" by American pilots because it bore a certain resemblance to the Mitsubishi A6M Zero, the Imperial Japanese Navy's counterpart to the Ki-43. (Note: Both the Ki-43 and A6M Zero shared generally similar layout and lines, and also used essentially the same Nakajima Sakae radial engine, with similar round cowlings and Bubble canopy (the Ki-43 being distinctly smaller and having much less framing than the A6M). While relatively easy for a trained eye to tell apart with the "finer" lines of the Ki-43's fuselage – especially towards the tail – and more tapered wing planform, in the heat of battle, given the brief glimpses and distraction of combat, Allied aviators frequently made mistakes in enemy aircraft identification, reportedly having fought "Zeros" in areas where there were no Navy fighters.) It was the Imperial Japanese Army Air Service's (IJAAS) first all-metal enclosed cockpit aircraft with retractable landing gear.

Development began in December 1937, headed by the aeronautical engineer Hideo Itokawa, as a successor to the preceding Nakajima Ki-27 monoplane fighter. Twelve months later, the first prototype was completed, performing its maiden flight in January 1939. While satisfying the performance requirements of the IJAAS, test pilots expressed dissatisfaction over the limited improvements over the Ki-27. In response, Nakajima enacted a weight reduction programme, slimmed the fuselage, redesigned both the tail unit and canopy, and adopted Fowler flaps (which improved performance during tight turns). In response to these improvements, the company was instructed to proceed with quantity production in November 1939. Beyond the initial production model, designated Ki-43-I, further development of the aircraft proceeded, resulting in the more powerful Ki-43-II (entered service in December 1942) and the Ki-43-III (entered service in summer 1944).

The Ki-43 was first introduced to service by the IJAAS in October 1941, just prior to Japan's entry into World War II. It would serve on every front that the IJAAS engaged in. Akin to the Zero, the radial-engined Ki-43 was light and relatively easy to fly, attributes that helped the aircraft become legendary for its combat performance across East Asia in the early years of the conflict. The Ki-43 could reportedly outmaneuver any opponent, but did not initially have armor or self-sealing fuel tanks, and its armament was relatively poor until its final version, which was produced as late as 1945. Allied pilots often reported that the nimble Ki-43s were difficult targets but burned easily or broke apart with a few hits. Total production amounted to 5,919 aircraft, making it the second-most produced Japanese fighter aircraft during the war after the Mitsubishi A6M Zero. Many of these were used during the last months of the conflict to conduct kamikaze missions against the American fleet. After the conflict, abandoned Ki-43s were used by numerous other services, including the French Air Force and the newly formed Indonesian Air Force.

== Design and development ==
The origins of the Ki-43 can be traced back to December 1937 and the issuing of an instruction by the Imperial Japanese Army (IJA) to the Nakajima Aircraft Company to design a new single-seat fighter to replace the Nakajima Ki-27 'Nate' monoplane fighter. While the Ki-27 had been a major step forwards over its regional rivals, it was hoped that the development of a more advanced fighter could surpass even Western fighter aircraft of the era. Accordingly, the specification was atypically stringent, calling for a maximum speed of 500 km/h (310 mph), a climb rate of 5,000 m (16,000 ft) in five minutes and a range of 800 km (500 mi). Manoeuvrability was to be at least as equal to that of the preceding Ki-27, which was a fairly agile aircraft for the era. Political factors favoured Nakajima for the contract, partially due to the company's track record with the Ki-27. In response, Nakajima assembled a design team headed by the aeronautical engineer Hideo Itokawa, who would subsequently distinguish himself as a pioneer of Japanese rocketry. Within twelve months, an initial prototype of the new design had been completed.

Rolled out in secret and first flown in early January 1939, the first Ki-43 prototype was promptly joined by two additional prototypes over the following two months. Initial manufacturer's trials proceeded with only minor problems identified prior to the prototypes being delivered to the Imperial Japanese Army Air Service (IJAAS) to conduct service trials. Although this round of testing proved that the Ki-43 fulfilled the specified performance requirements, the test pilots criticised the retractable landing gear as an unnecessary luxury as well as that the aircraft was less manoeuvrable than the Ki-27 while not being much faster. Amid these expressions of dissatisfaction, there was genuine doubts over the future of the Ki-43, to the extent that Nakajima exacted work on a refined version of the Ki-27, referred to as the Ki-27 KAI, as a potential fall-back option. While two prototypes were built and demonstrated a reduced wing loading along with a higher top speed, this work was discontinued as the Ki-43 programme proceeded.

To address the raised concerns over the Ki-43, Nakajima produced a series of progressively modified prototypes through 1939 and 1940. The aircraft was subject to a major weight saving program, adopted a slimmer fuselage, a new canopy was fitted, and the tail surfaces were repositioned further aft. Perhaps most significantly, the 11th prototype was outfitted with the unique differential "butterfly" maneuvering Fowler flaps, which dramatically improved performance in tight turns and thus was received positively by test pilots. The 13th prototype combined all these changes and tests of this aircraft was met with an instruction for Nakajima to place the Ki-43 into production while the Ki-27 jigs were transferred to the Mansyu factory at Harbin in Japanese occupied Manchukuo.

Initial production of the Ki-43 was enacted in November 1939, early-built examples were given the designation Ki-43-I. Deliveries from Nakajima's Ota factory commenced in February 1941. In addition to outstanding maneuverability, the Ki-43-I had an impressive rate of climb due to its light weight. Power was provided by the Nakajima Ha-25 engine turning a two-bladed, two-position variable-pitch metal propeller. Top speed was 495 km/h (308 mph) at 4,000 m (13,000 ft). The Ki-43 was equipped with two synchronized cowling machine guns in various configurations, with either two 7.7 mm (0.303 in) Type 89 machine guns, one 12.7 mm (0.50 in) Ho-103 machine gun and one 7.7 mm (0.303 in) gun, or two 12.7 mm (0.50 in) Ho-103 guns; the aircraft was given various sub-designations to reflect these differences. The configuration that appears to have been most prevalent at the outset of the war was the first configuration with two 7.7 mm (0.303 in) Type 89 machine guns, while as the conflict progressed the heavier combinations gained popularity and the version with the heaviest armament was sometimes given the designation Ki-43-Ic. The Ho-103 was often loaded with explosive ammunition to increase target effect; its penetrative effect against later Allied aircraft armor appears to have been marginal.

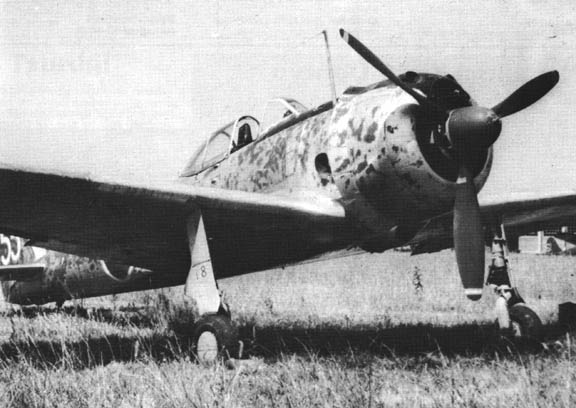
A Ki-43-II.

Prototypes for the Ki-43-II flew in February 1942. The Ha-25 engine was upgraded with the two-stage supercharger, thus becoming the more powerful Nakajima Ha-115 engine, which was installed in a longer-chord cowling. The new engine turned a three-bladed propeller. The wing structure, which had suffered failures in the Ki-43-I, was strengthened and equipped with racks for drop tanks or bombs. The Ki-43-II was also fitted with a 13 mm (0.51 in) armor plate for the pilot's head and back, and the aircraft's fuel tanks were coated in rubber to form a crude self-sealing tank. This was later replaced by a three-layer rubber bladder, 8 mm core construction; with 2 mm oil-proof lamination. This bladder proved to be highly resistant against 7.7 mm (0.303 in) bullets, but was not as effective against larger calibers. The pilot also enjoyed a slightly taller canopy and a reflector gunsight in place of the earlier telescopic gunsight. Nakajima commenced production of the Ki-43-II at its Ota factory in November 1942. Production was also started at the Tachikawa Aircraft Company Ltd (Tachikawa Hikoki KK) and the 1st Army Air Arsenal (Tachikawa Dai-Ichi Rikugun Kokusho), also at Tachikawa. Although Tachikawa Hikoki managed to begin mass production of the Ki-43, the 1st Army Air Arsenal was less successful – hampered by a shortage of skilled workers, it was ordered to stop production after 49 Ki-43s were built. Nakajima eventually ceased production in mid-1944 in favor of the Ki-84 Hayate, but the Tachikawa Hikoki continued to produce the Ki-43.

Tachikawa also produced the Ki-43-III, which used the more powerful Nakajima Army Type 1 Ha-115-II engine and increased its maximum speed to 576 km/h (358 mph). Tachikawa produced 2,124 Ki-43-II and -III aircraft between April 1944 and the end of the conflict. Total production of all versions amounted to 5,919 aircraft.

== Operational history ==
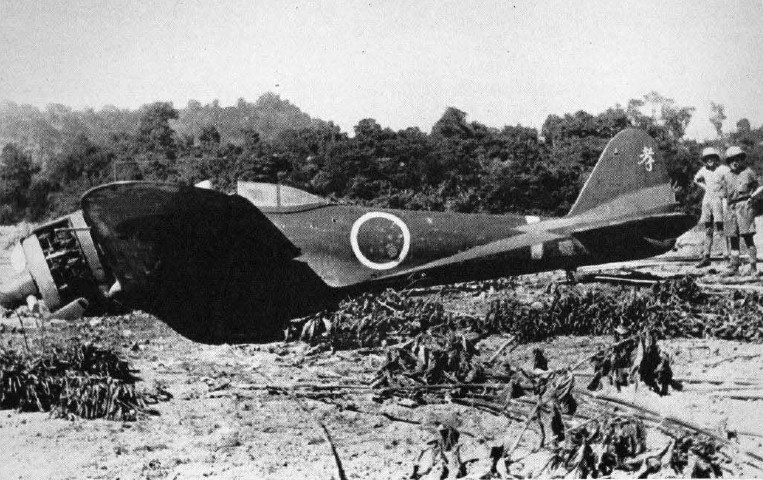
A downed Ki-43 of the 50th Sentai

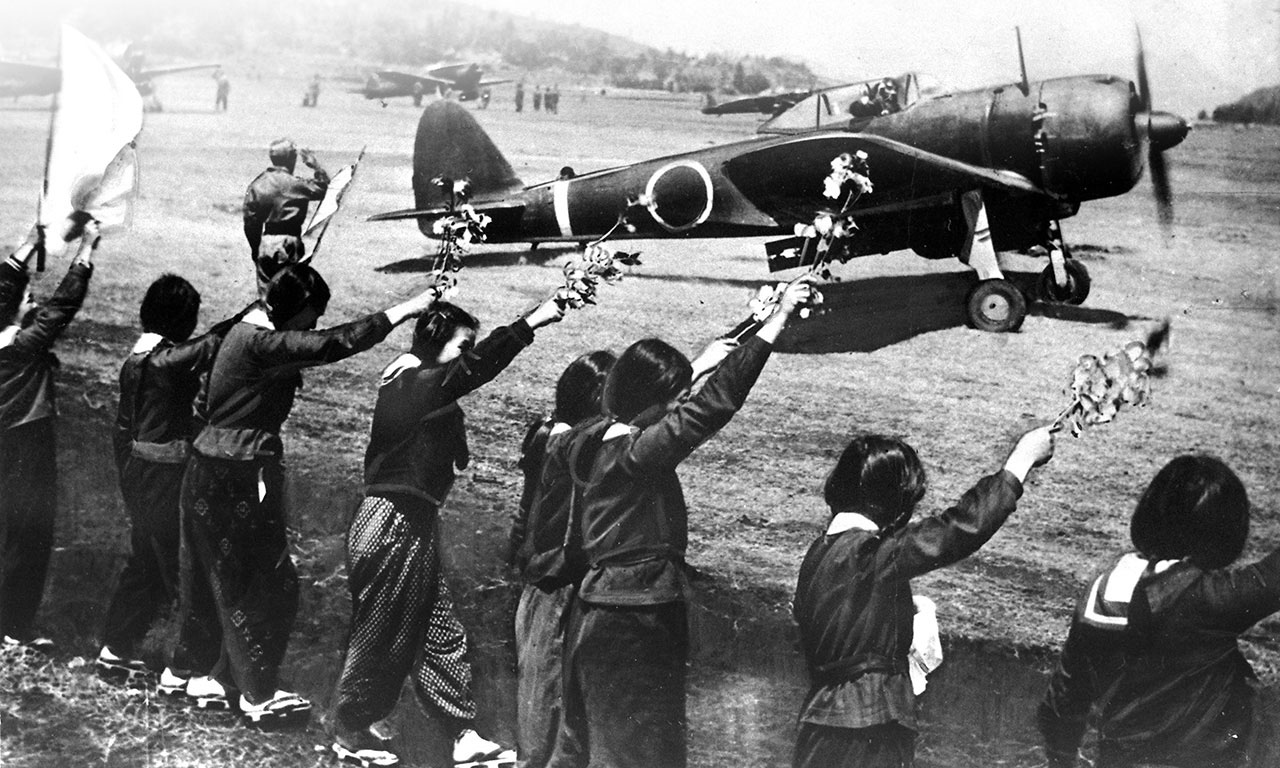
Schoolgirls wave goodbye to a Ki-43 IIIa, loaded with a 250 kg (550 lb) bomb, on a kamikaze mission, 12 April 1945.

The Ki-43 was the most widely used Army fighter, and equipped 30 sentai FR (flight regiment) (Note: Usually about 40 aircraft in total, formed into three chutai and an HQ section) and 12 Dokuritsu Dai Shijugo Chutai ("Direct command fighter squadron" - independent squadrons not incorporated into sentais) (Note: Each Chutai was formed from four flights of three aircraft). The first unit equipped with the Ki 43-I was the 59th FR at Hankow Airfield, during June–August 1941 and began operational sorties over Hengyang on 29 October 1941. The second unit to re-equip with the new Aircraft was the 64th FR, from August to November 1941.

The first version, Ki-43-I, entered service in 1941, the Ki-43-II in December 1942, the Ki-43-II-Kai in June 1943, and the Ki-43-IIIa in summer 1944. The aircraft fought in China, Burma, the Malay Peninsula, New Guinea, the Philippines, South Pacific islands and the Japanese home islands. As such, the Ki-43 would see action on every front that the IJAAS would be active on during the conflict.

In September 1943, the allies assembled a Ki-43-II-Ko in Brisbane from parts gathered from wrecked examples found at Lae, New Guinea. This allowed comparative tests against Allied types.

Like the Zero, the Ki-43 initially enjoyed air superiority in the skies of Malaya, Dutch East Indies, Burma and New Guinea. This was partly due to the better performance of the Oscar, and partly due to the relatively small numbers of combat-ready Allied fighters, mostly the Curtiss P-36 Hawk, Curtiss P-40, Brewster Buffalo, Hawker Hurricane and Curtiss-Wright CW-21 in Asia and the Pacific during the first months of the war. As the war progressed, however, the fighter suffered from the same weaknesses as the slower, fixed-gear Ki-27 "Nate" predecessor to the Oscar, and the more advanced naval A6M Zero: light armor and less-than-effective self-sealing fuel tanks, which caused high casualties in combat. Its armament of two machine guns also proved inadequate against the more heavily armored Allied aircraft. As newer Allied aircraft were introduced, such as the Republic P-47 Thunderbolt, Lockheed P-38 Lightning, North American P-51 Mustang, Vought F4U Corsair, Grumman F6F Hellcat, Yakovlev Yak-9, Yakovlev Yak-3U and late-model Supermarine Spitfire/Seafire, the Japanese were forced into a defensive war and most aircraft were flown by inexperienced pilots. However, even near the end, the Oscar's excellent maneuverability could still gain advantage over rash Allied pilots.

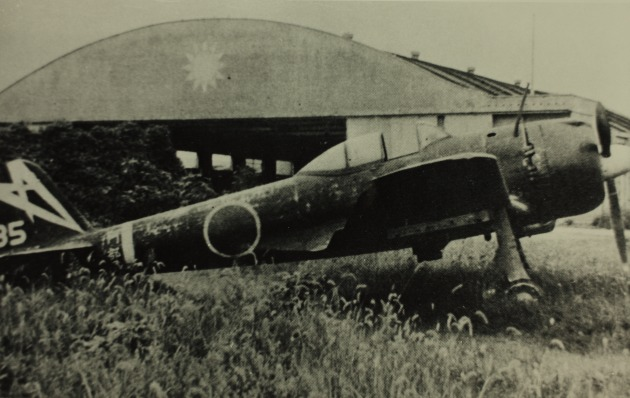
A captured Ki-43-IIIa of the 48th Sentai, postwar

Between October and December 1944, 17 Ki-43s were shot down in air combat; their pilots claimed seven C-47s, five Consolidated B-24 Liberators, two Spitfires, two Bristol Beaufighters, two de Havilland Mosquitoes, two F4U Corsairs, two Boeing B-29 Superfortresses, one F6F Hellcat, one P-38, and one North American B-25 Mitchell. Akin to most Japanese combat aircraft, hundreds of Ki-43s were expended in kamikaze missions against the advancing Allied forces in the final months of the conflict; the type was considered to be particularly effective in this capacity.

The Ki-43 also served in an air defense role over Formosa, Okinawa and the Japanese home islands. Some examples were supplied to the pro-Japanese regimes of Thailand, Manchukuo and Wang Jingwei Government as well. The Thai units sometimes fought against the United States Army Air Force (USAAF) in southern China. It was in this context that one Ki-43 became the last aircraft to be downed during WW2.

The type was typically well liked in the IJAAS because of its pleasant flight characteristics and excellent maneuverability, and almost all of the service's fighter aces claimed victories with Hayabusas in some part of their career. At the end of the war, most Ki-43 units received the newer Nakajima Ki-84 Hayate "Frank" and Kawasaki Ki-100 fighters, but some units continued to fly the Hayabusa to the end of the conflict. The top-scoring Hayabusa pilot was Sergeant Satoshi Anabuki with thirty-nine confirmed victories, almost all scored with the Ki-43.

After the war, some captured examples served in limited numbers in the French Air Force in Indochina against Viet Minh rebels.

Several Ki-43s that had been abandoned by the Japanese in the Dutch East Indies were promptly taken over by the newly declared Indonesian government and put into service during the fight against Dutch forces.

== Variants ==
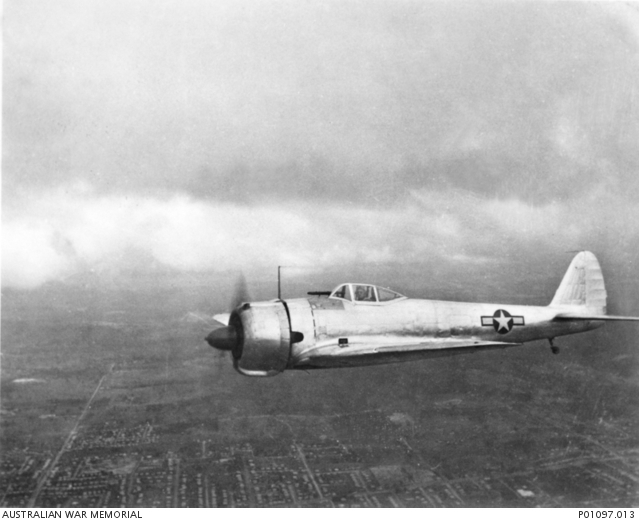
A captured Ki-43-Ib in flight over Brisbane, 1943

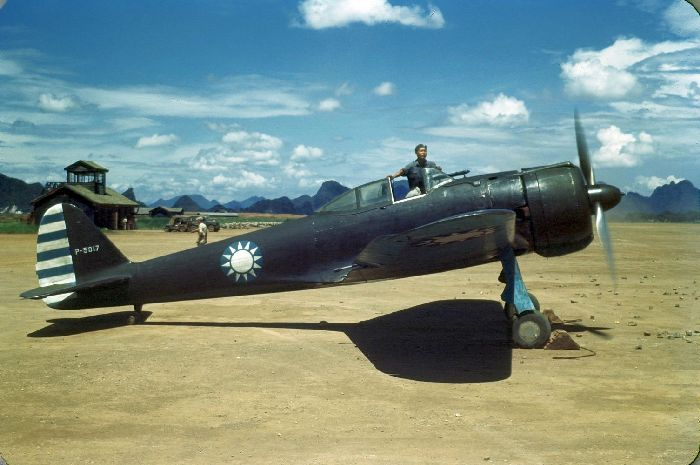
Chinese operated Ki-43-I

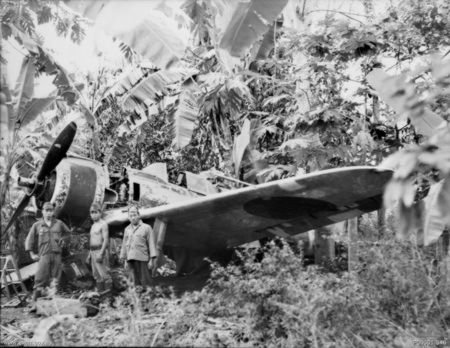
Ki-43 at Rabaul in 1945 (later restored by the Flying Heritage Collection)

Ki-43
13 Prototypes/pre-production aircraft.
Ki-43-Ia (kō; キ43-I甲)
Variant armed with 2 × 7.7 mm (0.303 in) Type 89 machine guns.
Ki-43-Ib (otsu; キ43-I乙)
Variant armed with one 12.7 mm (0.50 in) Ho-103 machine gun and 1 × 7.7 mm (0.303 in) Type 89.
Ki-43-Ic (hei, キ43-I丙)
Variant armed with 2 × 12.7 mm (0.50 in) Ho-103, plus ability to mount 2x30kg bombs under wings. All earlier Ki-43-Ia "Ko" and Ki-43-Ib "Otsu" were gradually upgraded to this version as more Ho-103 became available.
Ki-43-II (キ43-II)
5 Prototypes, introduced the Ha-115 engine with two stage supercharger, shorter and stronger wings, self-sealing fuel tanks, 13 mm (0.51 in) of pilot armor, reflector sight, three-bladed fixed pitch propeller, and an improved canopy.
Ki-43-IIa (kō; キ43-II甲)
First Ki-43-II production model. Improvements of the 5 prototypes added into the design. Ability to carry up to 500 kg (1,100 lb) of bombs.
An improved version changed the oil ring cooler to a honeycomb type mounted under the nose, and used improved landing light.
Ki-43-IIb (otsu; キ43-II乙)
Fuel cooling system added on some examples. Both exhaust pipes were angled backwards for slightly increased thrust. Universal drop tank racks mounted outboard of landing gear on later examples. (earlier models sometimes had mounting points slightly inboard of the landing gear or on the centerline)
Ki-43-II-Kai (kai; キ43-II改)
Later examples could carry bombs on the drop tank mountings. This variant was tested with skis for operations from snow in Manchuria. Fitted with ejector exhaust stacks (adding approximately 30 hp) and additional 540-litre (140 US gal; 120 imp gal) fuel tank in fuselage.
Ki-43-III (キ43-III)
Prototypes powered by Nakajima Ha-115-II engine of 920 kW (1,230 hp) Exhaust stack configuration slightly modified. Water-methanol injection added.
Ki-43-IIIa (kō; キ43-III甲)
Only produced by Tachikawa plant.
Series production model, some fitted with skis for operations from snow.
Ki-43-IIIb (otsu; キ43-III乙)
Variant with the Mitsubishi Ha-112-II radial engine and armed with twin 20 mm (0.79 in) Ho-5 cannon. (Prototype – only 2 Built)
Ki-43-IV (キ43-IV)
Project to implement a better powerplant system, never adopted.
Ki-62 (キ62)
Advanced interceptor proposed version of Nakajima Ki-43 with a more-powerful engine and armed with 30 mm (1.18 in) or 40 mm (1.57 in) cannons, none built
B.Kh.13
(Thai: บ.ข.๑๓) Royal Thai Air Force designation for the Ki-43-II.

== Production ==
Ki-43 Production: Ota, Nakajima Aircraft Company
Year
| Year | Jan. | Feb. | Mar. | Apr. | May | June | July | Aug. | Sept. | Oct. | Nov. | Dec. | Annual |
|---|---|---|---|---|---|---|---|---|---|---|---|---|---|
| 1941 | | | | 3 | 9 | 23 | 5 | 20 | 20 | 5 | 29 | 43 | 157 |
| 1942 | 40 | 26 | 47 | 61 | 51 | 57 | 61 | 37 | 56 | 55 | 46 | 79 | 616 |
| 1943 | 88 | 77 | 90 | 96 | 102 | 105 | 105 | 120 | 120 | 138 | 140 | 147 | 1,347 |
| 1944 | 179 | 181 | 167 | 140 | 155 | 125 | 84 | 28 | 11 | | | | 1,070 |
| Total | | | | | | | | | | | | | 3,190 |

Not included:

- Ki-43-I's pre-production started with three prototypes completed in December 1938, as well as in February and March 1940. A further ten service trials aircraft were built from November 1939 to September 1940.
- Ki-43-II's pre-production started with five prototypes completed during February to May 1942. A further three service trials aircraft were built from June to August 1942.
- Ki-43-III's pre-production started with ten prototypes completed during May 1944 to August 1945.

Ki-43 Production: Tachikawa, Tachikawa Aircraft Company Ltd
Year
| Year | Jan. | Feb. | Mar. | Apr. | May | June | July | Aug. | Sept. | Oct. | Nov. | Dec. | Annual |
|---|---|---|---|---|---|---|---|---|---|---|---|---|---|
| 1943 | | | | | 5 | 7 | 10 | 15 | 20 | 30 | 45 | 67 | 199 |
| 1944 | 10 | 115 | 100 | 140 | 125 | 147 | 148 | 157 | 210 | 75 | 275 | 180 | 1682 |
| 1945 | 105 | 90 | 155 | 70 | 120 | 93 | 80 | 35 | | | | | 748 |
| Total | | | | | | | | | | | | | 2629 |

A further 49 Ki-43-II's were assembled from October 1943 to November 1944 at Tachikawa Dai-Ichi Rikugun Kokusho arsenal plant.

Total Production:
| According to USSBS Report | 5,819 | 5,819 Ki-43-I, Ki-43-II and Ki-43-IIIa builds |
| According to Francillon | 5,919 | 729 Ki-43-I, 5,188 Ki-43-II and Ki-43-IIIa builds, 2 Ki-43-IIIb prototypes |

The number of Ki-43s actually delivered and accepted by August 1945 was 5,751; 3185 from Nakajima, 22 from Rikugun, and 2544 from Tachikawa.

== Operators ==
=== Wartime ===
Empire of Japan

- Imperial Japanese Army Air Force

Manchukuo

- Manchukuo Air Force

Thailand

- Royal Thai Air Force Operates 24 Ki-43 IIB aircraft.

=== Postwar ===
China

- Nationalist Chinese Air Force, 6th Group, two squadrons operated captured aircraft.

China

- Chinese Communist Air Force operated five aircraft captured from nationalists from 1946 until 1952.

France

- French Air Force Escadron de Chasse 1/7 operated captured aircraft in 1945–1946 Indo-China.

Indonesia

- Indonesian Air Force repaired derelict aircraft to fight Dutch colonial rule. In 1947, the Ki-43 currently at the Museum Dirgantara Udara Yogyakarta near Adisucipto International Airport was to bomb Dutch strategic positions however mechanical problems grounded it.

North Korea

- North Korean Air Force operated repaired derelict aircraft after the war.

== Surviving aircraft ==
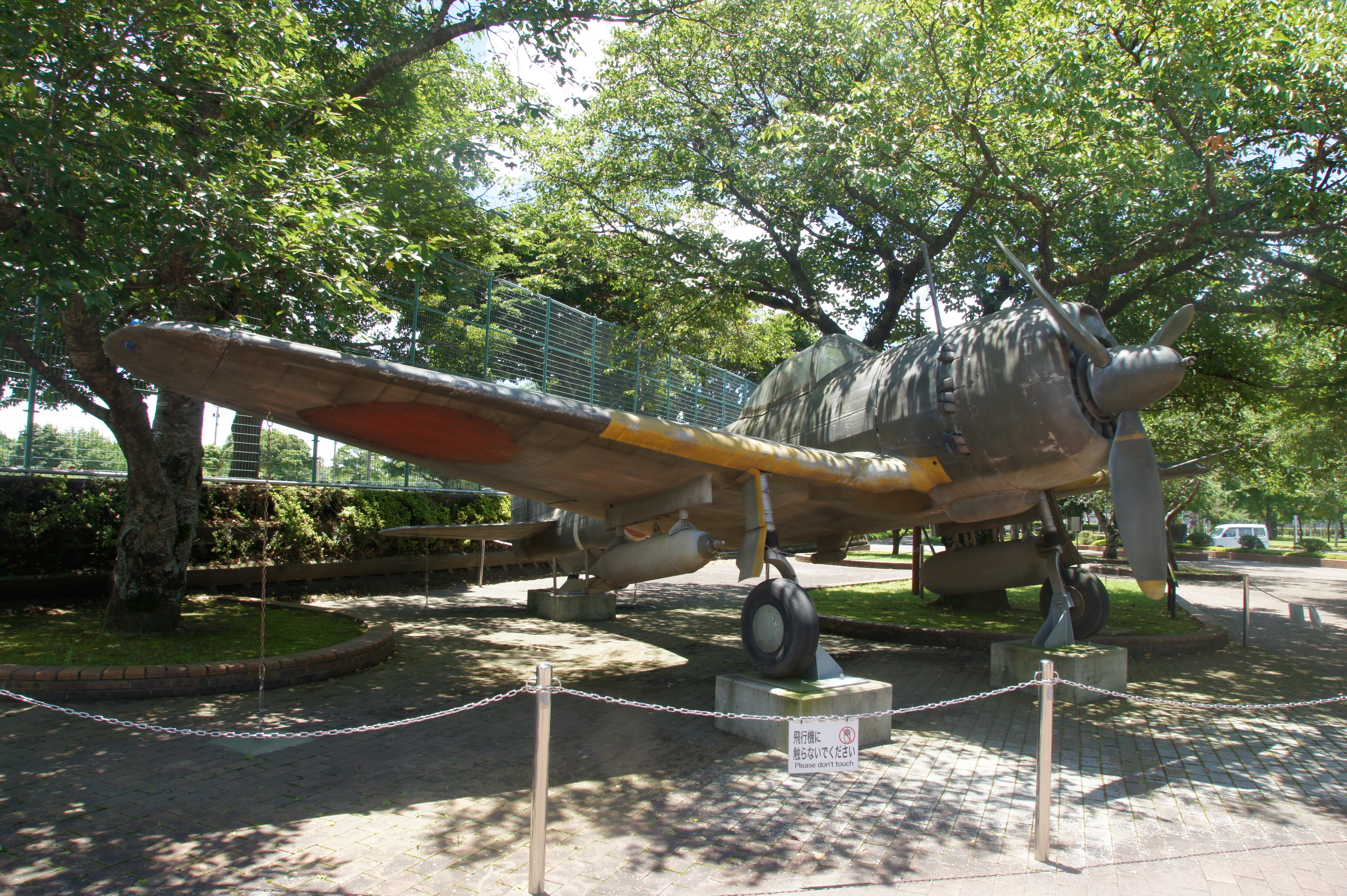
Ki-43 Hayabusa display outside Chiran Peace Museum for Kamikaze Pilots, Minamikyūshū, Kagoshima, Japan

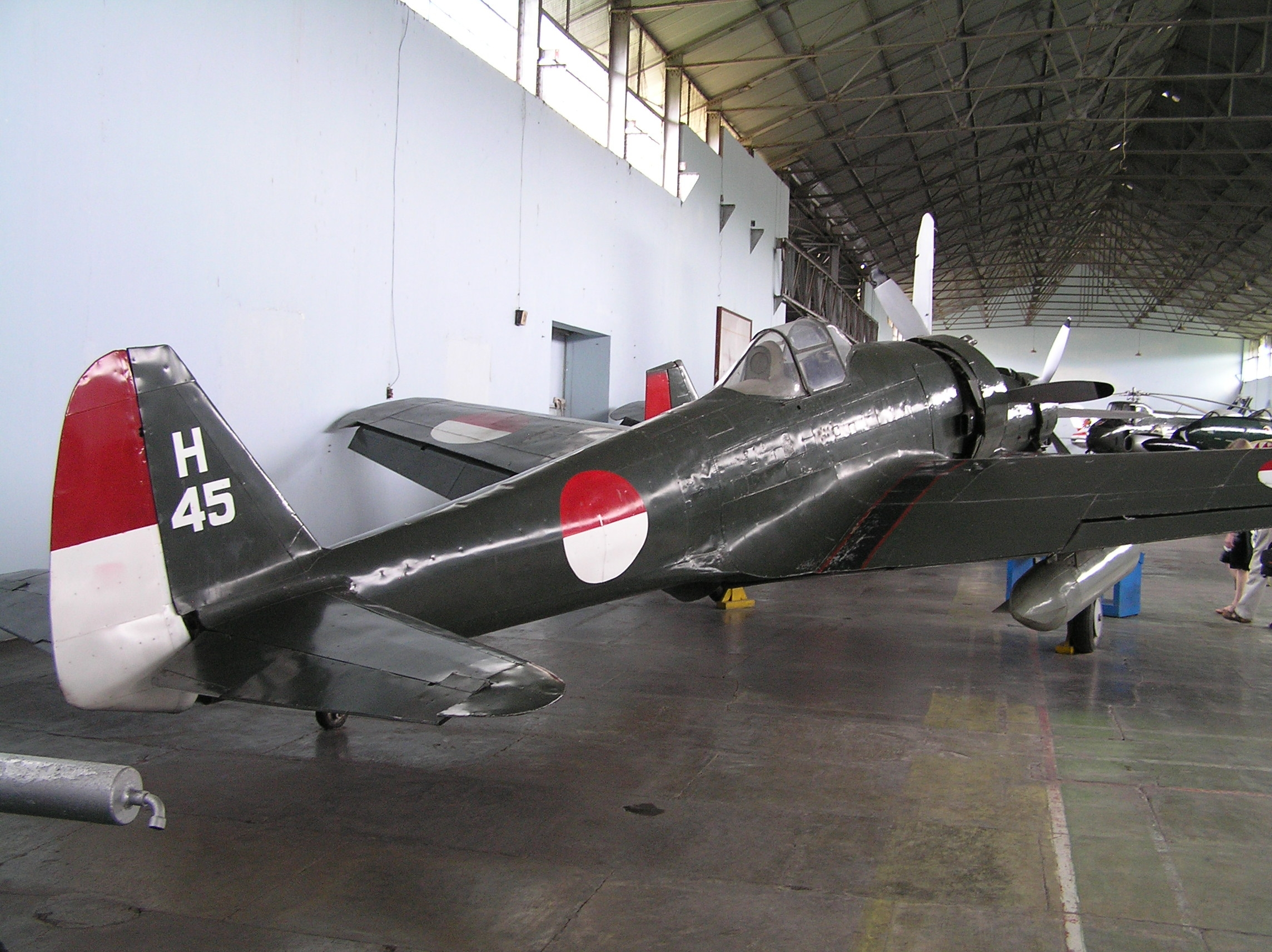
Indonesian Ki-43-II

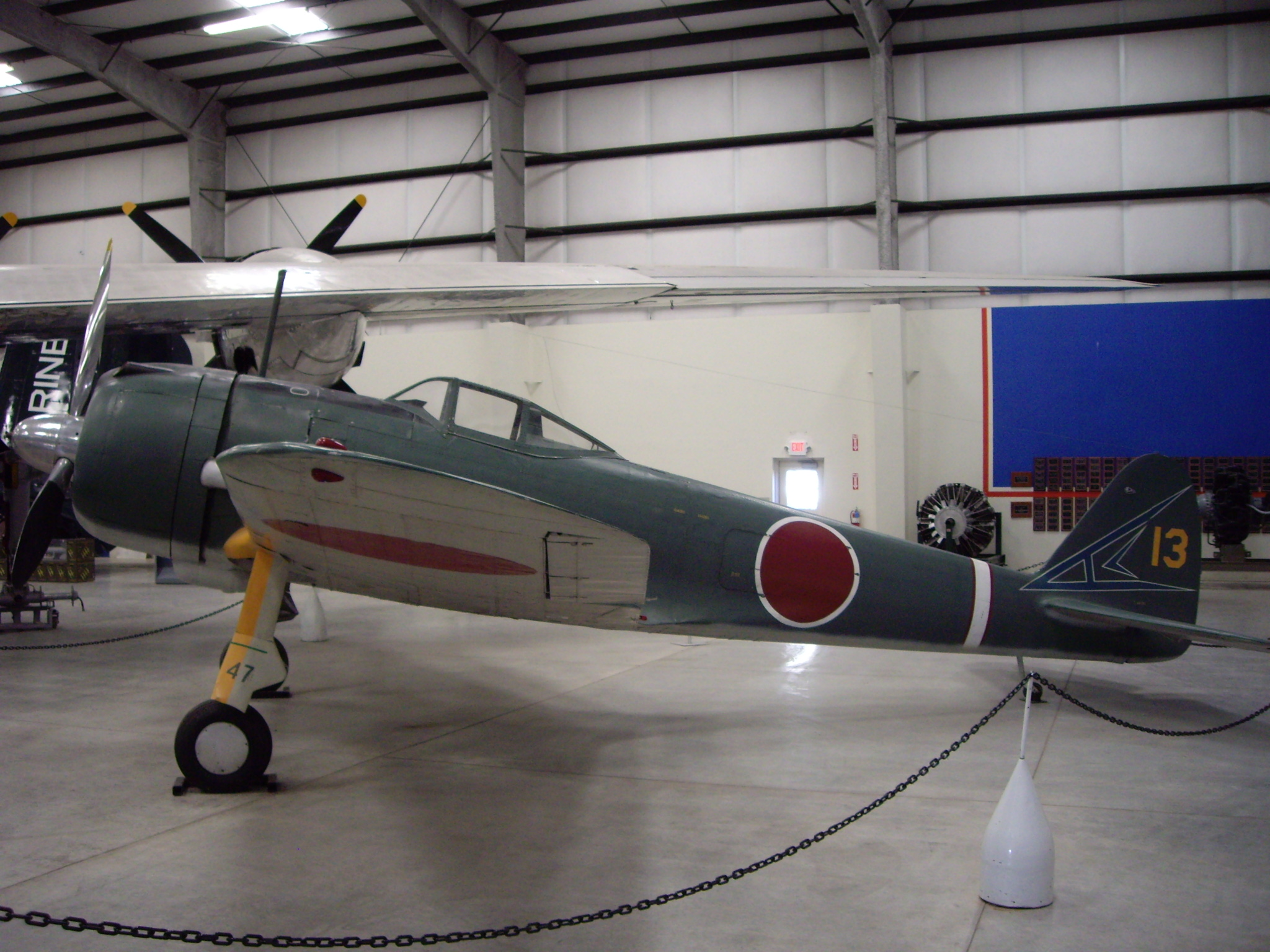
Ki-43 at the Pima Air and Space Museum

- 750 – Ki-43-I on display at Flying Heritage Collection in Everett, Washington. Former ZK-OSC restored to flying condition by the Alpine Fighter Collection in the 1990s, not currently flying.
- 5465 – Ki-43-II displayed unrestored at the Australian War Museum in Canberra, Australian Capital Territory. The nose and tail are in the main museum building, while the wings and center section are in storage.
- 6430 – Ki-43-IIb on display at the Pima Air & Space Museum in Tucson, Arizona. This aircraft was previously on display at the EAA AirVenture Museum and the Museum of Flight and is on loan from the National Air and Space Museum.
- Reproduction – Ki-43-IIIa on display at the Museum of Flight in Seattle, Washington. This aircraft contains parts from four different wrecks. The restoration was begun by the Texas Airplane Factory and completed by GossHawk Unlimited.
- Reproduction – Ki-43-IIIa at the Erickson Aircraft Collection in Madras, Oregon. This aircraft was previously at the Tillamook Air Museum in Tillamook, Oregon.
- Reproduction – Ki-43 originally under restoration/rebuild at Texas Airplane Factory, Meacham Field, Fort Worth, Texas from 4 wrecks. Now located at GossHawk Unlimited in Casa Grande, Arizona.
- Reproduction – Ki-43 originally under restoration/rebuild at Texas Airplane Factory, Meacham Field, Fort Worth, Texas. Now located at GossHawk Unlimited in Casa Grande, Arizona.
- Reproduction – Ki-43 on display outside Chiran Peace Museum for Kamikaze Pilots, Minamikyūshū, Kagoshima, Japan.
- Unknown msn – Ki-43 awaiting restoration at The Fighter Collection in Duxford, United Kingdom. The aircraft is currently undergoing restoration by Nobuo Harada and will be placed on display at the Kawaguchiko Motor Museum when completed.
- Unknown serial number – Ki-43 on display at Dirgantara Mandala Museum in Yogyakarta.
- Unknown serial number – Ki-43 under restoration at the Kawaguchiko Motor Museum / Fighter Museum in Kawaguchiko, Yamanashi.

== Specifications (Ki-43-IIb) ==
Nakajima Ki 43-I

Data from Japanese Aircraft of the Pacific War

General characteristics

- Crew: One
- Length: 8.92 m (29 ft 3 in)
- Wingspan: 10.84 m (35 ft 7 in)
- Height: 3.27 m (10 ft 9 in)
- Wing area: 21.4 m^{2} (230 sq ft)
- Airfoil: root: NN-12 mod. (18%); tip: NN-12 mod. (8%)
- Empty weight: 1,910 kg (4,211 lb)
- Gross weight: 2,590 kg (5,710 lb)
- Max takeoff weight: 2,925 kg (6,449 lb)
- Fuel capacity: 550 L (120 imp gal) plus 2 × 200 L (53 US gal; 44 imp gal) drop tanks
- Powerplant: 1 × Nakajima Ha-115 14-cylinder air-cooled radial piston engine, 970 kW (1,300 hp) for take-off

890 kW (1,200 hp) at 3,000 m (9,800 ft)
820 kW (1,100 hp) at 6,200 m (20,300 ft)

- Propellers: 3-bladed metal constant-speed propeller, 2.79 m (9 ft 2 in) diameter

Performance

- Maximum speed: 530 km/h (330 mph, 290 kn) at 4,000 m (13,000 ft)
- Cruise speed: 440 km/h (270 mph, 240 kn)
- Range: 1,760 km (1,090 mi, 950 nmi)
- Ferry range: 3,200 km (2,000 mi, 1,700 nmi)
- Service ceiling: 11,200 m (36,700 ft)
- Time to altitude: 5,000 m (16,000 ft) in five minutes and 49 seconds
- Wing loading: 121 kg/m^{2} (25 lb/sq ft)
- Power/mass: 0.33 kW/kg (0.20 hp/lb)

Armament

- Guns: 2 × 12.7 mm (0.500 in) Ho-103's in the forward fuselage with 270 rpg (Note: Ki-43-Ia: 2 × 7.7 mm (0.30 in) Type 89 machine guns, Ki-43-Ib: 1 × 7.7 mm (0.30 in) Type 89 machine gun and 1x 12.7 mm (0.50 in) Ho-103, Ki-43-Ic, IIa, IIb, II Kai and IIIa: 2 × 12.7 mm (0.50 in) Ho-103, Ki-43-IIIb:2 × 20 mm (0.79 in) Ho-5 cannon)
- Bombs: 2 × 30 kg (66 lb) bombs or 2 × 250 kg (550 lb) bombs (Note: also on Ki-43-III, Ki-43-I: 2 × 15 kg (33 lb) bombs)

== See also ==
Related development

- Nakajima Ki-27
- Nakajima Ki-44
- Nakajima Ki-84

Aircraft of comparable role, configuration, and era

- Bloch MB.152
- Curtiss P-36 Hawk
- Curtiss-Wright CW-21
- Grumman F4F Wildcat
- IAR 80
- Macchi MC.200
- Mitsubishi A6M Zero
- Polikarpov I-180
- PZL.50
- Reggiane Re.2000
- Vultee P-66 Vanguard
- Weiss Manfréd WM-23 Ezüst Nyíl

Related lists

- List of aircraft of Japan during World War II
- List of aircraft of World War II
- List of military aircraft of Japan
