= Nakajima Ki-116 =

Japanese fighter

Ki-116

General information
- Type: Single seat fighter
- Manufacturer: Manshūkoku Hikōki Seizo KK
- Primary user: Imperial Japanese Army Air Force
- Number built: 1

History
- First flight: 1945
- Variant: Nakajima Ki-84

The Nakajima Ki-116 was a late–World War II aircraft developed for the Imperial Japanese Army Air Force. It was essentially a Ki-84 Hayate with the Nakajima Ha-45 engine replaced with a Mitsubishi Ha-112. The design was handled by Mansyū Aircraft in Manchukuo, and thus it is often designated Mansyū Ki-116.

== Design and development ==
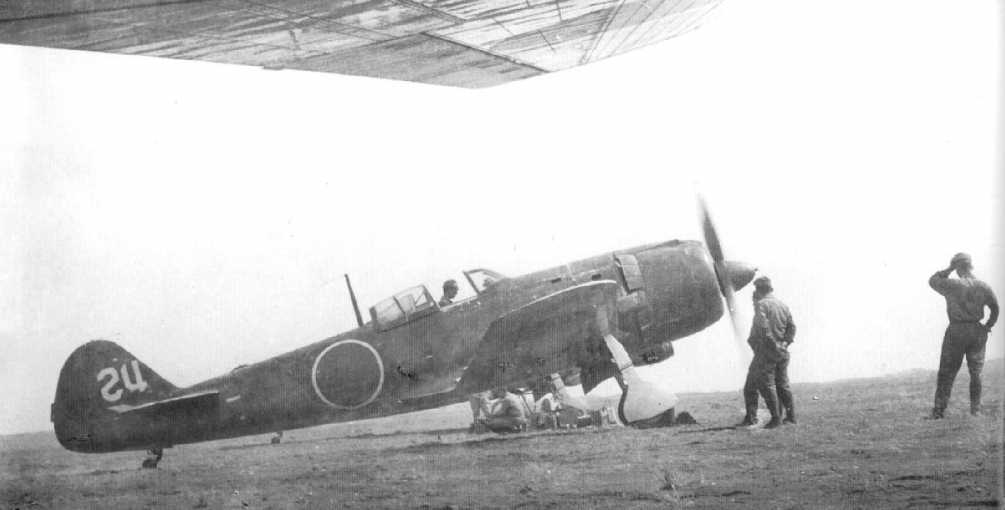
This photo shows a Ki-84, the base of the Ki-116.

The Ki-116 was the last variant of the Nakajima Ki-84 Hayate to enter flight trials. It was originally the fourth Mansyu-built Ki-84-I, adapted to take a 1,100 kW (1,500 hp) Mitsubishi Ha-112-II (aka Kinsei 62) engine, the same engine used in the Kawasaki Ki-100, driving a three-blade propeller borrowed from a Mitsubishi Ki-46-III Dinah. This conversion proved to be very successful, a reduction of 450 kg (1,000 lb) in empty weight being registered. The aircraft was still undergoing tests at the time of Japan's defeat. It appeared somewhat longer and had an increased tail surface area compared to the original Ki-84.

This aircraft was created as a fighter-interceptor. There is no indication that it was intended for the Special Attack suicide role (shimbu-tai).

One aircraft was built at Manshūkoku Hikōki Seizo KK at their plant in Harbin in 1945.

== Specifications ==
General Characteristics

- Crew: one
- Length: 9.93 m (32 ft 7 in)
- Wingspan: 11.23 m (36 ft 11 in)
- Height: 3.38 m (11 ft 1 in)
- Wing Area: 21 m^{2} (226 ft²)
- Empty Weight: 2,240 kg (4,938lb)
- Loaded Weight: 3,192 kg (7,039lb)
- Powerplant:1 Mitsubishi Ha-112-11
- Speed : 730 km/h (450 mph)
- Armament: 2 × 20 mm Ho-5 cannons in wings and 2 × 12.7 mm Ho-103 machine guns in upper fuselage

== See also ==
Related development

- Nakajima Ki-84

Aircraft of comparable role, configuration, and era

- Focke-Wulf Ta 152C
- Hawker Sea Fury

Related lists

- List of aircraft of Japan during World War II
- List of military aircraft of Japan
