= Satoru Anabuki =

Japanese air force soldier (born 1921)

- 穴吹 智
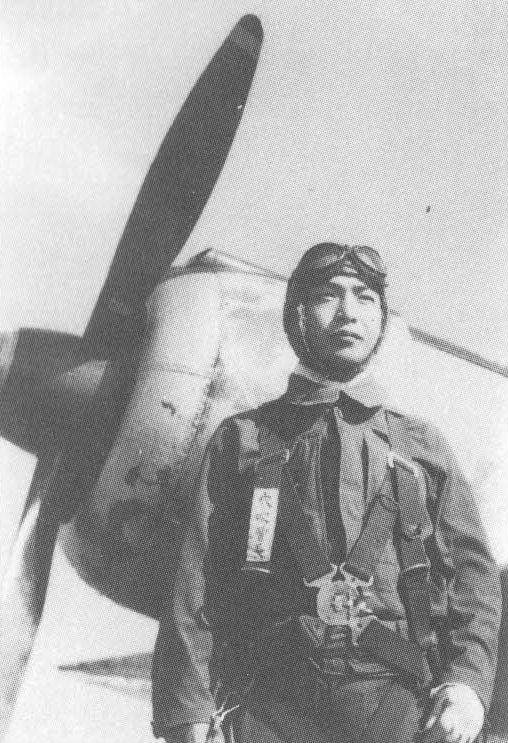
- Satoru Anabuki poses in front of a Nakajima Ki-43 aircraft in late 1944.
- Born: 5 December 1921; Yamada
- Died: June 2005 (aged 83)
- Military career
- Allegiance: Empire of Japan; Japan
- Branch: Imperial Japanese Army Air Service; Japan Ground Self-Defense Force
- Service years: IJA: 1941—1945; JGSDF: 1954-1971
- Rank: Sergeant major (IJA); Lieutenant colonel (JGSDF)
- Nicknames: "Flower of the Youth Flyers" "Momotarō in Burma"
- Units: 3rd Chutai, 50th Sentai; Akeno Army Flying School (Akeno Rikugun Hikō Gakkō)
- Conflicts: World War II

Lieutenant Colonel Satoru Anabuki (穴吹 智, Anabuki Satoru; December 5, 1921 – June 2005, sometimes Satoshi) was, depending on the source, the second or third highest-scoring flying ace of the Imperial Japanese Army Air Force in World War II, with 39 victories (51 claimed). There are 53 claimed victories to be found in his autobiography Soku no Kawa (see below), where his first triple kill (nos. 10-12) was mis-counted as just one (next kill was noted as no. 11).

== Imperial Japanese Army Air Force career ==
Born into a farming family in the Kagawa Prefecture, he graduated high school to take the entrance examination for the Juvenile Flying Soldier School and entered the Tokyo Army Aviation School in April 1938, graduating in March 1941 in the 6th Juvenile Soldier Course and receiving a promotion to corporal in October. He was assigned to the 3rd Company of the 50th Air Squadron, stationed on Formosa in 1941.

With the outbreak of the Pacific War, he fought in the conquest of the Philippines, where he claimed his first victory, a Curtiss P-40, on December 22, 1941. On February 9, 1942, he shot down two more.

Soon after, his unit returned to Japan to exchange their Nakajima Ki-27 "Nates" for more advanced Ki-43 "Hayabusas" (allied code name "Oscar"). The 50th Air Squadron was then sent to Burma in June 1942. He was promoted to sergeant in December. On 24 January 1943, he shot down his first heavily armed B-24 bomber. He claimed to have shot down three B-24s and one P-38 fighter escort in a single engagement on 8 October 1943, but this has been disputed. The third B-24 claimed was reported rammed by him causing great damage to his aircraft in which he crash landed on the shoreline to be rescued three days later. In recognition of this achievement he was awarded an individual citation - at that time unprecedented for a pilot who was still alive.

In 1944, he was reassigned to Japan to be a flight instructor at the Akeno Army Flying School. He flew in the defense of the home islands. In December 1944, he was promoted to sergeant major and returned to action over the Philippines, where he claimed at least four F6F Hellcats shot down flying the Ki-84 "Hayate". Anabuki scored his last victory over Japan, a B-29.

== Postwar ==
After the war in 1950, he enlisted in the National Police Reserve before joining the Japan Self-Defense Forces when it was founded in 1954. He served as a pilot flying Ground Self-Defense Force helicopters and retired as a lieutenant colonel in 1971, subsequently joining Japan Airlines and retiring in 1984.

Victory claims of Satoru Anubiki, data from
Kill	Date	Flying	Victim	Comments
1	1941-12-22	Ki-27	P-40	Lingayen, Philippines
2	-	Ki-27	unknown	unknown
3	1942-02-09	Ki-27	P-40	Bataan, Philippines
4	1942-10-25	Ki-43	P-40	Chinskia?, India (modern Bangladesh)
5	1942-12-10	Ki-43	Hurricane	Chittagong, India
-	1942-12-15	Ki-43	Hurricane	Chittagong, India (probable)
6	1942-12-20	Ki-43	Hurricane	Magwe, Burma
7	1942-12-20	Ki-43	Blenheim	Magwe, Burma (injured)
8	1942-12-23	Ki-43	unknown	Fenny, Burma ?
9	1942-12-23	Ki-43	Blenheim	Magwe, Burma (Night kill )
10-12	1942-12-24	Ki-43	3 Hurricanes	Magwe, Burma
13	1942-12-30	Ki-43	Blenheim	Meiktila, Burma
14	1943-01-14	Ki-43	Hurricane	Inden?, India (modern Bangladesh)
15	1943-01-16	Ki-43	P-40	Yunnan, China
16	1943-01-17	Ki-43	Hurricane	Fenny, Burma ?
17-18	1943-01-19	Ki-43	2 Hurricanes	Akyab, Burma
19	1943-01-24	Ki-43	Wellington	Rangoon, Burma
20	1943-01-26	Ki-43	B-24	Mingaladon, Burma (first B-24 daylight kill)
21	1943-01-30	Ki-43	B-25	Toungoo, Burma
22	1943-02-28	Ki-43	Blenheim	Akyab, Burma
23	1943-02-28	Ki-43	Hurricane	Akyab, Burma
-	1943-03-02	Ki-43	Hurricane	Fenny, Burma ? (probable)
24	1943-03-24	Ki-43	B-25	Meiktila, Burma
-	1943-03-29	Ki-43	Hurricane	Mindon, Burma (probable)
25-26	1943-03-30	Ki-43	2 Hurricanes	Mindon, Burma
27-29	1943-03-31	Ki-43	3 Hurricanes	Patenga, India
30-31	1943-04-04	Ki-43	2 Hurricanes	Dohazari, India
-	1943-04-20	Ki-43	Hurricane	Imphal, India (probable)
32	1943-04-20	Ki-43	P-36	Imphal, India
33-34	1943-04-21	Ki-43	2 P-36s	Imphal, India
35	1943-04-28	Ki-43	P-40	Kunming, China
36	1943-05-04	Ki-43	Hurricane	Cox's Bazar, India
37-40	1943-05-15	Ki-43	4 P-40s	Kunming, China
41-42	1943-05-22	Ki-43	2 Hurricanes	Chittagong, India
43-44	1943-05-29	Ki-43	1 Hurricane; 1 Spitfire?	Chittagong, India; Ki-43 "Fubuki" retired of service with 230 hours of flying
45-48	1943-10-08	Ki-43	1 P-38, 3 B-24s	Rangoon, Burma (heavily injured) flying Ki-43 "Kimikaze"
49-52	unknown	Ki-84	4 Hellcats	Philippines (In separated sorties)
53	unknown	Ki-100	B-29	Honshu, Japan

Many of Anabuki's victory claims during the Burma Campaign have been contested by comparing them to Allied records of lost aircraft on particular occasions. In several cases, there were no records of Allied planes even operating in the area where the claims were made.
