= Mansyū Ki-98 =

Japanese ground-attack aircraft

Ki-98

General information
- Type: Ground-attack aircraft
- National origin: Japan
- Manufacturer: Manchuria Airplane Manufacturing Company
- Primary user: Imperial Japanese Army Air Force (intended)
- Number built: 1 (destroyed before completion)

The Mansyū Ki-98 (also written as Manshū Ki-98), was a Japanese ground-attack aircraft proposed by Mansyū (Manshūkoku Hikōki K.K. - Manchuria Airplane Manufacturing Company Ltd.) during World War II for use by the Imperial Japanese Army Air Force. The still unassembled components of the first prototype were deliberately destroyed before Japan surrendered.

== Design and development ==
By late 1942, the Imperial Japanese Army Air Force issued requirements for new combat aircraft, including a ground attack aircraft. Kawasaki proposed the Kawasaki Ki-102 and Mansyū the Ki-98. The Ki-98 was to have been a single-seat, twin-boom, low-wing monoplane with a central nacelle housing both the cockpit and a turbosupercharged 1,643-kilowatt (2,200-hp) Mitsubishi Ha-211 Ru radial engine behind the pilot driving a four-bladed pusher propeller rotating between the booms. The underslung booms extended aft from slightly forward of the leading edge of the wing with ovoid fins supporting the tailplane and elevator between them. The aircraft had a retractable tricycle landing gear, bubble canopy, and an armament of one 37-mm and two 20-mm cannon mounted in the nose. Entry to the cockpit was to have been through a door in the nose undercarriage bay.

In the spring of 1944, the Army Air Force instructed Mansyū to adapt the design as a high-altitude fighter. The major change being the engine, substituting the turbocharged Mitsubishi Ha-211 Ru for the original Ha-211 III. The increased bulk of the new engine required the fuselage to be enlarged, and the larger diameter propeller necessitated moving the booms outboard.

Construction of the first prototype was delayed by bombing raids of China's based American B-29 on the Mukden factory on the 7 and 21 December 1944 factory until January 1945. Components for the first prototype was still under construction and hadn't been assembled when the Soviet Union invaded Manchuria in August 1945; the Manchukuo Imperial Army ordered all documentation and material to be destroyed to prevent capture by Soviet forces, bringing the Ki-98 project to an end.

== Specifications (Ki-98 estimated) ==
Data from Japanese Secret Projects:Experimental aircraft of the IJA and IJN 1939–1945

General characteristics

- Crew: 1
- Length: 11.4 m (37 ft 5 in)
- Wingspan: 11.26 m (36 ft 11 in)
- Height: 4.29 m (14 ft 1 in)
- Wing area: 23.99 m^{2} (258.2 sq ft)
- Empty weight: 3,500 kg (7,716 lb)
- Gross weight: 4,500 kg (9,921 lb)
- Powerplant: 1 × Mitsubishi Ha-211 Ru 18-cyl. fan assisted air-cooled radial engine, 1,600 kW (2,200 hp) for take-off
  - 1,461.6 kW (1,960 hp) at 2,000 m (6,562 ft)
  - 1,305 kW (1,750 hp) at 8,500 m (27,887 ft)
- Propellers: 4-bladed metal constant speed pusher propeller driven by a 2 m (7 ft) long extension shaft, 3.6 m (11 ft 10 in) diameter

Performance

- Maximum speed: 730 km/h (450 mph, 390 kn) at 10,000 m (32,808 ft)
- Range: 1,249 km (776 mi, 674 nmi)
- Endurance: 2 hours 15 minutes at 499 km/h (310 mph)
- Service ceiling: 10,000 m (33,000 ft)
- Rate of climb: 15.15 m/s (2,982 ft/min)
- Time to altitude:
  - 5,000 m (16,404 ft) in 5 minutes 30 seconds
- Wing loading: 187.5 kg/m^{2} (38.4 lb/sq ft)
- Power/mass: 0.5 kW/kg (0.3 hp/lb)

Armament

- Guns:
- 1× Ho-204 37-mm cannon
- 2× Ho-5 20-mm cannon

== See also ==
- Twin-boom aircraft

Aircraft of comparable role, configuration, and era

- De Schelde S.21 – (Netherlands)
- Lockheed P-38 Lightning – (United States)
- Mitsubishi J4M – (Empire of Japan)
- SAAB 21 – (Sweden)
- Tachikawa Ki-94-I – (Empire of Japan)
- Vultee XP-54 – (United States)

Related lists

- List of military aircraft of Japan
- List of pusher aircraft by configuration
