= Nakajima Ki-84 Hayate =

Japanese fighter aircraft

Ki-84 Hayate
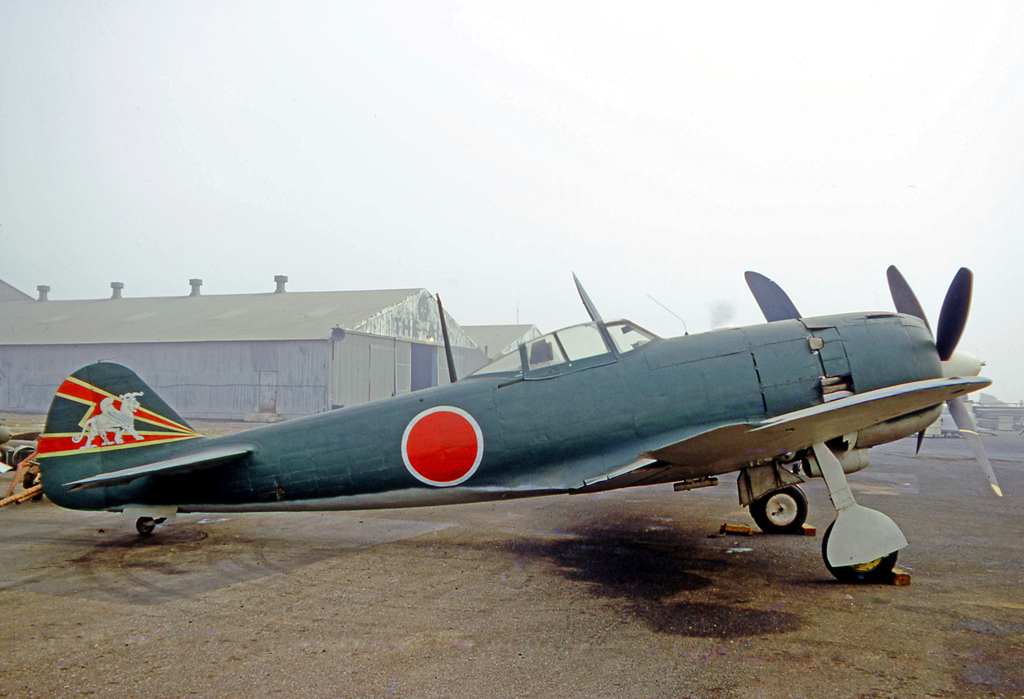
- Pictured in Ontario, California, in 1970. This is the only surviving example of the Ki-84. It is currently preserved at a museum in Chiran, Kagoshima.

General information
- Type: Fighter
- National origin: Japan
- Manufacturer: Nakajima Aircraft Company
- Status: Retired
- Primary users: Imperial Japanese Army Air Force Chinese Nationalist Air Force; Indonesian Air Force
- Number built: 3,514

History
- Introduction date: March 1944
- First flight: April 1943
- Retired: September 1945
- Variant: Nakajima Ki-116

The Nakajima Ki-84 Hayate (キ84 疾風; lit. "Gale") is a single-seat fighter designed and produced by the Japanese aviation manufacturer Nakajima Aircraft Company. Flown by the Imperial Japanese Army Air Service (IJAAS) in the last two years of World War II, its service designation was Army Type 4 Fighter (四式戦闘機, yon-shiki-sentō-ki). The Allied reporting name for the type was "Frank". The Ki-84 is generally considered the best Japanese fighter to operate in large numbers during the conflict.

Development begun in early 1942 via an instruction to produce an all-purpose long-range fighter capable of matching the performance of the best Western fighters then in use. Within one year, Nakajima had designed an aircraft that possessed a relatively high maximum speed, excellent maneuverability, and formidable armament (typically two 30 mm and two 20 mm cannon). It was also considerably more durable than many Japanese fighters of the era due to its incorporation of defensive armor and self-sealing fuel tanks, the result of a drastic difference in design philosophy. The first prototype performed its maiden flight in April 1943; positively received by test pilots, deliveries of the type commenced only one month later. The Ki-84 entered IJAAS service in March 1944, its first deployment being in China while the fighter's first major operation was the Battle of Leyte, where its limited numbers prevented the type from making a greater impact. The Ki-84 was subsequently flown in the defence of the Japanese home islands and the Ryukyu Islands. In addition to the standard fighter models, it was also produced as a dedicated bomber destroyer and high-altitude interceptor, more austere models were also developed.

The performance of the Ki-84 equalled that of any single-engine Allied fighter of the era, and its operational ceiling enabled the interception of high-flying B-29 Superfortress bombers. Pilots and ground crews alike learned to take care of the aircraft's high-maintenance Nakajima Homare engine and landing gear, the latter reportedly prone to buckling. Extensive efforts were made to produce the type en masse, involving multiple production lines and underground facilities being setup, however, these were hampered by Japan's increasingly unfavourable situation during the later stages of the conflict. The aircraft's field performance suffered as manufacturing defects multiplied, good quality fuel proved difficult to procure, and experienced pilots grew scarce. Nevertheless, when in a good condition, the Ki-84 was Japan's fastest fighter. A total of 3,514 aircraft were built.

== Design and development ==
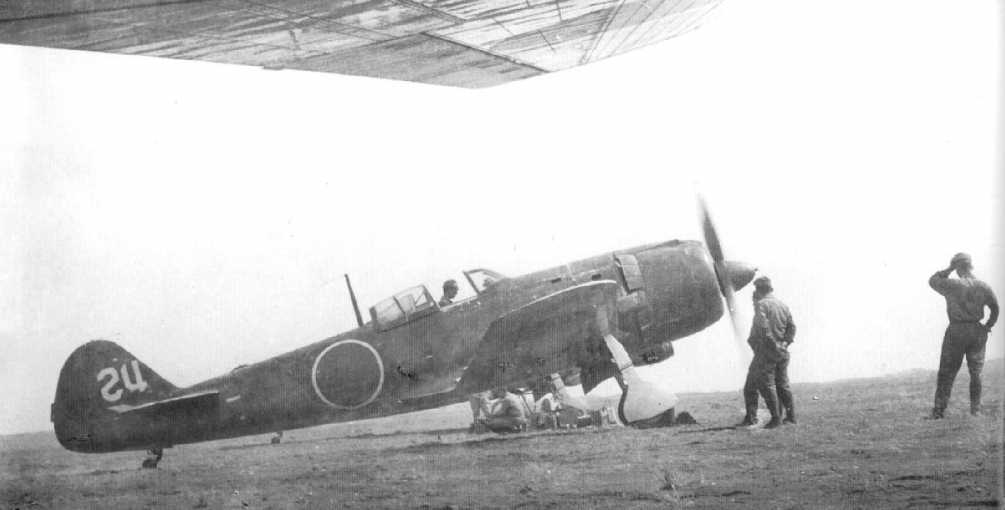
Prototype Nakajima Ki-84 with unique exhaust stack, similar to a Ki-43's

Development of the Ki-84 can be traced back to early 1942 and the issuing of a new instruction from the Koku Hombu (Note: Koku Hombu was the Technical Branch of the Imperial Army Air Headquarters.) to develop an all-purpose long-range successor to the Nakajima Ki-43 fighter, which was only just entering Imperial Japanese Army Air Service (IJAAS) service at that time. The accompanying specification called for a maximum speed of at least 640 kmph (398 mph), a range of 400 km (250 miles); it was also recommended that the aircraft have a wing loading no greater than 170 kg/sq m while the wing area ought to be between 19 and 21 sq m. Provision for both armour and self-sealing fuel tanks was mandated. Furthermore, the need was recognised to combine the maneuverability of the Ki-43 with performance to match the best Western fighters, and heavy firepower.

Nakajima's design team, headed by T. Koyama, opted to address the most common complaints about the Ki-43, which was a popular and highly maneuverable fighter at the time, these being insufficient firepower, poor defensive armor, and lack of climbing speed. The resulting aircraft, designated Ki-84, was a low-wing cantilever monoplane of all-metal construction, except for the fabric-covered control surfaces, and furnished with conventional landing gear. Armament comprised two fuselage-mounted, synchronized 12.7 mm (.50 in) machine guns — in service, these proved challenging to synchronize properly with the Hayate's four-blade propeller — and two wing-mounted 20 mm cannon. In addition, the Ki-84 used a 65 mm (2.56 in) armor-glass canopy, 13 mm (.51 in) of head and back armor, and multiple bulkheads in the fuselage, which protected both the methanol-water tank (used to increase the effectiveness of the supercharger) and the centrally located fuel tank. Provision was made for the fitting of a single centreline drop tank.

In April 1943, the prototype performed its maiden flight from Ojima Airfield. Joined by a second prototype two months later, the flight test programme proceeded quickly and relatively trouble-free. Both prototypes, along with several further aircraft drawn from an initial service trials batch of 73 airframes, were delivered to the Tachikawa Army Air Arsenal for evaluation. The type was favourably received at this time, IJAAS pilots often praised its performance, although it was observed that the aircraft was unable to attain the maximum speed that had been set out by the Koku Hombu, only attaining 624 kmh (388 mph) during flight trials. Nevertheless, it was able to demonstrate the best performance of any Japanese aircraft ready for mass production at that time. In October 1943, intensive service trials intended to reproduce operational conditions were initiated by an experimental unit, the first such unit to receive the Ki-84. Performing positively during these trials, the aircraft was promptly accepted into IJAAS service and Nakajima was instructed to proceed with mass production of the type. Only minor changes were made across the service trials batch, which was produced by August 1943 and March 1944, including fuselage modifications for ease of production as well as reshaping of the fin and rudder to improve control during takeoff.

It was the Nakajima firm's own-designed 35.8-litre (2,180 cu in) displacement, Ha-45 Homare ("Praise" or "Honor") air-cooled eighteen-cylinder radial engine, first accepted for military use in 1941, that has been credited with enabling the aircraft to attain high speeds. Derived from the Nakajima Homare engines common to many Japanese aircraft, the Hayate was powered by multiple versions of the Homare engine, including the carbureted model 21 and the fuel-injected model 23 versions of the engine. Most Homare engines used water injection to aid the supercharger in giving the Ki-84 a rated 1,491 kW (2,000 hp) at takeoff. This combination theoretically gave it a climb rate and top speed roughly competitive with the top Allied fighters. Initial Hayate testing at Tachikawa in early summer 1943 saw test pilot Lieutenant Funabashi reach a maximum level airspeed of 624 km/h (387 mph) in the second prototype. In 1946, US Technical Intelligence bench-tested a Homare 45, Model 21 engine and verified the engine's maximum horsepower output using 96 octane AvGas, plus methanol injection.

The complicated Ha-45-21 carbureted engine was a compact design (only 3 cm (1.18 in) larger in diameter than the Ki-43's 27.9 litres (1,700 cu in) 14-cylinder Nakajima Sakae radial) that required a great deal of care in construction and maintenance and it became increasingly difficult to maintain the type's designed performance as the Allies advanced toward the Japanese homeland. To compound reliability problems, the Allied submarine blockade prevented delivery of crucial components, such as the landing gear. Many landing gear units were compromised by the poor-quality heat treatment of late-war Japanese steel. As a result, many Hayates suffered strut collapses on landing. Further damage was caused by inadequately trained late war pilots, who sometimes found it difficult to transition to the relatively "hot" Ki-84 from the comparatively docile Ki-43, which had a significantly lower landing speed. Although the design was itself solid, growing difficulties in securing skilled pilots, proper fuel and construction materials, and adequate manufacture often prevented the aircraft from reaching its full potential in the field.

Efforts were made to expand production of the Ki-84; another company, Manchuria Airplane Manufacturing Company, established their own production line for the type in Harbin, Manchuria, upon which 95 aircraft were completed. Nakajima also established a second assembly line at Utsonomiya; in December 1944 alone, the firm produced 373 Ki-84s, which was a greater number than any other Japanese aircraft at that point. The destruction of Nakajima's engine production facility in Musashi by the United States Army Air Force's (USAAF) 20th Air Force heavily set back production of the Ki-84, although the Ha-45 would still be manufactured on an underground production line in Asakawa and another plant in Hamamatsu.

== Operational service ==
In March 1944, the 22nd Sentai started to be re-equipped with production Ki-84s, the first such unit to do so. This unit was first dispatched to the Chinese theatre, where it saw action against the USAAF's 14th Air Force and began to prove itself an equal to its Western counterparts. After only roughly five weeks of combat, the unit was relocated to the Philippines as part of the wider Japanese preparations to defend against an Allied invasion. Accordingly, the Ki-84's first major operational action occurred during the Battle of Leyte during late 1944; however, the limited numbers and serviceability issues prevented the type from making a more decisive impact.

Up until the end of the Pacific War, the Ki-84 was deployed wherever the action was intense. As such, it participated in the defence of the Japanese home islands and the Ryukyu Islands. Though it lacked sufficient high-altitude performance, the Ki-84 performed well at medium and low levels. It quickly gained a reputation as a combat aircraft to be reckoned with.

In addition to the standard fighter models, dedicated bomber destroyer variants also entered IJAAS service. On 15 April 1945, eleven Hayates attacked US airfields on Okinawa, destroying a large number of Allied aircraft on the ground.

In the final year of the conflict, the Ki-84, the Ki-100 (essentially a radial-engined version of the inline-powered Kawasaki Ki-61), and Kawanishi's N1K2-J were the three Japanese fighters best suited to combat the newer Allied fighters.

== Variants ==
The Tachikawa Ki-106, a derivative of the Ki-84

- Ki-84-a

Prototype.

- Ki-84-b

Evaluation model.

- Ki-84-c

Pre-production model.

- Ki-84-I Ko

Armed with 2 × 12.7 mm Ho-103 machine guns
and 2 × 20mm Ho-5 cannons in wings (most widely produced version).

- Ki-84-I Otsu

Armed with 4 × 20 mm Ho-5 cannon.
(Limited production run, may not have equipped a full Sentai)

- Ki-84-I Hei

Armed with 2 × 20 mm Ho-5 cannon and 2 × 30 mm Ho-155 cannon in wings.

- Ki-84-I Tei

Night fighter variant of Ki-84 Otsu. Equipped with an additional Ho-5 20 mm cannon (300 shells) placed at 45-degree angle behind the cockpit in Schräge Musik configuration. Rare variant, two built.

- Ki-84-I Ko - Manshu Type

Manufactured in Manchukuo for Manshūkoku Hikōki Seizo KK by Nakajima License.

- Ki-84-II

Sometimes known as the 'Hayate-Kai', the Ki-84-II had certain duralumin components replaced with ones made of wood and plywood, mainly concerning the rear fuselage, tail unit elements, wing tips, push-pull rods and other, minor components. This model was produced with the designations Ko, Otsu and Hei depending on the armament.

- Ki-84-III

A planned conversion of the Ki-84 into a high-attitude interceptor after development of the Ki-87 prototype was delayed. Replaced the Homare engine with a 2450 hp Nakajima Ha-44 12 Ru air cooled radial engine with a turbo-supercharger mounted under the fuselage. The airframe remained unchanged, aside from the engine mountings to support the larger diameter engine. The airplane did not progress beyond the design stage.

- Ki-84 Sa Go

Oxygen injection system replacing the traditional water-methanol injection system to improve high attitude performance. No prototypes were built.

- Ki-84-N

1st high-altitude interceptor variant of the Ki-84, with a 2500 hp Nakajima Ha-219 air cooled radial engine and with wing area increased to 249.19 square feet. The Ki-84-N production model was assigned to the Kitai 'Ki-117'. Neither aircraft left the design stage before the war's end.

- Ki-84-P

2nd high-altitude interceptor variant of the Ki-84, with a 2500 hp Nakajima Ha-219 air cooled radial engine and with wing area increased to 263.4 square feet. Cancelled in favor of further development of the Ki-84-R, which was proving to be a less ambitious project.

- Ki-84-R

3rd high-altitude interceptor variant of the Ki-84, with a 2000 hp Nakajima Ha-45-44 with a mechanically driven two-stage three-speed supercharger. The prototype was 80% completed at the war's end.

- Ki-106

Prototype, constructed mainly out of wood. Three built.

- Ki-113

Based on the Ki-84 Otsu, with certain steel components on different areas of the aircraft. The project was an attempt to sustain light alloys, which were becoming very scarce later in the war. It employed steel sheet skinning and the cockpit section, ribs, and bulkheads were made of carbon steel.

- Ki-116

Evaluation model, equipped with a Mitsubishi Ha-112-II (Ha-33-62), 1,120 kW (1,500 hp). One built..

- Ki-117

Production designation of the Ki-84N.

== Production ==
Ki-84 Production: Ota and Utsunomiya, Nakajima Hikoki K.K.
Year
Year	Jan.	Feb.	Mar.	Apr.	May	June	July	Aug.	Sept.	Oct.	Nov.	Dec.	Annual
1943								1	1	3	11	8	24
1944	9	25	25	97	86	138	145	121	261	301	323	373	1,904
1945	357	129	216	185	198	168	194	48					1,485
Total													3,413

Not included:

- Pre-production started with two prototypes completed in March and April 1943.
- A further 94 Ki-84-I Ko's were assembled at Mansyu Hikoki Seizo K.K. aircraft plant in Harbin.

Total Production
According to USSBS Report: 3,413	Figure includes: 3,413 Ki 84-I and Ki-84 II builds.
According to Francillon: 3,514	Figure includes: 3,509 Ki 84-I and Ki-84 II builds, with 1 Ki-106, 1 Ki-113, 3 Ki-106 prototypes.

== Operators ==
Wartime

Japan

- Imperial Japanese Army Air Service

Post-war

China

- People's Liberation Army Air Force operated captured aircraft from 1945 until the 1950s.

China

- Chinese Nationalist Air Force held some Ki-84 in reserve in case American aid was cut.

Indonesia

- Indonesian Air Force - In 1945, Indonesian People's Security Force (IPSF) (Indonesian pro-independence guerrillas) captured a small number of aircraft at numerous Japanese air bases, including Bugis Air Base in Malang (repatriated 18 September 1945). Most aircraft were destroyed in military conflicts between the Netherlands and the newly proclaimed Republic of Indonesia during the Indonesian National Revolution of 1945–1949.

== Surviving aircraft ==
After the conflict, a number of aircraft were tested by the Allied forces, two at the Allied Technical Air Intelligence Unit - South-West Pacific Area (ATAIU-SWPA) as S10 and S17 and a further two in the United States as FE-301 and FE-302 (Later T2-301 and T2-302).

One example captured at Clark Field during 1945, serial number 1446, was transported aboard the aircraft carrier USS Long Island to the United States. In 1952 it was sold off as surplus to Edward Maloney, owner of the Ontario Air Museum (Planes of Fame Air Museum) and restored to flying condition before being returned to Japan for display at the Arashiyama Museum in Kyoto in 1973. With unsupervised access allowed to the aircraft, parts were stolen from the Ki-84, and coupled with the years of neglect it could no longer fly. Following the museum's closure in 1991, the aircraft was transferred to the Tokko Heiwa Kinen-kan Museum, Kagoshima Prefecture, where it still is displayed to this day. It is the only surviving Ki-84.

=== Gallery ===
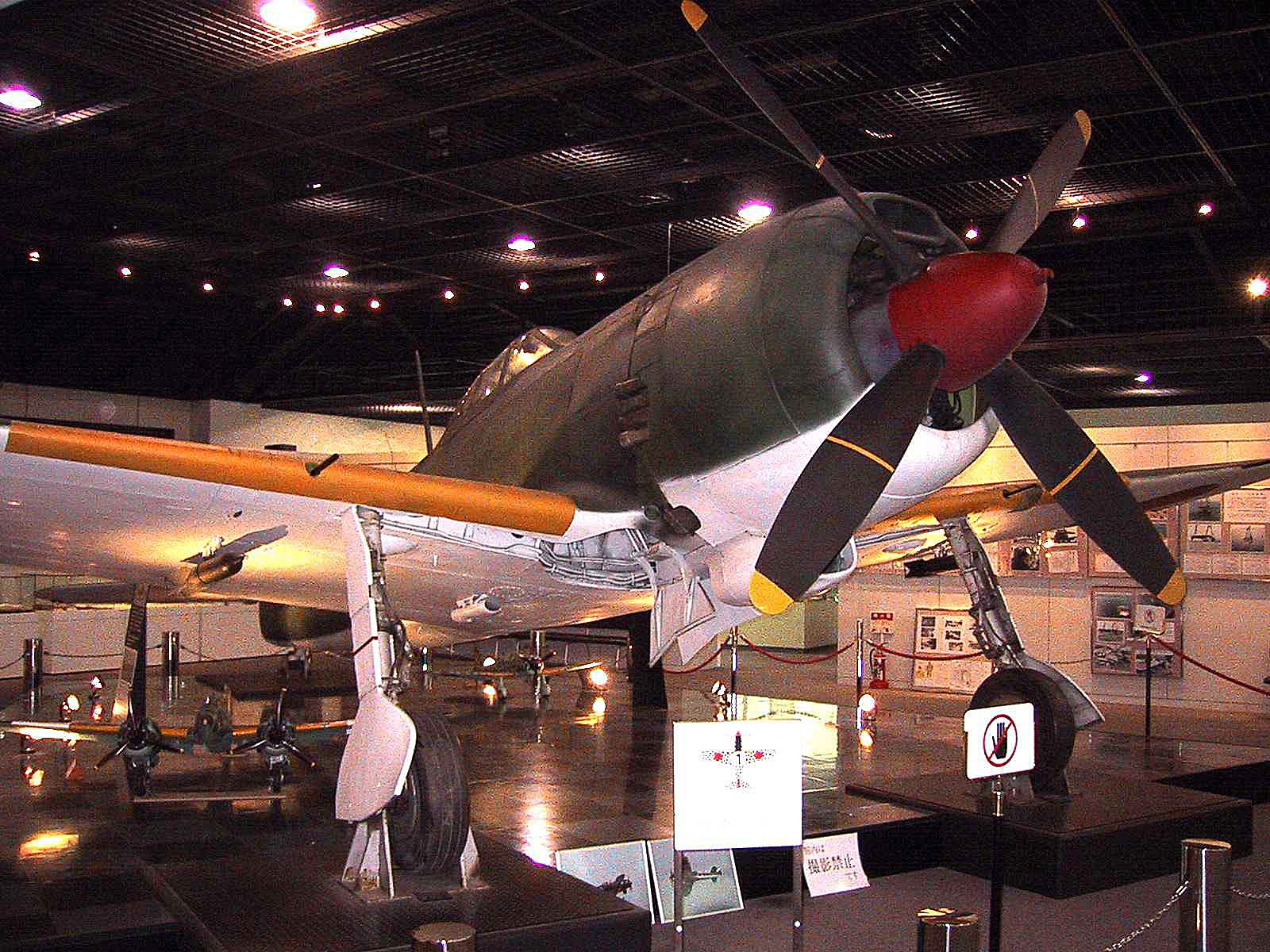

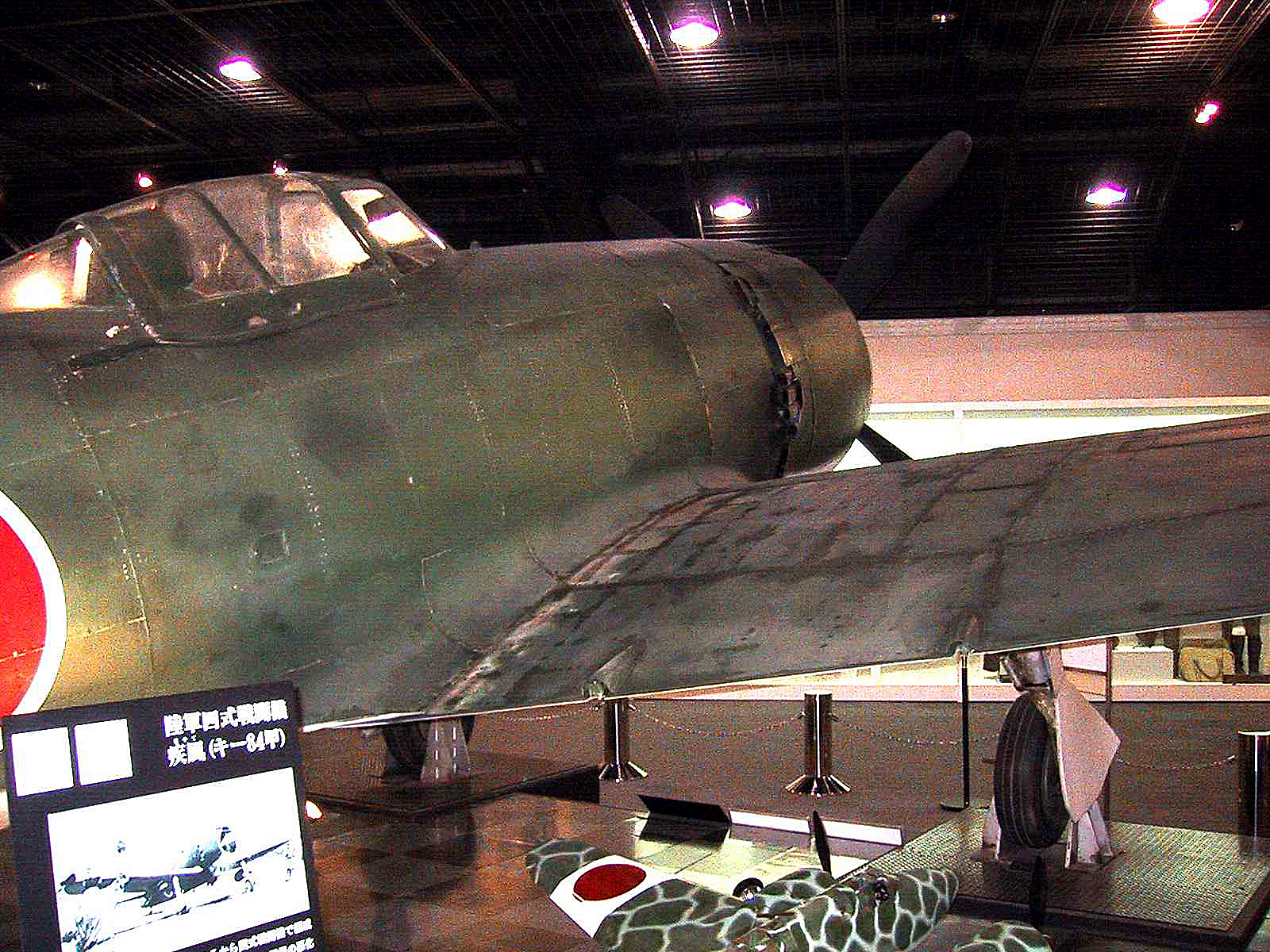

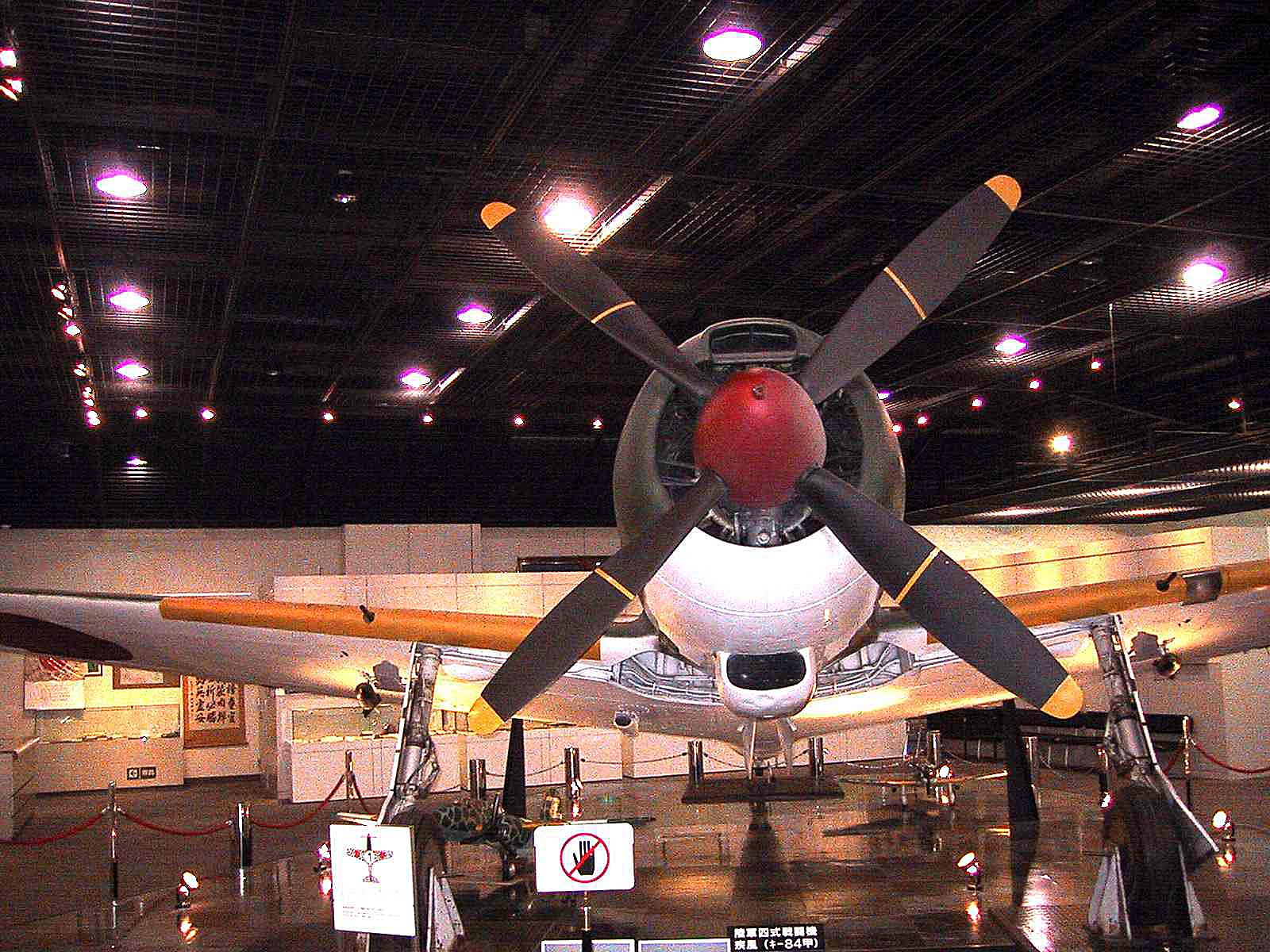

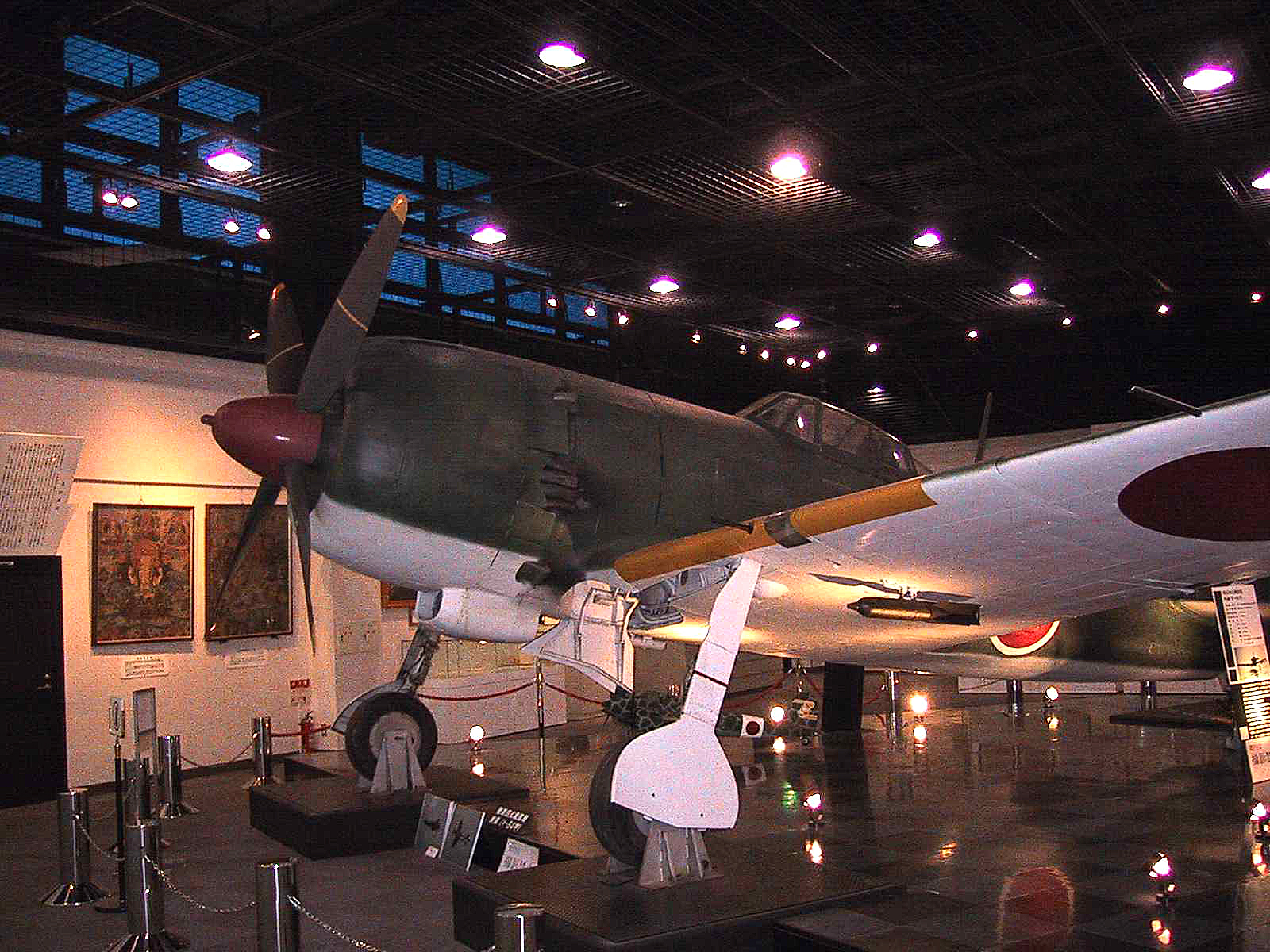

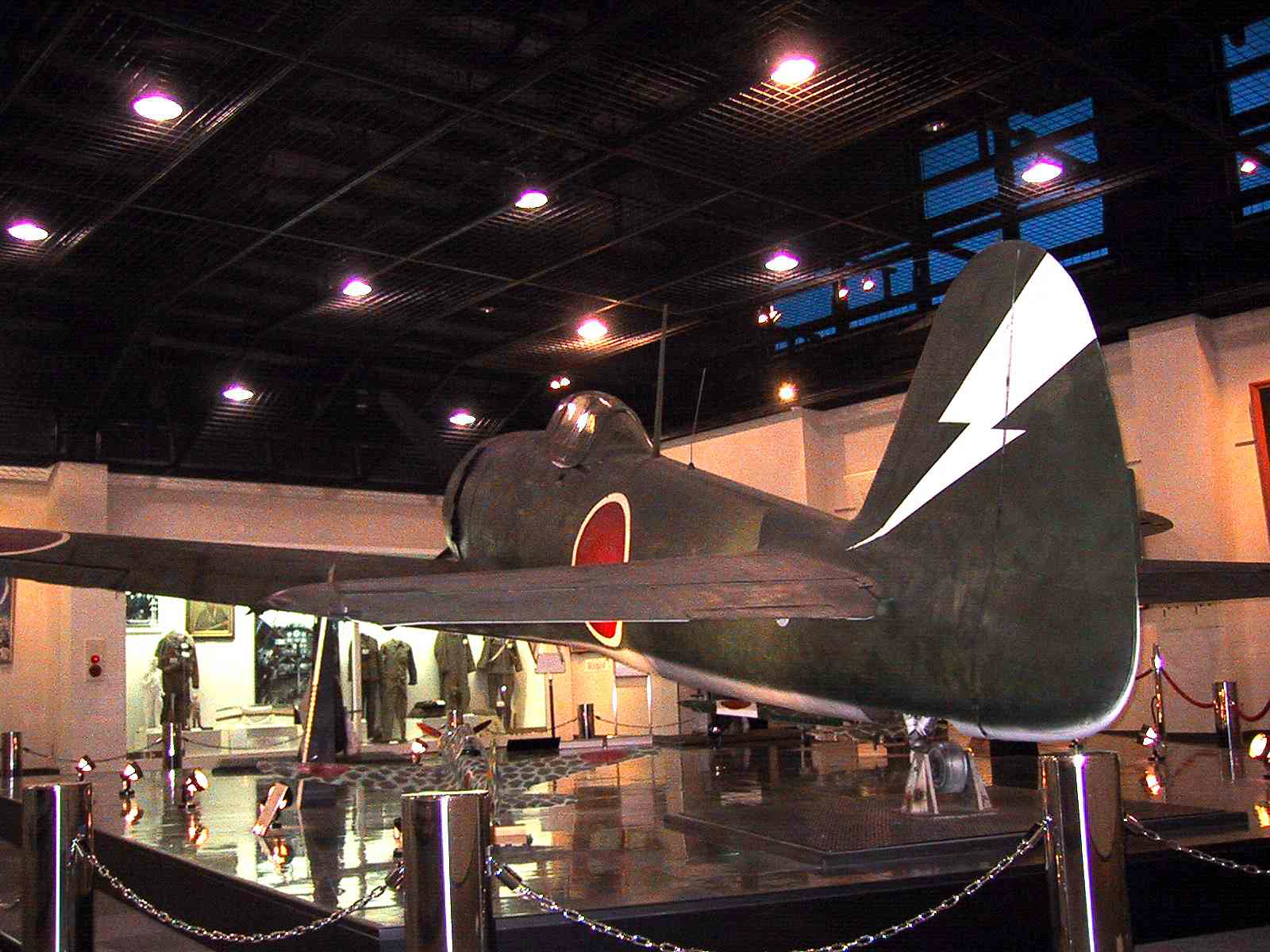

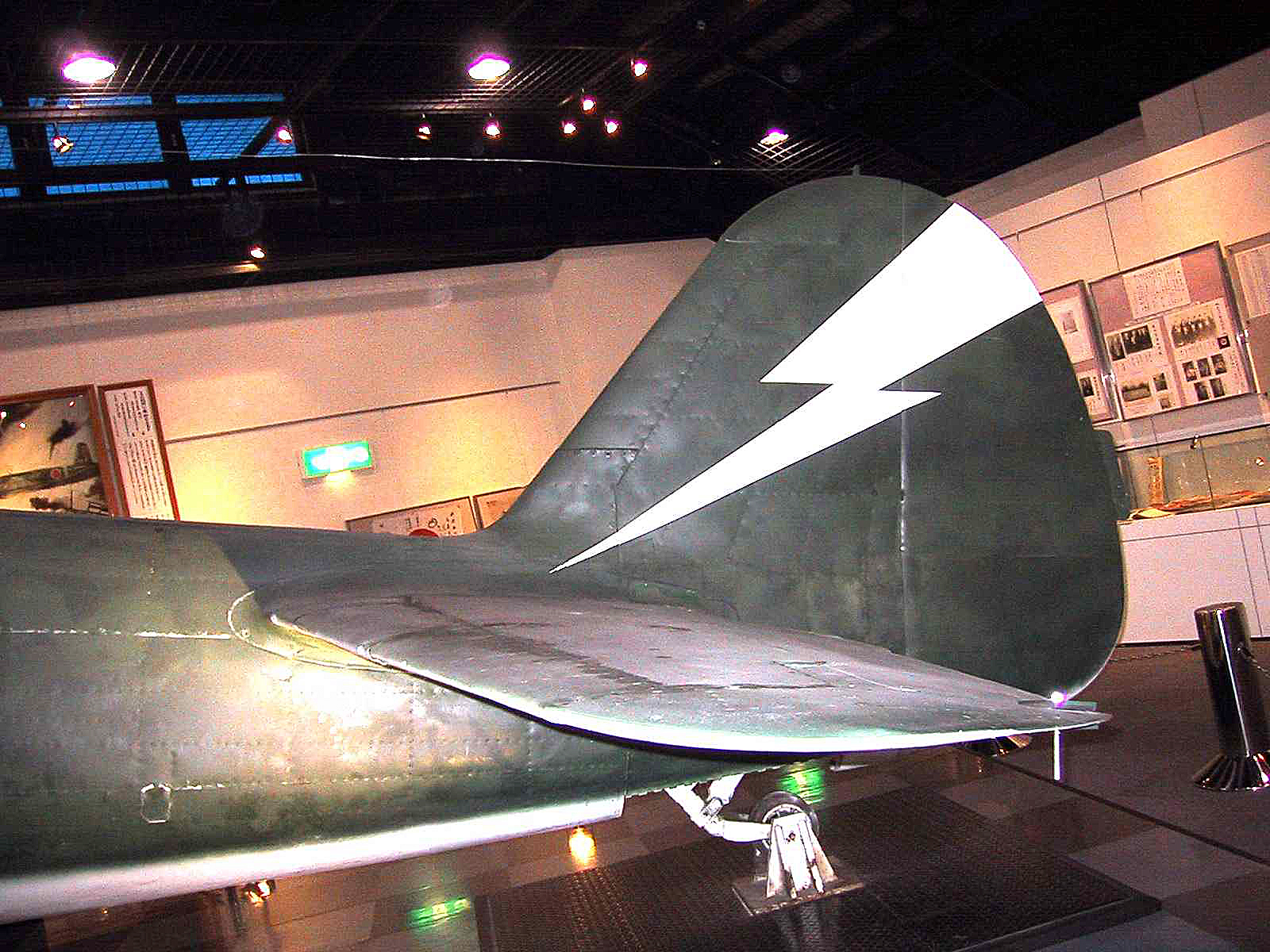

== Specifications (Ki-84-Ia) ==
3-view drawing of Nakajima ki-84

Data from Report on Frank 1

General characteristics

- Crew: One
- Length: 9.92 m (32 ft 7 in)
- Wingspan: 11.238 m (36 ft 10 in)
- Height: 3.385 m (11 ft 1 in)
- Wing area: 21 m^{2} (230 sq ft)
- Airfoil: root: NN-21(16.5%); tip: NN-21(8%)
- Empty weight: 2,660 kg (5,864 lb)
- Gross weight: 3,601.5 kg (7,940 lb)
- Max takeoff weight: 4,170 kg (9,193 lb)
- Powerplant: 1 × Nakajima Homare Model Ha-45-21 (or Models 11, 12, 21, 23 or 25) 18-cylinder air-cooled radial piston engine, 1,522 kW (2,041 hp) at sea level and 1,360 kW (1,820 hp) at 5,500 m (17,900 ft)
- Propellers: 4-bladed constant-speed metal propeller

Performance

- Maximum speed: 687 km/h (427 mph, 371 kn) at 7,000 m (23,000 ft)
- Range: 2,168 km (1,347 mi, 1,171 nmi)
- Service ceiling: 11,826 m (38,800 ft)
- Rate of climb: 21.84 m/s (4,300 ft/min) at sea level

18.29 m/s (3,600 ft/min) at 3,050 m (10,010 ft)

- Wing loading: 171.47 kg/m^{2} (35.12 lb/sq ft)
- Power/mass: 0.41 kW/kg (0.25 hp/lb)

Armament

- 2 × 12.7 mm (0.5 in) Ho-103 machine guns in nose, 350 rounds/gun
- 2 × 20 mm (0.787 in) Ho-5 cannon in wings, 150 shells/cannon
- 2 × 250 kg (550 lb) bombs
- 2× 200 L (53 US gal) drop tanks

== See also ==
Related development

- Kawasaki Ki-61
- Nakajima Ki-43
- Nakajima Ki-44
- Nakajima Ki-116

Aircraft of comparable role, configuration, and era

- Focke-Wulf Fw 190
- Hawker Tempest
- Kawanishi N1K
- Kawasaki Ki-100
- Lavochkin La-7
- Lavochkin La-9
- Lavochkin La-11
- Mitsubishi A7M
- Nakajima Ki-87
- North American P-51 Mustang
- Republic P-47 Thunderbolt
- Supermarine Spitfire (Griffon-powered variants)
- Yakovlev Yak-9
- Yakovlev Yak-3U
- Vought F4U Corsair

Related lists

- List of aircraft of World War II
- List of aircraft of Japan during World War II

== Further development ==
- Aeronautical Staff of Aero Publishers Inc. (1965). Nakajima Ki-84 (Aero Series 2). Fallbrook, California, USA: Aero Publishers, Inc. ISBN 0-8168-0504-0.
- Caruana, Richard J. (October 2004). "The Nakajima Ki-84 Hayate". Scale Aviation Modeller International. Vol. 10, no. 10. Bedford, UK.
- Francillon, René J. (1966). The Nakajima Hayate (Aircraft in Profile, Number 70). Leatherhead, Surrey, UK: Profile Publications.
- Green, William; Swanborough, Gordon (1976). JWW2 Aircraft Fact Files: Japanese Army Fighters, Part 1. London, UK: Macdonald and Jane's. ISBN 0-356-08224-5. OCLC 820486093.
- Huggins, Mark (May–June 1999). "Setting Sun: Japanese Air Defence of the Philippines 1944–1945". Air Enthusiast (81): 28–35. ISSN 0143-5450.
- Sakaida, Henry (1997). Japanese Army Air Force Aces 1937–45. Botley, Oxford, UK: Osprey Publishing. ISBN 1-85532-529-2.
- Sims, Edward H. (1980). Fighter Tactics and Strategy 1914–1970. Fallbrook, California, USA: Aero Publishers. ISBN 0-8168-8795-0.
- Nakajima Aircraft Company, Ltd (Report). Washington, D.C., USA: United States Strategic Bombing Survey, Aircraft Division. 1947.
- Wieliczko, Leszek A. (2005). Nakajima Ki-84 Hayate. Lublin, Poland: Kagero. ISBN 83-89088-76-2.
- Yon-Shiki Sentoki Hayate (Pacific War No. 46). Tokyo, Japan: Gakken. 2004. ISBN 4-05-603574-1.
