= Mitsubishi J4M Senden =

Japanese fighter proposal

J4M Senden

General information
- Type: Fighter aircraft
- Manufacturer: Mitsubishi Heavy Industries
- Primary user: Imperial Japanese Navy (intended)
- Number built: None

The Mitsubishi J4M Senden (閃電 "Flashing Lightning") or Navy Experimental 17-Shi Otsu B Type Interceptor Fighter Senden, Allied reporting name Luke, was a Japanese World War II fighter aircraft proposed by Mitsubishi Heavy Industries for use by the Imperial Japanese Navy. The J4M project did not proceed beyond the design stage.

== Design and development ==
To provide the Imperial Japanese Navy with a land-based high-performance interceptor aircraft, Mitsubishi designed the J4M. It was to have been a single-seat, twin-boom, low-wing monoplane with a central nacelle housing an unstepped cockpit and a 1,590-kilowatt (2,130-hp) Mitsubishi Ha-43 radial engine behind the pilot driving a four-bladed pusher propeller rotating between the booms. The booms were to extend aft from the leading edge of the wing and were mounted below the central nacelle. The aircraft was to have had tricycle landing gear and an armament of one 30-mm and two 20-mm cannon.

Design of the initial J4M1 version ended when the Navy put its support behind the competing Kyūshū J7W fighter, and Mitsubishi did not build a prototype. The Allies nonetheless assigned the J4M the reporting name "Luke" during World War II.

== Specifications (J4M estimated) ==
Data from Japanese Secret Projects:Experimental aircraft of the IJA and IJN 1939-1945

General characteristics

- Crew: 1
- Length: 12.98 m (42 ft 7 in)
- Wingspan: 12.49 m (41 ft 0 in)
- Height: 3.47 m (11 ft 5 in)
- Wing area: 22 m^{2} (240 sq ft)
- Empty weight: 3,400 kg (7,496 lb)
- Gross weight: 4,400 kg (9,700 lb)
- Max takeoff weight: 5,255 kg (11,585 lb)
- Powerplant: 1 × Mitsubishi MK9D 18-cyl. two-row fan assisted air-cooled radial piston engine, 1,600 kW (2,100 hp) at take-off

1,416.8 kW (1,900 hp) at 2,000 m (6,600 ft)
1,230.4 kW (1,650 hp) at 8,000 m (26,000 ft)

- Propellers: 6-bladed metal constant speed propeller, 3.2 m (10 ft 6 in) diameter

Performance

- Maximum speed: 756 km/h (470 mph, 408 kn) at 8,000 m (26,000 ft)
- Cruise speed: 462 km/h (287 mph, 249 kn)
- Landing speed: 147 km/h (91 mph)
- Endurance: 2 hours 12 minutes
- Service ceiling: 12,000 m (39,000 ft)
- Rate of climb: 8.89 m/s (1,750 ft/min)
- Time to altitude: 8,000 m (26,000 ft) in 15 minutes
- Wing loading: 199.69 kg/m^{2} (40.90 lb/sq ft)

Armament

- Guns: 1x 30mm Type 5 cannon with 100 rounds + 2x 20mm Type 99 cannon with 200 rounds per gun in the fuselage nose
- Bombs: provision for 2x 30 kg (66 lb) or 2x 60 kg (132 lb) bombs

== See also ==
Aircraft of comparable role, configuration, and era

- Lockheed P-38 Lightning
- Mansyū Ki-98
- SAAB 21
- SNCASO SO.8000 Narval
- Vultee XP-54 Swoose Goose

Related lists

- List of military aircraft of Japan
- Twin-boom aircraft
