= Manchuria Airplane Manufacturing Company =

Aircraft company in Manchukuo in the 1930s and 1940s

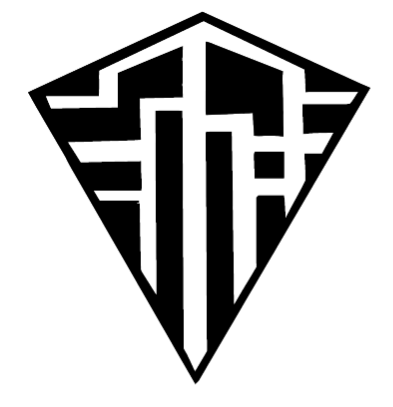
Emblem of Manchuria Airplane Manufacturing Company

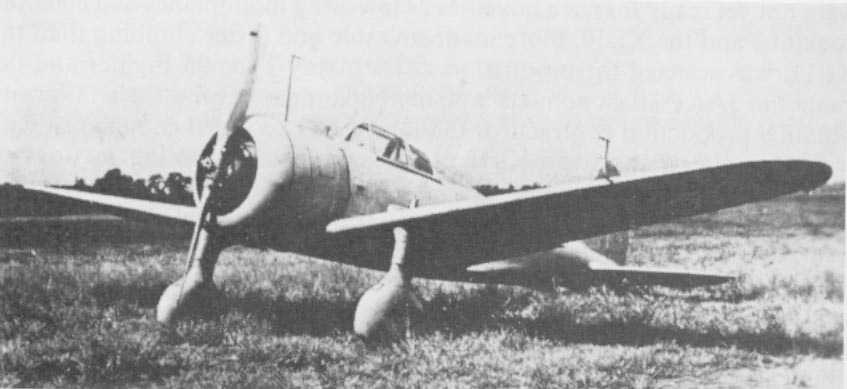
The Ki-27 and its derivates were the most commonly produced aircraft by Manshū

The Manchuria Airplane Manufacturing Company (traditional:滿洲國飛行機製造株式會社; shinjitai: 満州国飛行機製造株式会社 Japanese Hepburn: Manshū Koku Hikōki Seizō Kabushiki Kaisha; Chinese pinyin: Mǎnzhōu Guó Fēixíngjī Zhìzào Zhūshì Huìshè) was an aircraft company in Manchukuo in the 1930s and 1940s, producing a variety of mostly military aircraft and aircraft components. It was named Manshū or Mansyuu in short.

== History ==
The Manchuria Airplane Manufacturing Company was established in late 1938 under the supervision of the Japanese government as a subsidiary of the Nakajima Aircraft Company of Japan. Its main plant was located in Harbin, Manchukuo.

From 1941 to 1945, Manshū produced a total of 2,196 airframes (eighth among Japanese airframe manufacturers), of which 798 were combat aircraft. The company also produced 2,168 aircraft engines (sixth among Japanese aircraft engine manufacturers). In addition, Manshū provided repair services for a variety of aircraft in the Manchukuo Air Force and for Imperial Japanese Army Air Force units stationed in Manchukuo.

== Licensed production ==
Manshū produced a variety of Japanese aircraft under license production agreements:

- Kawasaki Ki-10 (World War II Allied reporting name "Perry") fighter
- Kawasaki Ki-32 (Allied reporting name "Mary") light bomber
- Kawasaki Ki-45 Toryu (Allied reporting name "Nick") twin-engined fighter
- Kawasaki Ki-61 Hien (Allied reporting name "Tony") fighter
- Kawasaki Type 88 (KDA-2) light bomber and reconnaissance aircraft
- Mitsubishi Ki-15 (Allied reporting name "Babs") reconnaissance aircraft
- Mitsubishi Ki-30 (Allied reporting name "Ann") light bomber
- Mitsubishi Ki-46 (Allied reporting name "Dinah") reconnaissance aircraft
- Manshū Super Universal (license built Fokker Super Universal)
- Nakajima Ki-27 (Allied reporting name "Nate") light fighter (1,379 units)
- Nakajima Ki-34 (Allied reporting name "Thora") transport
- Nakajima Ki-43Ia Hayabusa (Allied reporting name "Oscar") fighter
- Nakajima Ki-44Ia Shoki (Allied reporting name "Tojo") fighter
- Nakajima Ki-84 Hayate (Allied reporting name "Frank") advanced fighter (94 units)
- Nakajima Ki-116 advanced fighter, also known as Manshū Ki-116
- Nakajima Type 91 (NC) fighter
- Tachikawa Ki-9 (Allied reporting name "Spruce") intermediate trainer
- Tachikawa Ki-54 (Allied reporting name "Hickory") advanced trainer
- Tachikawa Ki-55 (Allied reporting name "Ida") advanced trainer

== Independent designs ==
Manshū also developed a number of aircraft independently:

- Manshū Hayabusa I, II, and III airliner (30 units)
- Manshū Ki-79 advanced trainer version of Nakajima Ki-27
- Manshū Ki-71 dive bomber prototype (Allied reporting name "Edna")
- Mansyū Ki-98 advanced twin-boom high-altitude interceptor project

Among the Manshū independent designs, however, only the Ki-79 advanced trainer reached mass production, as the Army Type 2 Advanced Trainer.
