= Mitsubishi Ha-43 =

1940s Japanese radial engine

Ha-43
- Type: 18-cylinder two-row radial aircraft engine
- National origin: Japan
- Manufacturer: Mitsubishi Heavy Industries

The Mitsubishi Ha-43, known as the Ha-211 by the Imperial Japanese Army Air Force (IJAAF) and MK9 by the Imperial Japanese Navy Air Service (IJNAS)), was a Japanese 18-cylinder, twin-row air-cooled radial engine developed during World War II. It was a more powerful derivative of Mitsubishi's 14-cylinder Kinsei. While planned for use in several promising aircraft, only prototypes were made and the engine never saw combat.

== Design and development ==
The Ha-43 was Mitsubishi's answer to Nakajima's Ha-45. The engine was planned to produce 2,200 hp (1,600 kW) while retaining high reliability and a superior power-to-weight ratio compared to contemporary engines in its class. The frontal area per hp. was also intended to be the smallest in the world. However, such ambitious targets necessitated extraordinary efforts and ingenuity at the same time.

At the time, Mitsubishi was working to promote a different engine, the Ha-42 (an 18-cylinder derivative of the Kasei), development of which was prioritized above the Ha-43's, delaying its completion. Consequently, the Ha-45 entered service first, albeit plagued with reliability issues, which would also trouble the Ha-43. Numerous promising aircraft, such as the Kyushu J7W interceptor and Mitsubishi's own A7M Reppu fighter, were planned to use the Ha-43, but in the end, such aircraft did not see service before Japan's surrender, nor did the engine itself.

== Variants and designations ==
Data from: Japanese Aero-Engines 1910-1945

A20
Company designation
Ha-211
IJAAF designation
MK9
IJNAS designation
Ha-43
Unified (IJAAF and IJNAS) designation system

== Applications ==
- Kawanishi N1K5-J (project; not built)
- Kyushu J7W1
- Mansyū Ki-98
- Mitsubishi A7M2/A7M3
- Mitsubishi J4M
- Mitsubishi Ki-83

== Specifications (Ha-43/Ha-211/MK9) ==
Data from Japanese Aero-Engines 1910-1945.

=== General characteristics ===
- Type: 18-cylinder air-cooled two-row radial piston engine
- Bore: 140 mm (5.5 in.)
- Stroke: 150 mm (5.9 in.)
- Displacement: 41.7 L (2,546 cu in.)
- Length: 2,020 mm (79.5 in.)
- Diameter: 1,230 mm (48.4 in.)
- Dry weight: 980 kg (2,161 lb)

=== Components ===
- Supercharger: Centrifugal two-speed mechanical supercharger

=== Performance ===
- Power output: 1,641 kW (2,200 hp) at 2,900 rpm
- Compression ratio: 7.2
- boost +350 mm Hg

== See also ==
Related lists

- List of aircraft engines
