= Asakawa =

Asakawa (written: 朝河 or 浅川) is a Japanese surname. Notable people with the surname include:

- Asakawa brothers, Japanese academics
  - Noritaka Asakawa (浅川 伯教, 1884–1964)
  - Takumi Asakawa (浅川 巧, 1891–1931)
- Kan'ichi Asakawa (朝河 貫一, 1873–1948), Japanese academic and historian
- Maki Asakawa (浅川 マキ, 1942–2010), Japanese jazz singer and composer
- Masatsugu Asakawa (浅川 雅嗣, born 1958), Japanese civil servant
- Nana Asakawa (浅川 梨奈, born 1999), Japanese actress and former singer
- Yū Asakawa (浅川 悠, born 1975), Japanese voice actress

== See also ==
- Asakawa, Fukushima, town in Japan
- Asakawa Station, train station in Tokushima Prefecture, Japan
