= Ho-5 cannon =

20 mm autocannon

Ho-05 cannon
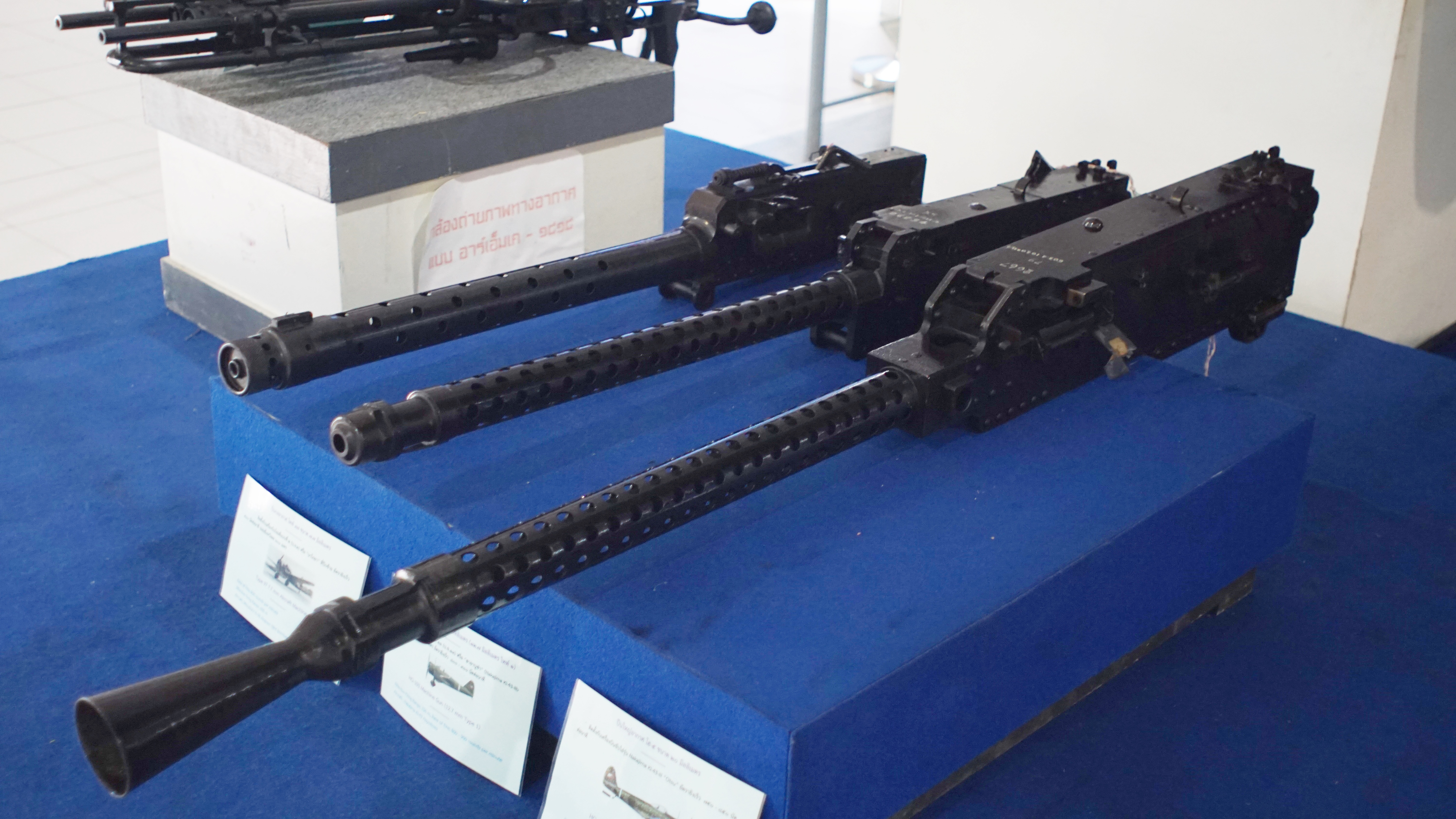
- Type-97 (top), Ho-103 (middle), Ho-05 cannon (bottom) in Royal Thai Air Force Museum.
- Type: Aircraft autocannon
- Place of origin: Empire of Japan

Service history
- Used by: Imperial Japanese Army Air Service; Imperial Japanese Navy Air Service
- Wars: World War II

Specifications
- Mass: 37 kg (82 lb)
- Length: 1,444 mm (56.9 in)
- Barrel length: 900 mm (35 in)
- Cartridge: 20×94mm
- Calibre: 20 mm (0.79 in)
- Action: Short recoil-operated
- Rate of fire: Early version: 820 rounds/min Later version: 700-750 rounds/min 500 rounds/min (synchronized)
- Muzzle velocity: 735 m/s (2,410 ft/s)
- Feed system: 150-round Belt

The Ho-5 (Army Type 2) was a Japanese aircraft autocannon used during World War II. Developed from the Ho-103 machine gun, it was a version of the American Model 1921 Browning aircraft machine gun. It replaced the Ho-1 and Ho-3 (Army Type 97) in general service. The Ho-5 was belt-fed using typical Browning-style steel disintegrating links. The cartridge used was a shortened version of the Allied 20 × 110mm Hispano-Suiza HS.404.

The Ho-5 was used mostly as wing mounts in late-war fighters but saw limited cowl-mounted use in fighters and as flexible-mounted defensive armament (retrofit) in bombers.

== Specifications ==
- Caliber: 20mm (0.8 in)
- Ammunition: 20×94mm (84.5 g)
- Weight: 37 kg (77 lb)
- Rate of fire: 750 rounds/min
- Muzzle velocity: 750 m/s (2,460 ft/s)
- Magazine: 150-round belt

== See also ==
- List of firearms
- List of weapons of military aircraft of Germany during World War II
- List of common World War II infantry weapons
- M2 Browning machine gun
