= McLaren Solus GT =

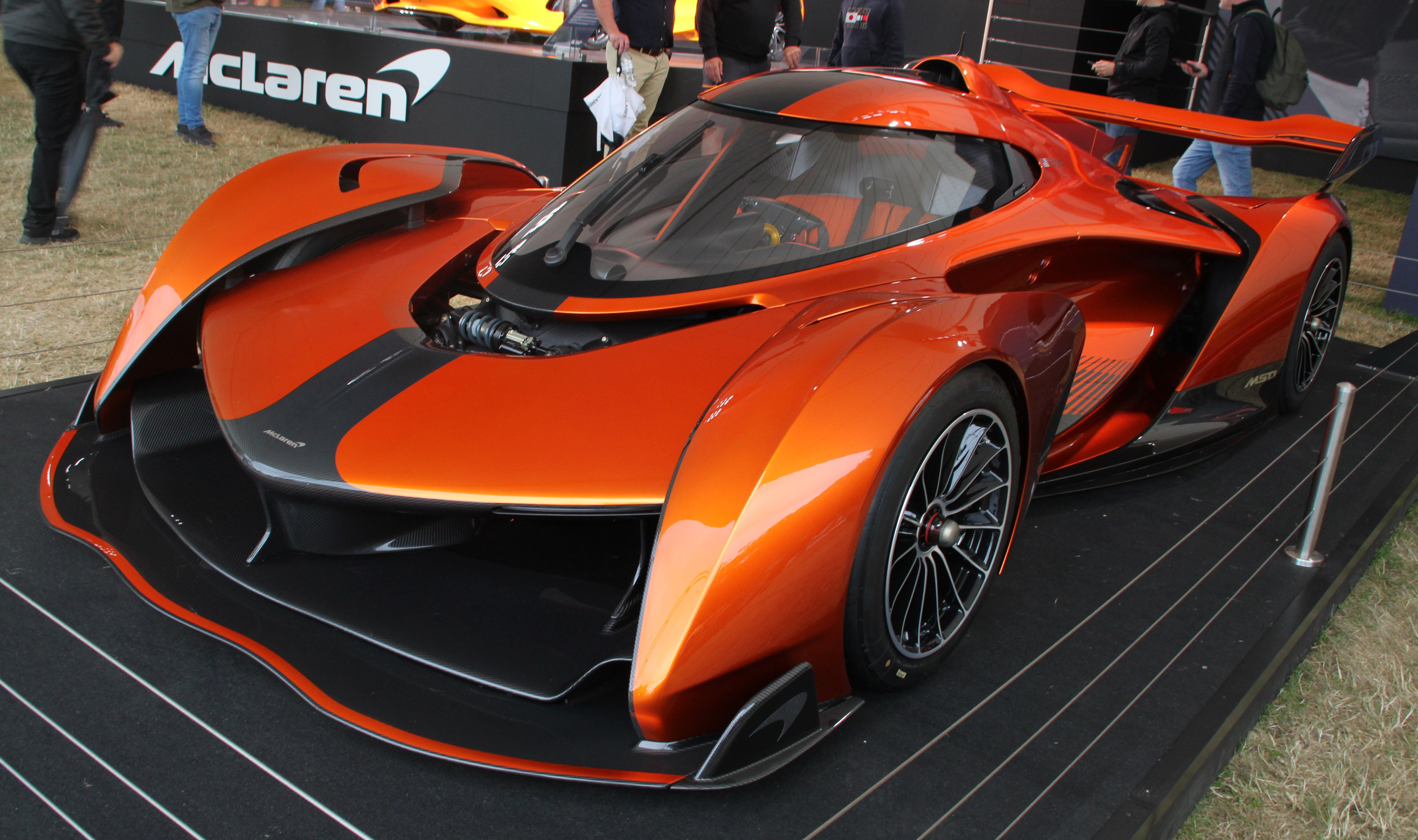

Overview
- Manufacturer: McLaren Automotive
- Model years: 2023 (25 units sold)
- Assembly: United Kingdom: Woking, Surrey, England
- Designer: Rob Melville

Body and chassis
- Class: Track day car
- Body style: Hatch-top coupé
- Layout: Rear mid-engine, rear-wheel-drive layout
- Doors: Canopy doors

Powertrain
- Engine: 5.2 L (317.3 cu in) Judd GV5-based naturally aspirated V10
- Power output: 840 PS (829 hp; 618 kW), 650 N⋅m (479 lb⋅ft)
- Transmission: 7-speed sequential

Dimensions
- Kerb weight: 1,000 kg (2,205 lb)

The McLaren Solus GT is a limited-production track-only mid-engined sports car manufactured by McLaren Automotive. The car is the sixth edition in the McLaren Ultimate Series, joining the McLaren F1, McLaren P1, McLaren Senna, McLaren Speedtail, and McLaren Elva. It is based on the 2017 Ultimate Vision Gran Turismo concept that appeared in the Sony Interactive Entertainment racing game Gran Turismo Sport. The car is designed to be an "extreme expression of track driving engagement", and is limited to 25 units, all of which come with a custom molded seat, FIA-homologated race suit, helmet, and a bespoke HANS (head and neck support device).

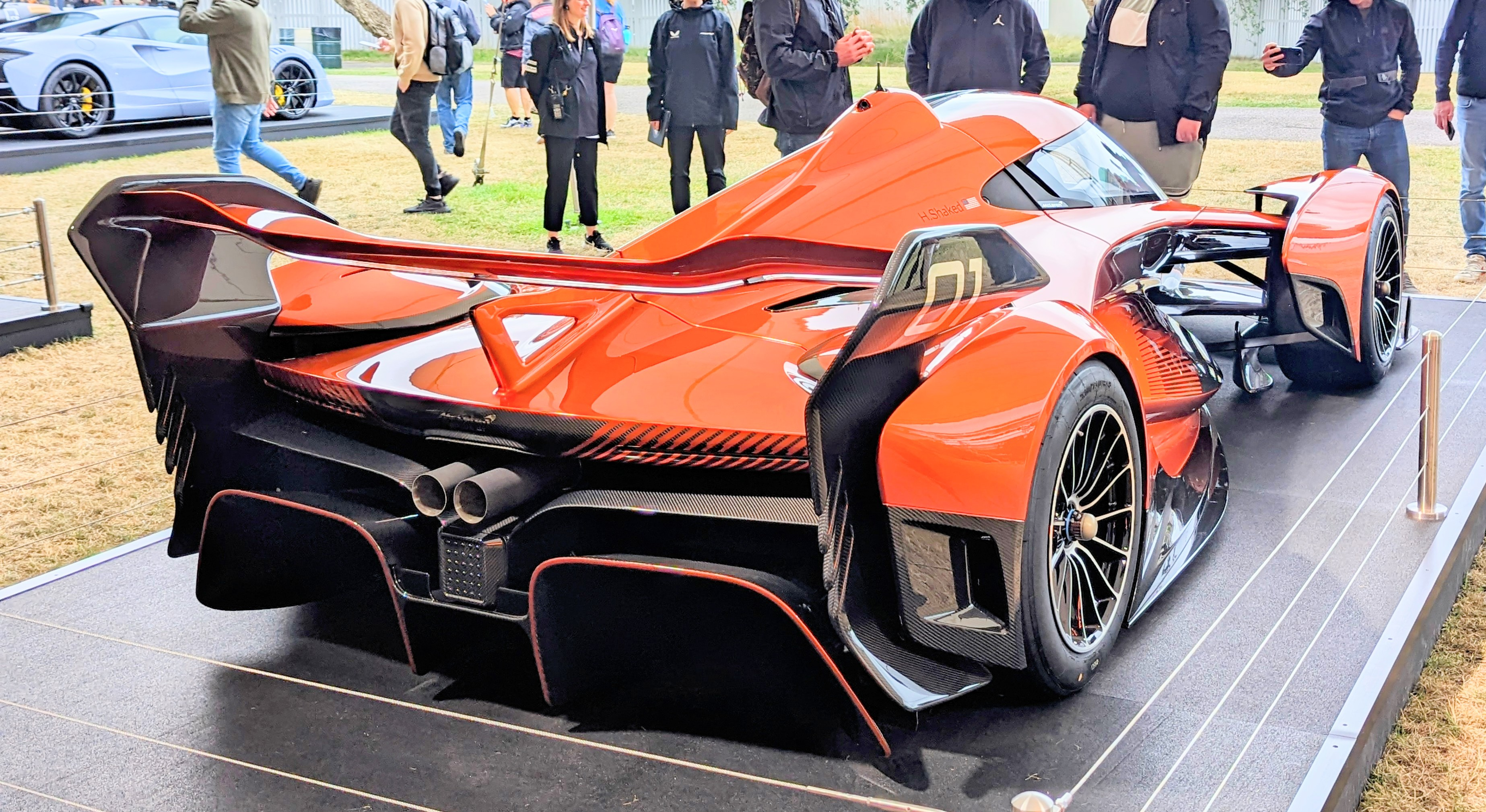
2023 McLaren Solus GT 4

== Specifications ==
=== Powertrain ===
The 5.2 L (320 cu in) V10 is a Judd-derived block, which McLaren claims produces in excess of 840 PS (829 hp; 618 kW) and 650 N⋅m (479 lb⋅ft) with a redline of 10,000 rpm. The engine has individual barrel-driven throttle bodies, with gear-driven camshafts, bespoke crank, intake and exhaust systems. Power is sent from the engine to the rear wheels via a Le Mans Prototype-spec 7-speed sequential gearbox, and McLaren claims that the car will do 0–100 km/h (0–62 mph) in 2.5 seconds, with a top speed in excess of 322 km/h (200 mph). The gearbox is of aluminium-magnesium construction and consists of straight-cut gears, with a carbon fibre clutch, and with the engine the two will act as stressed members.

=== Chassis ===
The chassis is a bespoke carbon fibre monocoque that incorporates numerous designs from Formula One, with 3D-printed titanium components used in the halo protecting the cockpit and roll bar, and carbon fibre crash structures similar to the ones found on Formula One cars. The car features double wishbone suspension with pushrod torsion bars at the front and pull-rod torsion bars at the rear, with four-way manually adjustable dampers. A sliding canopy on the roof of the car slides open to allow the driver to climb into the sole seat in the vehicle, similar in fashion to the Lamborghini Egoista.

=== Bodywork ===
The bodywork also has a unique design that borrows from the current Formula One cars that employ the ground effect. A large front splitter, Venturi tunnels integrated into the floor and a twin-element fixed rear wing all combine to give the car a claimed downforce figure of around 1,200 kg (2,646 lb) at its top speed.
