= McLaren Artura =

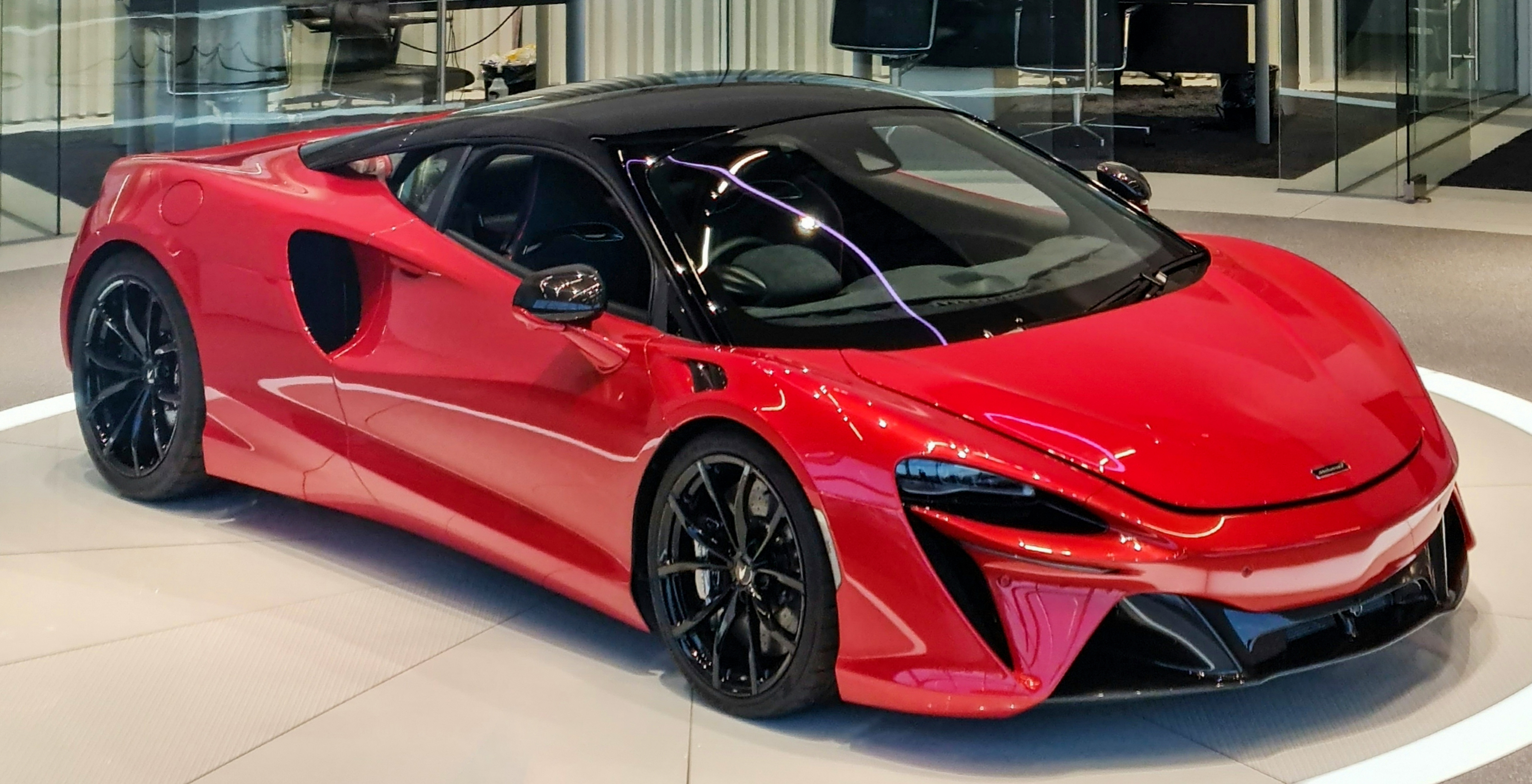

Overview
- Manufacturer: McLaren Automotive
- Production: 2022–present
- Model years: 2023–present
- Assembly: United Kingdom: Woking, Surrey, England
- Designer: Rob Melville

Body and chassis
- Class: Sports car (S)
- Body style: 2-door coupé 2-door roadster
- Layout: Rear mid-engine, rear-wheel drive
- Platform: MCLA (McLaren Carbon Lightweight Architecture)
- Doors: Dihedral

Powertrain
- Engine: 2,993 cc (182.6 cu in) M630 twin-turbocharged 120º V6
- Electric motor: Axial Flux E-Motor
- Power output: Engine: 585 PS (430 kW; 577 hp); Electric motors: 95 PS (70 kW; 94 hp); Combined: 680 PS (500 kW; 671 hp)
- Transmission: 8-speed SSG-Seamless Shift Gearbox dual-clutch + E-Reverse gear
- Hybrid drivetrain: PHEV
- Battery: 7.4 kWh Li-ion

Dimensions
- Wheelbase: 2,640 mm (103.9 in)
- Length: 4,539 mm (178.7 in)
- Width: 1,913 mm (75.3 in)
- Height: 1,193 mm (47.0 in)
- Kerb weight: 1,498 kg (3,302 lb) (Coupe) 1,560 kg (3,439 lb) (Spider)

Chronology
- Predecessor: McLaren 570S

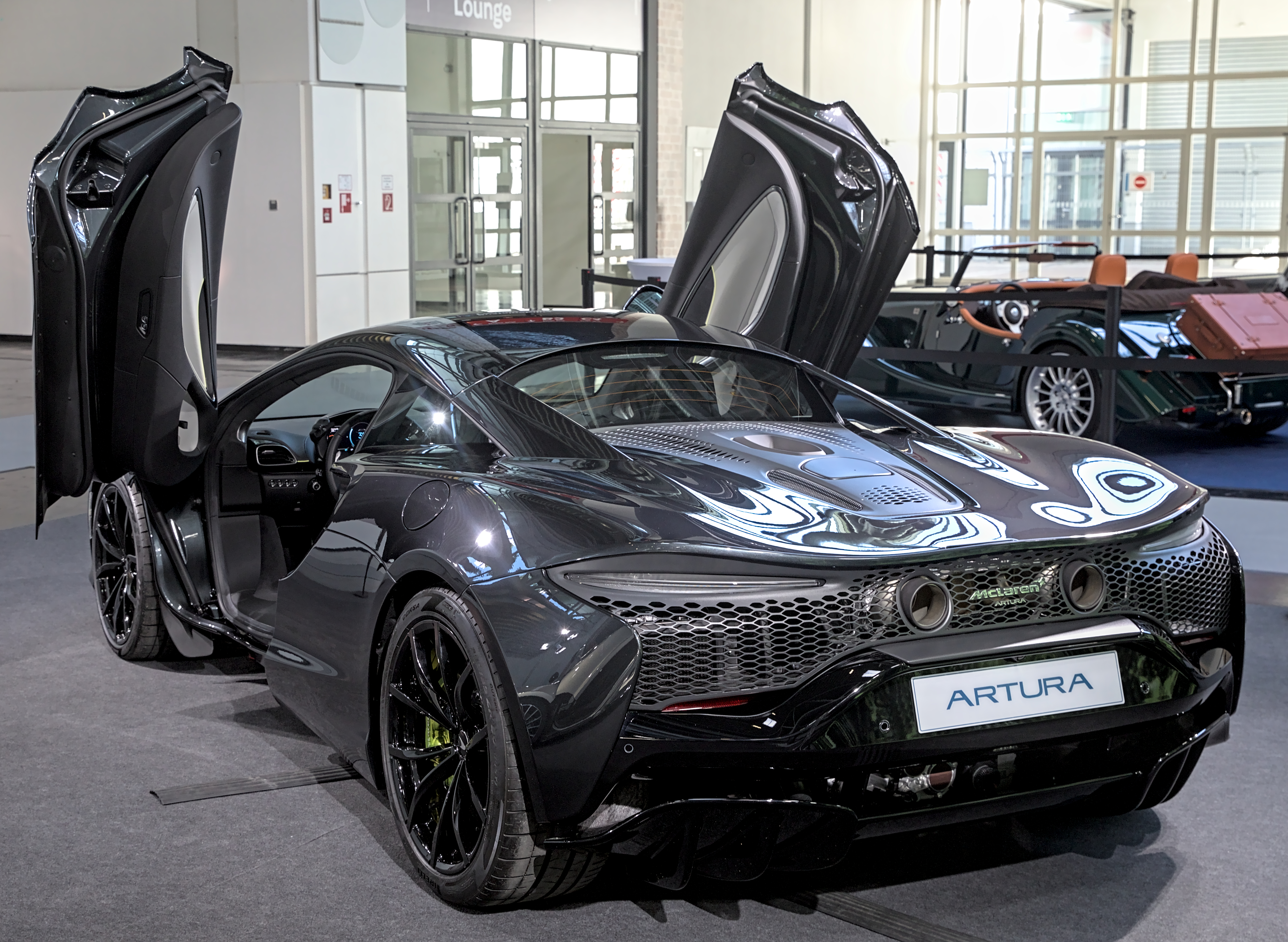
Artura's rear

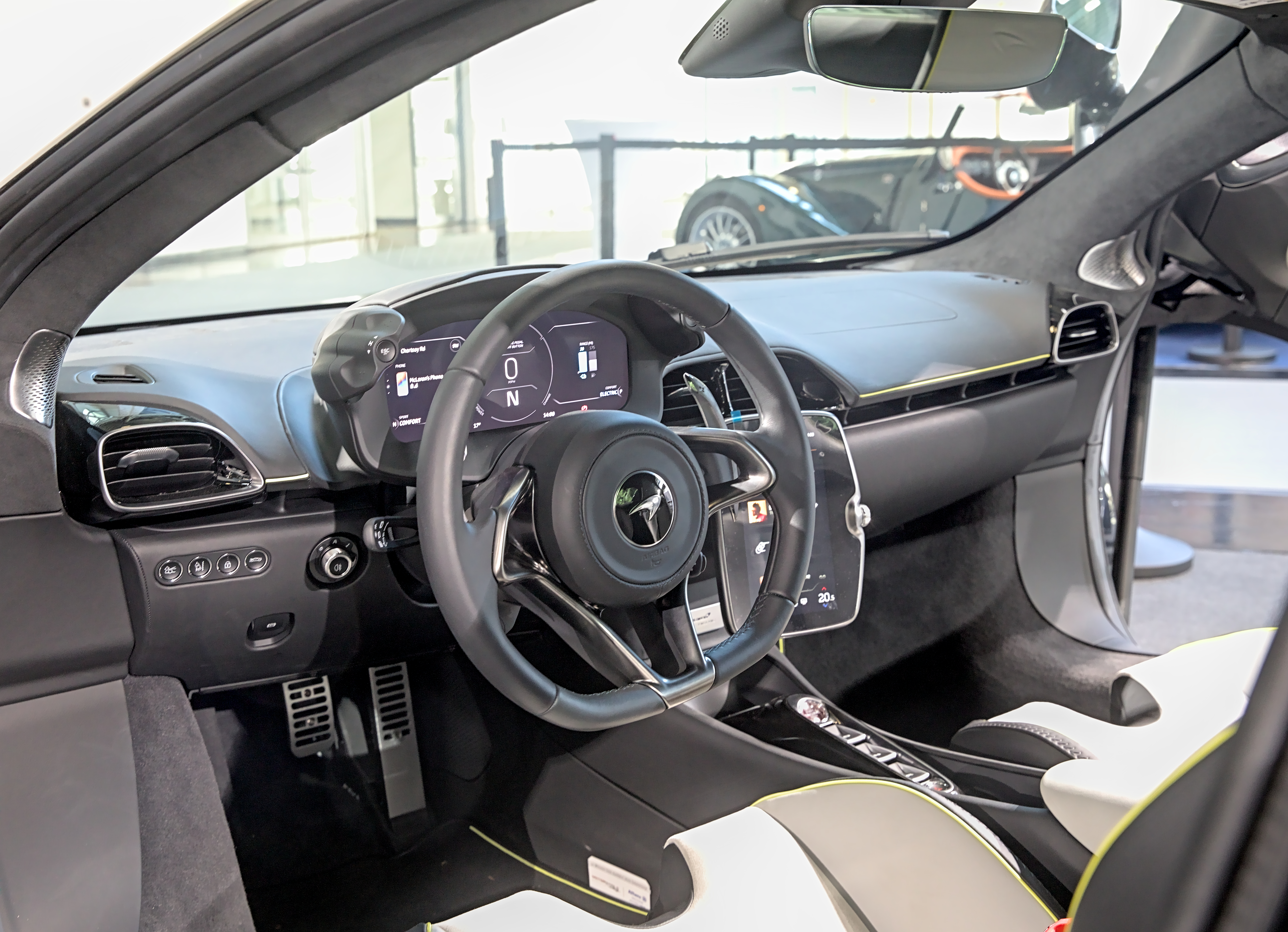
Interior

The McLaren Artura is a hybrid electric sports car designed and manufactured by the British car manufacturer McLaren Automotive since 2022. It is the third hybrid by the company since the P1 and Speedtail, and the first with a V6 engine.

The name Artura was announced on 23 November 2020. It is a combination of the words art and future. It inaugurates a new carbon fibre chassis called MCLA (McLaren Carbon Lightweight Architecture).

== Specifications ==
=== Engine ===
The Artura uses an all-new 2,993 cc (3.0 L; 182.6 cu in) twin-turbocharged V6 engine paired with an electric motor to produce a combined output of 500 kW (680 PS; 671 hp) at 7,500 rpm and 720 N⋅m (531 lb⋅ft) of torque at 2,250 rpm. On its own, the engine produces 430 kW (585 PS; 577 hp) and 584 N⋅m (431 lb⋅ft) of torque. The all-aluminium engine has a bank angle of 120 degrees, a world first for a production V6 engine. This is to accommodate a hot-vee layout, where the two turbochargers are placed in the vee of the engine. Power is sent to the rear wheels through an all-new 8 speed dual-clutch transmission. Redline is at 8,500 rpm.

=== Electric motor ===
The electric motor used in the Artura produces 70 kW (95 PS) and 225 N⋅m (166 ft⋅lb) of torque. The combined torque peak is less than the sum of both sides as the output is limited to "optimize powertrain drivability characteristics". The 7.4 kilowatt-hours (27 MJ) lithium-ion battery pack weighs 88 kg (194 lb) and is positioned under the rear of the passenger compartment. McLaren claims a 2.5-hour time for an 80 percent charge using an EVSE cable and a 31 km (19 mi) electric range under European testing methodology. This motor replaces the reverse gear, similar to the Ferrari SF90 Stradale. The total mass of all electrical components is 130 kg (287 lb), which means that the Artura has a kerb weight only 46 kg (102 lb) more than that of its predecessor, the McLaren 570S. The Artura has a range of 30.6 km (19 miles) on electric-only mode.

=== Performance ===
According to McLaren, the Artura can accelerate to 100 km/h (62 mph) in 2.9 seconds, to 200 km/h (124 mph) in 8.3 seconds, can achieve a maximum speed of 330 km/h (205 mph), and has a 1/4 mile (402 m) time of 10.7 seconds.

=== Chassis and handling dynamics ===
The McLaren Artura represents a notable shift in the brand's approach to chassis dynamics with the introduction of an electronic differential (e-diff), a first for a modern McLaren. In previous models, McLaren relied on an open differential, using the braking system to manage torque distribution between the rear wheels through selective brake application.

Alongside the e-diff, the Artura features a new multi-link rear suspension system. This suspension design increases toe stiffness by 75%, a change that significantly improves rear-end stability.

== Marketing ==
The Artura appeared prominently on the sixth episode of the third season of the Netflix-produced series Emily in Paris.

The Artura was advertised on the McLaren MCL35M and MCL36 during the 2021 and 2022 Formula One seasons.

== Motorsport ==
=== GT4 ===
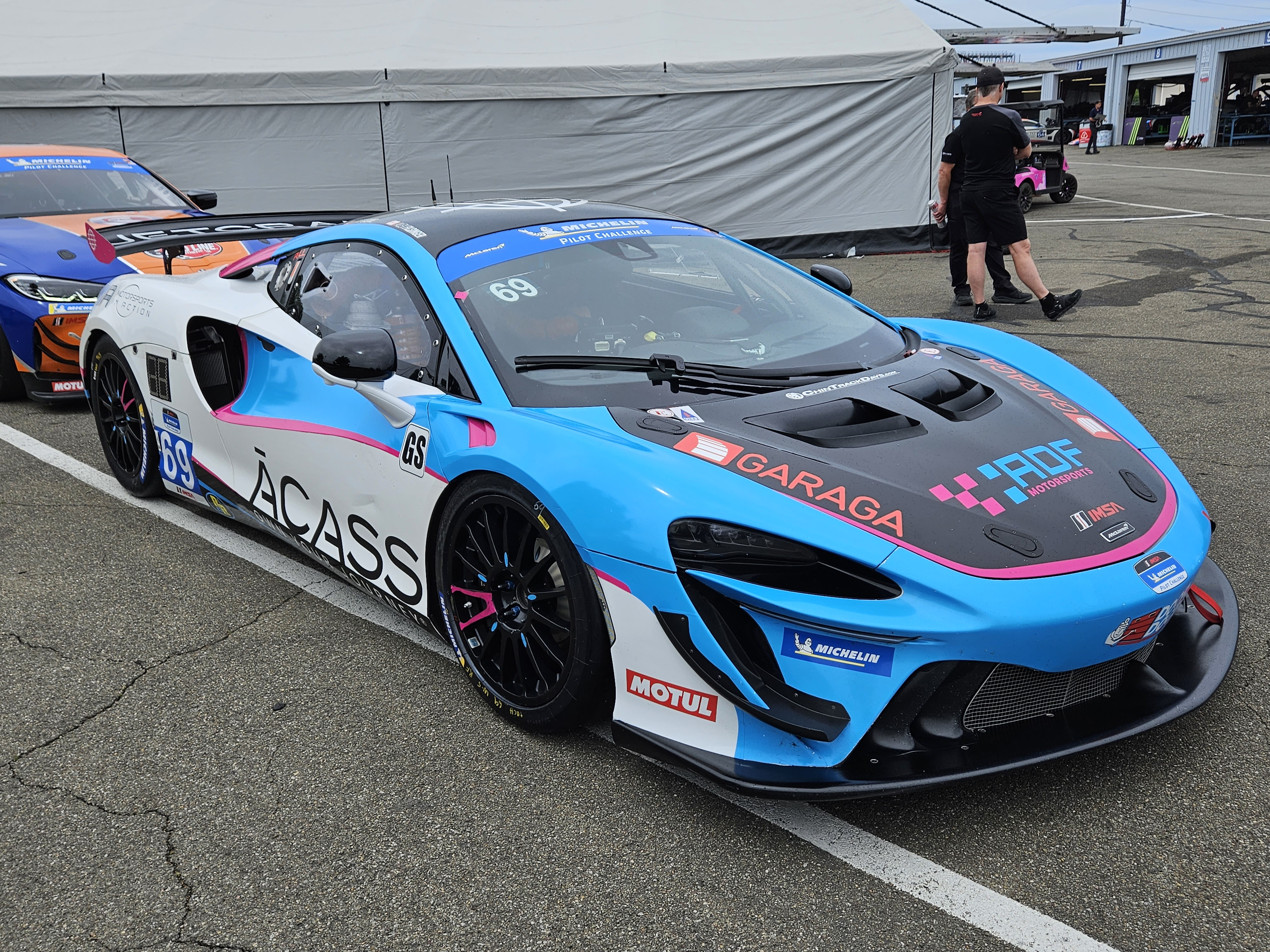
McLaren Artura GT4

In June 2022, McLaren unveiled the Artura GT4, the successor to the McLaren 570S GT4 in the GT4 category. The car features the same twin-turbocharged V6 engine as the road car, but without a hybrid system as this is not permitted by the GT4 regulations. The car made its racing debut in the 2023 Michelin Pilot Challenge at Daytona.

=== Trophy ===
Alongside the GT4 version of the Artura, McLaren also released the McLaren Artura Trophy. This is an unrestricted version of the GT4 car, created for the McLaren Trophy. The McLaren Trophy is a one-make McLaren racing series that started in 2023. Owners of the Trophy car can also swap the Aero, adjust the engine management and add ballast to race their car in GT4 competition.
