= McLaren 720S =

Sports car

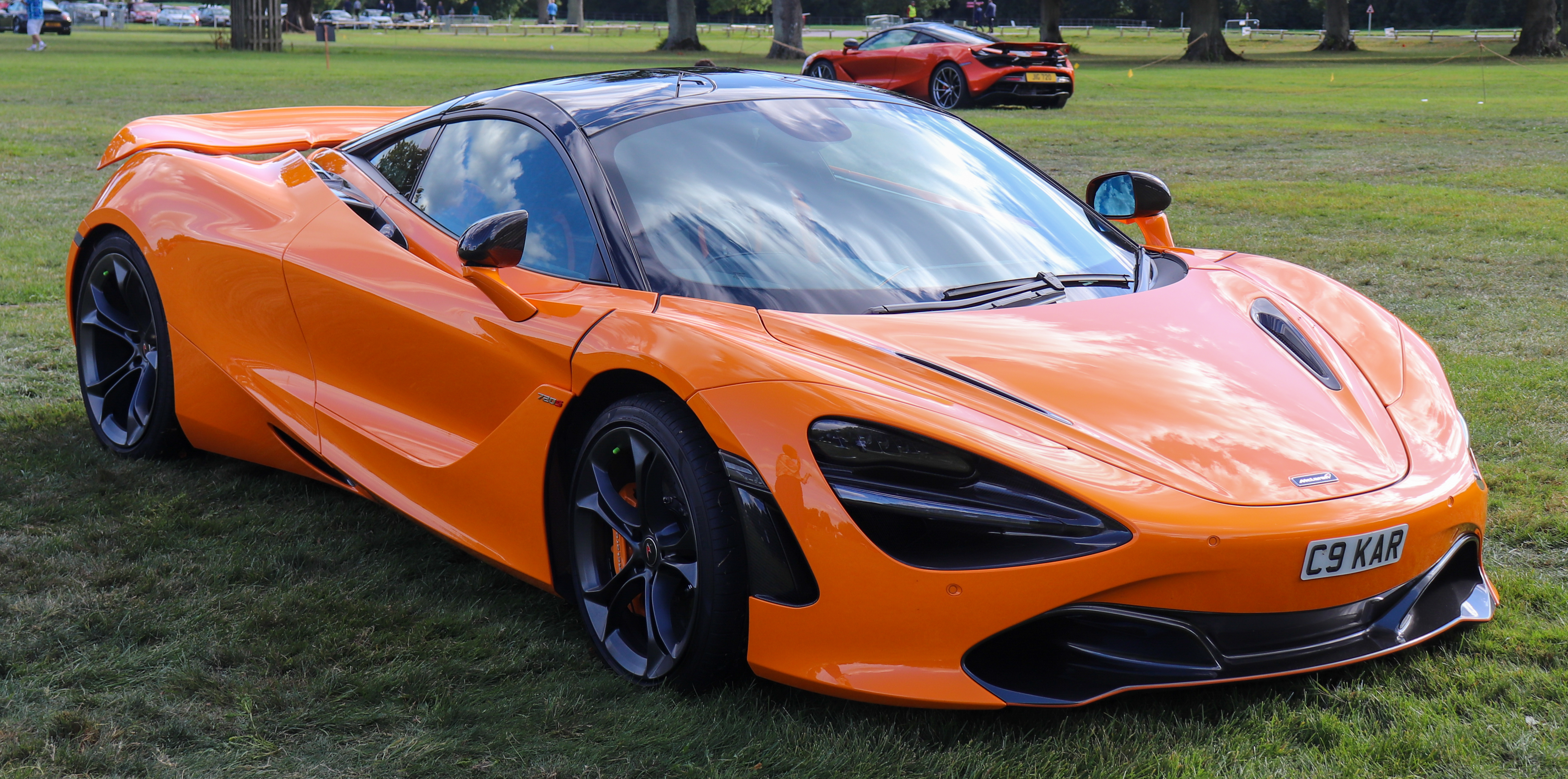

Overview
- Manufacturer: McLaren Automotive
- Production: 2017–2023 (720S); 2023–present (750S)
- Assembly: United Kingdom: Woking, Surrey, England
- Designer: Frank Stephenson; Rob Melville

Body and chassis
- Class: Sports car (S)
- Body style: 2-door coupé; 2-door retractable hard-top convertible (Spider)
- Layout: Rear mid-engine, rear-wheel drive
- Platform: MonoCage II carbon fibre monocoque
- Doors: Butterfly doors
- Related: McLaren Senna; McLaren Speedtail; McLaren GT; McLaren Elva

Powertrain
- Engine: 4.0 L M840T twin-turbocharged V8
- Power output: 720 PS (530 kW; 710 hp) @ 7,500 rpm 770 newton-metres (570 lbf⋅ft) @ 5,500 rpm
- Transmission: 7-speed Graziano dual-clutch

Dimensions
- Wheelbase: 2,670 mm (105.1 in)
- Length: 4,544 mm (178.9 in)
- Width: 2,161 mm (85.1 in)
- Height: 1,196 mm (47.1 in)
- Kerb weight: 3,128 lb (1,419 kg) (720S Coupé); 3,236 lb (1,468 kg) (720S Spider)

Chronology
- Predecessor: McLaren 650S
- Successor: McLaren 750S

The McLaren 720S is a sports car designed and manufactured by British automobile manufacturer McLaren Automotive. It is the second all-new car in the McLaren Super Series, replacing the 650S beginning in May 2017.

The 720S was launched at the Geneva Motor Show on 7 March 2017 and is built on a modified carbon monocoque, which is lighter and stiffer than the previous model, the 650S.

== Specifications ==
The 720S is the first all-new car to be introduced by McLaren as a part of its new plan to launch 15 new cars into the market by 2022. According to McLaren, the 720S is 91% new as compared to its predecessor.

=== Engine ===
The 720S features McLaren's new M840T engine, which is an evolution of the M838T used in the 650S. It is a 3,994 cc (4.0 L; 243.7 cu in) twin-turbocharged V8 engine. The engine has a rated power output of 720 PS (530 kW; 710 hp) at 7,500 rpm, giving the car its name; the maximum torque is 568 lb⋅ft (770 N⋅m) at 5,500 rpm.

=== Suspension ===
The Pro-active Chassis Control II active suspension system used in the 720S is an evolution of the system used in the 650S but is 16 kg (35 lb) lighter than the previous version. The new system features accelerometers on the top and pressure sensors at the bottom of the dampers to precisely communicate to the car's onboard computer the driving conditions in real-time for optimum suspension settings. The system uses findings from a PhD course at the University of Cambridge.

=== Chassis ===
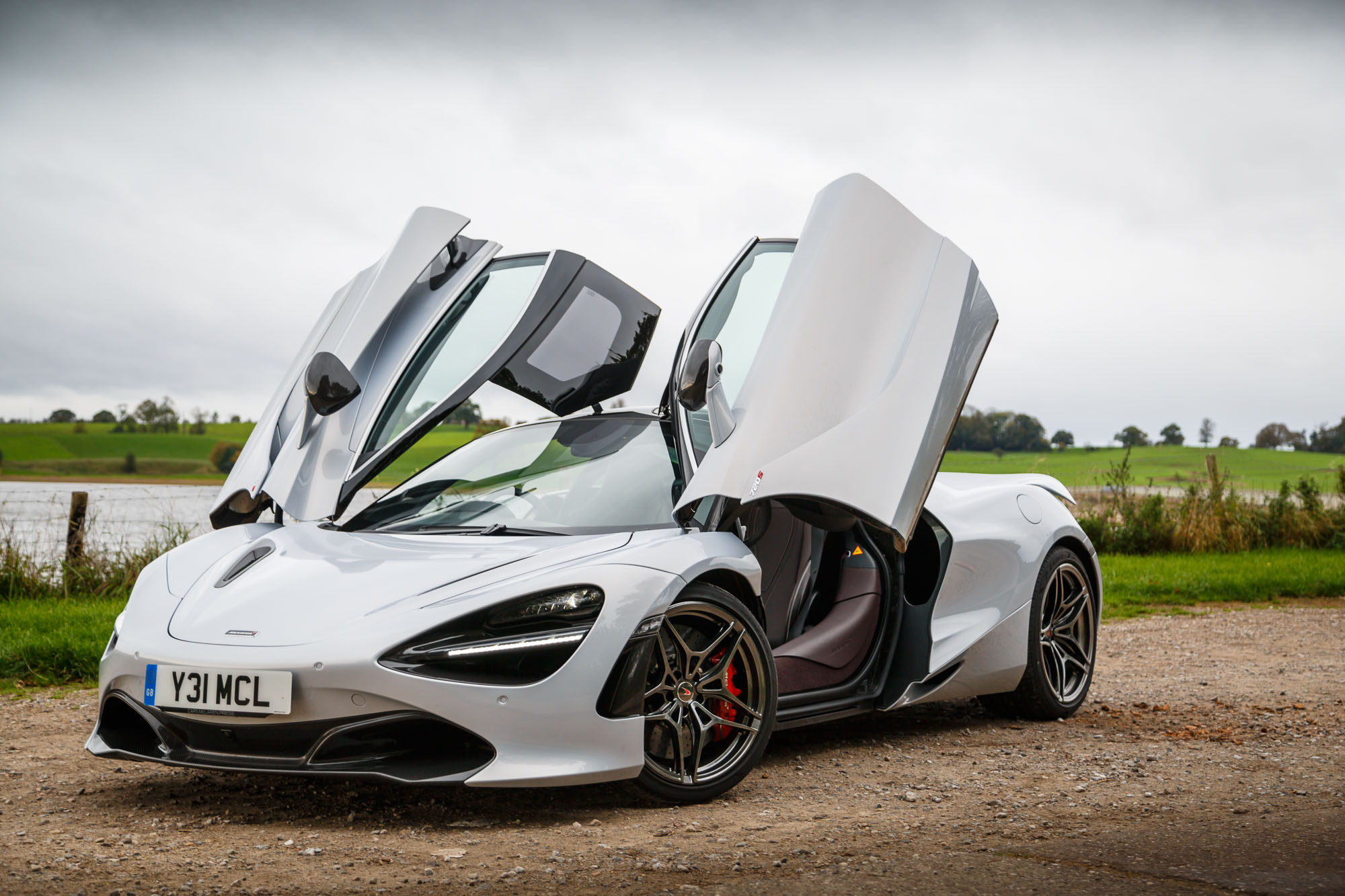
The doors in the open position

The carbon fibre tub used in the 720S' chassis is based on the similar principle of the MonoCage unit in the P1 but is 18 kg (40 lb) lighter than its predecessor. Called the MonoCage II, the tub allows for dihedral doors with large cutouts for easier entry and exit. It also reduces the size of the pillars of the roof, improving visibility for the driver. The same tub underpins the Senna, Speedtail and the Elva sports cars.

=== Interior ===
The interior is designed to be a blend of modern and race-inspired elements as well. Alcantara and Weir leather upholstery along with carbon fibre trim is standard. A Bowers and Wilkins audio system and fixed carbon fibre racing seats are included as an option. The main focus of the interior is the driver and this is reflected by the new digital display behind the steering wheel which retracts to a thin screen to reveal vital information to the driver when the car is in track mode. The touch screen on the center console is angled towards the driver, and vital controls are designed to be in the driver's easy reach. The car comes with three driving modes: track, sport, and comfort with the first focusing on an enhanced track driving experience.

=== Performance ===
According to McLaren the 720S can accelerate to 97 km/h (60 mph) in 2.9 seconds, to 200 km/h (124 mph) in 7.8 seconds, can achieve a maximum speed of 341 km/h (212 mph), and has a 1/4 mile (402 m) time of 10.3 seconds. A stock 720S completed the 1/4 mile (402 m) in 9.9 seconds, 0–97 km/h (0–60 mph) in 2.5 seconds, and 0–200 km/h (0–124 mph) in 7.1 seconds. The 720S also comes with Variable Drift Mode, which manipulates the stability control to help drift the car.

=== Efficiency ===
McLaren claims class-leading efficiency for the new 720S, with CO_{2} emissions of 249 g/km and combined fuel economy of 26.4 mpg_{‑imp} (22.0 mpg_{‑US}; 10.7 L/100 km)—both of these figures represent an improvement of around 10% from the previous 650S.

== Design ==
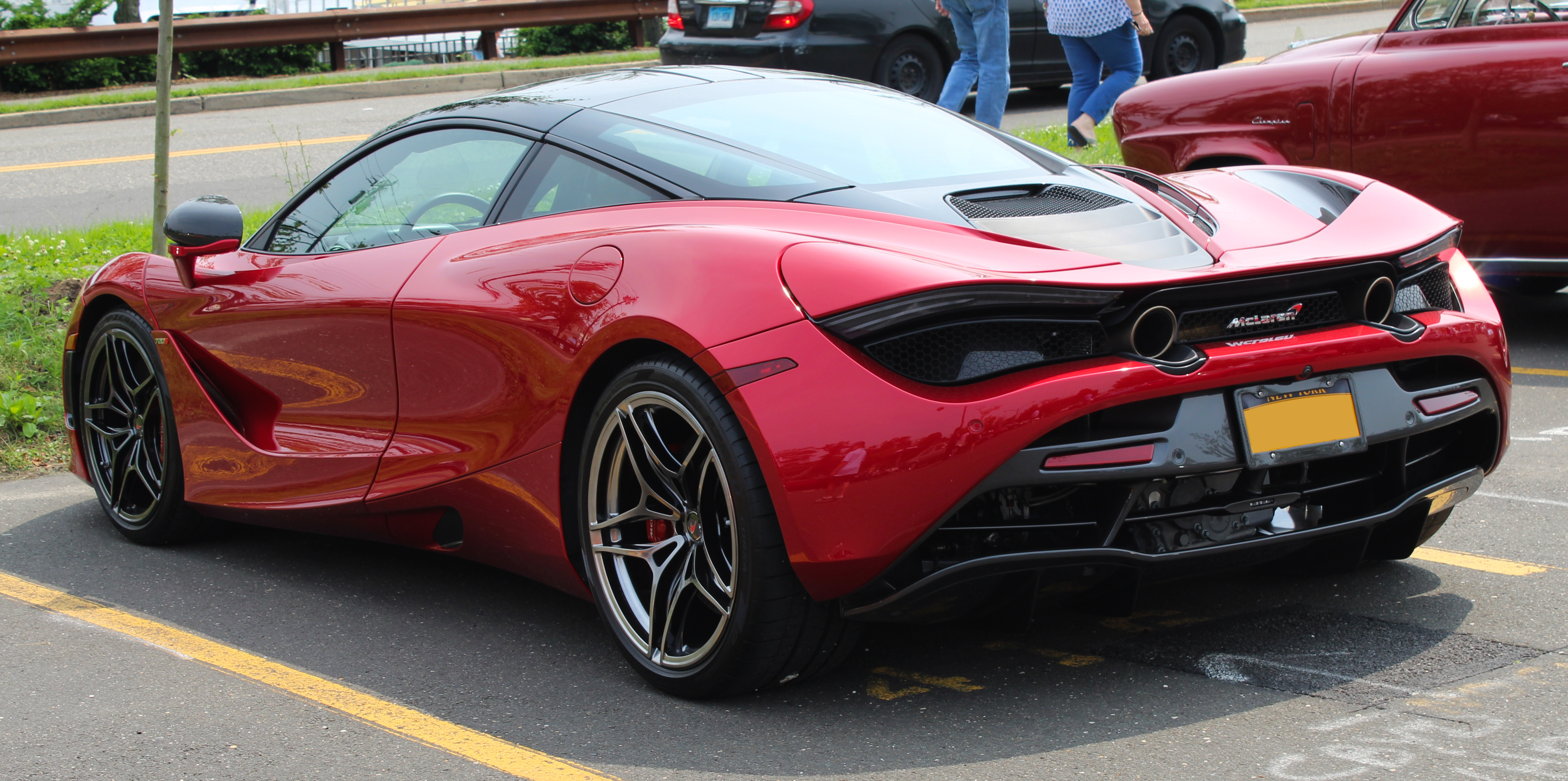
Rear view

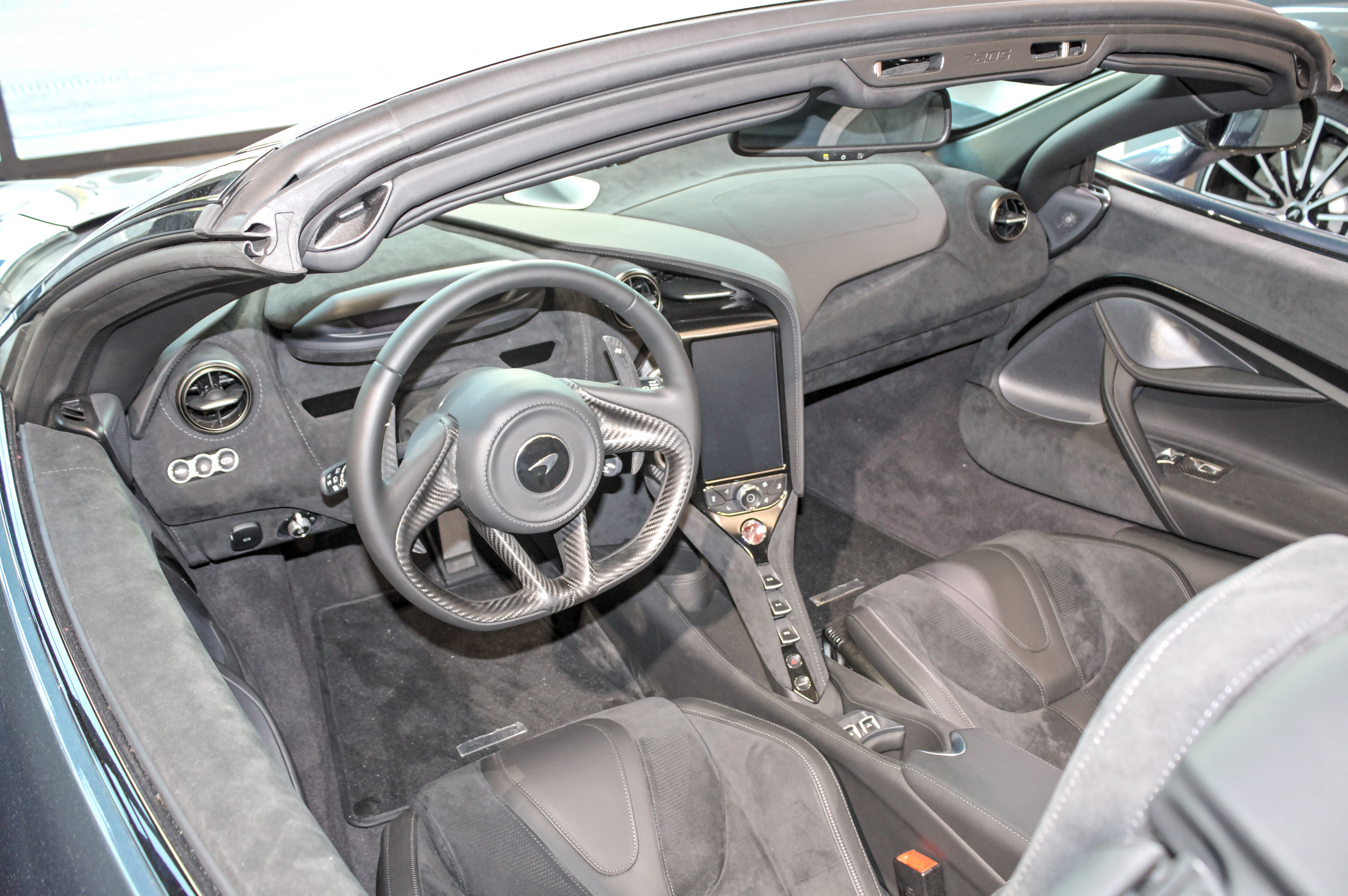
Interior

The 720S features twin-hinged butterfly doors and many design features from the McLaren F1. The headlights hide air vents that funnel incoming air to two small radiators in front of the wheels. The doors feature air channels that direct air to the engine. The rear of the car features thin LED taillights similar to those on the McLaren P1, and two round exhaust pipes. The design was inspired by the great white shark and features a teardrop-shaped cockpit. All of the exterior features result in an improvement of 50% more downforce than the 650S. The interior of the car includes a folding driver display and carbon fibre accents.

== Variants ==
=== 720S (2017–2023) ===
The vehicle was unveiled in the 2017 Geneva International Motor Show.

The vehicle went on sale on 7 March 2017, with deliveries to customers starting in May 2017.

The vehicle was replaced by the 750S in 2023.

=== 720S Spider (2018–2023) ===
The 720S Spider was introduced in December 2018 as the brand's new open-top flagship sports car. Due to the integral roll structure of the monocoque used in the 720S, the Spider did not need additional bracing to compensate for the loss of a fixed roof. The modified monocoque loses the spine running from front to the rear of the car and is dubbed the Monocage II-S. Due to the loss of the roof, the 720S Spider uses traditional dihedral doors. The Spider weighs 45 kg (100 lb) more than its coupé counterpart due to the retractable hardtop system. The Spider marks the debut of new 10-spoke alloy wheels and new exterior colour options.

The roof is a single piece of carbon fibre and takes 11 seconds for operation, 6 seconds quicker than the 650S Spider. The roof can be operated at speeds up to 50 km/h (31 mph). The Spider uses the "flying buttress" as used on all convertible McLaren models. There is an added window on the buttress of the car to increase rear visibility. The retractable window between the roll-over hoops is carried over from the 650S Spider.

The engine and the transmission remain the same as the coupé with the engine generating the same amount of power. The Spider can accelerate to 97 km/h (60 mph) from a standstill in 2.9 seconds, to 193 km/h (120 mph) in 7.9 seconds and on to a top speed of 341 km/h (212 mph) with the top closed. The top speed reduces by 16 km/h (10 mph) with the top retracted.

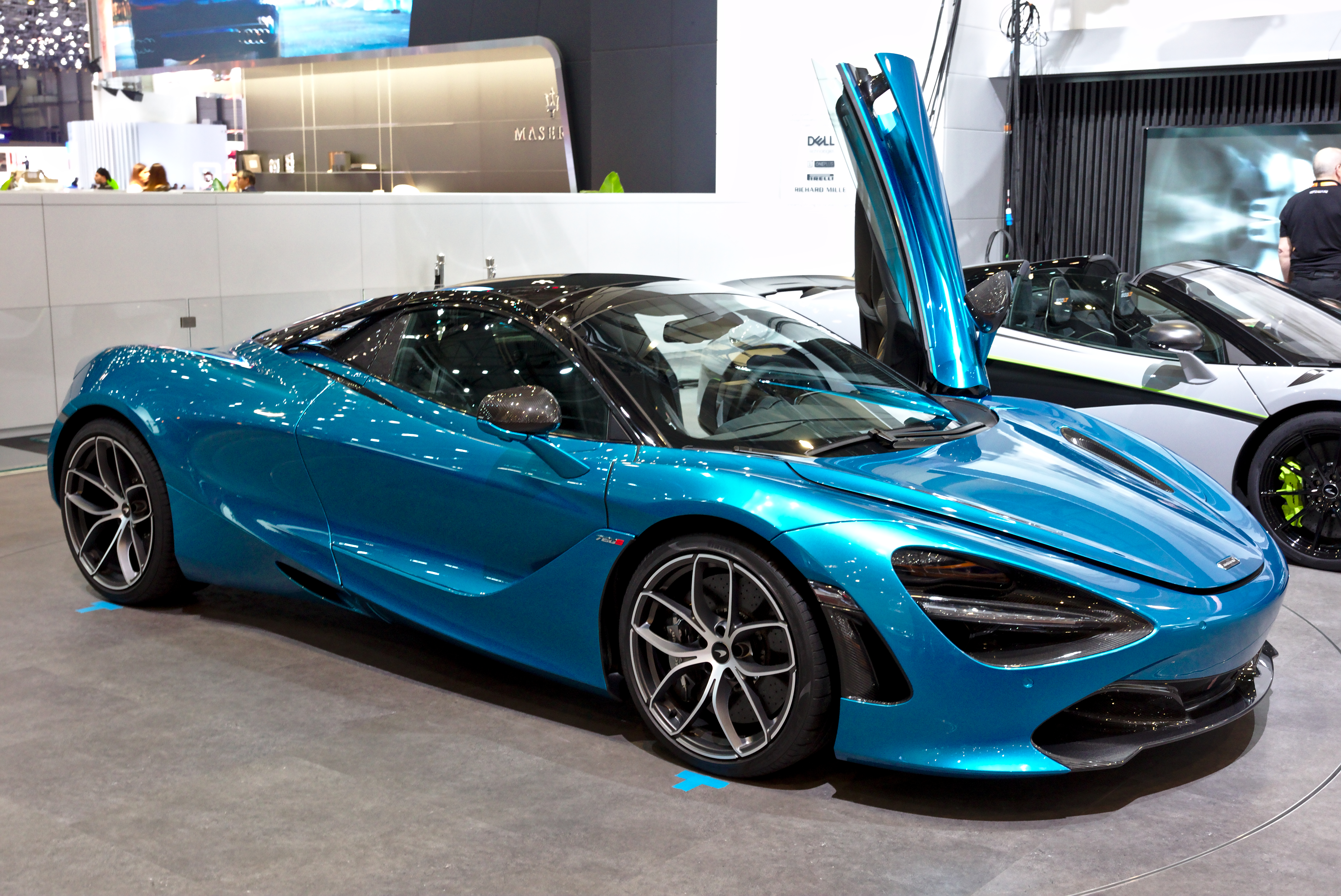
McLaren 720S Spider at the 2019 Geneva Motor Show

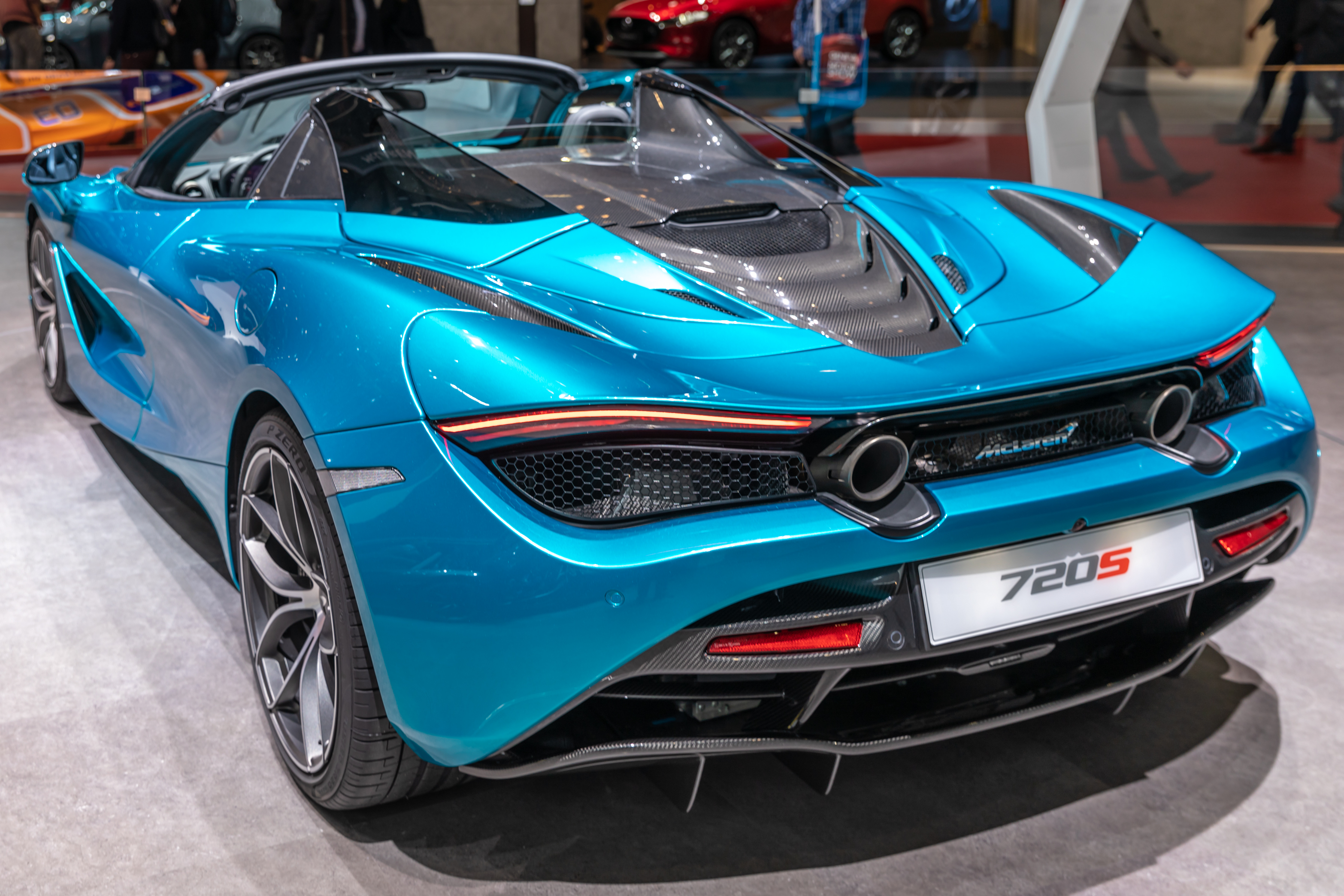
Rear view

=== 720S MSO Apex Collection (2019–2023) ===
Based on the 720S Coupé, McLaren launched a total of 15 Apex Collection cars in five different designs. The name refers to the apex of a corner, the clipping point of a corner when following the racing line. On the exterior, the presentation vehicles show either white or red paintwork and thus reproduce the typical colors of curbs in the group photos when they are parked next to each other. The press release leaves it open whether other paint colors are also available for the special edition. The inscription ‘Apex Collection’ in front of the rear wheels refers to it. Air intakes, exterior mirrors and the active rear spoiler are made of visible carbon fibre. They also feature ultra-light forged ten-spoke rims and a sports exhaus..

The driver and front passenger sit in the well-formed carbon racing seats. As the otherwise optional Track Pack is standard on the MSO Apex Collection, there is a titanium rollbar behind the seats including belt attachment points for six-point harnesses, which provide much more support on the racetrack. The infotainment system includes the McLaren Track Telemetry system (MTT), which allows drivers to keep track of their lap times. In addition, three cameras record vehicle and driver movements to provide the most focused analysis of drives on closed circuits as possible, helping to improve driver skills. From the MSO accessory range, the Apex Collection cars receive extended carbon shift paddles, an Alcantara steering wheel with color-contrasting 12 o’clock mark, a special accelerator pedal and an MSO key cap.

As soon as the doors are opened, an inscription in the carbon sills refer to one of the five different design themes.

- Apex Great Britain – 110 mph (the speed of 110 mph is reached by the 720S in Silverstone's Abbey Corner)
- Apex Germany – 85 mph (the speed of 85 mph is reached by the 720S in the Mobil 1 corner in Hockenheim)
- Apex France – 104 mph (the speed of 104 mph is reached by the 720S in the Signes-Kurve at Circuit Paul Ricard)
- Apex Belgium – 103 mph (the speed of 103 mph is reached by the 720S in Eau Rouges at Spa-Francorchamps)
- Apex Italy – 90 mph (the speed of 90 mph is reached by the 720S in the Ascari chicane in Monza)

These speeds were reached by professional factory test drivers at the apex of each of the corners mentioned. The Apex Great Britain was built in two left- and right-hand drive cars each, while the Apex Germany, Apex France, Apex Belgium and Apex Italy editions were available in one right- and two left-hand drive cars each. First deliveries were expected for October 2019. In the UK, the price per unit is £288,813. Each owner also received a VIP pass for a Formula 1 race including access to the paddock.

=== 765LT (2020–2023) ===
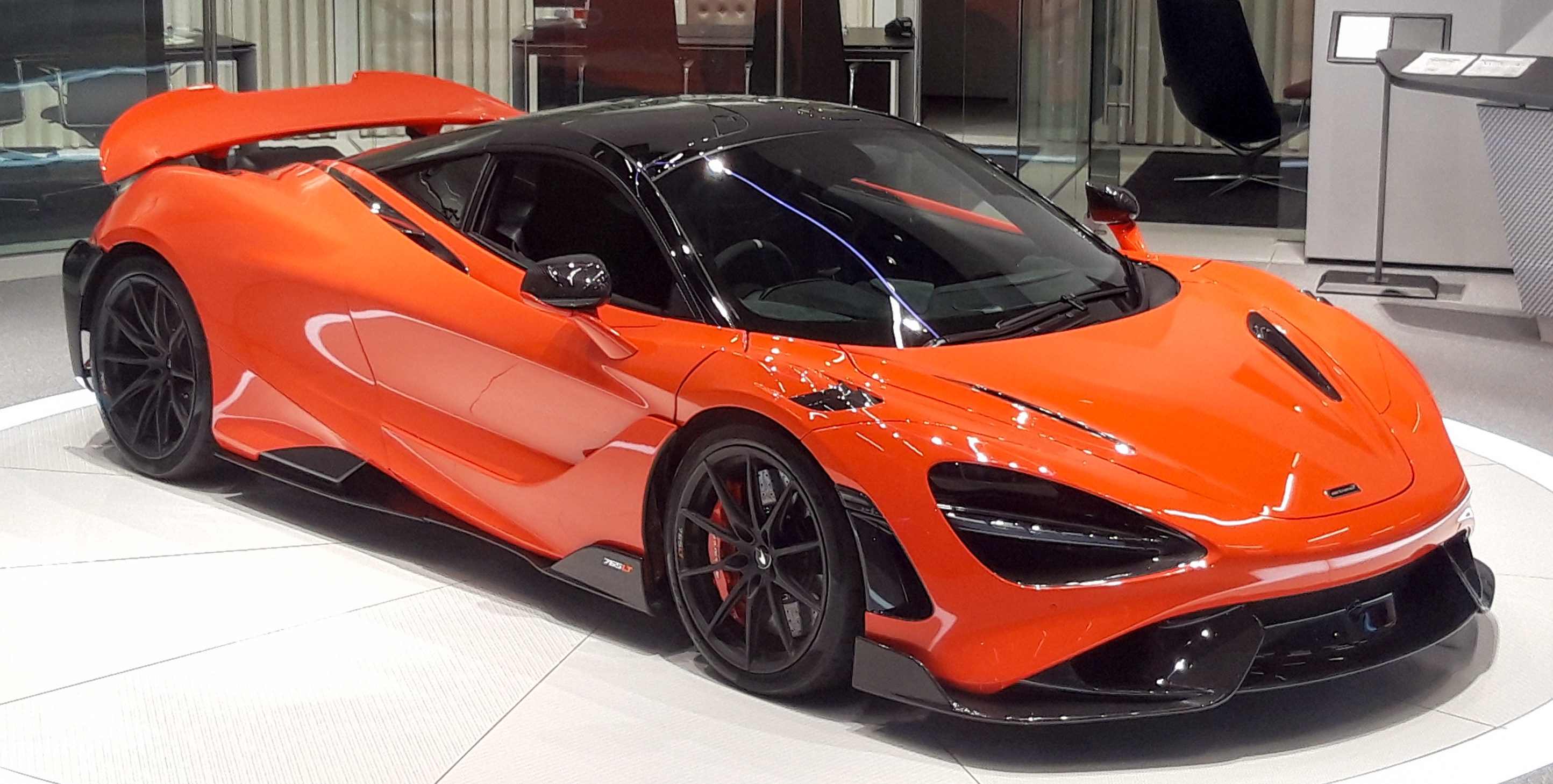
McLaren 765LT

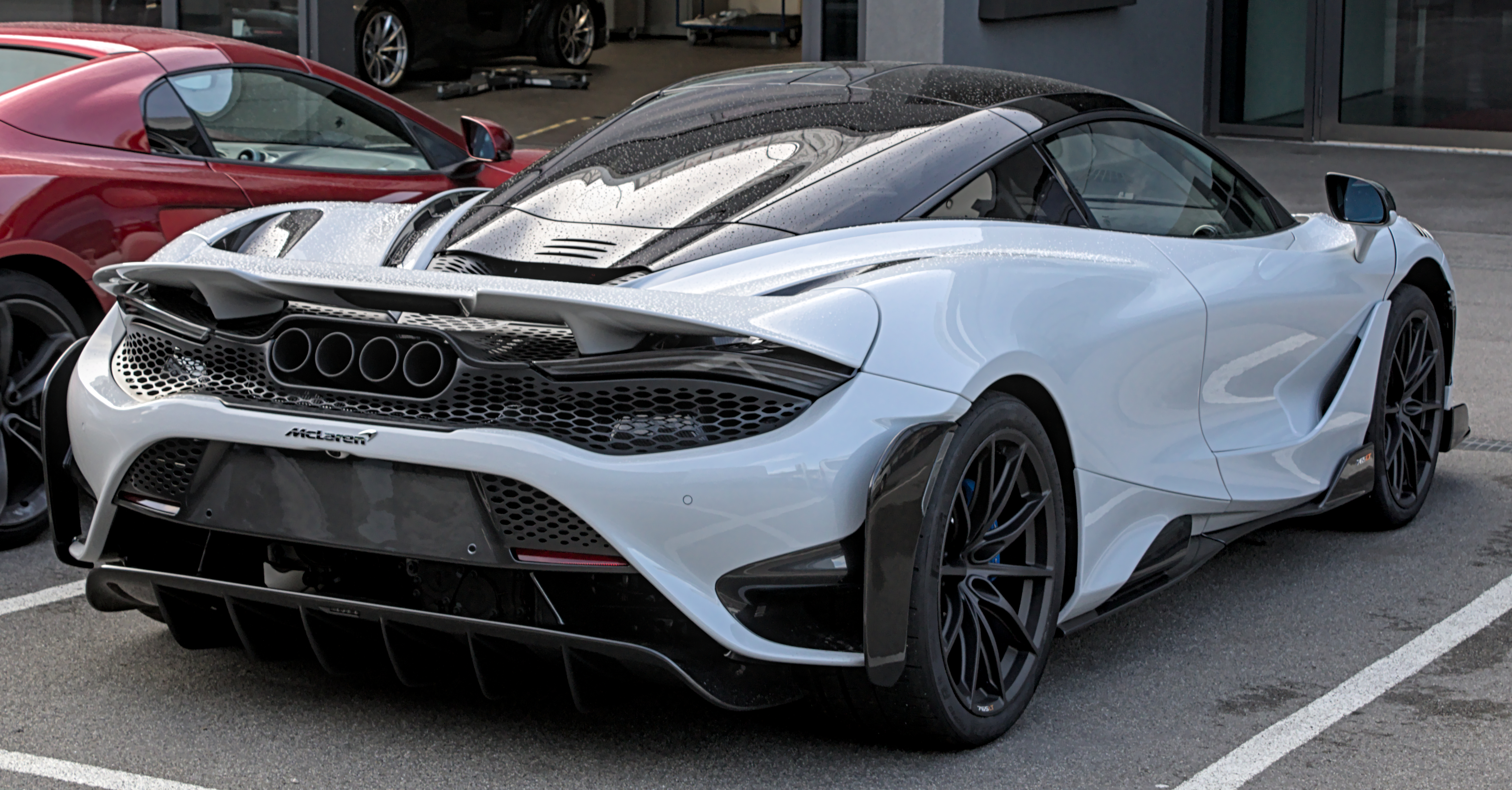
Rear

Unveiled on 3 March 2020, the 765LT is a limited (765 units worldwide) version of the 720S and the successor to the 675LT as a Super Series Longtail car, focused on track performance. The M840T engine is now rated at 765 PS (563 kW; 755 hp) at 7,500 rpm and 590 lb⋅ft (800 N⋅m) of torque at 5,500 rpm achieved with a higher-capacity fuel pump, forged aluminium pistons and a three-layer head gasket from the Senna.

The top speed is lowered from the 720S's 341 km/h (212 mph) to 330 km/h (205 mph) due to added drag created by the added high downforce parts, although the 765LT weighs 80 kg (176 lb) less than the 720S at 1,339 kg (2,952 lb) in its lightest configuration and has a quicker 0–100 km/h (0–62 mph) time of 2.8 seconds. It also can hit 0–200 km/h (0–124 mph) in 7.0 seconds and complete a quarter-mile dash in 9.9 seconds according to McLaren. A US-spec McLaren 765LT was tested by Road & Track with a quarter-mile time of 11.6 seconds at 131.1 mph (211.0 km/h), which equates to 0–100 km/h in the high-3 range and 0–200 km/h in the mid-10 range. In addition, it stopped at 92 feet from 60-0 mph. Other testing sources such as DragTimes have recorded quarter mile times as low as 9.33 seconds at 150.87 mph (242.8 km/h) on a drag strip.

The Senna's brake calipers are also available as an extra-cost option; McLaren claims these have four times the thermal conductivity as conventional carbon ceramics, while Pirelli Trofeo R tyres are standard. Suspension changes involve a 5 mm (0.2 in) reduction in ride height and the use of lightweight main springs with secondary "helper" units as well as an upgraded Proactive Chassis Control system. The aerodynamics are redesigned to produce 25% more downforce than the 720S, featuring front fender vents, a larger front splitter and a longer active wing element at the rear at the cost of less noise insulation, thinner-gauge glass and stiffened engine mounts. The rear of the car also features a quad-exit full titanium exhaust to distinguish it from the 720S. Production was limited to 765 cars globally with customer deliveries in October 2020.

=== 720S Le Mans special edition (2020–2023) ===
It is a version of the 720S coupé celebrating the 25th anniversary of the McLaren F1 GTR #59's 1995 24 Hours of Le Mans race win. It includes:

- Choice of two body colours (McLaren Orange, Sarthe Grey)
- VIN starting with 298 (the number of laps completed by the original race car)
- 'Ueno Grey'-painted body side lower, rear bumper and front bumper lower
- 'McLaren 25 anniversary Le Mans' logo on lower body side panel
- Gloss black roof scoop with polycarbonate rear glazing
- Carbon fibre louvred front fenders
- Unique 5-spoke LM wheels that based on the design of the #59 F1 GTR wheels, with 'Le Mans' etching
- Gold-coloured brake calipers
- Gloss black contrast body components
- Choice of two black Alcantara themes with accents in McLaren Orange or Dove Grey
- Carbon fibre racing seats
- Embroidered headrests with 'McLaren 25 anniversary Le Mans' logo
- 12 o'clock steering wheel marker, linked to interior accent colour
- Dedication plate with 'McLaren 25 anniversary Le Mans' logo
- Floor mats with 'McLaren 25 anniversary Le Mans' logo

The vehicle went on sale in 2020-06-17.

=== 765LT Spider (2021–2023) ===
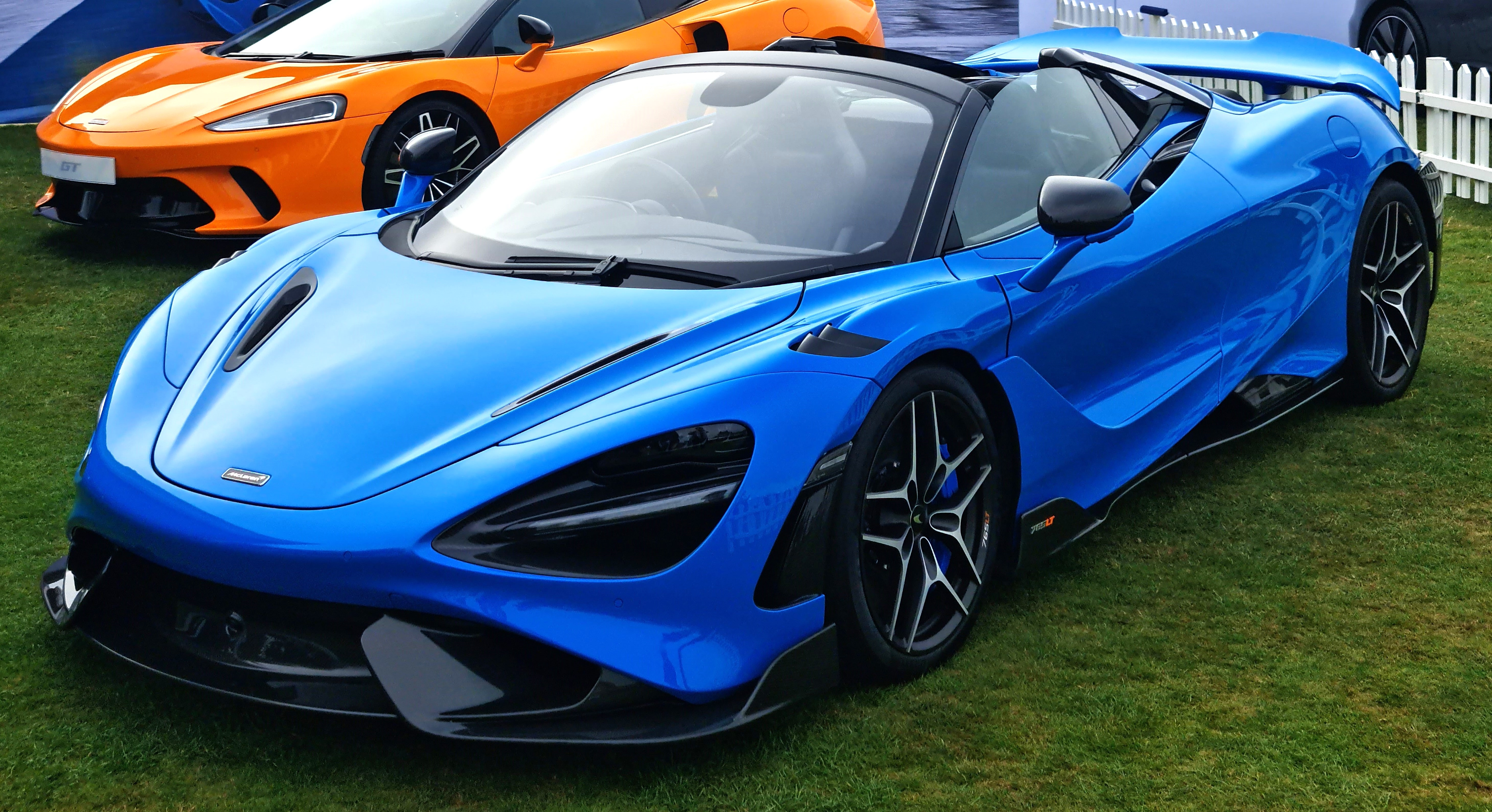
McLaren 765LT Spider

Unveiled on 27 July 2021, the Spider is a limited (765 units worldwide) version of the 765LT. It uses the same M840T engine which produces 765 PS (563 kW; 755 hp). The Spider weighs 80 kg (176 lb) less than the 720S Spider at 1,388 kg (3,060 lb), making it 49 kg (108 lb) heavier than the coupe.

== 750S (2023–present) ==
McLaren 750S
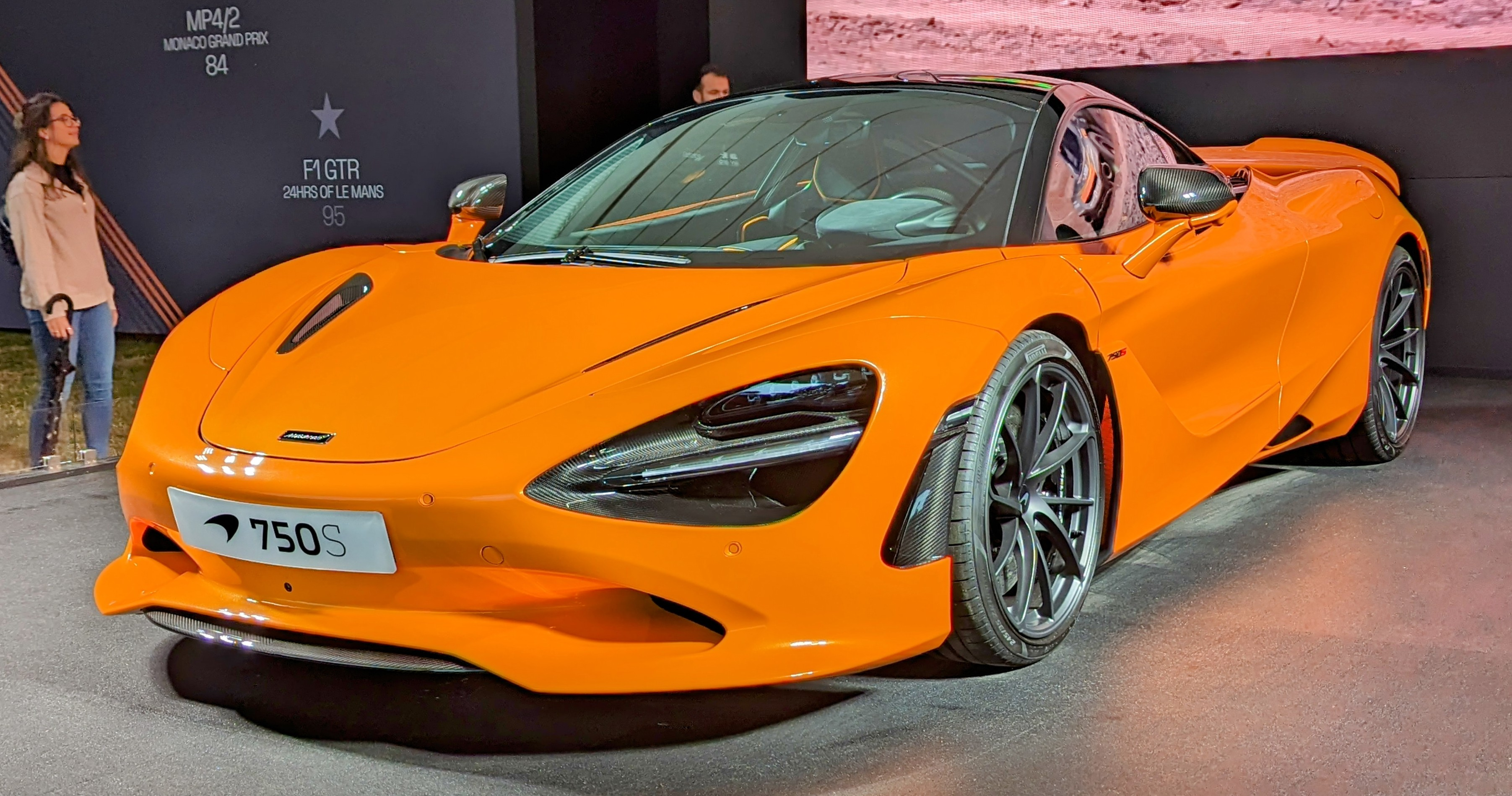

Overview
- Manufacturer: McLaren Automotive
- Production: 2023–present
- Assembly: United Kingdom: Woking, Surrey, England
- Designer: Sandy Holford (Chief Engineer)

Body and chassis
- Class: Sports car (S)
- Body style: 2-door coupé; 2-door retractable hard-top convertible (Spider)
- Layout: Rear mid-engine, rear-wheel drive
- Platform: MonoCage II carbon fibre monocoque
- Doors: Butterfly doors
- Related: McLaren Senna; McLaren Speedtail; McLaren GTS; McLaren Elva

Powertrain
- Engine: 3,994 cc (243.7 cu in) M840T twin-turbocharged V8
- Power output: 750 PS (550 kW; 740 hp) @ 7,500 rpm 800 N⋅m (590 lbf⋅ft) 5,500 rpm
- Transmission: 7-speed Graziano dual-clutch

Dimensions
- Wheelbase: 2,670 mm (105.1 in)
- Length: 4,569 mm (179.9 in)
- Width: 2,161 mm (85.1 in)
- Height: 1,196 mm (47.1 in)
- Kerb weight: 3,062 lb (1,389 kg) (750S Coupé)3,170 lb (1,438 kg) (750S Spider)

Chronology
- Predecessor: McLaren 720S
- Successor: McLaren McL 820

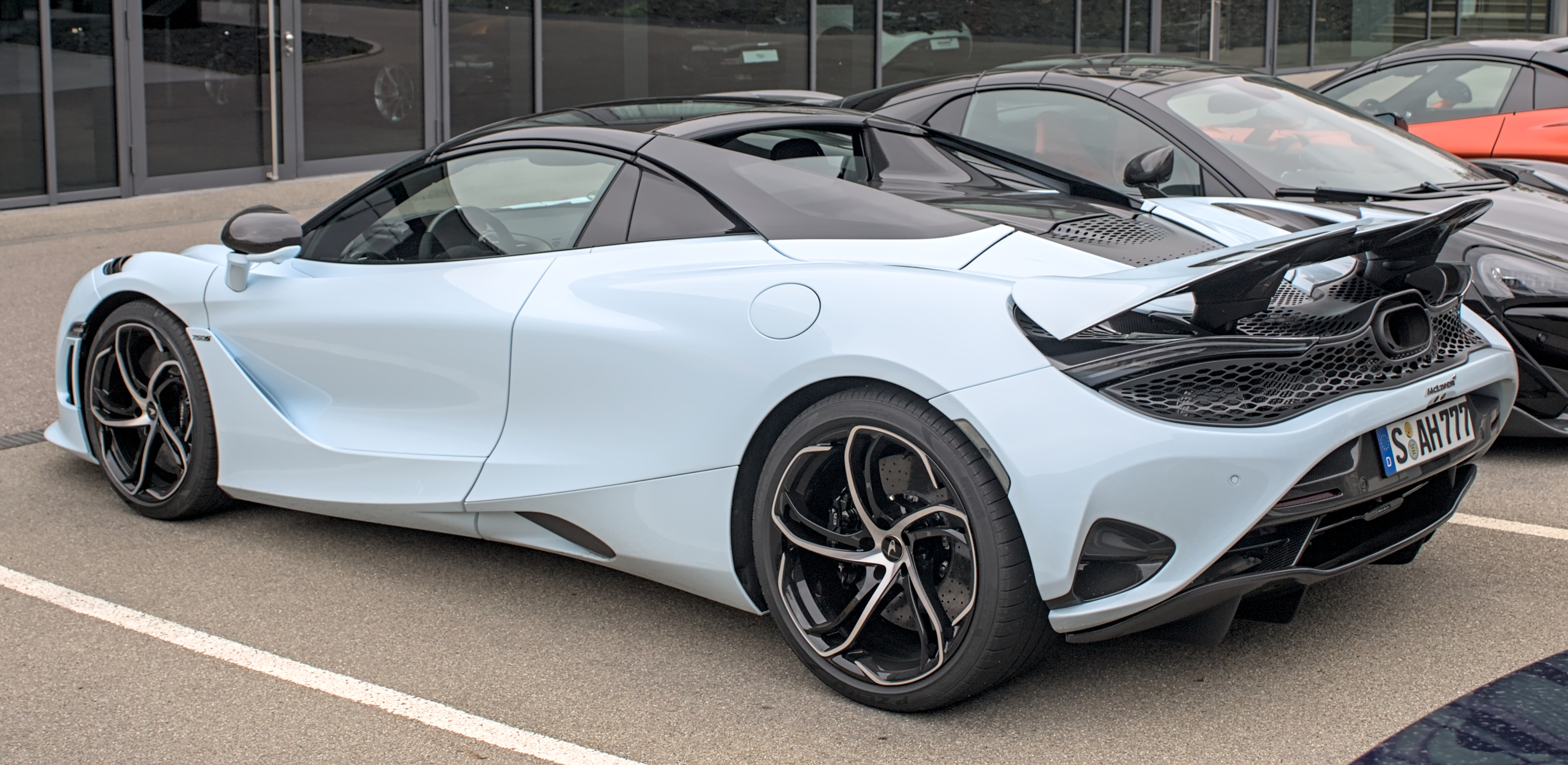
750S Spider

The McLaren 750S is the successor to the 720S and is scheduled to be McLaren Automotive's final model to be solely powered by an internal combustion engine. Essentially a facelifted version of the 720S, it features redesigned front and rear ends and an increase in power to 750 PS (552 kW; 740 hp). The 750S is also 30 kg (66 lbs) lighter than the 720S. According to McLaren, about 30 percent of the parts have been updated compared to the 720S. Other mechanical changes include a redesigned converging center-exit exhaust system, larger air intakes, 15% shorter transmission final-drive ratio, and a quicker steering ratio. On the interior, a new 8-inch Apple CarPlay–enabled infotainment system was added.

=== 788HS (2026) ===
On 9 July 2026, McLaren unveiled the 788HS as the definitive and final evolution of the supercar line that began with the 720S and continued through the 765LT and 750S. Its 4.0-litre twin-turbocharged V8 produces 788 PS (580 kW; 777 hp) and 800 N⋅m, with a claimed 0–100 km/h acceleration time of 2.8 seconds and a top speed of 330 km/h (205 mph). Production is limited to 200 cars, comprising 100 coupés and 100 Spiders, with each vehicle individually specified through McLaren Special Operations.

== Awards ==
- Top Gear – Supercar of the Year 2017
- Festival Automobile International – Most Beautiful Supercar of the Year 2017
- Red Dot Design Awards – Best of the Best 2018
- World Car Awards – 2019 World Performance Car
- IEEE – Top 10 Tech Cars in 2018

== Motorsport ==
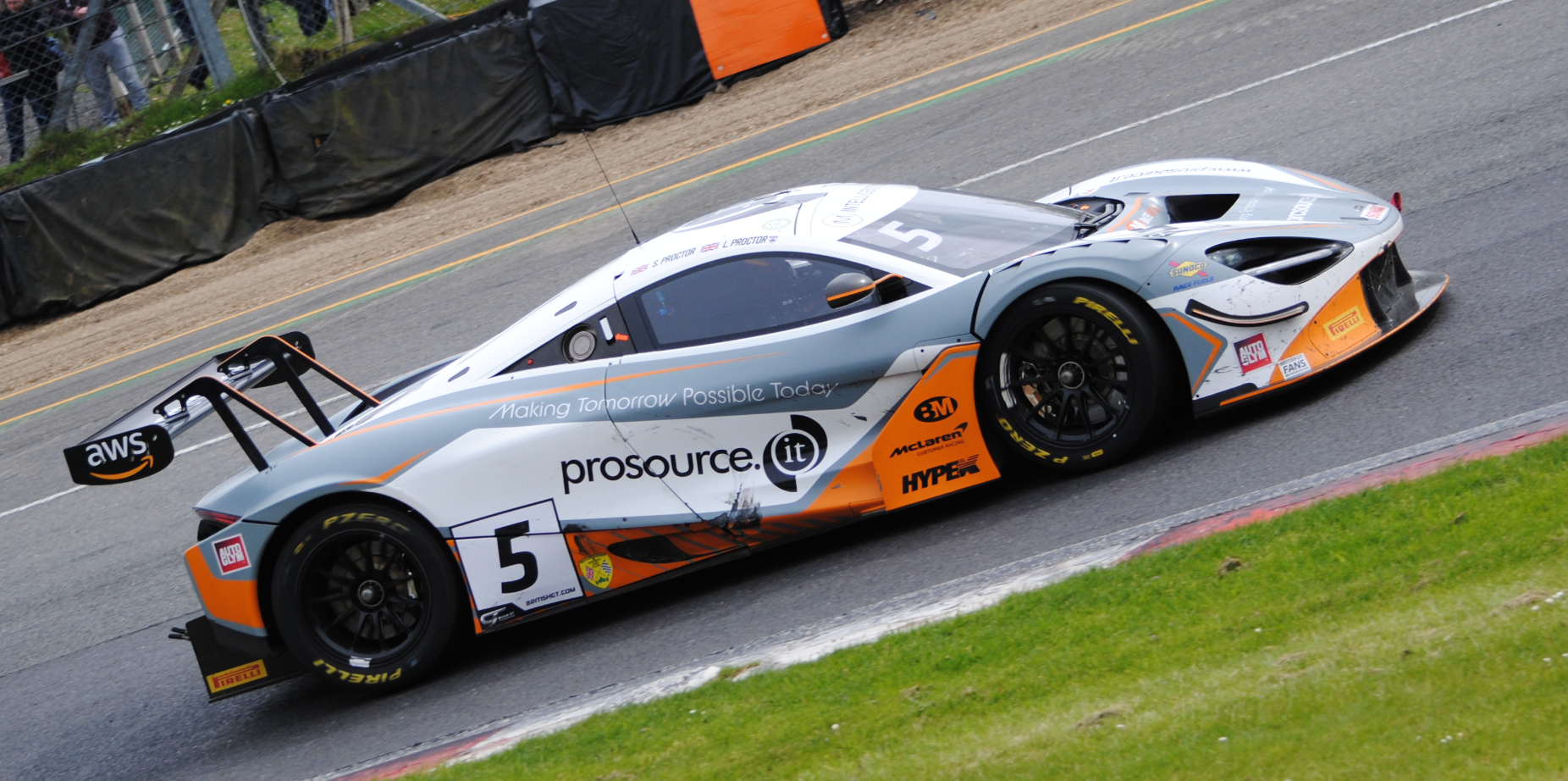
Enduro Motorsports 720S GT3

=== 720S GT3 ===
The McLaren 720S GT3 is a motorsport version of the 720S designed to take part in GT3 races. The car was revealed in August 2018 with a price of $564,000 and McLaren said that 90% of the car was different from the road-legal 720S. It was originally teased through renderings in November 2017.

=== 720S GT3 Evo ===
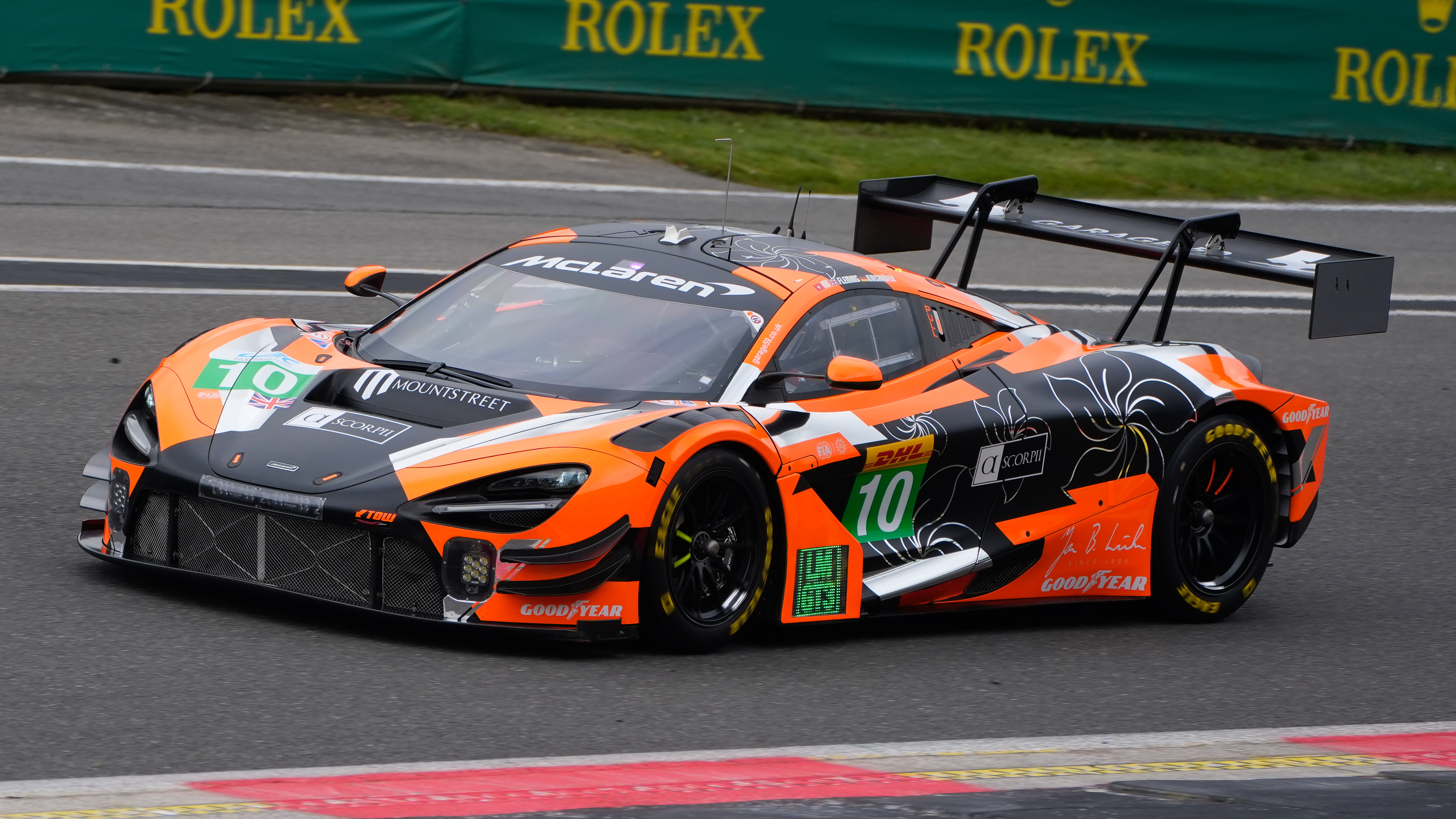
The No. 10 720S GT3 Evo of Garage 59 during the 2026 6 Hours of Spa-Francorchamps

In 2023, McLaren launched an Evo for the 720S GT3. The evo saw improvements made on aerodynamics and suspension, aimed at improving the car's handling in traffic. The car was available to be purchased brand new, or as an upgrade kit for existing 720S GT3 cars.

=== 720S GT3X (2021–2022) ===
In March 2021, McLaren announced the 720S GT3X, a track-only car based on the 720S GT3 which isn't limited by the restrictions put in place by the FIA for GT3-class cars.

A McLaren 720S GT3X won the 2021 Goodwood Festival of Speed hill climb, set the fastest time at the timed shootout final, sprinting up the hill in 45.01 seconds.

== Marketing ==
A LEGO Speed Champions McLaren 720S model kit, which also includes a minifigure car designer with design studio desk, went on sale June 2017.
