= McLaren Automotive =

British automobile manufacturer

McLaren Automotive Limited
- Type: Private
- Industry: Automotive
- Founded: 2 December 1985; 40 years ago (as McLaren Cars); 2010 (as McLaren Automotive)
- Founder: Ron Dennis
- Headquarters: McLaren Technology Centre, Woking, England
- Area served: Worldwide
- Key people: Nick Collins (CEO); Rob Melville (Design Director)
- Products: Sports cars
- Production output: ▼2,188 units
- Owner: CYVN Holdings
- Divisions: McLaren GT; McLaren Special Operations
- Website: www.mclaren.com/cars

McLaren Automotive (/məˈklærən/ mə-KLA-rən; formerly known as McLaren Cars) is a British luxury automotive manufacturer based at the McLaren Technology Centre in Woking, England. The main products of the company are sports cars, which are produced in-house in designated production facilities. As of March 2025, McLaren Automotive is wholly owned by CYVN Holdings LLC, owned by the government of Abu Dhabi.

== History ==
=== Origin and founder ===
McLaren Automotive replaced McLaren Cars in 2010. McLaren Cars was founded in 1985 and released the McLaren F1 in 1992. Between 1994 and 2010, McLaren Cars was registered as a 'dormant company', before the founding of McLaren Automotive in 2010. The new company was originally separate from the existing McLaren companies to enable investment in the new venture, but was brought together in July 2017 after Ron Dennis sold his shares in McLaren Automotive and McLaren Group.

McLaren's Formula One founder Bruce McLaren was born in Auckland, New Zealand in 1937, and learned about cars and engineering at his parents' service station and workshop there. By 15, he had entered a local hillclimb in an Austin 7 Ulster, winning his first race in the car. In 1958, McLaren arrived in the United Kingdom with the 'Driver to Europe' scheme, intended to help Australian and New Zealand racers to compete in Europe. His mentor, Jack Brabham, introduced him to Cooper Car Company, a small team based in Surbiton, Surrey. Auspiciously starting his Formula One career in 1958, McLaren joined the Formula One team a year later. That same year, he won the US Grand Prix at age 22, making him the youngest Grand Prix winner to that date. He stayed with Cooper for a further seven years, winning three more Grands Prix and other races, driving for Jaguar and Aston Martin, and winning the 24 Hours of Le Mans in 1966 with Ford.

McLaren founded Bruce McLaren Motor Racing in 1963. A year later, the company built the first true McLaren race car, the M1 (24 customer cars were produced by Elva). Its successor, the M1B, allowed McLaren into the Can-Am championship, where it dominated with 43 victories, almost three times more than rival Porsche. In 1965, the first McLaren Formula One car, the M2B, debuted at the Monaco Grand Prix.

After his victories and time in Formula One, McLaren was designing and testing a prototype M6GT-registered OBH 500H, a lightweight sports car with an estimated top speed of 165 mph (266 km/h) and zero to 100 mph time of eight seconds. McLaren died while testing a race car at Goodwood in 1970 before the prototype could be completed.

=== Merging, spinoff and growth ===
In 1980, the company merged with Ron Dennis’ Project 4 Racing team. The merger brought back designer John Barnard, who was interested in using carbon fibre composite. Carbon fibre was already used in aerospace applications but had never been applied to a complete racing car monocoque. McLaren pioneered the use of carbon fibre in motor racing with its new car, the MP4/1, bringing new levels of rigidity and driver safety to Formula 1. In August 1988, Dennis, Team Principal and Gordon Murray started to develop a new car and in 1992, the F1 was launched with a total production run of 106 units.

Following a brief collaboration with Mercedes-Benz for the SLR McLaren, McLaren Automotive was re-launched as a standalone manufacturer in 2010, spinning off McLaren Racing. The company launched the 12C in 2011 and its Spider variant in 2012. The limited-run P1 went into production in 2013 and ended in 2015. After introducing a business plan to release a car or model every year, the company unveiled the 650S in Coupé and Spider models in 2014, and unveiled the new Sports Series range comprising the McLaren 570S and 540C in 2015. The company debuted a spin-off model from the P1 for children, the P1TM, in September 2016 and announced the same month that they are developing a powerful battery for Formula E. In October 2016, councillors were reported to be looking at a proposition for land opposite the McLaren Technology Centre for construction and announced the "Pure McLaren Arctic Experience" the same month, an event where a participant was trained to drive a 570S in the Arctic Circle.

On 10 December 2024, it was reported that CYVN Holdings have acquired the automotive business of McLaren from Mumtalakat, a deal which will see the high-performance automobile company weathers through the financial woes and builds its first electric supercar. The deal will also see CYVN hold a non-controlling stake in McLaren's racing business.

In April 2025, following its successful acquisition of McLaren, CYVN merged McLaren with Forseven, a British electric vehicle start-up under their ownership, with the combined companies being renamed McLaren Group Holdings. The merger is intended to give McLaren the capability to expand beyond the manufacture of mid-engine supercars and into other product categories, bringing future Forseven vehicles to the market under the McLaren name and allowing the company to compete with the likes of Ferrari, Lamborghini, Aston Martin, and Bentley.

== List of CEOs ==
Current: Nick Collins (since May 2025)

=== Previous CEOs ===
- Mike Flewitt (2013–2021)
- Michael Leiters (2022–2025)

== Headquarters and facilities ==
McLaren Automotive is based at the McLaren Technology Centre, alongside the rest of the McLaren Group, and at the adjacent McLaren Production Centre. The two facilities are connected by a subterranean walkway, with the MPC built partially underground to minimise its presence.

In 2017 McLaren announced the construction of the £50m McLaren Composites Technology Centre (MCTC) at the Advanced Manufacturing Park in Rotherham. The facility will build carbon fibre chassis for future McLaren road cars. The facility aims to give McLaren greater control over the manufacture of composite tubs, providing an opportunity to increase the pace of the design and development of the tubs. Full production will begin at the MCTC by 2020. The MCTC was officially opened by The Duke of Cambridge, Duchess of Cambridge, and the Crown Prince of Bahrain in November 2018.

In September 2026, McLaren announced a £450 million investment in their technology centre. The investment is expected to create 1,000 jobs.

== Products and strategy ==
McLaren's first purpose-built road car was the F1, based on a concept developed by Gordon Murray that he convinced Ron Dennis to back. McLaren Cars went into hibernation following the completion of the F1's production run, and McLaren did not return to the production car market until launching McLaren Automotive in 2010, just prior to the release of the MP4-12C (eventually simplified to just 12C) in 2011.

McLaren launched its current three-tier product structure in 2015, dividing their range of cars into the Sports, Super, and Ultimate Series. Cars in the Sports and Super Series are given names based on the car's power output in PS, followed by a model designation (C for club, S for sport, GT for grand tourer and LT for longtail). The Sports Series is the entry-level tier, the Super Series is considered to be McLaren's core model range, the Ultimate Series is the high-end tier intended to be the successor to the original F1. The F1 and 12C were retroactively included in the Ultimate and Super Series, respectively. The structure was expanded to include the GT Series with the release of the McLaren GT in 2019.

=== Sports Series ===
Model	Year	Description
540C	2015–2020	
570S	2015–2021	Mid-engine, twin-turbo V8 sports car.
570S Spider	2016–2021	Convertible version of the 570S.
570GT	2017–2021	Comfort-focused version of the 570S.
600LT	2018–2021	
600LT Spider	2019–2021	
620R	2019–2021	
Artura	2022–present	Mid-engine, hybrid, turbocharged V6 sports car.

=== GT Series ===
Model	Year	
GT	2019–2023	Mid-engine, turbocharged V8 grand tourer.
GTS	2024–present	Reduced weight and higher power facelift of the GT.

=== Super Series ===
Model	Year	
12C	2011–2014	Mid-engine, twin-turbo V8 sports car.
12C Spider	2011–2014	Convertible version of the 12C.
650S	2014–2017	
650S Spider	2014–2016	
625C	2015–2016	
675LT	2015–2017	
675LT Spider	2016–2017	
720S	2017–2023	
720S Spider	2017–2023	
765LT	2020–2023	
765LT Spider	2021–2023	
750S	2023–present	Mid-engine, turbocharged V8 sports car.
788HS Coupé and Spider	2026	Mid-engine, twin-turbocharged V8 sports car. McLaren's last model to be solely powered by an internal combustion engine.

=== Ultimate Series ===
Model	Year	
F1	1992–1998	Mid-engine, naturally aspirated V12 sports car. Retroactively added as the first in the Ultimate Series.
F1 LM	1995	5 unit limited-production version of the F1 built in honour of the five McLaren F1 GTRs, which finished the 1995 24 Hours of Le Mans.
F1 GT	1997	Homologation special for the McLaren F1 GTR.
P1	2013–2015	375 units. Mid-engine, twin-turbocharged V8 hybrid sports car. Second in the Ultimate Series.
P1 GTR	2015–2016	58 unit limited-production. Lighter and more powerful version of the P1 to celebrate 20 years since their victory in the 1995 24 Hours of Le Mans.
Senna	2018–2020	Limited-production. Mid-engine, twin-turbocharged V8 sports car. Third in the Ultimate Series.
Senna GTR	2018–2020	75 units. Track-only version of the Senna.
Speedtail	2020	Limited-production. Mid-engine, twin-turbocharged V8 sports car. Fourth in the Ultimate Series.
Elva	2020	Limited-production. Mid-engine, twin-turbocharged V8, open-top sports car. Fifth in the Ultimate Series.
Solus GT	2023	25 unit limited-production. Mid-engine, naturally aspirated V10, track-only sports car. Sixth in the Ultimate Series.
W1	2025	399 unit limited-production. Mid-engine, twin-turbocharged V8 hybrid sports car. Successor to the P1.

=== Heritage ===
McL 6GT	Upcoming	Upcoming V8 sports car with a manual transmission.

=== Collaborations ===
==== Mercedes-Benz SLR McLaren ====
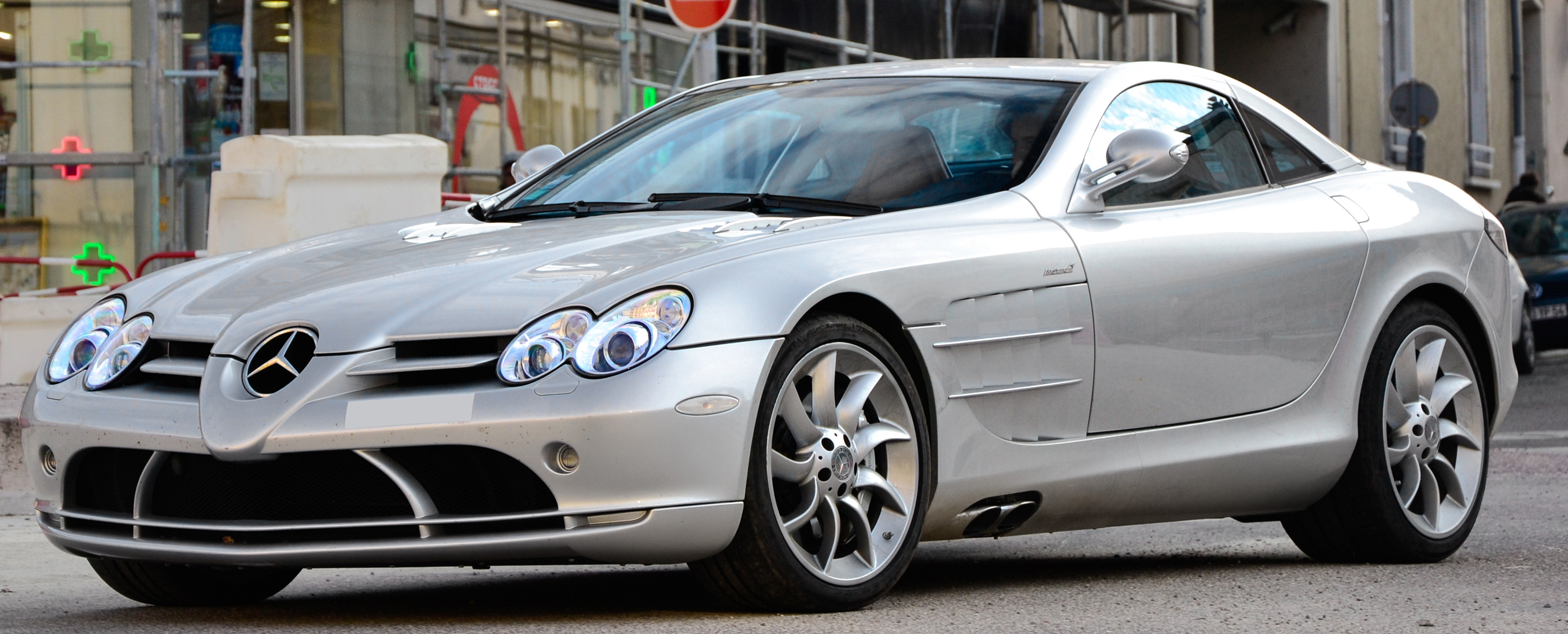
Mercedes-Benz SLR McLaren

In 1999, McLaren agreed to design and manufacture the SLR (also known as P7) in conjunction with Mercedes-Benz. DaimlerChrysler was the engine supplier to McLaren Racing through its Formula One partner Mercedes-Benz division. The final stages of production of the Mercedes-Benz SLR McLaren took place at a designated assembly facility at the McLaren Technology Centre.

The SLR featured a 5.5-litre (340 cu in) supercharged V8 engine that produced 626 PS (460 kW; 617 hp) at 6500 rpm and 780 N⋅m (575 lbf⋅ft) of torque at 3250–5000 rpm. It can accelerate from 0 to 60 mph (0–97 km/h) in 3.8 seconds and 0 to 100 mph (0–161 km/h) in 6.3 seconds.

In 2006, the Mercedes-Benz McLaren SLR 722 Edition was announced. The "722 Edition" produced 650 PS (478 kW; 641 hp) at 6500 rpm and 820 N⋅m (605 lb⋅ft) of torque at 4000 rpm, with a top speed of 337 km/h (209 mph)—3 km/h (2 mph) more than the standard SLR. A new suspension is used with 19-inch (480 mm) light-alloy wheels, a stiffer damper configuration and 10 mm (0.4 in) lower body.

In 2007, the Mercedes-Benz McLaren SLR Convertible was announced, which was available starting in late 2007. The car uses the same supercharged 5.5-litre (340 cu in) V8 found in the coupé.

A limited edition called the SLR Stirling Moss was introduced. The car was the final SLR produced and a tribute to Stirling Moss. Beneath the scissor-doors is a plaque with Moss' signature on it.

==== Unreleased vehicles ====
The partnership between Mercedes-Benz and McLaren resulted in three further cars being proposed. The P9 was to be a mid-engined baby supercar with a less expensive model, with the P8 (or "SLS") competing with cars such as the Ferrari F430, Bentley Continental GT, and Aston Martin DB9. Both cars were to be powered by naturally aspirated V8 engines. The P10 would have been an SLR replacement.

All three cars were aborted in 2005, with Mercedes rumoured to have considered the projects simply too costly to turn into a solid business case, although Mercedes' AMG subsidiary produced a flagship sports car called the Mercedes-Benz SLS AMG. The car had a naturally aspirated V8 with over 580 PS (430 kW; 570 bhp); however, it is not thought to be related to the P8 project.

== Division ==
=== McLaren Customer Racing ===
McLaren Customer Racing is the sports car racing arm of McLaren Automotive, established in 2011 as McLaren GT to develop, build and support all McLaren track and GT race activities. The division is currently responsible for the design, development and production of the 720S GT3 and 570S GT4, along with the new Artura GT4 and Artura Trophy.

The first car developed by McLaren GT was the 12C GT3, which was launched in 2011, and following a development year, 25 examples were delivered to customers for racing throughout Europe in 2012. The debut season saw 13 McLaren GT customer teams visit 14 countries and between them, the teams claimed a total of 19 race victories in the FIA GT1 World Championship, Blancpain Endurance Series, 24 Hours of Barcelona, British GT, City Challenge Baku, FFSA French GT and GT Cup.

A total of 19 McLaren GT customer teams contested the 2013 season, entering 108 races across 15 championships globally. In total, the teams claimed 27 pole positions, 23 victories, a further 39 podium finishes and three championship titles.

Following the successful 2013 season, McLaren GT expanded its customer support with the competitive debut for the 12C GT3 car in the Pirelli World Challenge championship in North America.

Around 15 examples of the 650S GT3 made race debuts during the 2015 race season, claiming a number of victories. Most notably the McLaren GT customer racing team Von Ryan Racing took victory at the Blancpain Endurance Series at Silverstone, marking the first win in the Blancpain Endurance Series for the 650S GT3 in its debut competitive season.

The 650S GT3 was the dominant GT car in 2016. In February, Australian team Tekno Autosports won the 2016 Liqui Moly Bathurst 12 Hour at the Mount Panorama Circuit in Australia with drivers Álvaro Parente, Shane van Gisbergen and Jonathon Webb. In the 2016 Blancpain GT Series Endurance Cup, British team Garage 59 won the 3 Hours of Monza and the 1000 km of Paul Ricard on their way to the title with their team of van Gisbergen, Rob Bell and Côme Ledogar.

=== McLaren Special Operations ===
McLaren Special Operations (MSO) is McLaren's bespoke division. Officially launched in 2011, MSO's origins date back over 20 years, as the division grew out of the McLaren Customer Care Programme that was set up in the early 1990s to service, maintain and personalise the McLaren F1 for owners.

== See also ==
- Aston Martin
- McLaren
