= McLaren McL 6GT =

Overview
- Manufacturer: McLaren Automotive
- Production: 2028 (planned)
- Designer: Kemal Curić (Chief Design Officer); Oliver Ball (Lead Exterior Designer); Charles Purvis (Lead Interior Designer)

Body and chassis
- Class: Sports car (S)
- Body style: 2-door coupe
- Layout: Rear mid-engine, rear-wheel drive
- Platform: MonoCage II carbon fibre monocoque
- Doors: Butterfly doors

Powertrain
- Engine: 3,994 cc (243.7 cu in) M840T twin-turbocharged V8
- Transmission: 6-speed Graziano manual

The McLaren McL 6GT is an upcoming sports car developed by McLaren Automotive, set to enter production in 2028. It was first unveiled as a prototype on 14 August 2026.

== Overview ==
The McL 6GT draws inspiration from the M6GT originally built in the 1960s. Its production version is set to be positioned between McLaren's core vehicles and the more exclusive "Ultimate Series" lineup, under a new category alongside existing models.

The McL 6GT's exterior design differs from existing McLaren models, adopting design forms and elements taken from the M6GT, such as the "racing loop" taillights. Its interior features a digital instrument cluster and aluminum physical controls.

=== Specifications ===
While technical specifications remain largely unannounced, McLaren has announced that the production version of the McL 6GT will feature a V8 engine, rear wheel drive drivetrain and a six-speed manual transmission, making it the first McLaren since the F1 to feature a manual transmission.
