= McLaren Elva =

Sports car designed and produced by McLaren Automotive

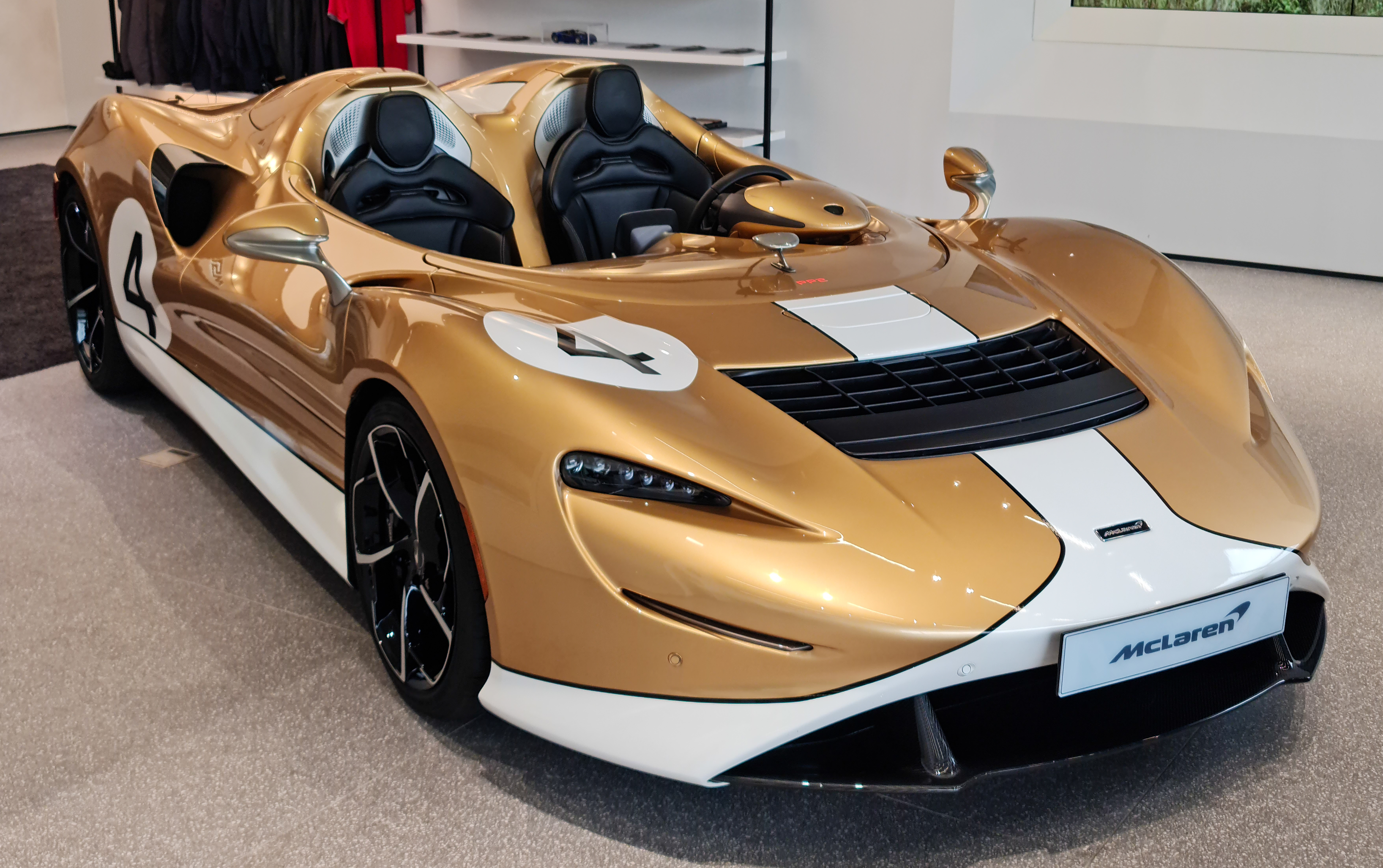
- McLaren Elva in Colorado Gold and White

Overview
- Manufacturer: McLaren Automotive
- Production: 2020
- Assembly: United Kingdom: Woking, Surrey, England
- Designer: Rob Melville

Body and chassis
- Class: Sports car (S)
- Body style: 2-door speedster
- Layout: Rear mid-engine, rear-wheel-drive
- Platform: MonoCage III carbon fibre monocoque
- Doors: Dihedral
- Related: McLaren 720S; McLaren Speedtail; McLaren Senna

Powertrain
- Engine: 4.0 L M840TR twin-turbocharged V8
- Power output: 815 PS (599 kW; 804 hp); 800 N⋅m (590 lb⋅ft)
- Transmission: 7-speed dual-clutch

Dimensions
- Curb weight: 1,269.2 kg (2,798 lb)

The McLaren Elva is a limited-production mid-engine sports car manufactured by McLaren Automotive. The car is the fifth in the McLaren Ultimate Series, after the F1, the P1, Senna, and the Speedtail. The open-top sports car is inspired by the open top race cars developed by Bruce McLaren in the 1960s.

== Name ==
The name Elva is derived from elle va, which means "she goes" in French. The car is named after the lightweight early open top race cars developed by Bruce McLaren. The M1A, M1B and M1C were produced between 1964 and 1967. Due to limited staff, production was outsourced to British automobile manufacturer Elva.

== Elva (2019–present) ==
The vehicle went on sale for base price of $1,690,000 (USD), which does not include audio, but a bespoke system can be ordered with no additional cost. A fixed windscreen variant was also available as a factory option.

The vehicle was unveiled in Dubai, United Arab Emirates.

Delivery of the Middle East model began in the first half of 2021.

=== Elva M6A Theme by MSO (2020–present) ===
It is a version of Elva replicating the 1964 Can-Am race car, with Anniversary Orange body colour with Dove Grey stripe, McLaren Cars decal and Bruce signature in Blue, and Bruce’s race number 4, satin carbon fibre and 10-spoke Diamond Cut wheels.

=== Elva M1A Theme by MSO (2020–present) ===
The M1A version is based on the McLaren-Elva M1A driven by Bruce McLaren that had broken Mosport Park lap record in 1964, with ultra-light carbon fibre, Magnesium Silver racing stripe at sills, front splitter, bonnet with Accent Red pinstripe and Bruce McLaren’s number 4 racing roundel; seats and steering wheel detail in Malibu Red Nubuck with matching stitching and Tonal micro-piping.

The vehicle was unveiled at the 2020 Salon Privé.

=== Elva Gulf Theme by MSO (2020–present) ===
It is a version of McLaren Elva in blue and orange Gulf body colours.

The vehicle was unveiled at the Goodwood Motor Circuit, followed by Hong Kong.

=== Elva with windscreen (2021–present) ===
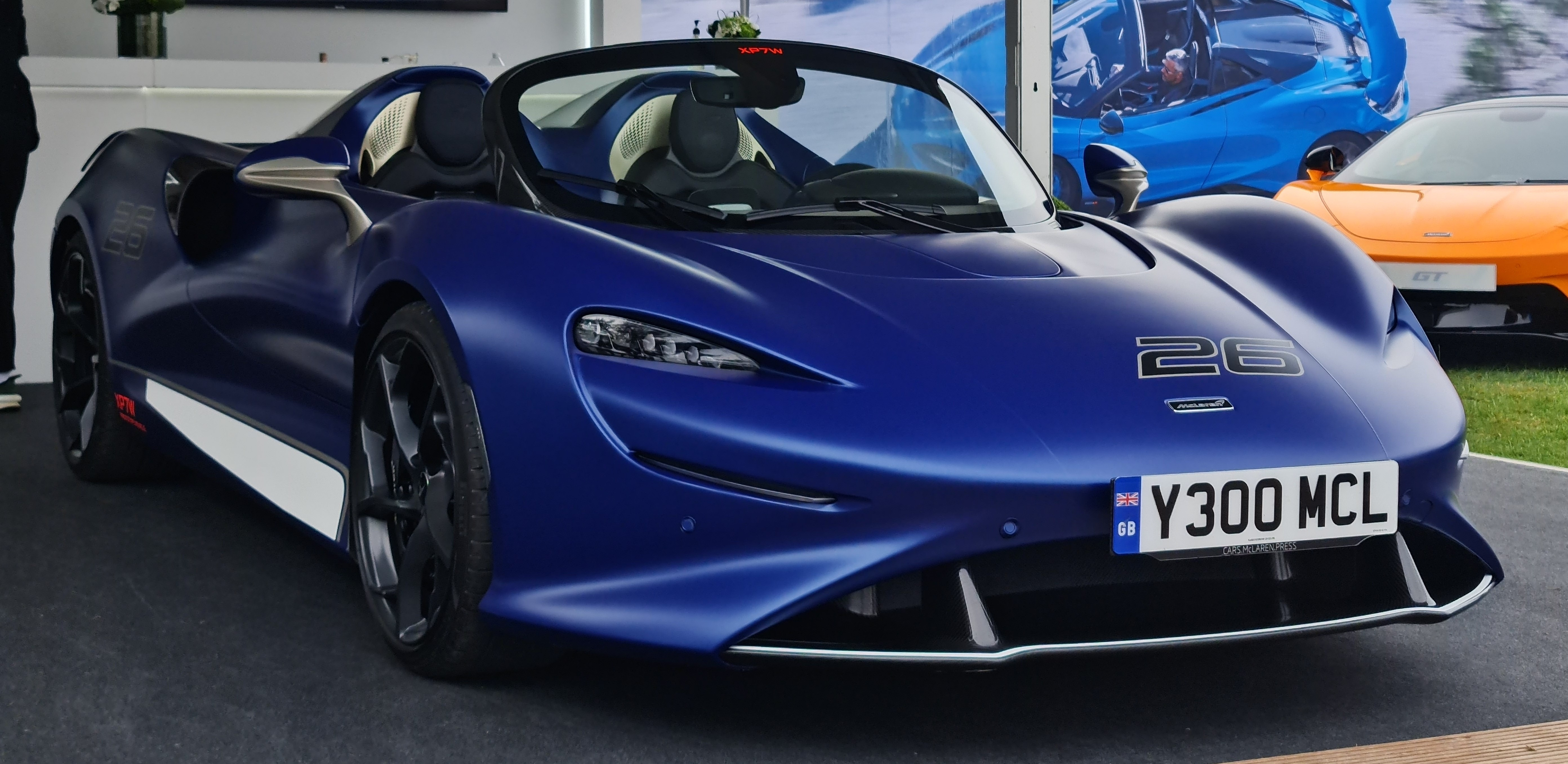
McLaren Elva with windscreen.

Originally announced in 2019, this version included windscreen for customers who prefer to have a physical screen and to meet local legal requirements in some countries and some states in the USA.

The vehicle was unveiled at the 2021 Salon Privé.

Delivery was set to begin by the end of 2021, following personalisation by McLaren Special Operations.

== Specifications ==
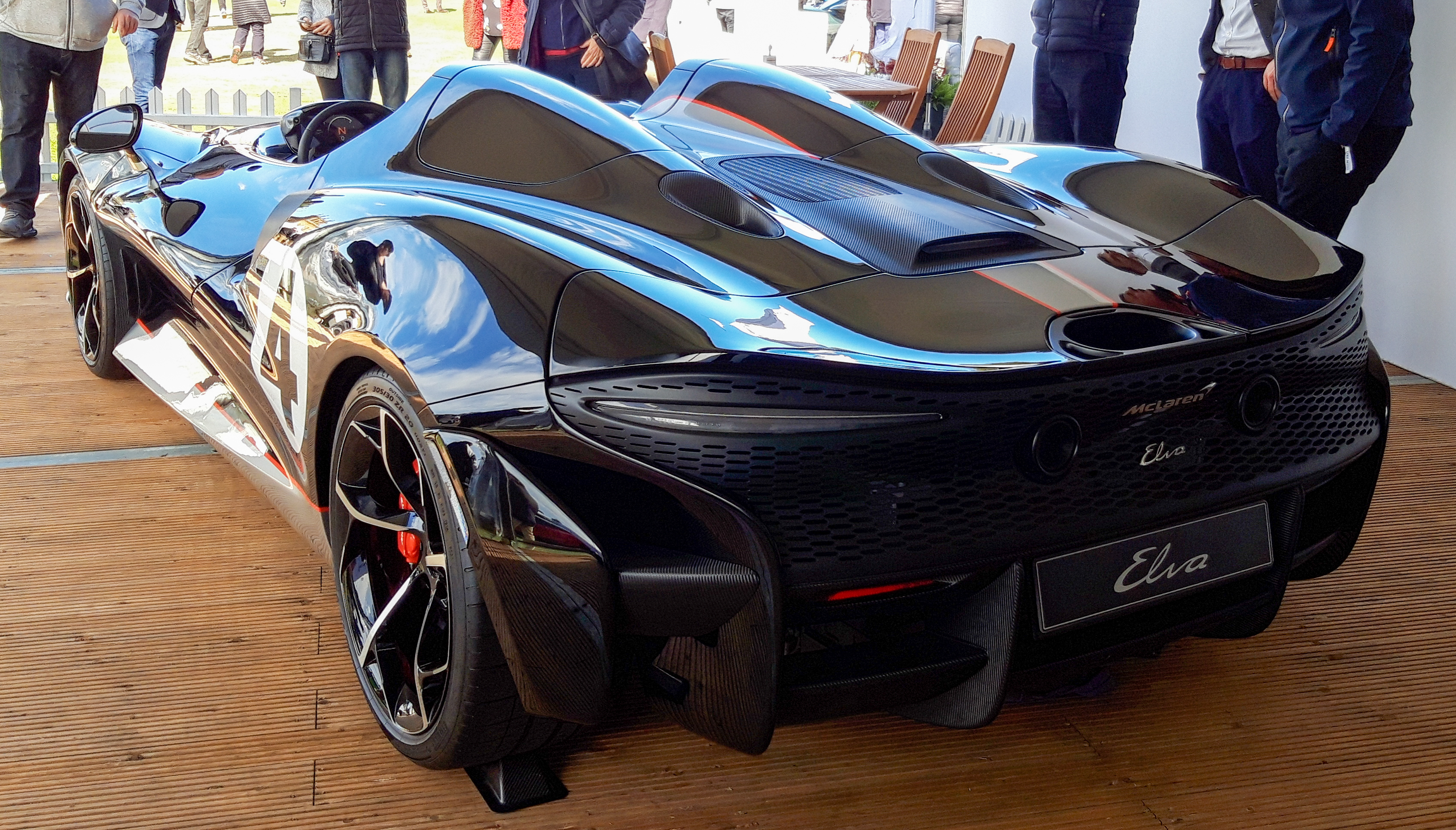
Rear

Being the company's first road-legal sports car to be offered with no roof and windscreen, the Elva is claimed to be the lightest sports car ever produced by McLaren though the actual kerb weight is yet to be announced. The car's entire body work is made of carbon fibre including the chassis, doors and seats in order to keep the weight low. The brake rotors, which are shared with the Senna measure more than 390 mm (15 in). Weight savings of about 1 kg (2.2 lb) is achieved over the Senna's brake rotors by the usage of titanium brake calipers. A carbon fibre spar runs the entire length of the interior which supports the arm rest of the seats, a variety of controls and separates the driver and passenger.

A six-point racing harness is optional for customers who want to take the car for track day driving. For protection against roll-over crashes, a deployable roll-over protection system is included as standard. The optional audio system has marine-grade speakers for protection against adverse weather conditions. The interior features a centrally mounted touch screen to control most of the car's functions. Although the Elva has no windshield or windows, a front windshield will be added for the cars intended for the US market.

The McLaren Air Active Management System (AAMS) channels airflow through the car's nose from an inlet in the splitter and directs it at a radius of 130-degrees in front of the occupants (called "oasis of calm" by McLaren). This system activates at speeds up to 40 km/h (25 mph) where airflow and overall noise are high to create a comfort zone over the occupants. The system can be turned off whilst track driving so that the air channeled through the nose is sent to the engine instead. The Elva also features an active rear spoiler which also acts as an air-brake thus seeing the braking force load with the brakes. A flat undercarriage also helps in improving aerodynamics.

The front clamshell is a major part of the aerodynamics package of the car. While it's an integral part of the AAMS, it also features two air intakes at the front of each door which directs air to the car's dual intercoolers mounted in front of each rear wheel.

The 4.0-litre twin-turbocharged V8, rated at 815 PS (599 kW; 804 hp) and 800 N⋅m (590 lb⋅ft) of torque, is shared with the Senna and the Speedtail and is the most powerful variant of McLaren's V8 engine. The engine is fitted with a flat-plane crankshaft, low-mass reciprocating components and a dry sump lubrication system. The exhaust system is made from titanium and Inconel while the exhaust tips are of a quad type and are 3D-printed. The Elva also features a full-time suspension and an electro-hydraulic steering to improve handling. The car will be built to customer specifications by McLaren's MSO department.

=== Performance ===
The Elva can accelerate to 100 km/h (62 mph) in less than three seconds and to 200 km/h (124 mph) in 6.7 seconds. It peaks at 203 mph.

== Production ==
Production was originally to be limited to 399 units with customer deliveries scheduled to begin in late 2020, but later in April 2020, the production total was reduced to 249 units, according to McLaren CEO Mike Flewitt, citing customer feedback encouraging exclusivity for the decision rather than sluggish sales. Production was eventually limited to 149 units.

== Marketing ==
LEGO Speed Champions McLaren Elva model kit went on sale on 1 June 2021, which included a McLaren driver minifigure, complete with race suit, helmet and wrench, inspired by McLaren Automotive's Principal Development Engineer for Ultimate Series, Rachel Brown.
