= Rob Melville =

British car designer

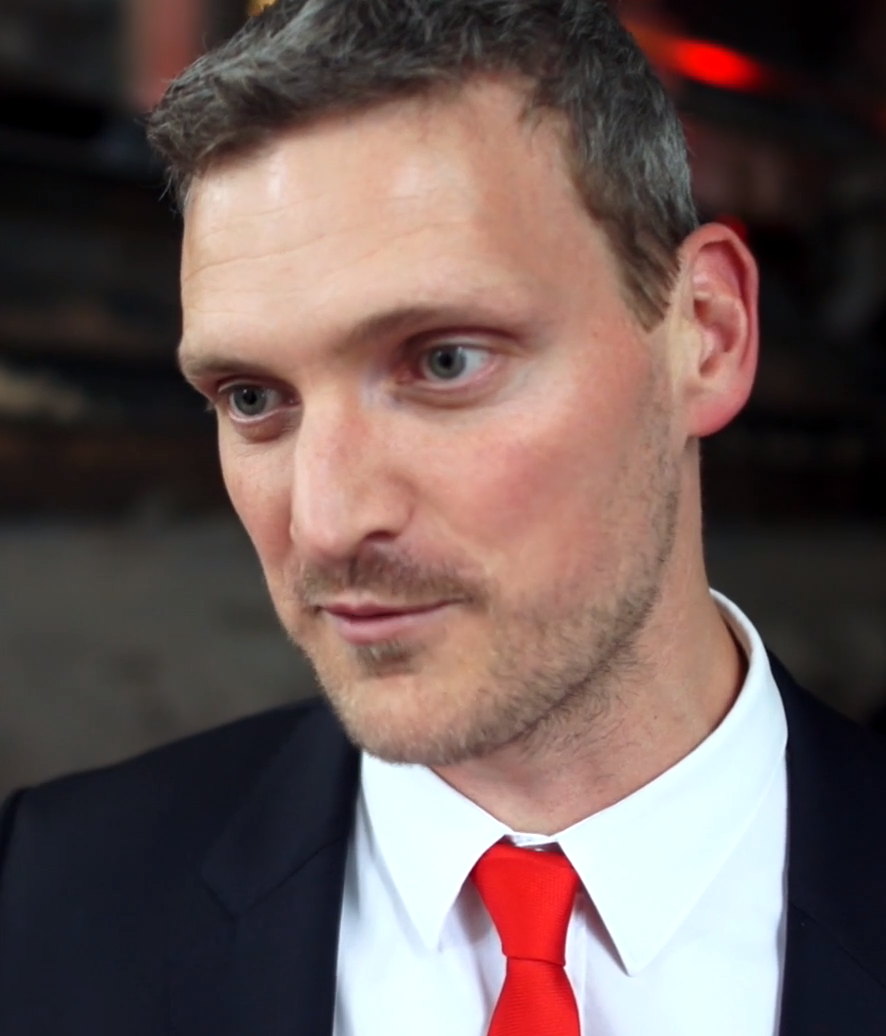
Robert Melville at the Red Dot Award Gala: Product Design in 2016

Robert Melville is a British car designer who is currently working as the Chief Design officer at Ceer Motors. He previously worked with Jaguar Land Rover, General Motors and McLaren Automotive.

Melville helped to design the Range Rover, Cadillac Converj, McLaren P1, McLaren 650S and was Chief Designer of the McLaren 675LT, McLaren 570S/570GT, McLaren GT, McLaren 720S and McLaren Artura.

== Early life ==
Melville is the youngest of three boys. His father was an engineer and mother an artist. Robert enjoyed spending his time studying and sketching nature and different vehicles. Graduating from Benton Park in 1996, He then went to Leeds college of art and design. He graduated from The University of Huddersfield in 2001 with a 1st in BA (Hons) Vehicle Design, he then went on to study a Master in Automotive Design at the Royal College of Art in London.

== Career ==
=== Jaguar Land Rover ===
In 2003, Melville joined the Jaguar Land Rover Advanced Design team, where he went on to design the Range Rover Evoque.

=== General Motors ===
In 2006, he joined General Motors in the UK as Senior Creative Designer. Here, he led designs for the Cadillac Converj, Chevrolet Corvette, Hummer, and Buick.

=== McLaren ===
In 2009, he was recruited by McLaren CEO Antony Sheriff, and became the Senior Designer for McLaren Automotive. He was promoted to Chief Designer in 2015, at the age of 37. He designed the McLaren 570S, 570GT & 570S Spider before designing the McLaren 720S, which debuted in 2017. The 720S, designed by Melville, represents a departure from McLaren's classic design style. The traditional side air takes have been removed in exchange for smooth side panels. The dihedral doors include built-in air channels which direct air to the engine. "Every profile, every curve on this car has been designed for maximum driver engagement," says Melville about the 720S.

In May 2017, Melville was promoted to McLaren Director of Design, replacing Frank Stephenson.

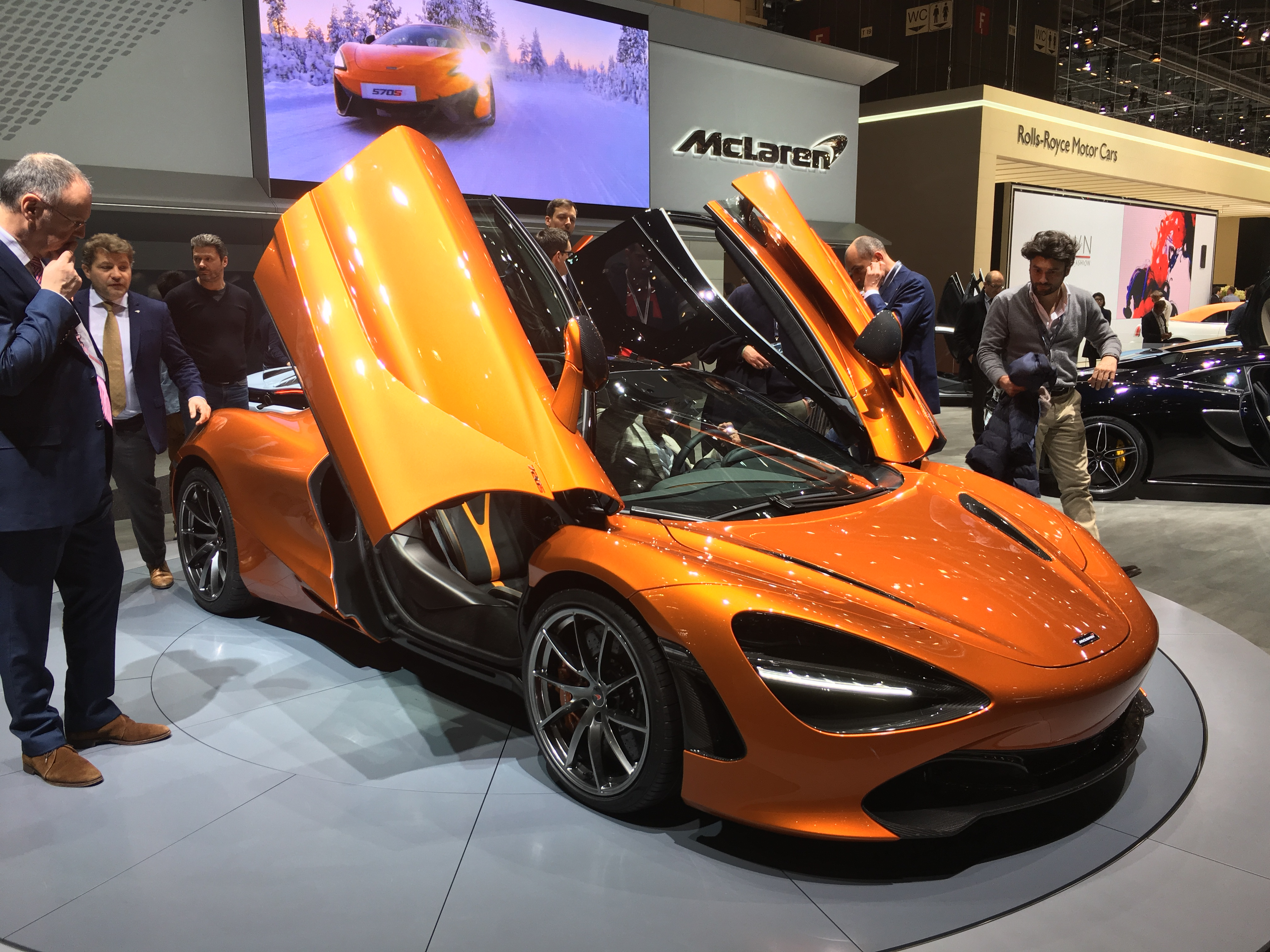
The McLaren 720S, designed by Robert Melville

As McLaren Director of Design Melville led the design of some of McLaren’s most iconic designs such as the McLaren Senna, Speedtail, Elva, 765LT and McLaren Solus GT. Melville first penned the concept that became the Solus GT in 2011 as a ‘design vision’ to guide all McLarens for the coming generation and beyond. The concept first appeared in the 2017 video game Gran Turismo.

Melville left McLaren in 2022, replaced by Goran Ozbolt.

== Design Collaborations ==
Melville is also responsible for design collaborations with Belstaff X McLaren clothing range 2017, and Richard Mille - RM40-01 Tourbillon, and Richard Mille - RM11-03 Automatic Flyback Chronograph. The RM 11-03 McLaren, created in close collaboration between McLaren Design Director Rob Melville and Richard Mille Engineer Fabrice Namura, was created in 2018, uniting a mutual interest in unique design, the use of new materials and modern craftsmanship. These influences, as well as design cues taken from McLaren’s range of luxury sportscars and super cars, are reflected in this special timepiece.
