= McLaren Speedtail =

Sports car designed and produced by McLaren Automotive

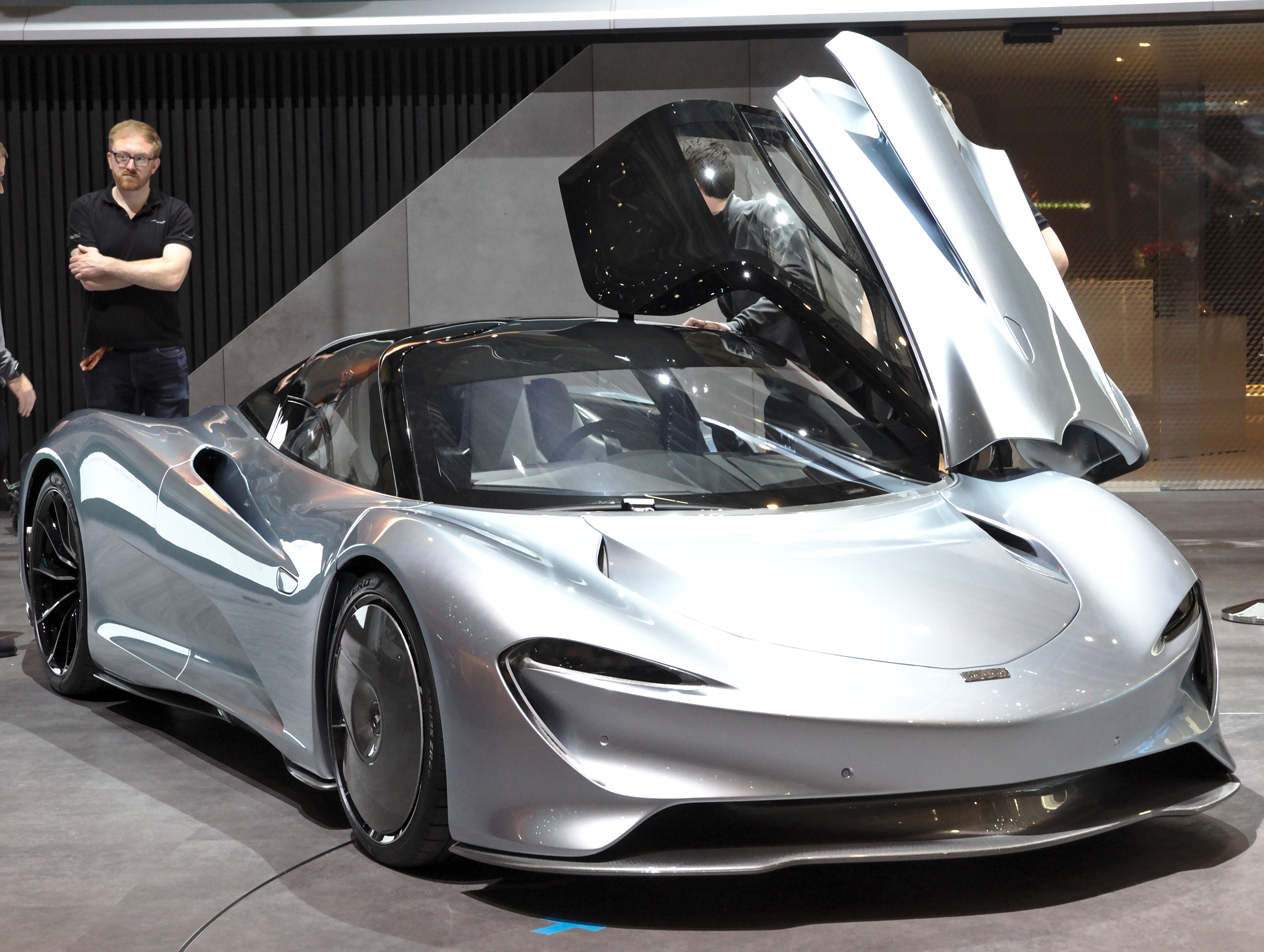

Overview
- Manufacturer: McLaren Automotive
- Production: 2020; 106 produced
- Assembly: United Kingdom: Woking, Surrey, England (McLaren Technology Centre)
- Designer: Rob Melville; Alex Alexiev

Body and chassis
- Class: Sports car (S)
- Body style: 2-door coupé
- Layout: Rear mid-engine, rear-wheel-drive
- Related: McLaren 720S; McLaren Elva; McLaren Senna

Powertrain
- Engine: 4.0 L M840T twin-turbocharged V8 with parallel hybrid system eMotor
- Electric motor: 310 PS (306 hp; 228 kW) MAT & Hewland e-Axle Permanent magnet motor
- Power output: 1,050 PS (1,036 bhp; 772 kW)
- Transmission: 7-speed Graziano dual-clutch
- Hybrid drivetrain: Parallel Hybrid
- Battery: 1.647 kWh lithium-ion battery

Dimensions
- Wheelbase: 2,730 mm (107.5 in)
- Length: 5,137 mm (202.2 in)
- Height: 1,120 mm (44.1 in)
- Kerb weight: 1,597 kg (3,521 lb); 1,430 kg (3,153 lb) dry

Chronology
- Predecessor: McLaren F1 (spiritual)

The McLaren Speedtail is a limited production hybrid sports car manufactured by McLaren Automotive, revealed on October 26, 2018. This car is the fourth edition in the McLaren Ultimate Series, after the Senna, the P1, and the F1. The car is also part of the 18 new cars or derivatives that McLaren will launch as part of its Track22 business plan.

== Specifications ==
The Speedtail is powered by a version of the M840T twin turbocharged V8 engine from the 720S, upgraded to produce 746 hp; 556 kW (756 PS) and 590 lb⋅ft (800 N⋅m) of torque. The engine is combined with a hybrid powertrain producing an extra 312 PS (229 kW; 308 bhp) to generate a total power output of 1,036 hp (773 kW; 1,050 PS) and 848 lb⋅ft (1,150 N⋅m) of torque. The Speedtail uses a carbon fibre monocoque, with the passenger seats integrated into the chassis, as well as dihedral doors like other McLaren models. McLaren claims that the Speedtail has a top speed of 250 mph (403 km/h), can accelerate from 0–60 mph (0–97 km/h) in 2.9 seconds, 0–100 mph (0–161 km/h) in 5.1 seconds, and 0–299 km/h (0–186 mph) in 12.8 seconds.

== Technology ==
The Speedtail recharges its hybrid battery while driving, though a wireless charging pad is included with the car, trickle-charging it when not in use.

McLaren says that one of the main goals of the Speedtail was to minimize drag. To achieve this, the design is inspired by the shape of a teardrop and features carbon fibre static covers on the front wheels. It also features hydraulically actuated active rear aerodynamic control surfaces, which are formed in flexible carbon fibre and are an integral part of the rear clamshell. McLaren says this was chosen over a traditional rear spoiler in order to reduce drag. The Speedtail is fitted with electrochromic glass, which darkens at the push of a button, eliminating the need for sun visors. Similarly, the Speedtail does not feature door mirrors, instead using HD cameras mounted on the front guards that pop out when the ignition is turned on and retract inside when the "Velocity mode" is activated, which reduces overall drag and optimizes performance.

== Interior ==
The Speedtail has a 3-seat layout, similar to the preceding F1, which has the driver sitting at the centre of the car, and slightly forward of the two passenger seats. On the original F1, this layout was used to provide better visibility than a conventional seating layout. The interior of the Speedtail features "directional leather finish" which McLaren says, “makes it easy to slide into the seat but then subtly holds the occupant in place while they drive.” and is strong enough that it can be used in place of carpet on the floor of the Speedtail. It also features "Titanium Deposition Carbon Fibre", which is when "a micron-thin layer of titanium is fused directly onto the weave and becomes an integral part of the carbon fibre’s construction.", as well as Thin-Ply Technology Carbon Fibre (TPT), consisting of countless 30 micron thick layers of carbon fibre. The company also offers bespoke luggage for Speedtail owners, a practice implemented when the F1 went on sale.

== Production ==
Testing was done in Florida at the Kennedy Space Center at the Johnny Bohmer Proving Grounds. The shuttle landing runway was used for the tests. It was also tested on tracks in Germany, Spain and Italy.

In November 2018, McLaren planned to build 106 examples of the Speedtail at an MSRP of around £2.1 million. Due in part to its use of cameras in place of side mirrors and no side-mounted airbags, the Speedtail does not meet Federal Motor Vehicle Safety Standards (FMVSS) in the United States, even though around 35% of the total cars were bought by American buyers. A spokeswoman for the company stated that the car may be legal, pending approval by the NHTSA, to be imported into the U.S. under the “Show or Display” law, which exempts cars that are “historically or technologically significant" from FMVSS, but imposes a mileage limit of 2,500 miles in a 12-month period and registration of the vehicle with the DOT. McLaren has made it clear that they will not offer assistance with importing or registering the Speedtail in the U.S.

Production of the McLaren Speedtail commenced in the United Kingdom after high-speed testing was completed by December 2019. The prototype XP2 version had "reached its terminal velocity more than 30 times," topping out at 250 mph (403 km/h), and able to go from a standstill to 186 mph (300 km/h) in less than 13 seconds. The first deliveries, 106 cars, were slated for February 2020 to Woking, England.

== Gallery ==

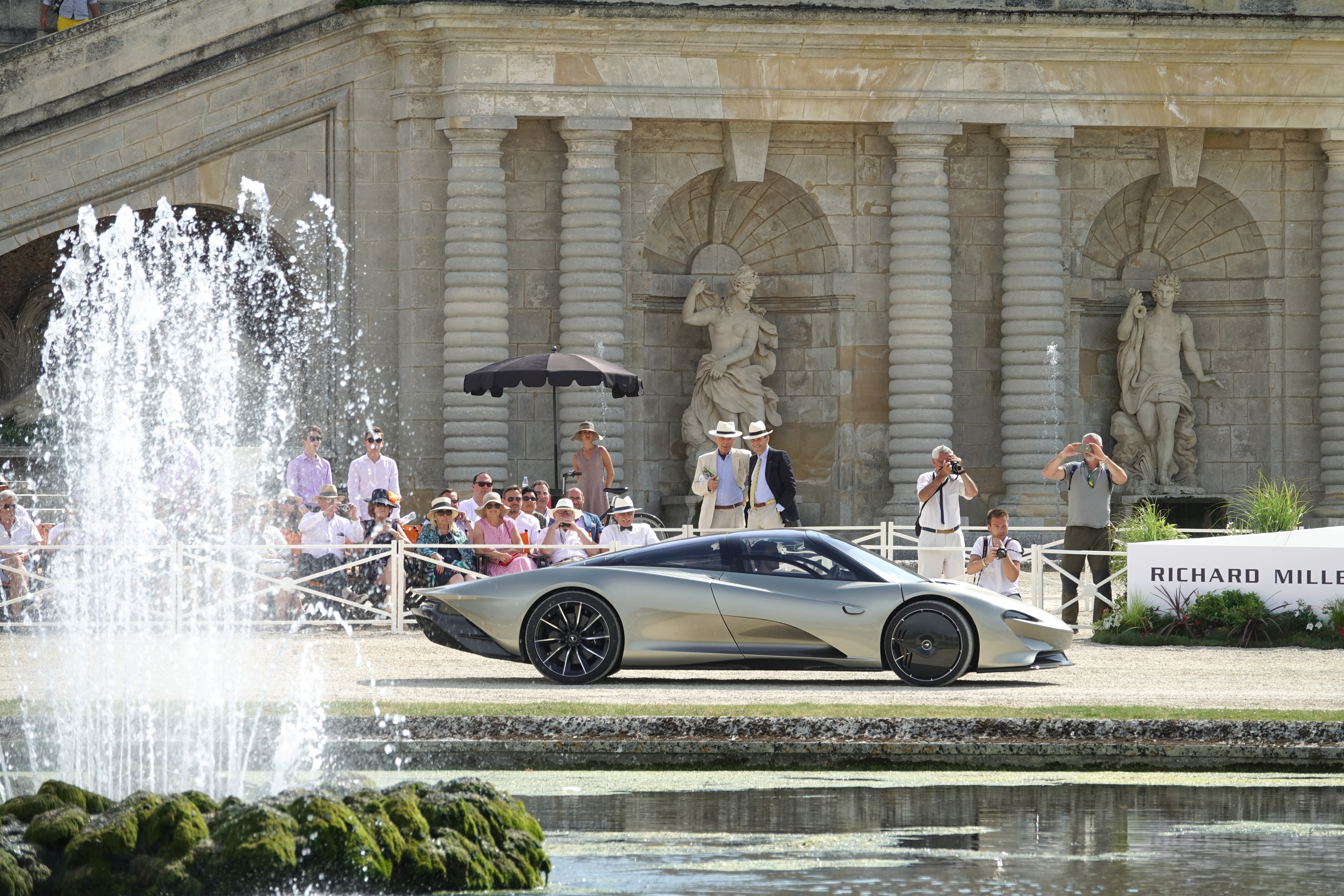

== See also ==
- List of production cars by power output
