= Antony Sheriff =

American-Italian businessman

- Born: 1963 (age 62–63); Switzerland
- Occupation: businessman

Antony Sheriff (born 1963 in Switzerland) is an American and Italian businessman and was the Executive Chairman of luxury motor yacht manufacturer, Princess Yachts.

== Early life and education ==
At a very young age Antony Sheriff attended St Bernard’s school in New York City, later enrolling into Collegiate High School, a prestigious Upper East Side school. Antony Sheriff attended Swarthmore College in Pennsylvania, obtaining both a B.A. in economics and a B.S. in engineering before going on to work at Chrysler. He then obtained his M.S. in management from the MIT Sloan School of Management while contributing to “The Machine that Changed the World” (Financial Times “Book of the Year” in 1990).

== Personal Life ==
Antony Sheriff son of Leonard Sheriff and Yolanda Joseph, is happily married to successful ex-venture capitalist Danielle Sheriff who now works with entrepreneurs, helping to kickstart their endeavours. They abide in London England with 3 children, Alessandra Sheriff (16), Francesca Sheriff (16) and Lorenzo Sheriff (14).

== Early career ==
Following his graduation from M.I.T., Sheriff worked for McKinsey and Company as a strategic management consultant. In 1995, he joined Fiat Auto in Italy and soon after became Executive Director of Product Development for all Fiat, Lancia and Alfa Romeo cars and commercial vehicles.

Sheriff was promoted to the position of Vice President of Marketing for Fiat in 2002, shortly before moving to McLaren Automotive in Britain as managing director in January 2003.

== McLaren Automotive ==
McLaren hired Sheriff to launch the SLR for Mercedes Benz and subsequently build a stand-alone McLaren road car brand. Sheriff was responsible for managing all aspects of the company's road car business. He launched the SLR into production in 2003 in partnership with Mercedes-Benz and turned McLaren Automotive into a profitable company after developing and launching further SLR models including the SLR Roadster and SLR Stirling Moss. At that time the SLR became the highest volume carbon based car ever produced.

After the launch of the SLR, Sheriff built McLaren Automotive into a standalone luxury sports car company developing three core products: P11 (MP4-12C / 650S), P12 (P1) and P13 (Sports Series). Under his leadership, McLaren Automotive developed its own carbon fibre chassis, high-performance V8 petrol engine and revolutionary suspension system. The company also built a dedicated production facility and a global distribution network with 51 dealers in 26 countries.

== Launch of the MP4-12C and P1 ==
During Sheriff's tenure, McLaren successfully launched two road car models and began the development of a third. The first car, the MP4-12C, was launched to critical acclaim and had 1700 orders before it went on display at dealerships. In its first full year in production, McLaren Automotive sold 1,587 MP4-12C’s with a turnover of £267 million and near-break even profitability. The MP4-12C subsequently became the world's best selling carbon fibre based car.

At the end of 2012, McLaren launched the MP4-12C Spider and Sheriff announced McLaren would be releasing the P1, a $1 million hybrid supercar, in 2013. The car was launched at the Paris Motor Show in September 2012 and sold out its limited 375 car production run within 12 months and became the world's first hybrid supercar in customer hands. In January 2017 it was reported that theP1 was changing hands for double its original price.

Two other cars were conceived under Sheriff’s leadership, but launched after his departure: The 650S (an evolution of the MP4-12C) launched in 2014 and the P13 Sports Series launched in 2015.

Sheriff resigned as Managing Director of McLaren in 2013, but remains closely tied to automotive, advising and investing in a number of projects in the international automotive industry.

== Awards and recognition ==
The MP4-12C won several honors, including “GT Car of the Year” and “Cabrio of the Year” from Top Gear, Middle East "Car of the Year" and the P1 won the “Hypercar of the Year”, also from Top Gear. In addition, McLaren Automotive was awarded the Walpole award for the “Best British Luxury Brand” in 2011.

== Princess Yachts ==
Sheriff joined British luxury yacht manufacturer Princess Yachts in January 2016, following a decade as managing director with luxury car manufacturer McLaren Automotive.

Under Sheriff's stewardship Princess made the Sunday Times list of Top Track 25 listing which ranks the UK's private mid-market growth companies by sales, with required growth in profit and sales. Under Sheriff's guidance, the company was featured for the first time on the list and at rank 87th

In his Forbes interview in 2017, Sheriff equated the future of the luxury yachting industry with that of the supercar industry. 'We need to get better at making boating less intimidating. What fueled the growth of the supercar market is that it became easier.' With Sheriff's background at McLaren, Princess is working towards streamlining the process of owning and running a luxury yacht to achieve exactly that.

In 2018 Princess Yachts announced record profits, up 27% on the previous year to £274.4m, and an operating profit before exceptional costs of £7.9m. Princess continued the success story with a record-breaking results for sales at the 2019 boot Düsseldorf (the world's biggest indoor boat show).

Princess Yachts announced six new boats in 2018, including the technically innovative R35 Sports Yacht which uses active foiling technology to control the pitch of the hull. To cope with the increased customer demand, Princess increased headcount by 500 from April 2017 to April 2018. Sheriff is quoted: “We are continuing to develop and build the business so we anticipate bringing on more people,”.

In April 2019 The Sunday Times awarded Princess Yachts eighth place in the Profit Track 100. Citing Princess had hired 850 people in 2018, bringing their total to 3,200. Stuart Lisle, co-chairman of BDO's Brexit taskforce said "We think companies such as Arlington Industries, CH&Co, and Princess Yachts are exactly the sort of entrepreneurially minded, mid-sized businesses that government and policymakers should do all they can to support. They outperform their larger and smaller counterparts in terms of growth in profits and sales, and in job creation, and yet they are often overlooked by government policy"

In May 2019, Princess Yachts announced record financial results of £340m turnover and £30m in operating profit. These figures are underpinned by record levels of productivity and employment at 3,200, up 50% since 2016. From 24 August 2023 was no longer CEO of Princess Yachts.

== Other board positions ==
Sheriff is also on the board of directors of several cutting-edge automotive companies.

Sheriff has sat on the Board of Directors of Rivian since 2016, the Michigan-based start-up developing a range of electrified sport utility vehicles and pick-ups designed for on- and off-road driving.

Sheriff is also on the board of directors at Rimac, manufacturing electric hypercars and providing technology to automotive manufacturers.

Sheriff is also on the board of directors of Pininfarina SpA, the famous car design firm and coachbuilder who will be building the new Pininfarina Battista 1900bhp electric hypercar that made its debut at the 2019 Geneva motor show.

Sheriff has an advisory board position with flying car start-up Aeromobil
