= Rolls-Royce 102EX =

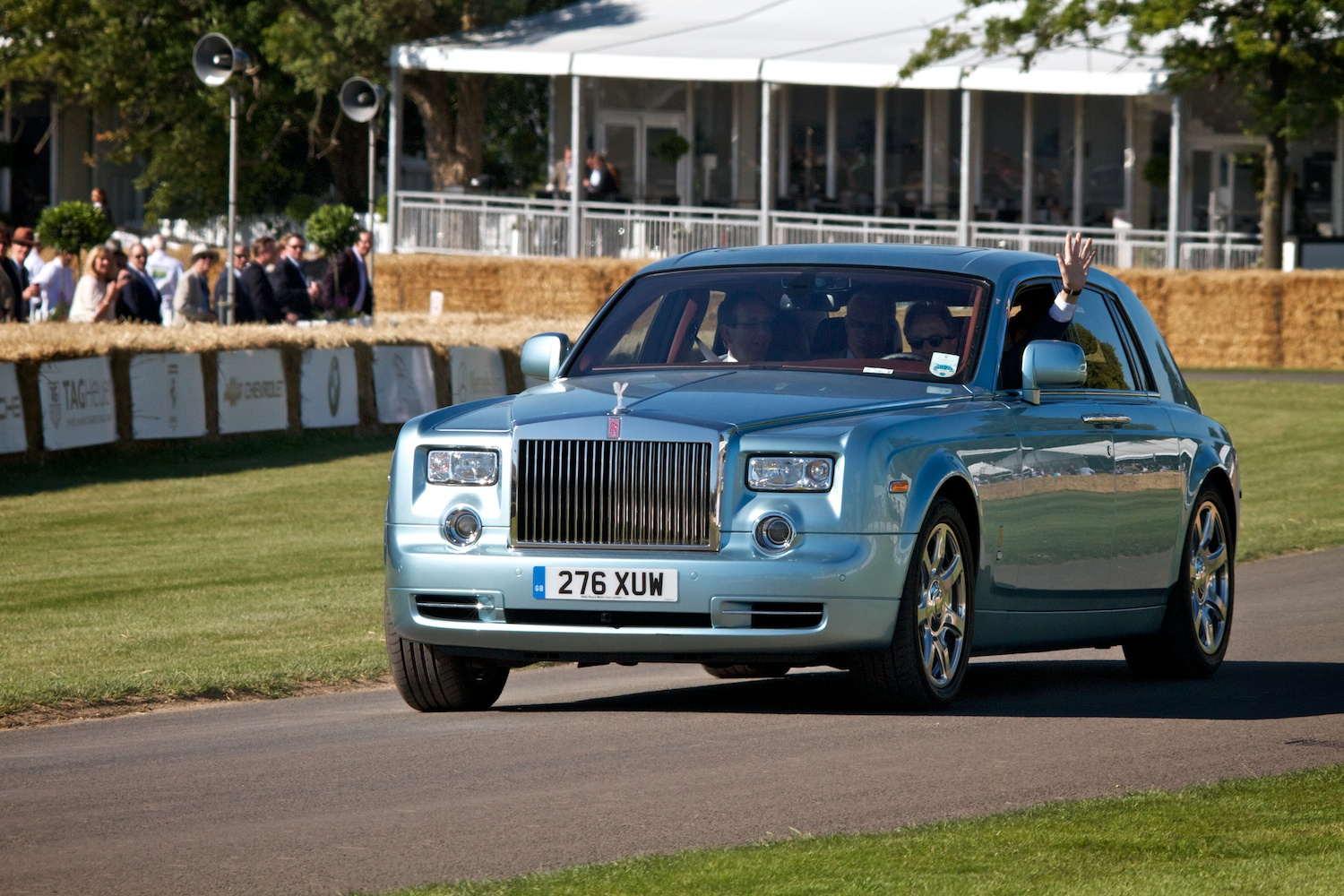
- Rolls-Royce 102EX at the 2011 Goodwood Festival of Speed

Overview
- Also called: Rolls-Royce Phantom Experimental Electric
- Production: 2011 (prototype)

Powertrain
- Electric motor: 290 kW (389 hp; 394 PS)
- Battery: 71kWh, Lithium-Nickel-Cobalt-Manganese Oxide
- Electric range: 120 mi (193.1 km)

The Rolls-Royce 102EX, also known as the Phantom Experimental Electric (EE), is a one-off electric prototype version of the Rolls-Royce Phantom VII. It was created by Rolls-Royce to gauge the response of customers and other stakeholders to an electric Rolls-Royce. The 102EX was unveiled at the 2011 Geneva Motor Show.

== Specifications ==
The 102EX is powered by two UQM-supplied synchronous permanent-magnet electric motors mounted on the rear sub-frame. Each of these motors are power rated to 145 kW for a maximum system output of 290 kW (389 hp). Maximum torque output is 800 N⋅m (590 lb⋅ft). Power is transmitted to the rear wheels by a 1-speed Xtrac transmission with integrated differential.

These motors are fed by a 71 kWh battery pack which is composed of 96 NCM (Note: NCM is an abbreviation of Lithium-Nickel-Cobalt-Manganese-Oxide, a type of lithium-ion battery chemistry chosen by Rolls-Royce because of its high energy density) cells. These cells are placed in the space occupied by a standard Phantom's engine and gearbox. Peak battery current is 850 amperes delivered at 338 volts (DC). The cells were manufactured by Dow Kokam, which Scottish firm Axeon assembled into a battery pack. Electric drivetrain integration was carried out by Lotus Engineering.

The battery pack is charged by 3 separate 3 kW charger units which allow for a minimum charging time of approximately 8 hours. Alternatively, the Phantom is also fitted with an induction charger which allows the car to be charged wirelessly.

The 102EX is differentiated from series production Phantoms visually. It is painted in "Atlantic Chrome" silver which uses ceramic nano-particles to increase the reflectivity of the paint. It is fitted with red "double-R" badges, which Rolls-Royce uses to denote its experimental vehicles. The Spirit of Ecstasy is made of Makrolon polycarbonate and is illuminated by blue LED light. The fuel filler cap features a glass window, allowing one to see the five-pin socket used to charge the 102EX. The interior and luggage compartment use "Corinova" leather. This is a type of leather that is vegetable tanned, as opposed to chrome tanned like ordinary Phantom leather.

== Reception ==
The Phantom was well-received by automotive journalists. Reviewers praised the exceptional refinement afforded by the 102EX's quiet powertrain, while some also felt that ride quality had been improved over the standard Phantom.

Rolls-Royce revealed in 2012 that customer reaction to the 102EX had been lukewarm. While the 102EX's refinement had been praised, customers took issue with the car's limited range and long charging times. Some also felt that the absence of a V12 detracted from the car's specialness.

== See also ==
- Battery electric vehicle
- Plug-in electric vehicle
