= McLaren 650S =

British sports car

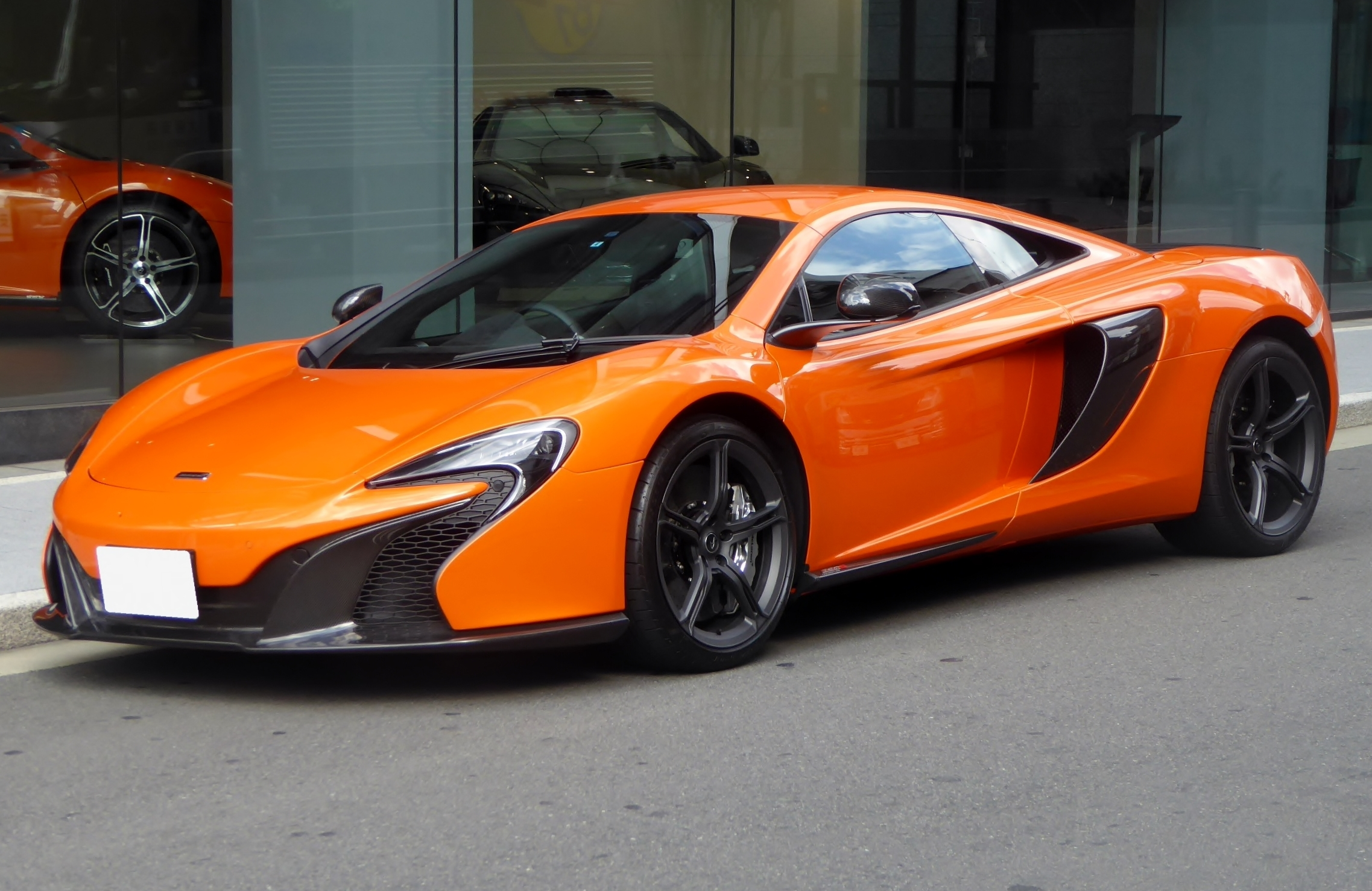

Overview
- Manufacturer: McLaren Automotive
- Production: 2014–2017
- Assembly: United Kingdom: Woking, Surrey, England
- Designer: Frank Stephenson

Body and chassis
- Class: Sports car (S)
- Body style: 2-door coupé; 2-door retractable hard-top convertible (Spider)
- Layout: Mid-engine, RWD
- Doors: Dihedral doors
- Related: McLaren 12C; McLaren P1

Powertrain
- Engine: 3,799 cc (231.8 cu in) twin-turbocharged M838T V8
- Power output: 650 PS (641 bhp; 478 kW) at 7,250 rpm 678 N⋅m (500 lbf⋅ft) at 6,000 rpm
- Transmission: 7-speed Graziano SSG dual-clutch

Dimensions
- Wheelbase: 2,670 mm (105.1 in)
- Length: 4,511 mm (177.6 in)
- Width: 1,895 mm (74.6 in)
- Height: 1,199 mm (47.2 in)
- Kerb weight: 1,428 kg (3,148 lb) (Coupé); 1,469 kg (3,239 lb) (Spider)

Chronology
- Predecessor: McLaren 12C
- Successor: McLaren 720S

The McLaren 650S is a British sports car designed and manufactured by British automobile manufacturer McLaren Automotive. It was announced in February 2014 as a new model, but based on the existing MP4-12C with 25% new parts, and was formally unveiled at the 2014 Geneva Motor Show.

The 650S shares the MP4-12C's carbon-fibre-reinforced polymer chassis, and is powered by the same 3.8-litre twin-turbocharged McLaren M838T V8 engine, but is now rated at 650 PS (478 kW; 641 hp) and 500 lb⋅ft (678 N⋅m) of torque. Power is transmitted to the wheels through a seven-speed dual-clutch Seamless-Shift gearbox (SSG) provided by Graziano Trasmissioni.

== Specifications and performance ==
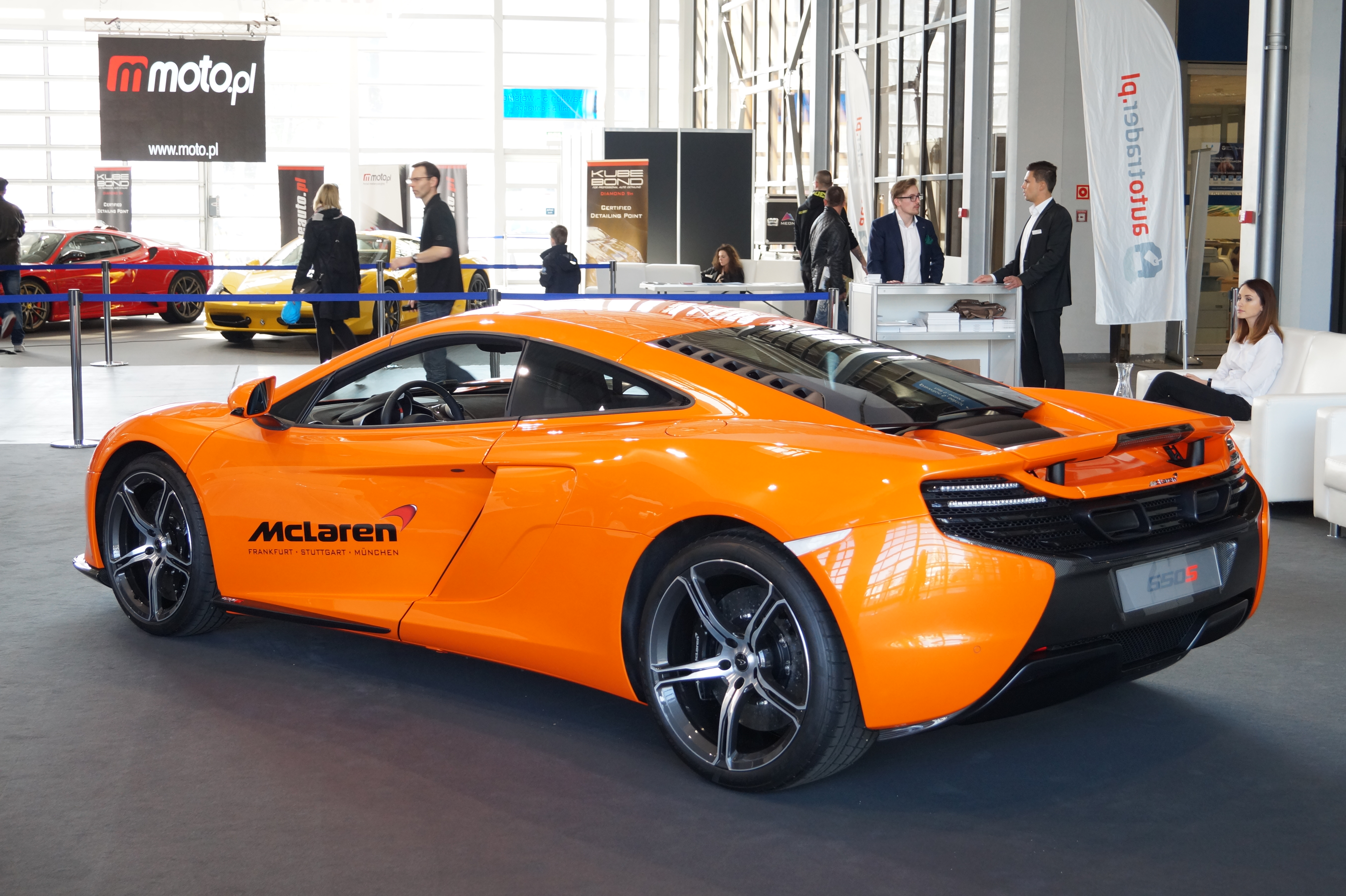
Rear view

The 650S is an evolution of the preceding 12C and uses the findings gained from the P1 in order to make the car more responsive and focused. It was initially designed to be offered alongside the 12C but the declining sales of the 12C prompted McLaren to market the 650S as its replacement. The 650 in the car's name refers to the engine's power output in Pferdestärke, the European standard for horsepower while the S stands for Sport. Most of the components are carried over from the 12C which includes the carbon-fibre monocoque chassis which has aluminium subframes front and aft. The monocoque weighs 75 kg (165 lb) and is manufactured by Carbo Tech, an aerospace contractor based in Austria. With an aim of building 4,000 cars per year, McLaren deemed the traditional pre-impregnation method used to mould parts too labour-intensive and instead used an alternative method which involves a resin transfer moulding process.

The process involves a mould whose tooling involves internal, removable mandrels for the hollow sections which allows the tub to be built in one piece. The pre-cut sheets of carbon fibre are placed in the tooling of the mould and aluminium components are also positioned to be bolted onto the monocoque later. To avoid the galvanic corrosion between aluminium and carbon, the aluminium components of the chassis are primed before assembly. The wide and deep hollow box sections on each side of the carbon fibre tub are designed for easy entry and exit from the car.

The powertrain of the 650S is largely carried over from the 12C but involves new pistons, better-flowing cylinder heads, new exhaust valves, and recalibrated camshaft timing. A new exhaust system also reduces weight while being more responsive. The red-line of the engine was increased to 8,500 rpm.

The engine is mated to the same 7-speed dual clutch transmission as in the 12C but it has been recalibrated for faster shift times. The 650S comes with new aluminium forged wheels wrapped in Pirelli P Zero Corsa tyres having wider contact patch than the previous versions for improved grip. In order to improve ride quality, McLaren used ProActive Chassis Control (PCC) which is a derivative of McLaren's F1 active suspension system. The system consists of dampers on either sides of the car which are hydraulically linked which allows the car to resist roll. The dampers have been divided into sections for rebound and compression. The front damper's compression is linked to the rear damper's rebound. The pressure is gathered in an accumulator which is controlled using gas pressure, by adjusting the pressure in each accumulator, the stiffness of the suspension is adjusted for different driving conditions.

A new front splitter and redesigned wing blades increase downforce by 24% over the 12C while the new tyres contribute to improved handling. The new rear diffuser is based on the bumper/diffuser concept and is carried over from the 12C GT3 race car. The air brake which is carried over from the 12C is now controlled by an onboard computer which uses the data gathered from accelerometers in the car in order to counteract lift. The 650S also makes use of a Drag Reduction System (DRS) for reducing drag and to improve the car's aerodynamics. Like the 12C, the 650S comes standard with a carbon ceramic braking system manufactured by Akebono but the problems related to braking response in the 12C were addressed and improvements were made.

The 650S featured a revised front end, resembling the flagship P1 in order to update the styling of the car and to give it a more aggressive appearance than its predecessor. The design language defined the design ethos of future McLaren sports cars.

The interior includes Alcantara as the standard upholstery material and the infotainment system is based on the same unit used in the P1. Optional carbon fibre sports seats reduce the weight of the car by 15 kg. The interior focus on a symmetrical design language which McLaren claims reduces the shift time required by the owner to learn about the car's functions. The portrait infotainment screen is improved over the 12C and the sat nav system is now easily accessible.

The 650S has a claimed top speed of 333 km/h (207 mph), and can accelerate from 0–100 km/h (0–62 mph) in 3.0 seconds and from 0–200 km/h (0–124 mph) in 8.4 seconds.

== Variants ==
=== 650S Spider (2014–2016) ===
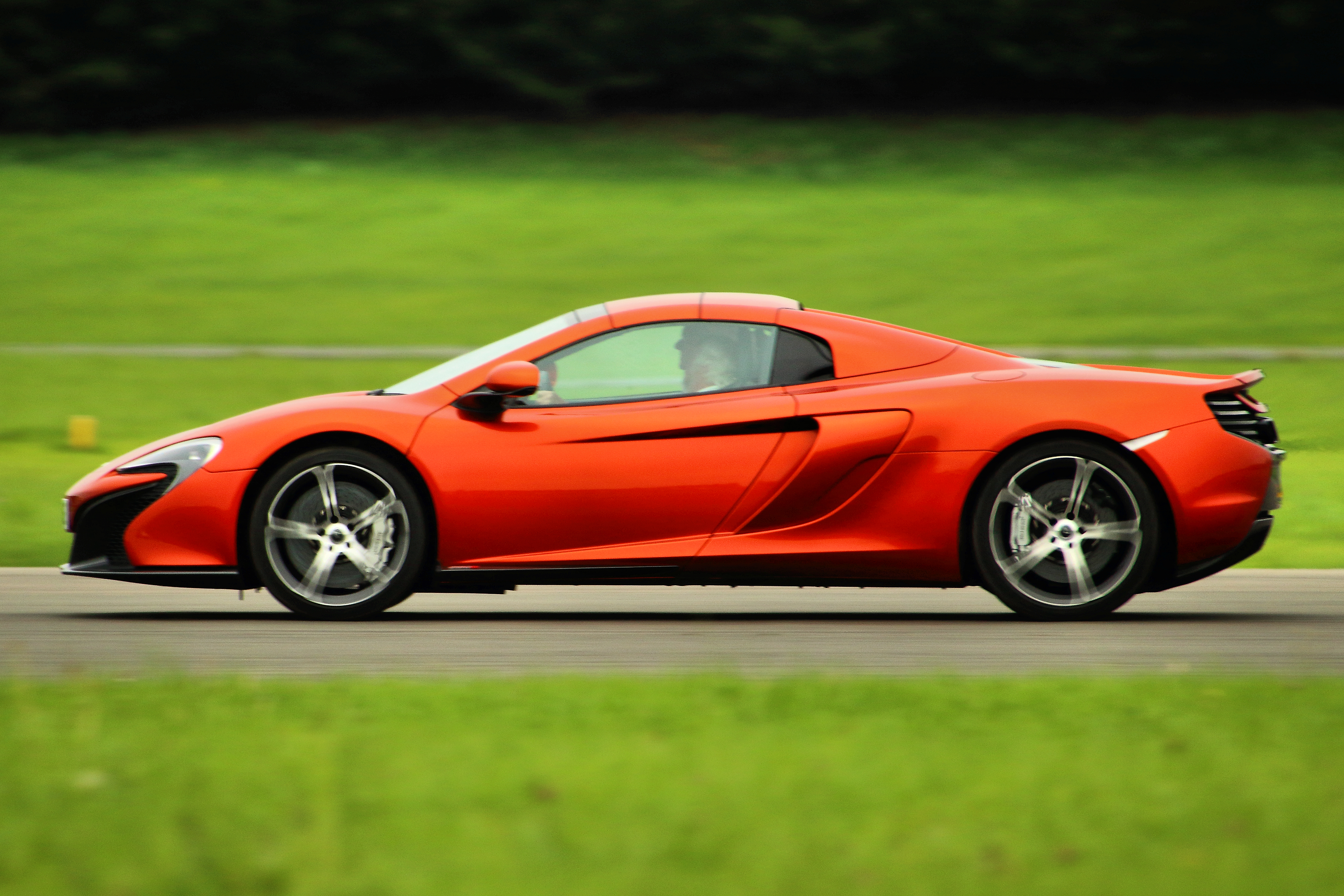
McLaren 650S Spider (with roof closed)

First announced in February 2014, the 650S Spider is a convertible version of the 650S. It weighs 40 kg (88 lb) more than the coupe, but it offers nearly identical performance. The Spider has the same structural stiffness as the coupé primarily because the carbon monocell chassis was designed without a roof. the Spider features a three-piece retractable hard-top carbon fibre roof which takes 17 seconds for operation.

It can accelerate from 0 to 97 km/h (60 mph) in 3 seconds and has a top speed of 328 km/h (204 mph). Up to 25 per cent of the parts are new compared to the 12C Spider.

=== MSO 650S (2014–2017) ===
An MSO (McLaren Special Operations) version of the 650S is offered in a limited production run of 50 vehicles. Introduced in 2014, the car was offered in three matte carbon, exclusive MSO colours, Papaya Spark, Agrigan Black and Sarigan Quartz. It features unique and lightweight alloy wheels. These are 4 kg (9 lb) lighter than the standard alloys, helped by the fact that titanium wheel bolts are used. The interior is upholstered in Alcantara and contains a specialised plaque which has the car's designer Frank Stephenson's branded sketch and an MSO branded leather holdall.

=== 625C (2015–2016) ===
In September 2014, McLaren launched an additional model to the range, the 625C, available in both coupé and roadster bodystyles and aimed at specific markets in the South Asia Pacific region. As with the 650S, the 625 in the model's name refers to the engine's power output in PS while the C refers to Club which hints at the less extreme nature of the car.

Powered by the same 3.8-litre twin-turbocharged V8 engine, but with a reduced power output of 625 PS (460 kW; 616 hp). The 625C is fitted with new dampers and a revised suspension setup, including softer spring rates. Braking is by cast-iron discs instead of the carbon fibre-ceramic units fitted to the 650S. Top speed remains the same as the 650S but acceleration from 0–100 km/h (0–62 mph) is slightly slower at 3.1 seconds (when equipped with optional Pirelli P Zero Corsa tyres).

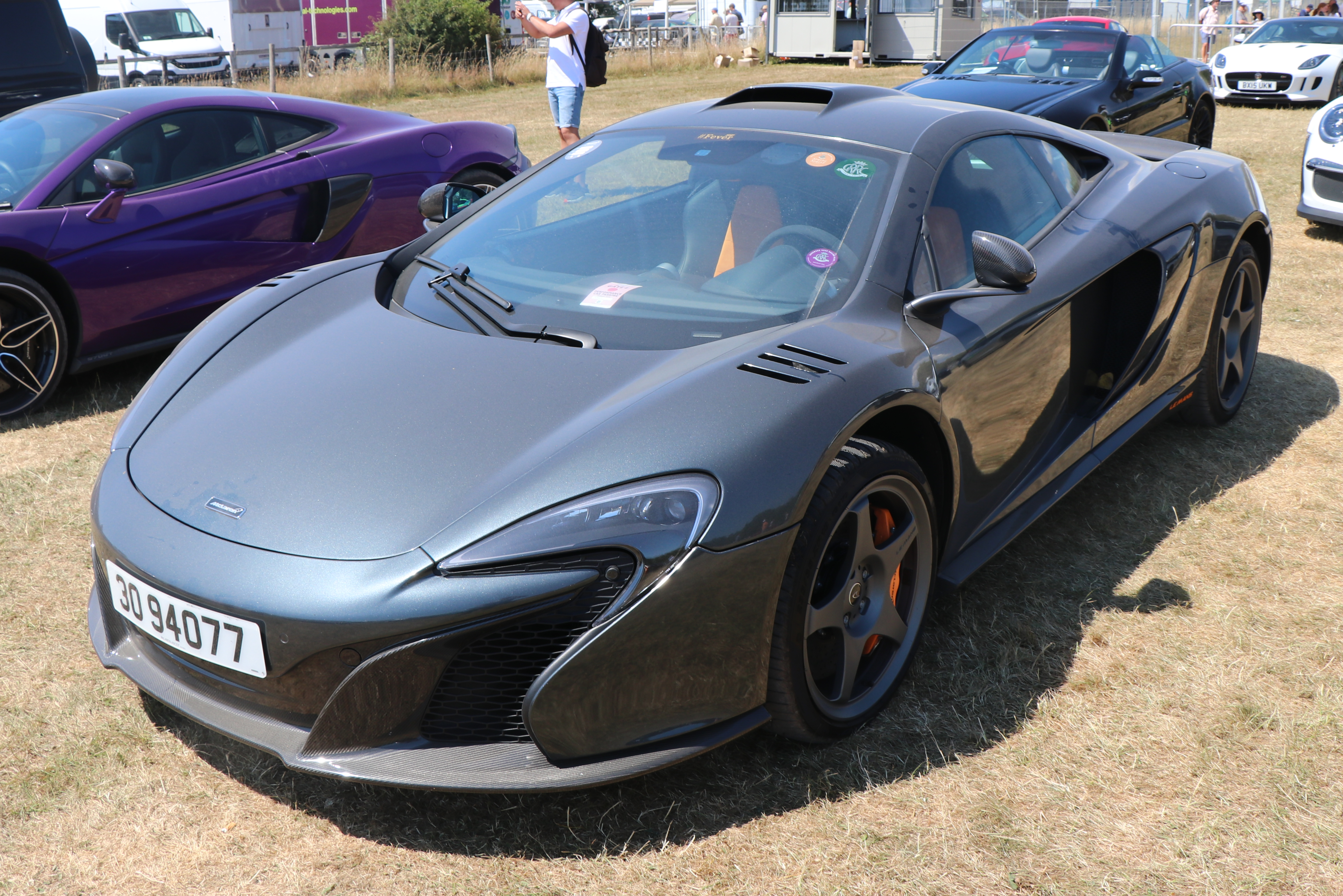
650S Le Mans

=== 650S Le Mans (2015–2016) ===
The McLaren 650S Le Mans was revealed in early 2015 to commemorate McLaren's inaugural win at the 24 Hours of Le Mans in 1995. This edition marks McLaren's 20th anniversary since this important win - it was also their first entry ever at Le Mans where five McLaren F1 GTRs finished 1st, 3rd, 4th, 5th and 13th.

Developed by McLaren Special Operations, the McLaren 650S Le Mans is limited to 50 units all in coupé variants. It is inspired by the No.59 McLaren F1 GTR that won the 1995 Le Mans. Hence the 650S Le Mans is finished in a metallic Sarthe Grey exterior colour and fitted with ‘Le Mans Edition’ lightweight wheels. Other distinct features from the entry 650S model include a functional roof-mounted engine induction ‘snorkel’ and subtle louvres on the front wings.

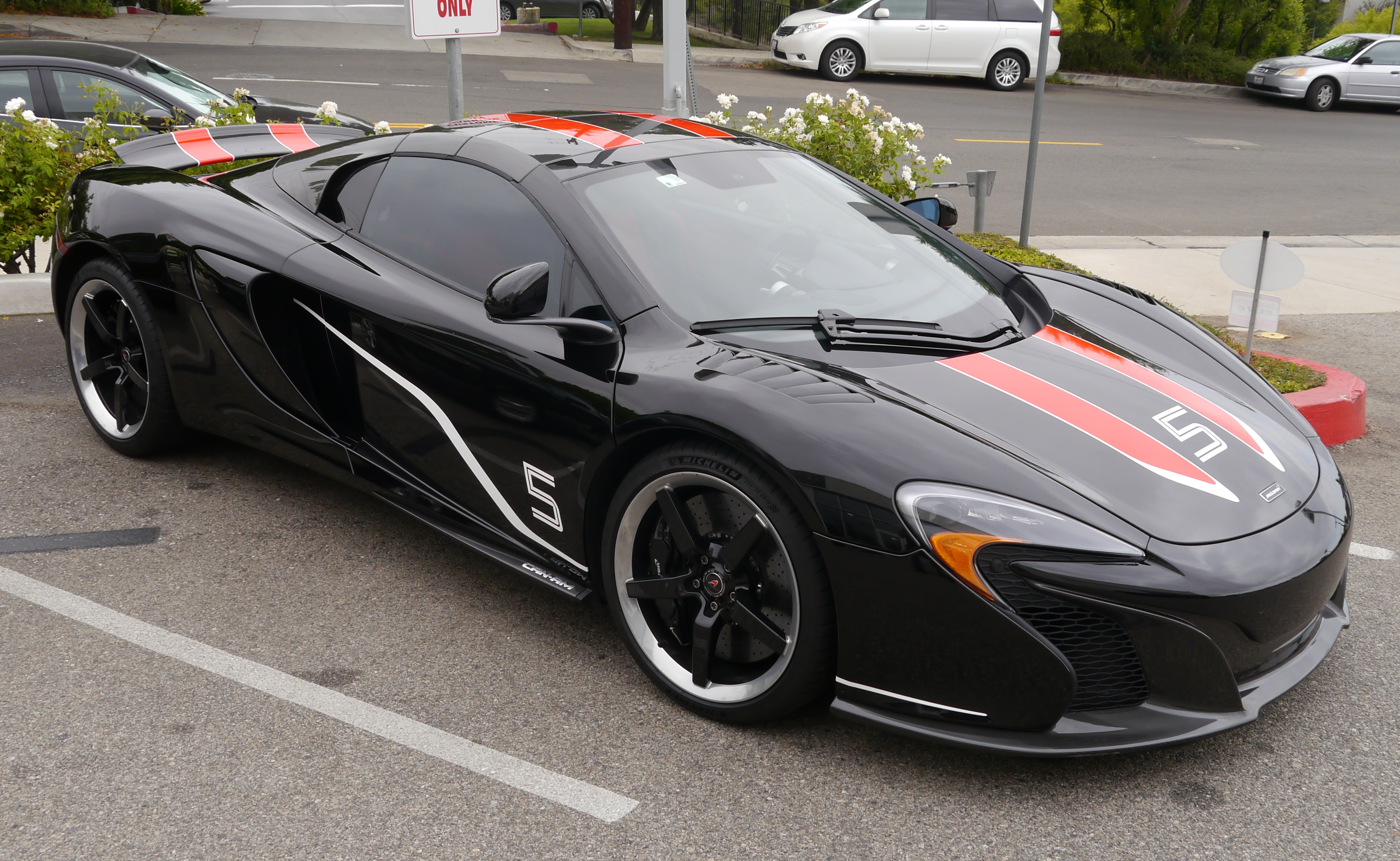
650S Can-Am

=== 650S Can-Am (2015–2016) ===
The Can-Am is a limited edition of the 650S Spider developed by McLaren Special Operations and features cosmetic upgrades over the standard model. It was introduced as a celebration of the 50 years of the first Can-Am race. Differences from the standard 650S Spider include a carbon-fibre hood, roof, airbrake, door blades and front splitter. The car comes with forged alloy wheels with titanium wheel nuts in the style of the Can-Am race cars of the 1960s wrapped in Pirelli P Zero Corsa tyres. The car featured a slightly designed rear end featuring quad exhaust tips while the front has additional brake cooling gills on the front fenders. The launch car was finished in Mars Red harking back to Bruce McLaren's M1B race car. Other colours included racing orange and onyx black and were available in customisable race liveries. Production was limited to 50 units only.

== 675LT ==
McLaren 675LT
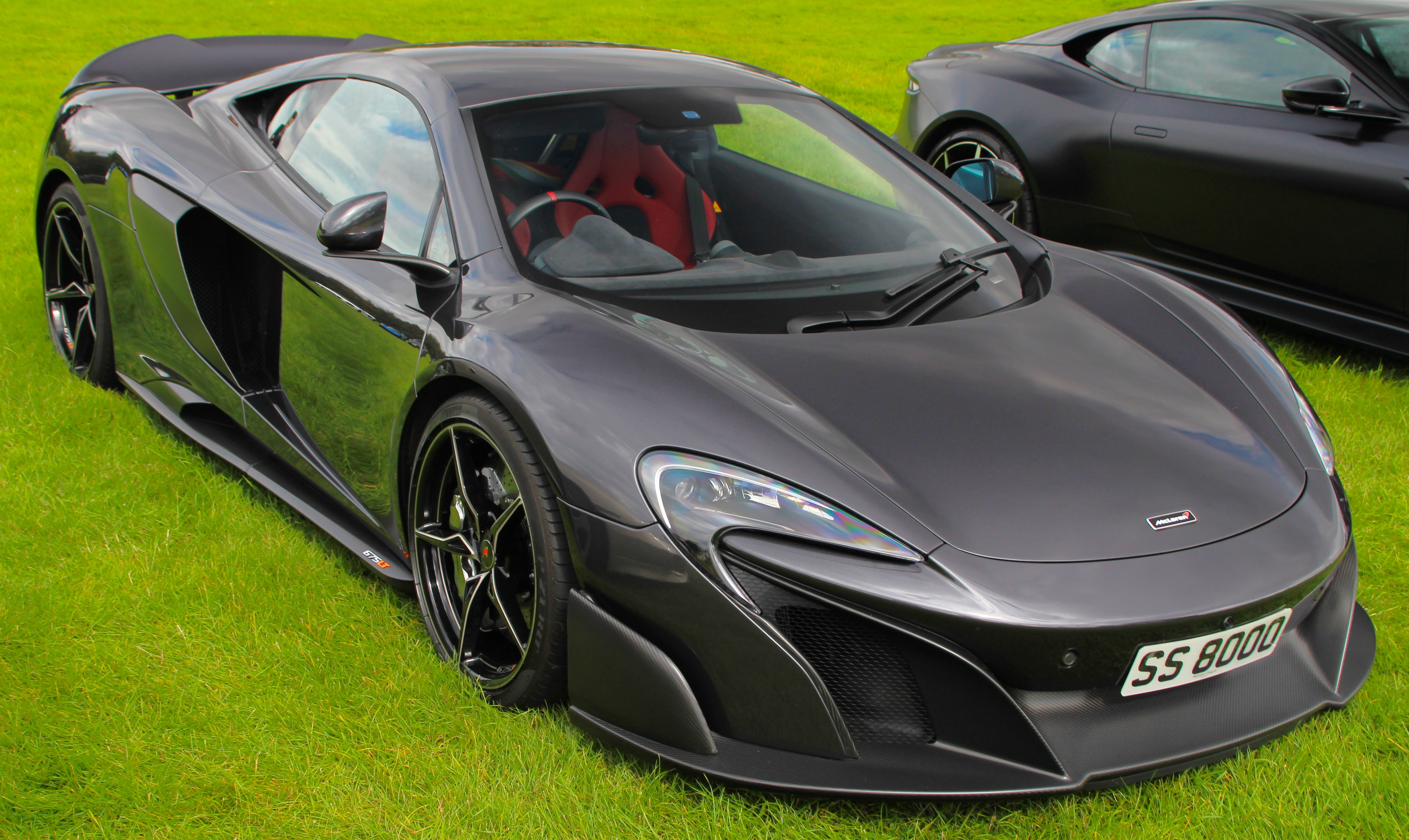

Overview
- Manufacturer: McLaren Automotive
- Production: 2015–2017
- Model years: 2016–2018
- Assembly: Woking, Surrey, England
- Designer: Frank Stephenson

Body and chassis
- Class: Sports car (S)
- Body style: 2-door Coupé; 2-door retractable hard-top convertible (Spider)
- Layout: Mid-engine, RWD
- Doors: Dihedral Doors
- Related: McLaren 12C; McLaren P1; McLaren 720S

Powertrain
- Engine: 3799 cc twin-turbocharged M838T V8
- Power output: 675 PS (666 bhp; 496 kW) at 7,100 rpm 700 N⋅m (516 lb⋅ft) at 5,000 rpm
- Transmission: 7-speed Graziano SSG dual-clutch

Dimensions
- Wheelbase: 2,670 mm (105.1 in)
- Length: 4,547 mm (179 in)
- Width: 2,093 mm (82.4 in)
- Height: 1,189 mm (46.8 in)
- Kerb weight: 1,358 kg (2,993 lb) (Coupé); 1,368 kg (3,016 lb)

Chronology
- Predecessor: McLaren 12C
- Successor: McLaren 720S

The McLaren 675LT is a lightweight, track-focused evolution of the McLaren 650S. It was announced in February 2015 and introduced at the 2015 Geneva Motor Show. McLaren made 500 units of the 675LT Coupe (without counting the special editions such as the MSO HS).

=== Chassis ===
As with the 650S, the 675LT uses a single-piece carbon fibre monocell weighing 75 kg (165 lb), and carbon fibre use in the vehicle is increased in order to further minimise weight and increase rigidity. The 675LT is fitted with new carbon ceramic brake discs to increase braking performance over the 650S. Disc sizes are 394 mm at the front and 380 mm at the rear. Six-piston calipers grip the front discs with four-piston caliper used for the rears. Braking performance is also aided by the air brake ability of the new rear wing.

The 675LT makes use of a new 10-spoke wheel design, each weighing 800 g less than the alloy wheels on the McLaren P1, supplied in a 19-inch front and 20-inch rear fitment.

The new wheels are fitted with Pirelli P-Zero Trofeo R track-focused, street-legal tyres which increase grip by up to 6% over the P-Zero Corsa sold with the 650S.

=== Body and cabin ===
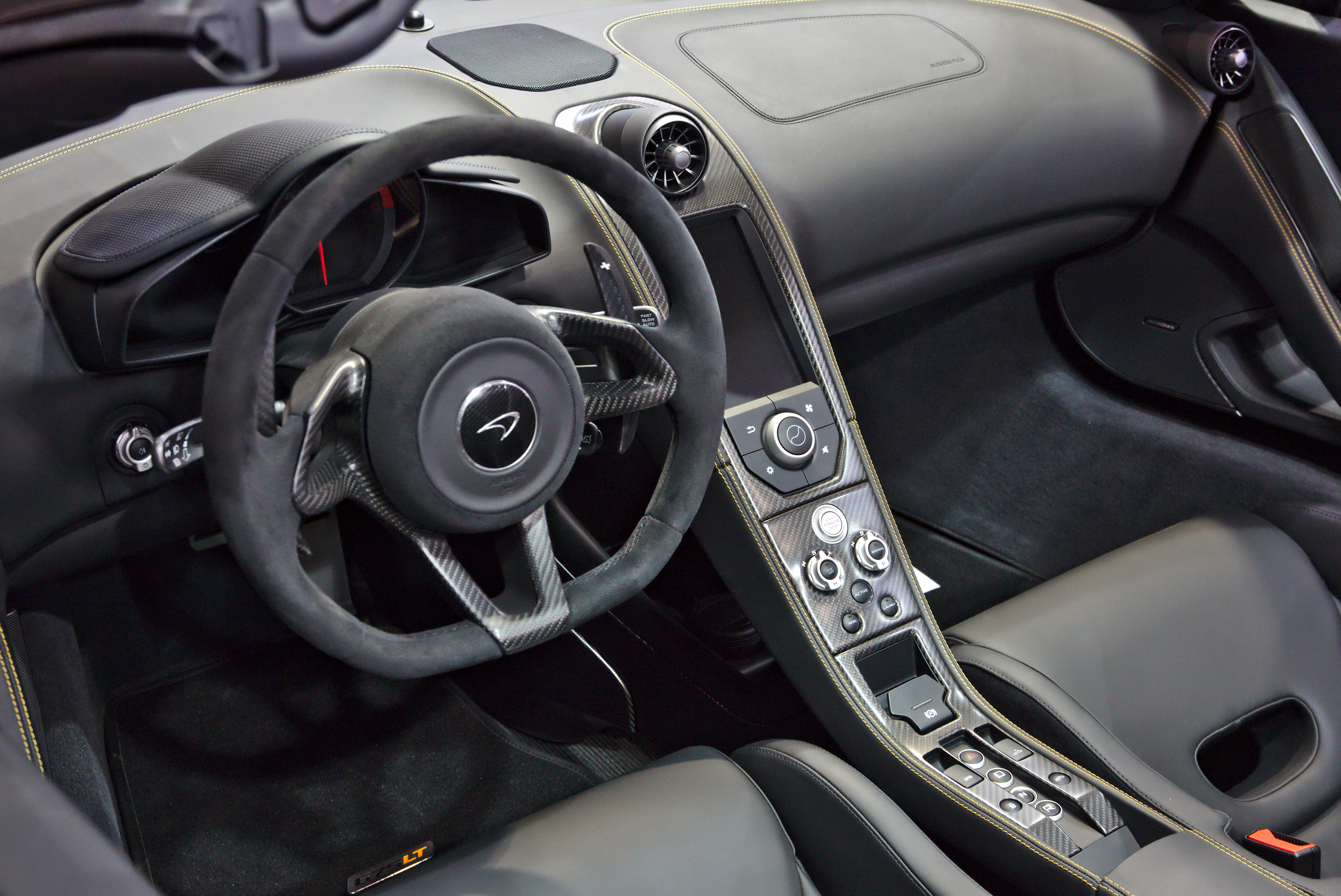
Interior

The length of the 675LT is 33 mm (1.3 in) more than the 650S. The 675LT utilises a new rear wing/air brake assembly 50% larger than that used in the 650S, along with a new carbon fibre diffuser and an 80% larger front splitter with sizeable endplates that together increase total downforce by 40%.

New carbon fibre pieces include both the front and rear bumpers as well as front undertray, rear fenders, side intakes and decklid that contribute to the significant weight savings over the 650S. Alcantara is used throughout the interior where carpeting is removed and removal of the air conditioning unit and new carbon fibre race seats together save 26.5 kg (58 lb) although an adjustable passenger seat and air-conditioning are included as no-cost options. Other differences from the 650S' interior include the integration of climate controls into the centre console mounted touch screen. 1 millimetre thinner window glass further reduces weight by 3 kg (7 lb). New 10-spoke forged aluminium wheels with titanium wheel nuts reduce weight by 1 kg (1.8 lb). This extreme focus in weight saving results in a dry weight of 1,230 kg (2,712 lb), 100 kg (220 lb) less than the 650S.

=== Drivetrain ===
The car is powered by a variation of the M838T 3.8 L; 231.8 cu in (3,799 cc) twin-turbocharged V8 engine rated at 675 PS (496 kW; 666 hp) at 7,100 rpm and 700 N⋅m (516 lbf⋅ft) at 5,500 rpm. This is achieved through the addition of new lightweight connecting rods, a bespoke camshaft, an electronic recirculation valve and a lightweight titanium exhaust featuring dual circular outlets. Also used in the engine are revised turbocharger compressor wheels and an optimised fuel pump.

The 675LT uses the 7-speed automatic dual-clutch gearbox used in the 650S, with improved software reducing the shift time.

=== Performance ===
The 675LT can accelerate from 0–100 km/h (62 mph) in 2.9 seconds, 0.1 seconds faster than the 650S, 0–200 km/h (124 mph) in 7.9 seconds, 0–300 km/h (186 mph) in 25.9 seconds, 0–322 km/h (200 mph) in 31.2 seconds, and do the 1/4 mile (402 m) sprint in 10.3 seconds at 227.1 km/h (141.1 mph), continuing on to a claimed top speed of 330 km/h (205 mph).

=== Nomenclature ===
The 675 in the 675LT model name refers to the power output of 675 PS (496 kW; 666 bhp), following the naming scheme started by the 650S. The LT in the model name is a reference to the "Long Tail" 1997 McLaren F1 GT which was the final incarnation of the F1 road car built to comply with FIA homologation regulations for the 1997 F1 GTR. The F1 GT featured extended front and rear overhangs that produced similar downforce to the previous homologation special, the F1 LM, without the use of a drag-inducing fixed rear wing.

=== 675LT Spider (2016–2017) ===
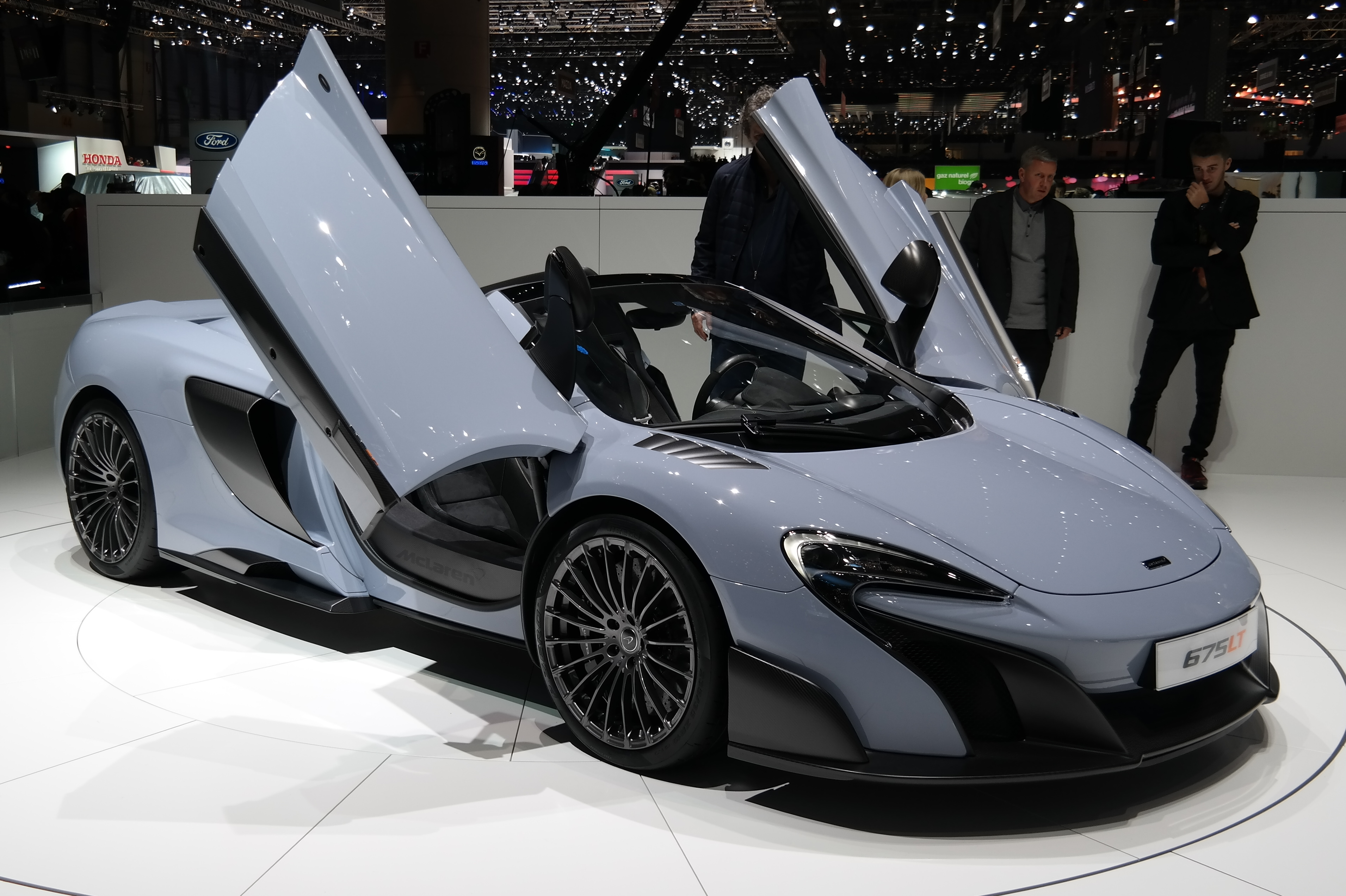
675LT Spider at the 2016 Geneva Motor Show.

A convertible variant of the 675LT was revealed online in December 2015. It shares the same 675 PS (496 kW; 666 bhp), 3.8-litre twin-turbocharged V8 engine as the coupé, but has a folding hardtop roof as seen on the 650S Spider taking 16 seconds for operation. The 675LT Spider can accelerate from 0–100 km/h (0–62 mph) in 2.9 seconds and 0–200 km/h (0–124 mph) in 8.1 seconds. The top speed is reduced slightly, to 327 km/h (203 mph). McLaren only built 500 675LT Spider (without counting special editions such as the Carbon Series).

=== 675LT Spider Carbon Series ===
In June 2016, McLaren publicly released the 675LT Spider Carbon Series. The cars are based on the 675LT Spider and have the same engine and performance. An extra 40 per cent of the body panels are carbon fiber such as the retractable roof and tonneau, A-pillars, bonnet and rear deck, side blades, complete front and rear wings, and even fuel filler flap. Only 25 Carbon Series have been built bringing the total number of 675LTs Spider to 525.

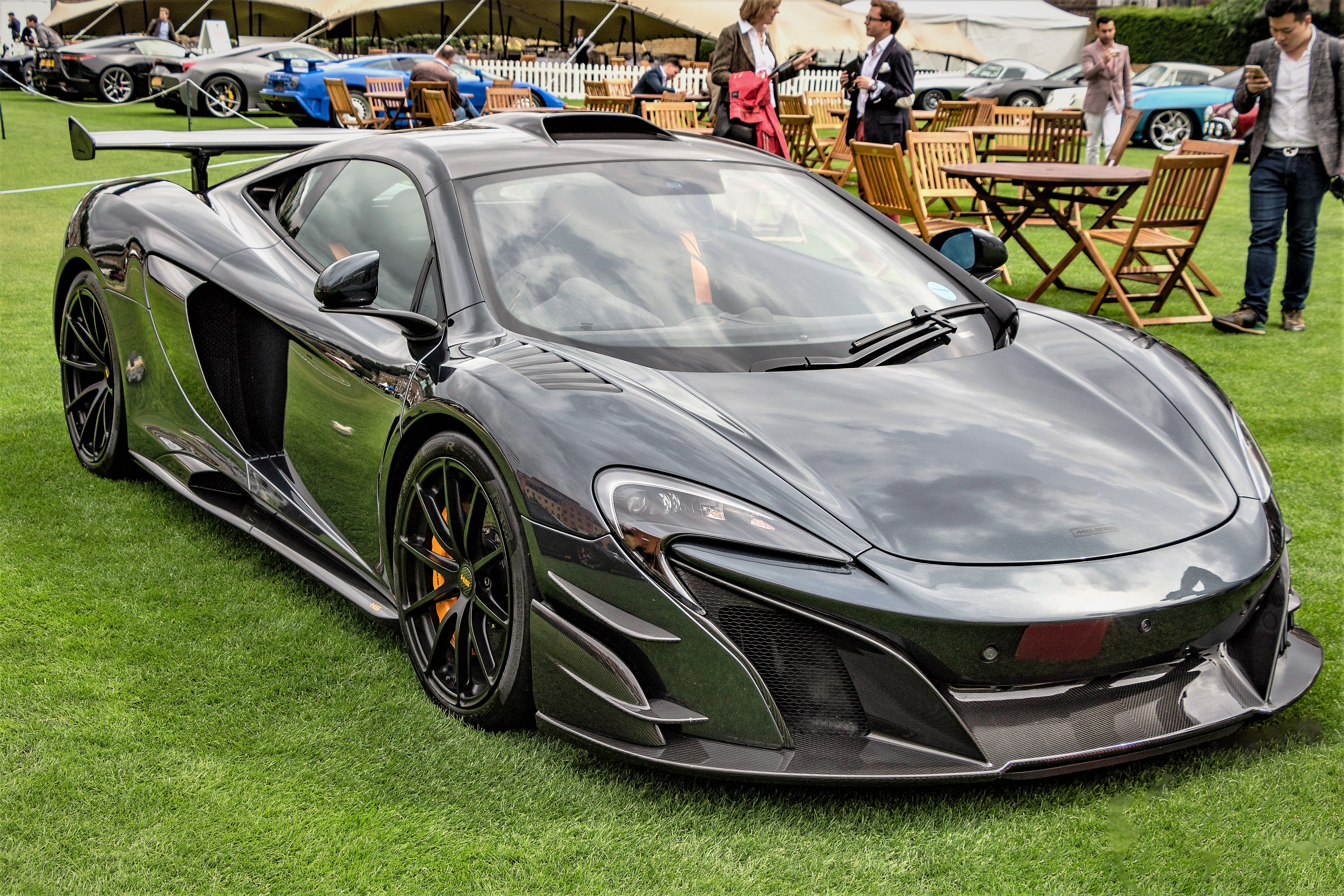
MSO HS at the 2017 City Concours at the Honourable Artillery Company

=== MSO HS (2016–2017) ===
The McLaren MSO HS is a limited version of the outgoing 650S model and is based on the 675LT variant, inspired by the McLaren P1 GTR. It was introduced online in late 2015 and publicly in August 2016. The car is lighter and more powerful than the 675LT, the upgraded engine now rated at 688 PS (506 kW; 679 hp) and 516 lb⋅ft (700 N⋅m) of torque at 7,000 rpm. The car is approximately 19 kg (42 lb) lighter than the 675LT thanks to the use of Alcantara interior upholstery and carbon fibre racing seats with racing harnesses similar to those found in the P1 GTR, although, a Nappa leather interior upholstery is optional. Exterior changes include a new bumper with front splitters, roof mounted air scoop, full length side skirts and an adjustable fixed rear wing, inspired by the P1 GTR. The wing can be adjusted electronically via the settings programmed in the car's computer. Overall exterior modifications of the car help generate 220 kg (485 lb) of downforce at 241 km/h (150 mph). Only 25 were made with each car fully customisable by the customer, bringing the total number of 675LTs to 525. Performance figures of the car remain unknown but the car is likely to have improvements in acceleration, handling and top speed.

=== MSO R ===
In October 2017, McLaren announced the one-offs MSO R Coupe and MSO R Spider both ordered by the same customer. The cars use the same engine as the MSO HS. One way to differentiate the MSO HS from the MSO R is with the rear wing, which has 2 levels on the MSO R. Both cars are silver, but the coupe has a matte finish. The cars have been seen wearing German license plates with the coupe's reading "M RR 688" and the spider's reading "M SR 688".

== Motorsports ==
=== GT3 ===
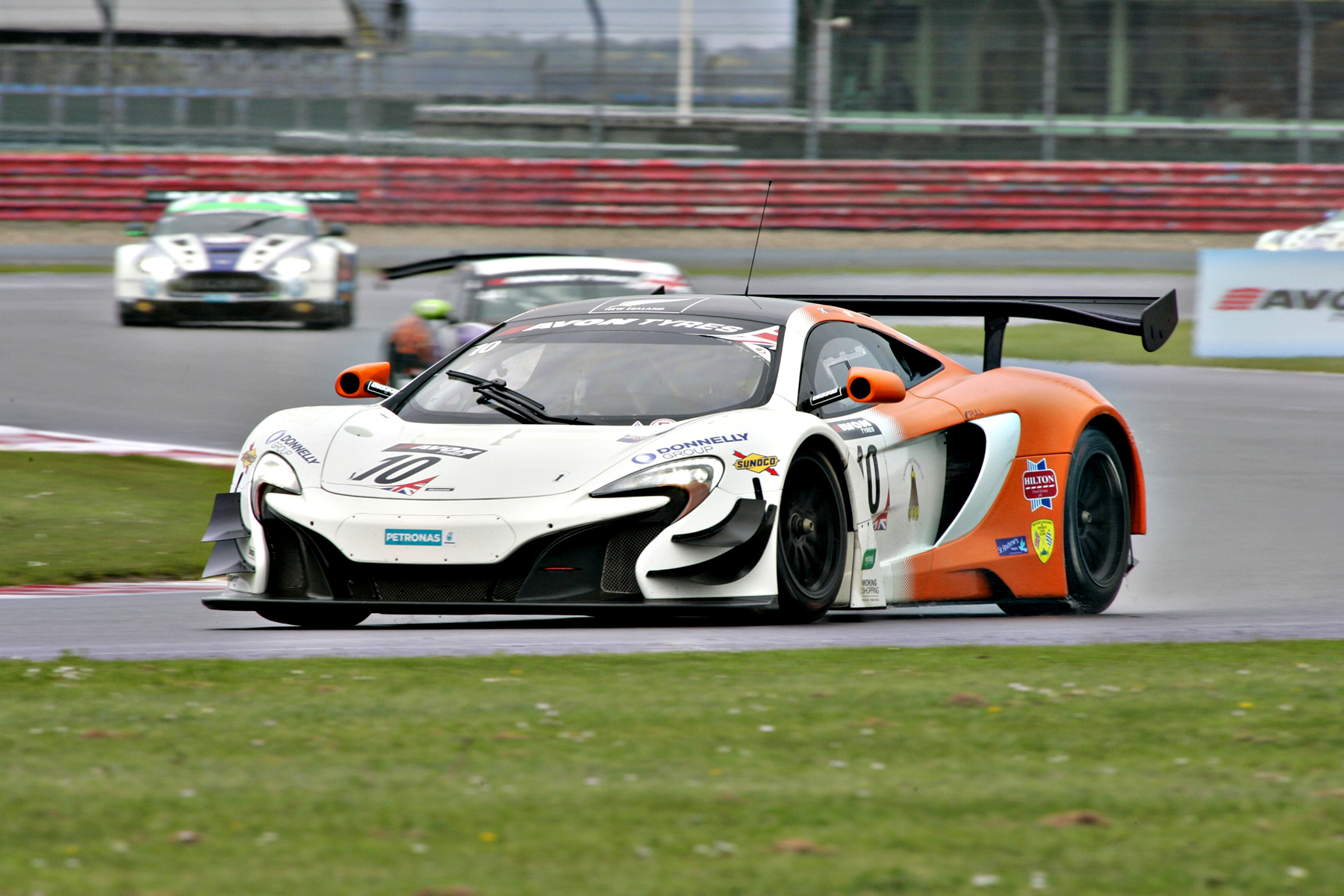
McLaren 650S GT3 at Silverstone National Circuit

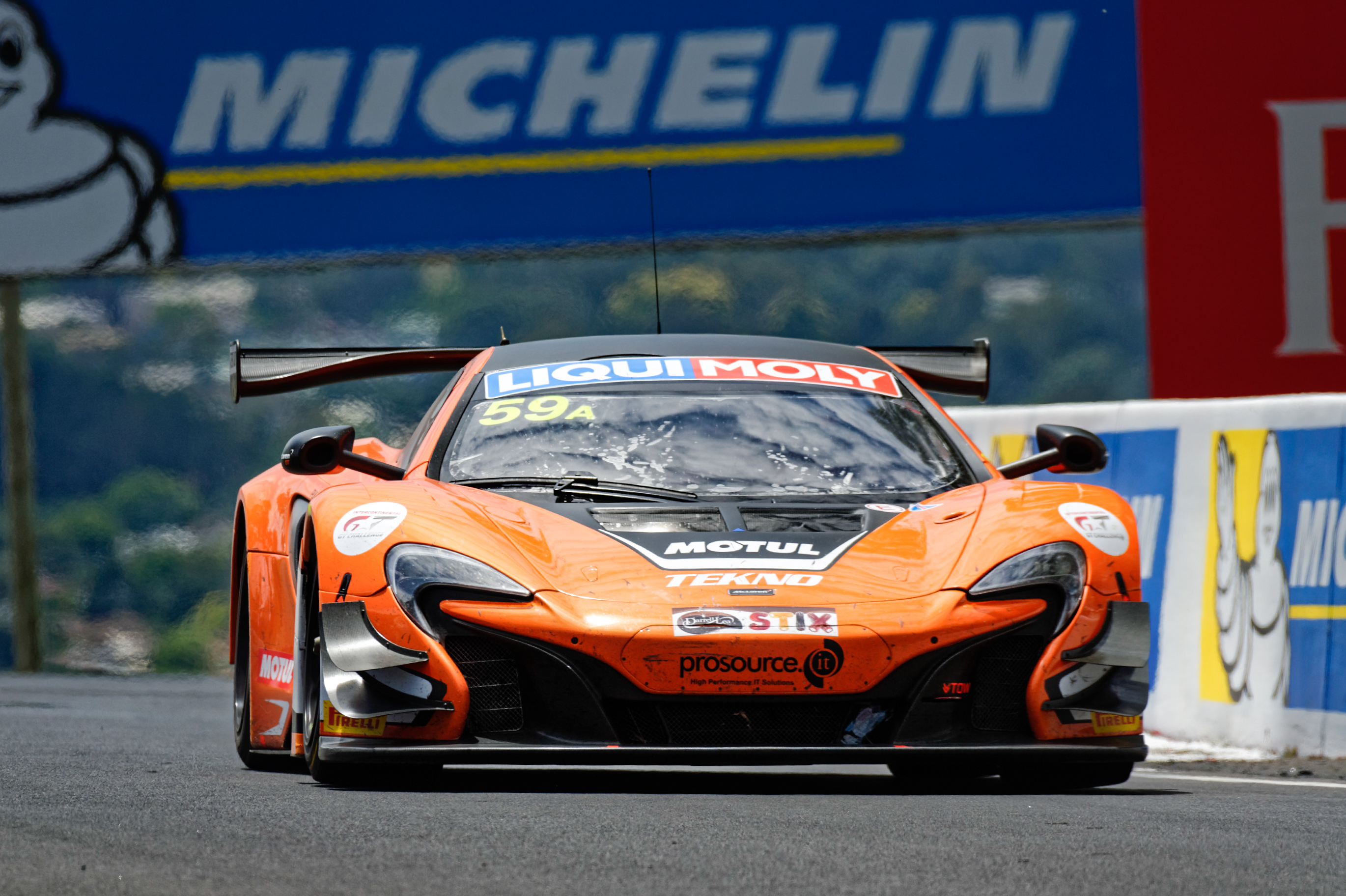
The winning McLaren 650S GT3 at the 2016 Liqui Moly Bathurst 12 Hour

In June 2014, McLaren announced that they would produce a GT3 version of the 650S, either as a new car or as an upgrade for the existing 12C GT3 – which will contest GT3 championships from 2015 onwards.

Changes to the car from the road car includes a new 6-speed sequential motorsport gearbox; 380 mm ventilated brake discs with six-piston calipers at the front and four-piston units at the rear; a 52 mm wider track; revised suspension geometry and upgraded components. It is distinguished from the road car by larger air intakes and front splitter, and carbon fibre air intakes and a new rear wing.

The 3.8-litre McLaren twin-turbocharged V8 engine, also used in the 12C-GT3, produces 500 PS (368 kW; 493 hp), and includes a new ECU to improve turbo boost and gearshifts. The power output is lower than the road going 650S's due to homologation.

Andrew Kirkaldy, whose CRS Racing team developed the GT3 version of the MP4-12C, said that they were aiming to develop a version that conforms to the LM GTE regulations at the 2016 24 Hours of Le Mans, but the plan never worked and didn't appear at the endurance race event.

The 650S achieved its biggest success when it won the 2016 Liqui Moly Bathurst 12 Hour race in Australia at the hands of Álvaro Parente, Shane van Gisbergen and Jonathon Webb. Van Gisbergen set a new outright lap record with a time of 2:01.567 on 7 February 2016.
