= Johnson Matthey Battery Systems =

British manufacturing company

- Industry: Manufacturing
- Headquarters: Milton Keynes, United Kingdom
- Products: Batteries and Battery Systems
- Owner: Cummins Inc.
- Number of employees: 500 (2013)
- Website: www.jmbatterysystems.com

Johnson Matthey Battery Systems, part of the Johnson Matthey group and formerly called Axeon, designs and manufactures advanced lithium-ion battery systems for electric vehicles and processes over 70 million cells per year. Headquartered in Dundee, Scotland and with operations in Poland and sales offices in Coventry, England, Johnson Matthey Battery Systems produces batteries for all types of electric vehicles including urban delivery vehicles and high performance sports cars.

== History ==
In 2006, Axeon, as a software company, began working with MPower, a manufacturer producing batteries for mobile phones and portable products. MPower was working on a battery to be used in electric vehicles and the Battery Management System, the software that monitors the lithium-ion cells, interfaces with the vehicle and ensures safety, was provided by Axeon. In 2007, Axeon merged with Mpower.

In 2008, Axeon acquired Ristma AG, a Swiss holding company whose constituent companies also had several decades of experience in battery design and manufacture. The trading companies, formerly EMB GmbH and SAT AG, design and sell battery packs for the professional power tool market and Robert Bosch GmbH is a key customer. They also manufacture battery packs for a range of mobile applications, including medical and industrial monitoring equipment, and leisure equipment such as electric bicycles and powered golf trolleys. Manufacturing is carried out at a facility in Poland, formerly MAZ Sp.Z.o.o.

In 2009 Axeon was forced into administration by its major lender and 20% shareholder Ironshield Capital Management LLP with no notice and following its assurance of continued support and that Axeon's future was bright. Ironshield appointed Grant Thornton who failed to find a buyer after they "discreetly marketed" the company. Almost immediately Ironshield formed a new vehicle "AG Holdings" which acquired Axeon outright allowing Axeon to continue in business as normal, excepting the shareholders who were wiped out through the move. Following its acquisition AG Holdings reported that Axeon had a very bright future.

In October 2012 Axeon was acquired in total by Johnson Matthey, a British multinational chemicals and precious metals company headquartered in London, United Kingdom, which is listed on the London Stock Exchange and is a constituent of the FTSE 100 Index. Axeon rebranded as Johnson Matthey Battery Systems in August 2013.

In January 2018, Johnson Matthey Battery Systems was acquired by Cummins.

== Automotive ==
=== Plug-in hybrid electric vehicles ===
Johnson Matthey Battery Systems has worked with McLaren Automotive to develop an advanced lithium-ion battery for the McLaren P1, a limited production plug-in hybrid supercar. Power for the vehicle's electric motor is stored in a 324-cell lithium-ion high density battery pack located behind the cabin. The battery pack is liquid-cooled and the Battery Management System incorporates active cell balancing.

=== Range-extended electric hybrid vehicles ===
Jaguar Land Rover displayed the ultra-low carbon XJ_e plug-in hybrid engineering research vehicle at the Goodwood Festival of Speed in June 2012. This was the outcome of a project led by Jaguar Cars to develop a range-extended electric hybrid vehicle, and is powered by an Axeon lithium-ion battery.

In October 2011 Axeon announced that it would also supply two prototype batteries to Intelligent Energy for a UK Technology Strategy Board (TSB)-grant-assisted project to develop a concept for a lightweight, low emissions, range extended electric delivery van. This vehicle was launched in June 2012.

=== Electric vehicles ===
At the 2011 Geneva Motor Show, Rolls-Royce Motor Cars unveiled its new 102EX Phantom Experimental Electric, which is powered by a battery from Axeon. The battery system is believed to be the biggest passenger car battery built in the world, both in terms of capacity and power, with 71kWh overall capacity and 388V DC nominal power. The power pack is expected to deliver a range of up to 200 km with a 0-60 mph acceleration time of under 8 seconds. The batteries can be recharged via a plug in cable or in eight hours by using a wireless induction charging system.

At Indaba 2011, one of Africa's largest tourism events, Land Rover South Africa unveiled the Electric Defender Game Viewer Concept with an Axeon battery pack. The vehicle was built for the Londolozi Private Game Reserve, a major South African game park. The standard 2.4-litre diesel engine from the Defender was replaced by an electric motor and 28.8 kWh battery pack in the engine bay, which enables the vehicle to maintain its original ground clearance and wading height.

== Power tools ==
Johnson Matthey Battery Systems supplies lithium-ion battery technology for cordless power tools, such as cordless hedge trimmers and lawn mowers. Its customers include several major producers of professional power tools, including Robert Bosch GmbH.

== Electric bikes ==
Johnson Matthey Battery Systems supplies rechargeable lithium-ion batteries to several electric bike projects for both major component manufacturers and bike OEMs, manufacturing e-bike batteries using various cells from a range of cell manufacturers.

== Mobile power ==
Johnson Matthey Battery Systems produces mobile batteries that mean devices are able to run without a connection to mains electricity. Applications include mobile phones, cordless phones, pagers; medical devices such as diagnostic equipment and infusion pumps; mobility aids such as bath lifts and electric wheelchairs; industrial equipment such as gas meters and data loggers; leisure products such as electric bicycles and powered golf trolleys and other applications such as portable credit card readers, forklift trucks, horse massage blankets and olive tree shakers.

== Technology ==
=== Cells ===
Johnson Matthey Battery Systems is independent of cell suppliers, allowing the company to deploy a range of cell chemistry for its automotive products. Currently, it works mainly with Lithium Iron Phosphate and Lithium NCM (Nickel Cobalt Manganese) chemistries. It is also working on a project to develop a high energy density Transition metal oxide/Silicon alloy battery for PHEV (Plug-in Hybrid Electric Vehicle) applications.

=== Battery management systems ===
The battery management system (BMS) is an essential component within a multiple cell battery pack. It monitors the state of a battery, measuring and controlling key operational parameters, and thus ensuring safety. Johnson Matthey Battery Systems’ BMS incorporates proprietary battery management electronics, and its four main objectives are to protect the cells and the battery from damage, prolong the life of the battery, maintain the battery in a state where it can meet the requirements of the application and to interface with the host application.

=== Batteries ===
Johnson Matthey Battery Systems designs and manufactures batteries for a wide range of applications, from low-power, low-capacity batteries for industrial, leisure and medical uses, to high-power, high-capacity batteries for use in electric vehicles and hybrid electric vehicles. Johnson Matthey Battery Systems produces a range of batteries from as little as 1 or 2 watts up to 180 kWhr, and from 2.4 Volts to 614 Volts. Johnson Matthey Battery Systems' battery packs are subjected to a testing regime that meets industry standards. This covers environmental tests, electromagnetic testing, bump and vibration testing.

=== Battery chargers ===
Johnson Matthey Battery Systems can supply both off-board and on-board battery chargers, which include an enclosure, the mains input wiring and safety circuits, as well as the umbilical cabling, and can also arrange them to be CE mark approved.

== See also ==
- Electric vehicle
- Battery electric vehicle
- Plug-in hybrid electric vehicle
- Electric vehicle battery
- Electric Car Corporation
- Electric bikes
