= McLaren M838T engine =

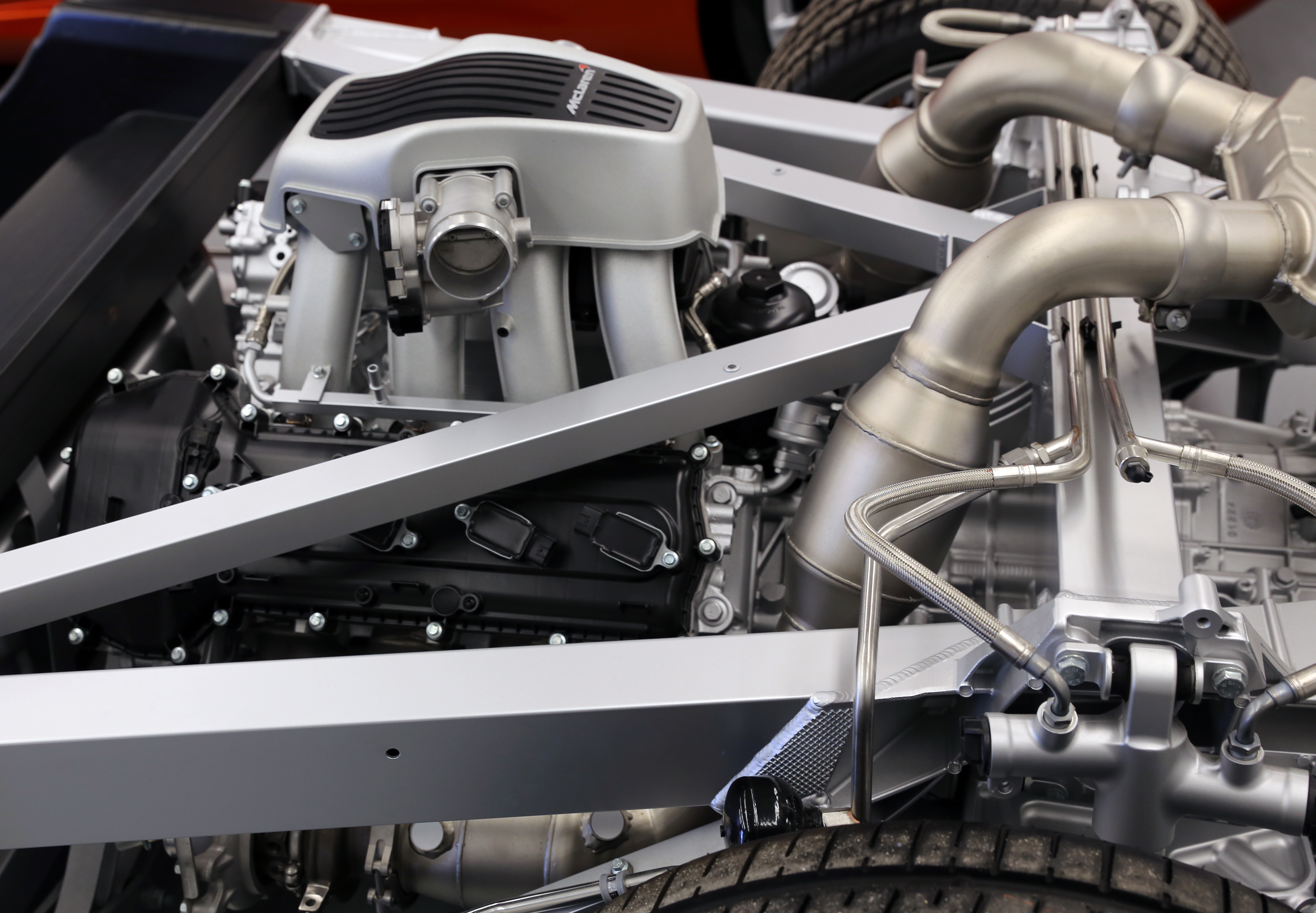
- The M838T engine, in a McLaren 12C rolling chassis

Overview
- Manufacturer: McLaren & Ricardo
- Production: 2011-2021

Layout
- Configuration: 90° flat-plane V8
- Displacement: 3,799 cc (232 cu in)
- Cylinder bore: 93 mm (3.66 in)
- Piston stroke: 69.9 mm (2.75 in)
- Valvetrain: DOHC 4 valves x cyl.

RPM range
- Max. engine speed: 8500

Combustion
- Turbocharger: MHI Twin-turbo with intercooler
- Fuel system: Fuel injection
- Fuel type: Unleaded petrol + Ethanol (both blends may vary) by Esso/ExxonMobil Synergy (2011-2016) later BP Ultimate (2017-2020) later Gulf Pro/Endurance Fuels (2021)
- Cooling system: Water-cooled

Output
- Power output: 500–800 PS (493–789 bhp; 368–588 kW)
- Torque output: 540–720 N⋅m (398–531 lb⋅ft)

Dimensions
- Dry weight: 199 kg (439 lb)

Chronology
- Successor: McLaren M840T

The McLaren M838T engine is a 3.8-litre (3,798.6 cc) 90-degree twin-turbocharged flat-plane V8, designed and developed in collaboration with Ricardo.

== Development ==
McLaren bought the rights to the Tom Walkinshaw Racing developed engine, itself based on the Nissan VRH engine architecture, which was designed for the IRL Indycar championship but never raced. However, other than the 93 mm (3.66 in) bore, little of that engine remains in the M838T. In only 18 months, Ricardo went from a modified Nissan engine design to a running prototype.

The Ricardo-developed engine redlines at 8500 rpm, but 80% of the engine's torque is available as low as 2000 rpm. McLaren claims that the engine has the highest horsepower to CO_{2} emission ratio of any current production engine.

The engine is built at Ricardo's engine assembly facility in Shoreham-by-Sea, West Sussex. The turbochargers are supplied by Mitsubishi Heavy Industries (MHI), and are different units from those used in Mitsubishi Lancer Evolutions.

== Applications ==
The engine was designed and built for the McLaren MP4-12C, where it produces 600 PS (592 bhp; 441 kW) at 7000 rpm and 600 N⋅m (443 lb⋅ft) at 3000 rpm of torque. In 2012, McLaren released an update increasing power to 625 PS (616 bhp; 460 kW) at 7500 rpm. For the GT3 racecar, the engine produces less power at only 500 PS (493 bhp; 368 kW).

The engine has a bore and stroke of 93 mm × 69.9 mm (3.66 in × 2.75 in) and a bore spacing of 108 mm (4.25 in).

McLaren and Ricardo redeveloped the M838T engine for use in the McLaren P1. The engine has been upgraded to optimise cooling and durability under higher loads. The engine block has also been modified to incorporate an integrated electric motor as part of a hybrid drive train. The petrol engine produces 727 bhp (542 kW) at 7,200 rpm with an additional 176 bhp (131 kW) from the electric motor. At 4,000 rpm the engine is said to produce 720 N⋅m (531 lb⋅ft) of torque while the electric motor can produce a maximum of 260 N⋅m (192 lb⋅ft) from 0 rpm upwards.

Models	Years	Codename	Power	Torque
MP4-12C	2011–2012	M838T	600 PS (441 kW; 592 bhp) at 7000 rpm	600 N⋅m (443 lb⋅ft) at 3000 rpm
MP4-12C	2013–2014	M838T	625 PS (460 kW; 616 bhp) at 7500 rpm	600 N⋅m (443 lb⋅ft) at 3000 rpm
MP4-12C GT3	2011–2015	M838T	500 PS (368 kW; 493 bhp)	-
650S	2014–2017	M838T	650 PS (478 kW; 641 bhp) at 7250 rpm	680 N⋅m (502 lb⋅ft) at 6000 rpm
675LT	2015–2017	M838T	675 PS (496 kW; 666 bhp) at 7100 rpm	700 N⋅m (516 lb⋅ft) at 5500 rpm
MSO 688 HS	2016–2017	M838T	688 PS (506 kW; 679 bhp)	700 N⋅m (516 lb⋅ft) at 5500 rpm
P1	2013–2015	M838TQ	737 PS (542 kW; 727 bhp) at 7200 rpm Electric: 179 PS (132 kW; 177 bhp); Total: 916 PS (674 kW; 903 bhp)	720 N⋅m (531 lb⋅ft); Electric: 260 N⋅m (192 lb⋅ft); Total: 980 N⋅m (723 lb⋅ft)
P1 GTR/LM	2015–2017	M838TQ	800 PS (588 kW; 789 bhp) at 7250 rpm Electric: 200 PS (147 kW; 197 bhp); Total: 1,000 PS (740 kW; 990 bhp)	Total: 1,050 N⋅m (774 lb⋅ft)
540C	2016–2021	M838TE	540 PS (397 kW; 533 bhp) at 7500 rpm	540 N⋅m (398 lb⋅ft) at 3500–6500 rpm
570S	2016–2021	M838TE	570 PS (419 kW; 562 bhp) at 7400 rpm	600 N⋅m (443 lb⋅ft) at 5000–6500 rpm
600LT	2018–2021	M838TE	600 PS (441 kW; 592 bhp) at 7500 rpm	620 N⋅m (457 lb⋅ft) at 5500–6500 rpm
620R	2020–2021	M838TE	620 PS (456 kW; 612 bhp) at 7500 rpm	620 N⋅m (457 lb⋅ft) at 5500 rpm
