= McLaren P1 =

British sports car designed and manufactured by McLaren Automotive

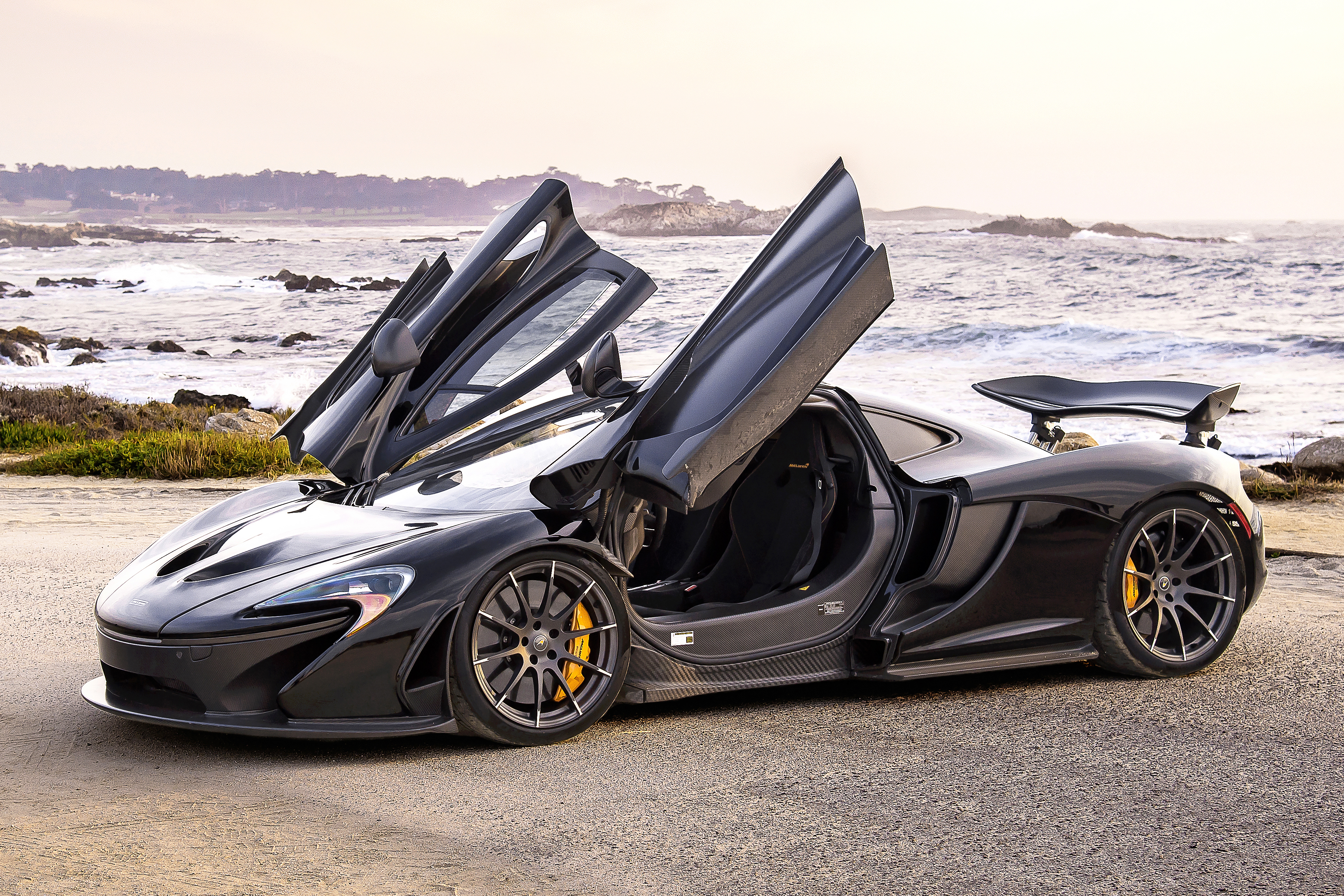
- A P1 pictured during the 2015 Monterey Car Week

Overview
- Manufacturer: McLaren Automotive
- Production: October 2013 – December 2015
- Assembly: United Kingdom: Woking, Surrey, England
- Designer: Frank Stephenson; Paul Howse; Rob Melville; Simon Lacey

Body and chassis
- Class: Sports car (S)
- Body style: 2-door coupé
- Layout: Rear mid-engine, rear-wheel-drive
- Platform: Carbon fibre monocoque
- Doors: Butterfly doors

Powertrain
- Engine: 3,799 cc (231.8 cu in) twin-turbocharged M838TQ V8
- Electric motor: 1 McLaren E-Motor
- Power output: 916 PS (674 kW; 903 hp) (combined), 179 PS (132 kW; 177 hp) (electric only)
- Transmission: 7-speed Graziano dual-clutch
- Hybrid drivetrain: PHEV
- Battery: 4.7 kWh (16.9 MJ), 535V lithium-ion battery
- Range: 480 km (300 mi) (EPA)
- Electric range: 11 km (6.8 miles) (combined NEDC), 31 km (19 mi) (EPA)

Dimensions
- Wheelbase: 2,670 mm (105.1 in)
- Length: 4,588 mm (180.6 in)
- Width: 1,946 mm (76.6 in)
- Height: 1,188 mm (46.8 in)
- Kerb weight: 1,490 kg (3,280 lb)

Chronology
- Predecessor: McLaren F1
- Successor: McLaren W1

The McLaren P1 (codenamed P12) is a flagship sports car produced by British marque McLaren Automotive. Styled by American car designer Frank Stephenson, it is the second installment in McLaren's Ultimate Series after the McLaren F1. Considered to be the spiritual successor to the F1, the P1 was one of the first high performance sports cars to be introduced incorporating hybrid technology; the Porsche 918 Spyder having begun taking orders prior to the P1 and the LaFerrari introduced alongside it. First shown as a concept on the 20th anniversary of the F1 at the 2012 Paris Motor Show, the P1 made its debut at the 2013 Geneva International Motor Show.

In similar fashion to the F1, the P1 is mid-engined, rear wheel drive, and has a carbon fibre monocoque. Stephenson drew inspiration for parts of the car from a sailfish he saw when on holiday in Miami. In all, 375 units were produced, with several special editions such as the non-road legal P1 GTR and P1 LM among others having smaller production runs. Several pre-production prototypes utilised by McLaren for testing were later refurbished, modified and sold to customers.

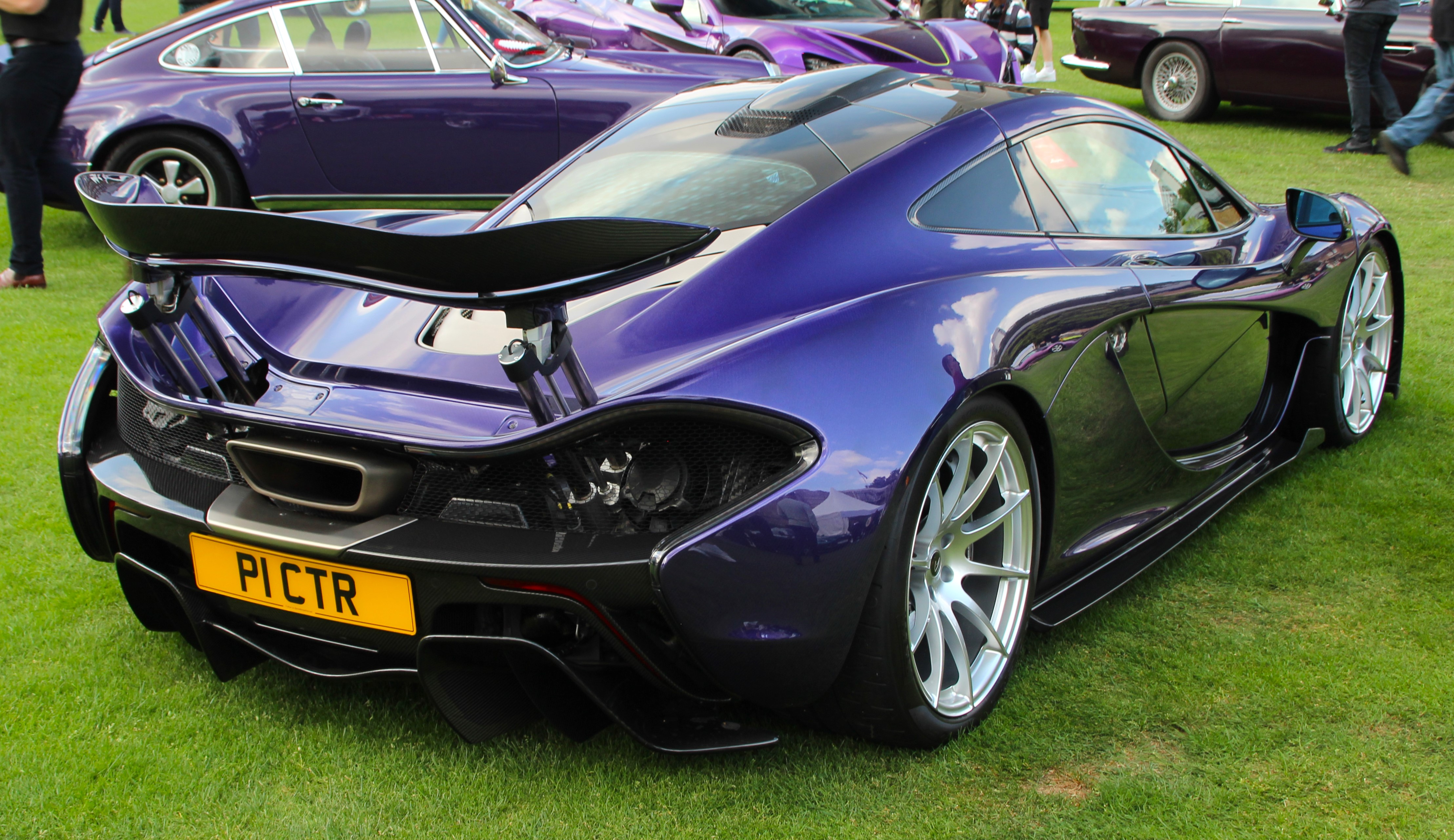
2013 McLaren P1 MSO rear view

== Background ==
Following the conclusion of McLaren F1 production in 1998, McLaren Automotive (then McLaren Cars) became dormant until 2010. The McLaren 12C was McLaren's first production car following the F1, introduced in 2011. With the 12C in production, McLaren announced in a press release in 2011 that a new factory (the McLaren Production Centre) had opened to ramp up production. Mentioned in the same press release were plans for several "game-changing high performance cars". British automotive magazine Autocar reported earlier in the year that a new flagship model, internally designated the "Mega Mac", was under development, with production set to be limited to 500 units. Other specifications included a 5 L (305.1 cu in) litre V8 that was set to produce 799 hp (810 PS; 596 kW), and performance intended to rival that of the Bugatti Veyron.

The first teaser was shown to the public in September 2012. Alongside a vague visual depiction of the car, British automotive magazine car reported that American designer Frank Stephenson was to be in charge of the exterior design of the P1, along with powertrain details. The engine was expected to be an upgraded version of the M838T engine found in the McLaren MP4-12C mated to a KERS system. The first actual photos of the P1 concept were revealed days later ahead of its public debut.

A pre-production conceptual version of the P1 was shown at the 2012 Paris Motor Show, with further details of the performance of the P1. Aerodynamic performance was quoted at 600 kg (1,323 lb) of downforce "well below maximum speed", a drag coefficient of Cd=0.34, and the revelation of the active aero components within the P1. Details about the P1's powertrain were scant; American automotive magazine MotorTrend reported that according to McLaren insiders, the P1 was to have a plug-in hybrid powertrain. This was in line with earlier reports by British magazine car. The P1's performance relative to the Veyron was also clarified, with McLaren having "no interest in out-Veyroning the Veyron", instead the P1's performance was to be more track-oriented. McLaren Automotive Managing Director Antony Sheriff echoed the sentiment at the P1's Paris debut, saying that the P1's aim "is not necessarily to be the fastest in absolute top speed but to be the quickest and most rewarding series production road car on a circuit". The production version of the P1 was unveiled at the 2013 Geneva Motor Show.

== Specifications ==
The P1 features a 3.8 L; 231.8 cu in (3,799 cc) twin-turbocharged V8 engine. The twin turbos boost the petrol engine at 1.4 bar (20.3 psi) to deliver 542 kW (737 PS; 727 hp) at 7,500 rpm and 531 lb⋅ft (720 N⋅m) of torque at 4,000 rpm, combined with an in-house-developed electric motor producing 132 kW (179 PS; 177 hp) and 192 lb⋅ft (260 N⋅m) of torque. The motor is the McLaren M838TQ

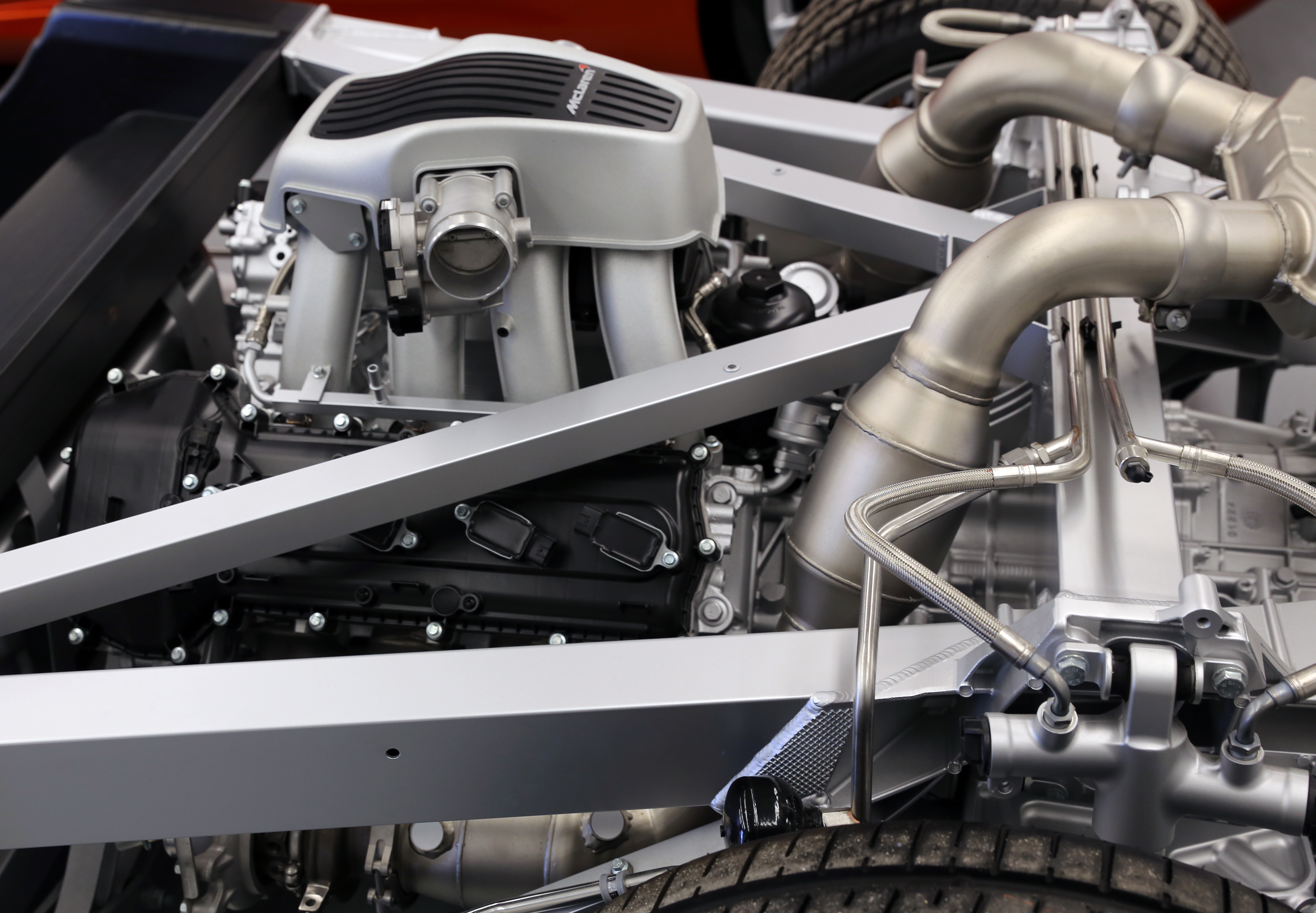
The basis of the M838TQ, the M838T in the MP4-12C, the predecessor of P1.

The electric motor and the petrol engine in the P1, produce a combined power output of 674 kW (916 PS; 903 hp) and 900 N⋅m (664 lb⋅ft) of torque. The electric motor can be deployed manually by the driver or left in automatic mode, whereby the car's ECUs 'torque fill' the gaps in the petrol engine's output, which is considered turbo lag. This gives the powertrain an effective powerband of almost 7,000 rpm. The car has rear mid-engine, rear-wheel-drive layout and is equipped with a 7-speed dual-clutch transmission developed by Graziano Trasmissioni.

Power for the electric motor is stored in a 324-cell lithium-ion high-density battery pack located behind the cabin, developed by Johnson Matthey Battery Systems. The battery can be charged by the engine or through a plug-in equipment and can be fully charged in two hours. The car can be operated using either the petrol engine, the electric motor or with a combination of the two. The P1 has an all-electric range of at least 10 km (6.2 mi) on the combined European drive cycle. Under the EPA cycle, the range in EV mode is 19 mi (31 km). During EV mode the P1 has a petrol consumption of 4.8g/100 mile, and as a result, EPA's all-electric range is rated as zero. The total range is 330 mi (531 km). The P1 combined fuel economy in EV mode was rated by the EPA at 18 MPGe (13 L petrol equivalent/100 km; 22 mpg-imp petrol equivalent), with an energy consumption of 25 kW-hrs/100 mi and petrol consumption of 4.8 gal_{-US}/100 mi. The combined fuel economy when running only with petrol is 17 mpg_{‑US} (14 L/100 km; 20 mpg_{‑imp}), 16 mpg_{‑US} (15 L/100 km; 19 mpg_{‑imp}) for city driving, and 20 mpg_{‑US} (12 L/100 km; 24 mpg_{‑imp}) in highway.

The P1 has Formula 1 derived features such as the Instant Power Assist System (IPAS), which gives an instant boost in acceleration via the electric motor, a Drag Reduction System (DRS) which operates the car's rear wing, thereby increasing straight line speed, and a KERS. Both of these features (IPAS, DRS) are operated via two buttons on the steering wheel. It also generates a downforce of 600 kg at 257 km/h (160 mph) and it boasts of a drag coefficient of only Cd=0.34.

According to McLaren the P1 accelerates from 0–100 km/h (0–62 mph) in 2.8 seconds, 0–200 km/h (0–124 mph) in 6.8 seconds, and 0–300 km/h (0–186 mph) in 16.5 seconds, making it a full 5.5 seconds faster than the F1, and a standing quarter mile is claimed in 9.8 seconds at 245 km/h (152 mph). Autocar tested 0–60 mph (0–97 km/h) mph in 2.8 seconds, 0–120 mph (0–193 km/h) mph in 6.9 seconds, the standing quarter mile in 10.2 seconds at 147.5 mph (237 km/h), and the standing kilometre in 18.2 seconds at 178.5 mph (287 km/h). In electric only mode 0-60 mph in 10 seconds. The P1 is electronically limited to a top speed of 350 km/h (217 mph). The P1 has a dry weight of 1,395 kg (3,075 lb), giving it a power-to-weight ratio of 656 PS/tonne. It has a kerb weight of 1,547 kg (3,411 lb) which translates to 601 PS/ tonne. The P1 also features bespoke Pirelli P-Zero Corsa tyres and specially developed carbon-ceramic rotor, caliper and brake pads from Akebono. According to McLaren it takes 6.2 seconds to brake from 300 km/h (186 mph) to standstill, during which the car will cover 246 metres. From 60 mph (97 km/h), it will cover 30.2 metres.

== Production ==
In August 2013 McLaren announced that the production allocation destined to the Americas, Asia-Pacific and the Middle East was sold out. The cars destined for Europe were sold out by mid November 2013. The United States accounted for 34% of the limited production run, and Europe for 26%.

After some delays, production began in October 2013. Hand-assembled by a team of 61 engineers, at a production rate of one car per day McLaren production was planned for fifty cars by the end of 2013. The first delivery to a retail customer took place at the company's headquarters in Woking, England, in October 2013, with 12 units manufactured by mid November 2013. The first P1 delivery in the U.S. occurred in May 2014. The production run ended in December 2015.

=== Recalls ===
In January 2016, the NHTSA issued a recall for 122 2014–2015 model year P1 cars manufactured between 1 March 2013 and 31 October 2015 due to a faulty secondary bonnet latch. The concern was that if the primary latch were to snap, the secondary latch would be unable to catch the bonnet, leading to it opening whilst driving. All replacements were done at no cost to the owner.

== Variants ==
=== P1 GTR (2015–2016) ===
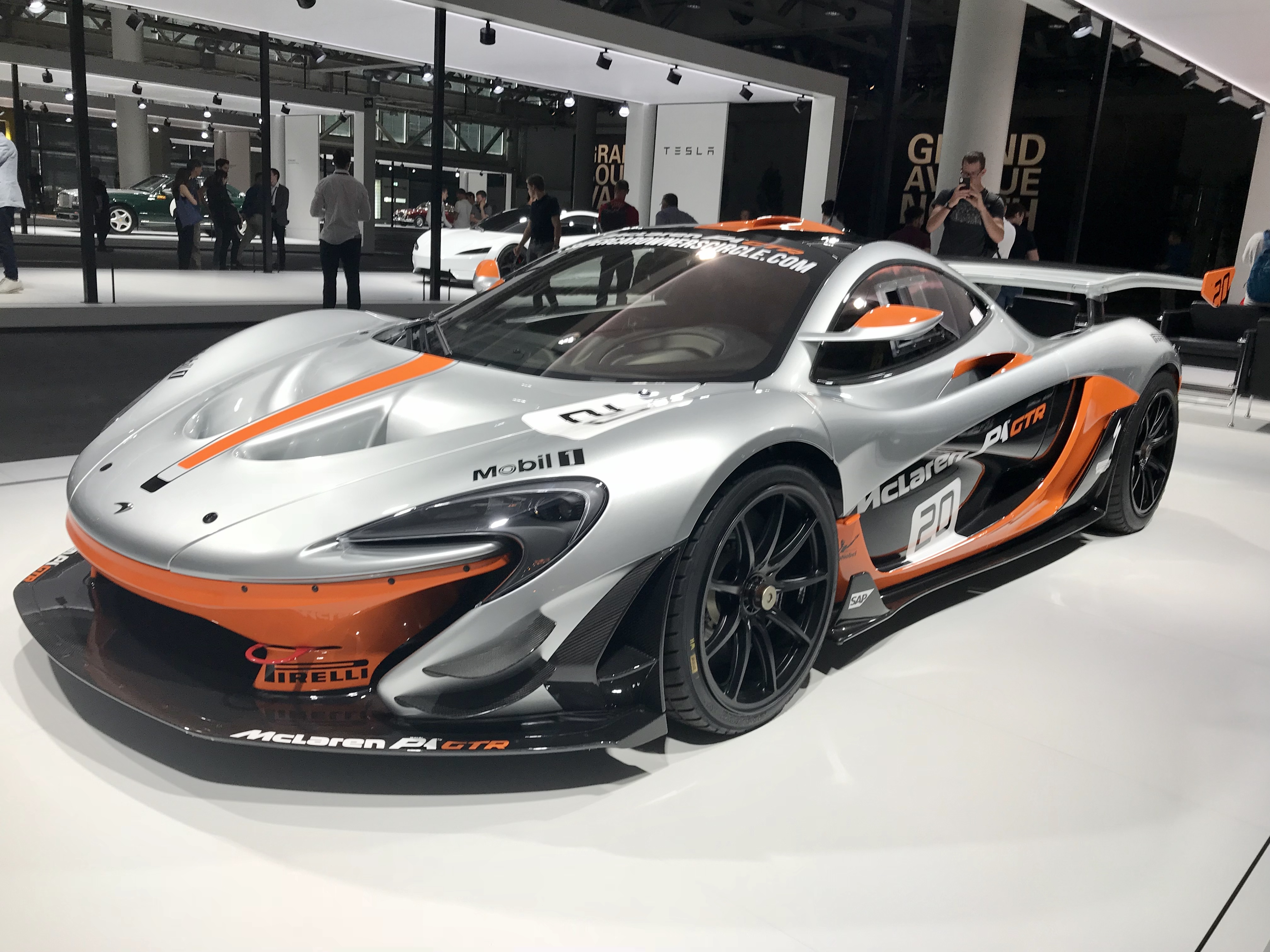
P1 GTR exterior

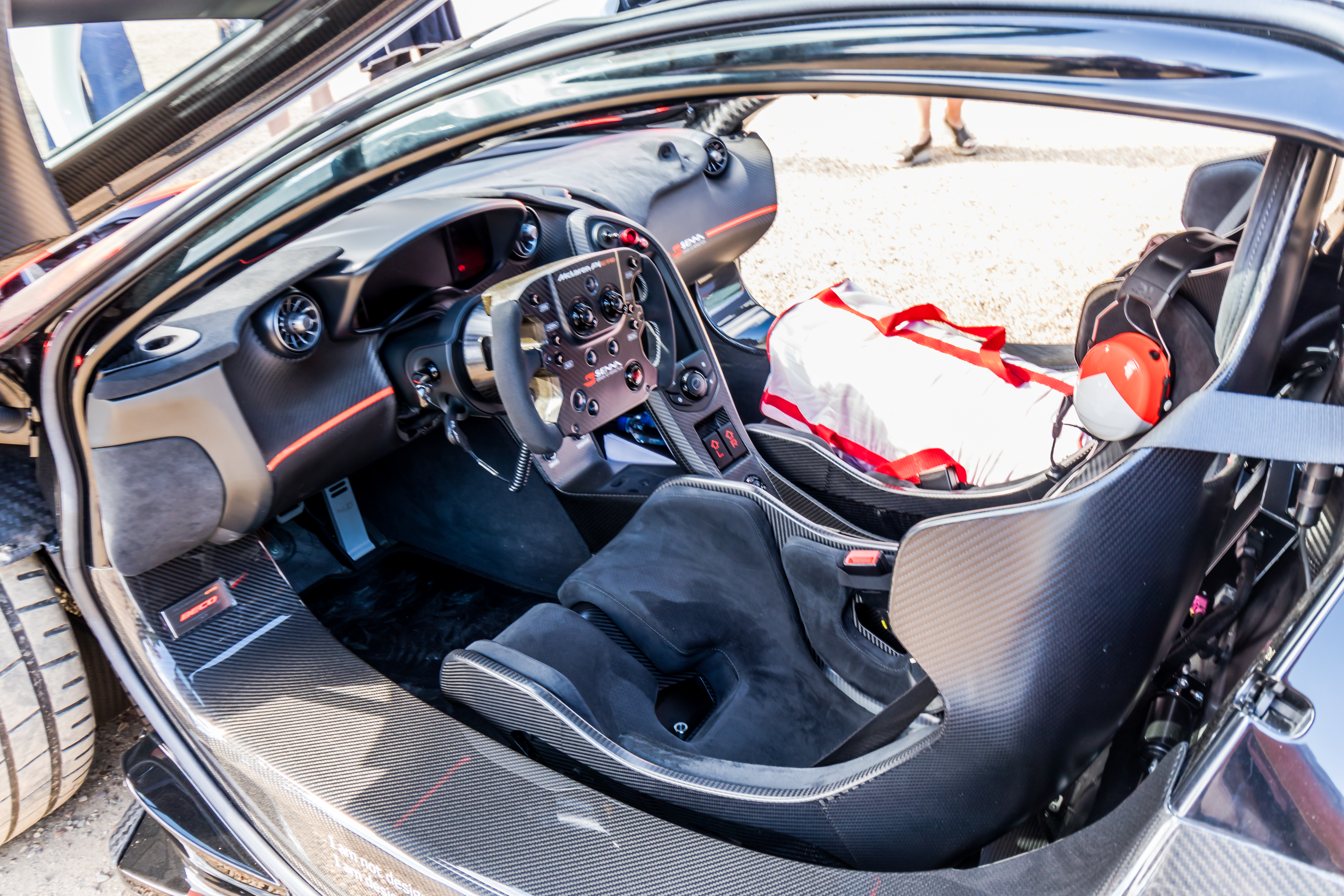
P1 GTR interior

Celebrating 20 years since their victory in the 1995 24 Hours of Le Mans, McLaren announced that they would resurrect the GTR name by launching a track-only version of the P1, the P1 GTR.

The P1 GTR was initially only available to P1 owners. The concept car made its debut at the 2014 Pebble Beach Concours d'Elegance in August 2014. The P1 GTR production model was officially unveiled at the 2015 Geneva Motor Show. This price includes a worldwide owners track day series; later cars were offered for less money, for those P1 owners who had no interest in the track series but still wanted to purchase the GTR variant. In total 58 cars were made.

The P1 GTR went into production in 2015, after all the 375 standard P1s had been built, as a homage to its race-winning ancestor, the McLaren F1 GTR and were built, maintained and run by McLaren Special Operations.

The P1 GTR's hybrid engine is rated at 1,000 PS (735 kW; 986 hp), representing an 84 PS (62 kW; 83 hp) increase over the standard production P1, although McLaren did not disclose whether the power increase was from electrical boost or tuning the twin-turbocharged 3.8-litre V8. Performance figures remain unconfirmed. The weight of the P1 GTR was reduced by 50 kg (110 lb), achieving a power-to-weight ratio of 697 PS (513 kW; 687 hp) per 1 tonne (1.1 tons). This equates to a weight-to-power ratio of 1.44 kg (3.17 lb) per horsepower. The car also featured slick tyres, and had greater levels of performance, grip, aerodynamics and downforce in comparison to the road car. Featuring a new fixed ride height on race-prepared suspension, a fixed rear wing capable of using DRS, and a new exclusively designed exhaust made of titanium and Inconel. Due to its fixed rear wing, the GTR generates 10% more downforce than the road legal P1. The P1 GTR has a kerb weight of 1,440 kg (3,175 lb) which includes the weight of the batteries.

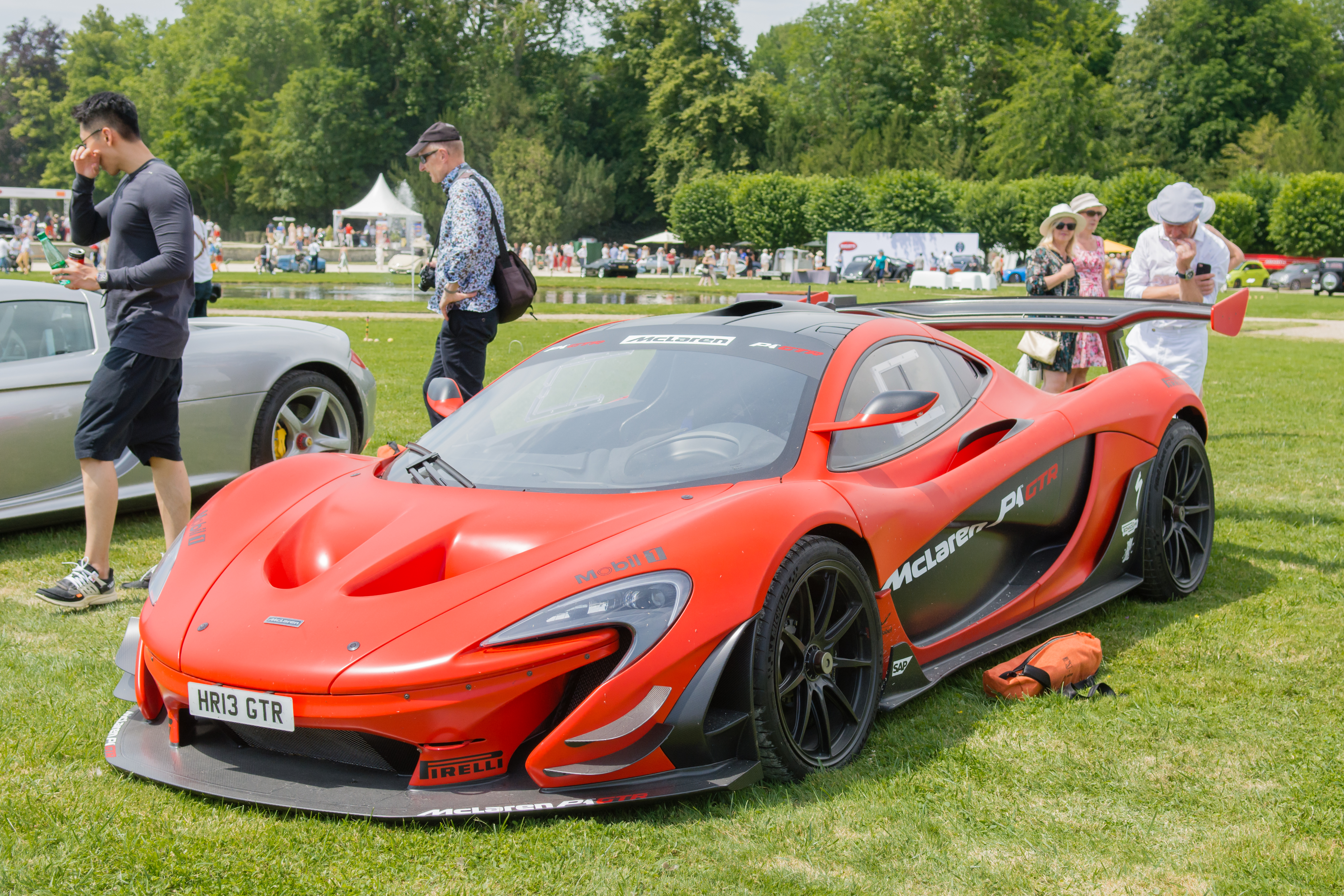
Road legal P1 GTR converted by Lanzante

The P1 GTR can accelerate from 0–97 km/h (60 mph) in under 2.8 seconds, and will go on to reach a limited top speed of 349 km/h (217 mph). Additionally, the P1 GTR will brake from 97 km/h (60 mph) to 0 in 85 ft (26 m), and can corner at 1.54 G long with pulling a lateral acceleration of 2.5 g on the skidpad.

In late 2015, historic racing team and McLaren F1 specialists Lanzante Motorsport started undergoing road conversions of P1 GTRs for owners who wanted to drive their cars on the road. Thus far, 27 P1 GTRs have been converted for road use by Lanzante. The road legal version of the P1 GTR has a claimed top speed of 362 km/h (225 mph) and a 0–97 km/h (0–60 mph) time of 2.4 seconds.

To celebrate 40 years since James Hunt won the Formula 1 Driver’s Championship, McLaren designed a livery for the P1 GTR that was inspired by Hunt’s race helmet, with a black base color combined with red, yellow and blue stripes based on his Wellington College colors. The car was showcased at the 2016 Goodwood Festival of Speed and driven by Bruno Senna, the official McLaren P1 GTR Driver Program Mentor.

==== P1 GTR-18 (2018) ====
In April 2020, Lanzante Motorsport announced that it would do six more road legal conversions of the P1 GTR. This conversion uses the same Longtail bodywork found on the one-off P1 GT as well as a modified rear wing, a larger front splitter, and louvers for an increase in downforce. P1 GTR-18 chassis #1 (GTR chassis #11) is painted in the ‘Gulf Team Davidoff’ no. 028R livery with its wheels finished in no. 028R’s trademark orange shade.

=== P1 by MSO (2016) ===
It is a limited version of P1 with hand-laid carbon fibre body in Lio Blue tinted lacquer, gloss black wheels, retrim of the interior with carbon black Alcantara and contrasting blue stitching, a 24-carat gold exhaust heatshield.

The vehicle was unveiled in the 2016 Geneva Motor Show.

=== P1 LM (2016–2017) ===
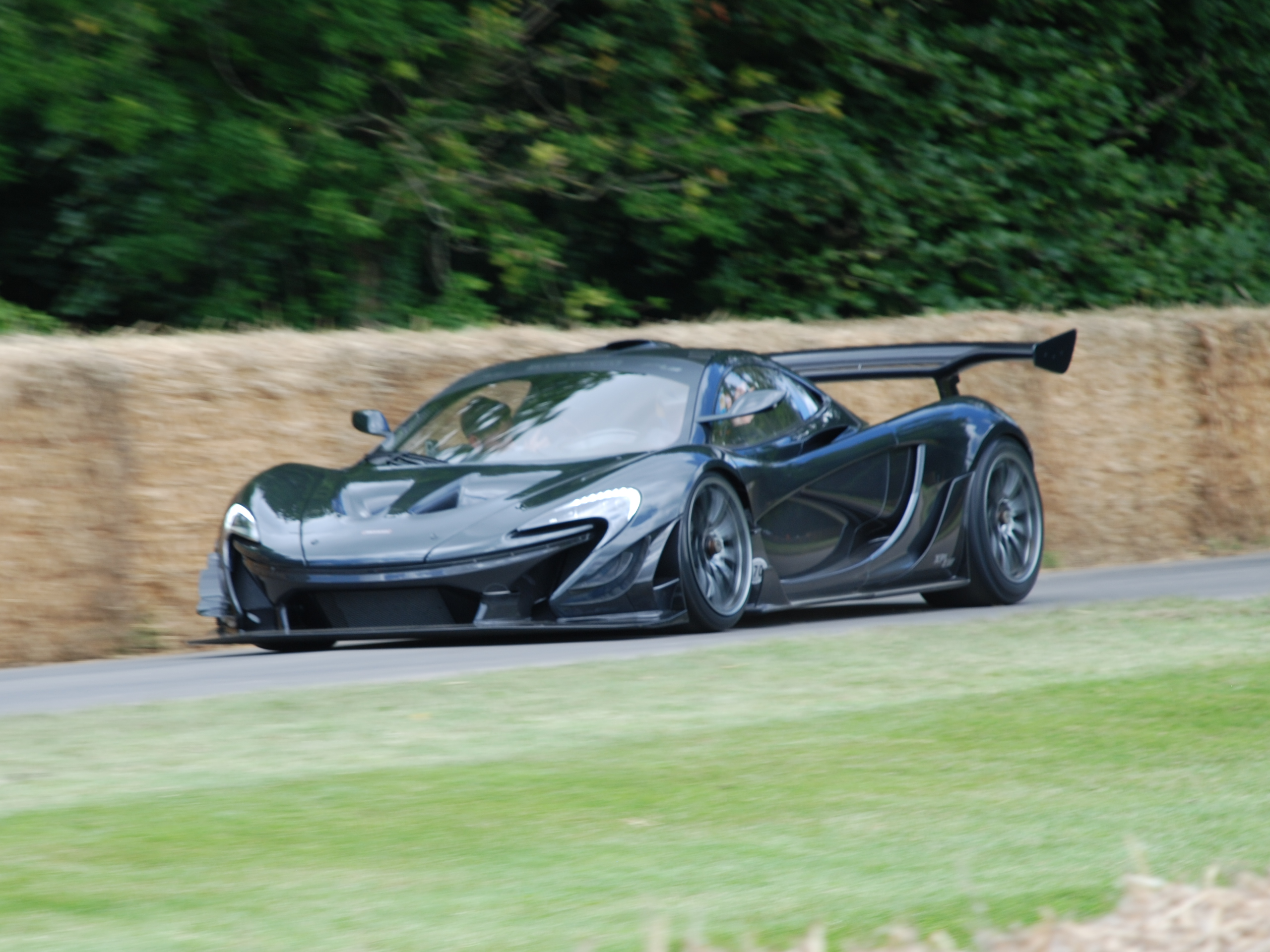
The prototype P1 LM (XP1 LM) at the 2016 Goodwood Festival of Speed

With the production run of the P1 GTR complete, and prompted by their efforts in converting track-only P1 GTRs to road-legal specification, Lanzante Motorsport commissioned McLaren Special Operations' Bespoke division to build a further total of 6 new P1 GTRs for them to develop into road-legal P1 LM variants. Of this production run, five P1 LMs were sold and the sixth, the prototype P1 LM codenamed 'XP1 LM', was retained and is now being used for development and testing of future models. In order to convert the cars into the P1 LM specification, Lanzante Motorsport made changes to the drivetrain hardware (to increase power output), employed a modified rear wing and larger front splitter along with dive planes (to improve downforce), removed the air-jack system and installed Inconel catalytic converter pipes and exhaust headers, lightweight fabricated charge coolers, Lexan windows, lighter seats (similar to those used in the F1 GTR) and a titanium exhaust system, bolts and fixings (to save weight). The result is a weight reduction of 60 kg (132 lb) as compared to the P1 GTR as well as a 40 per cent increase in downforce. The P1 LM also features a larger twin-turbocharged V8 engine than the P1 and P1 GTR at 3,994 cc (4.0 L) with an 8,500 rpm red line.

The P1 LM has a total power output of 1,000 PS (735 kW; 986 hp) and 1,050 N⋅m (774 lb⋅ft) of torque, with 800 PS (588 kW; 789 hp) being delivered at 7,250 rpm and an additional 200 PS (147 kW; 197 hp) from its electric motor. The top speed is limited to 345 km/h (214 mph). The tyre specifications are 275/30/19 for the front tyres and 335/30/20 for the rear tyres.

At the 2016 Goodwood Festival of Speed, the prototype P1 LM, 'XP1 LM', set the fastest ever time for a road car up the Goodwood hillclimb, with a time of 47.07 seconds, driven by Kenny Bräck.

On 27 April 2017, the prototype P1 LM, XP1 LM, continued its success on track, beating the road car lap record time at the Nürburgring, with a time of 6:43.22 using road legal Pirelli P Zero Trofeo R tyres but without a front number plate required for a car to be road legal. This lap time was once again set by Kenny Bräck, and announced on 26 May 2017.

=== P1 Spider (2022) ===
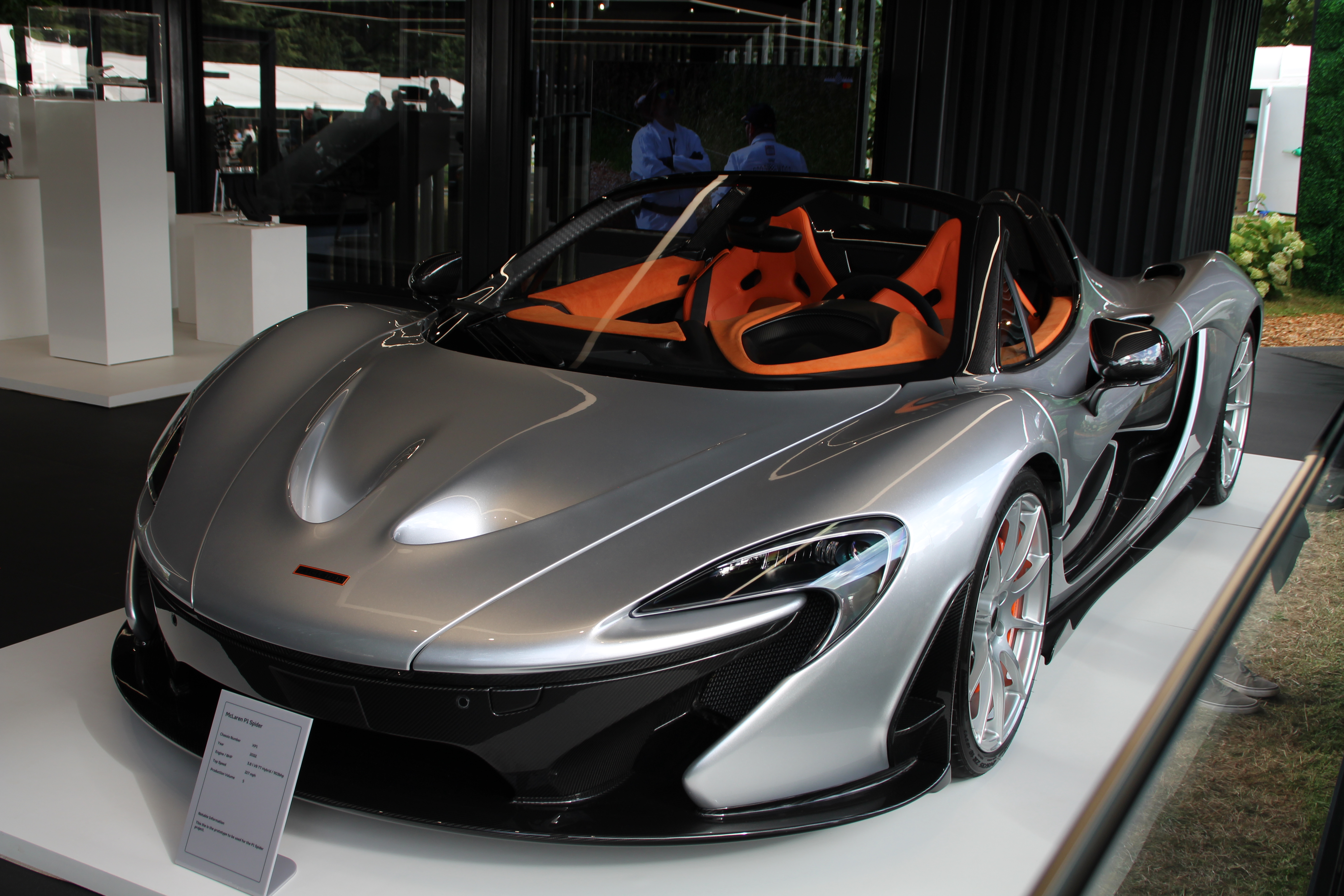
McLaren P1 Spider

In June 2022, at the Goodwood Festival of Speed, Lanzante unveiled the P1 Spider. The company is offered 5 conversions to the open-top P1 for €2.4m.

=== P1 GT (2018) ===
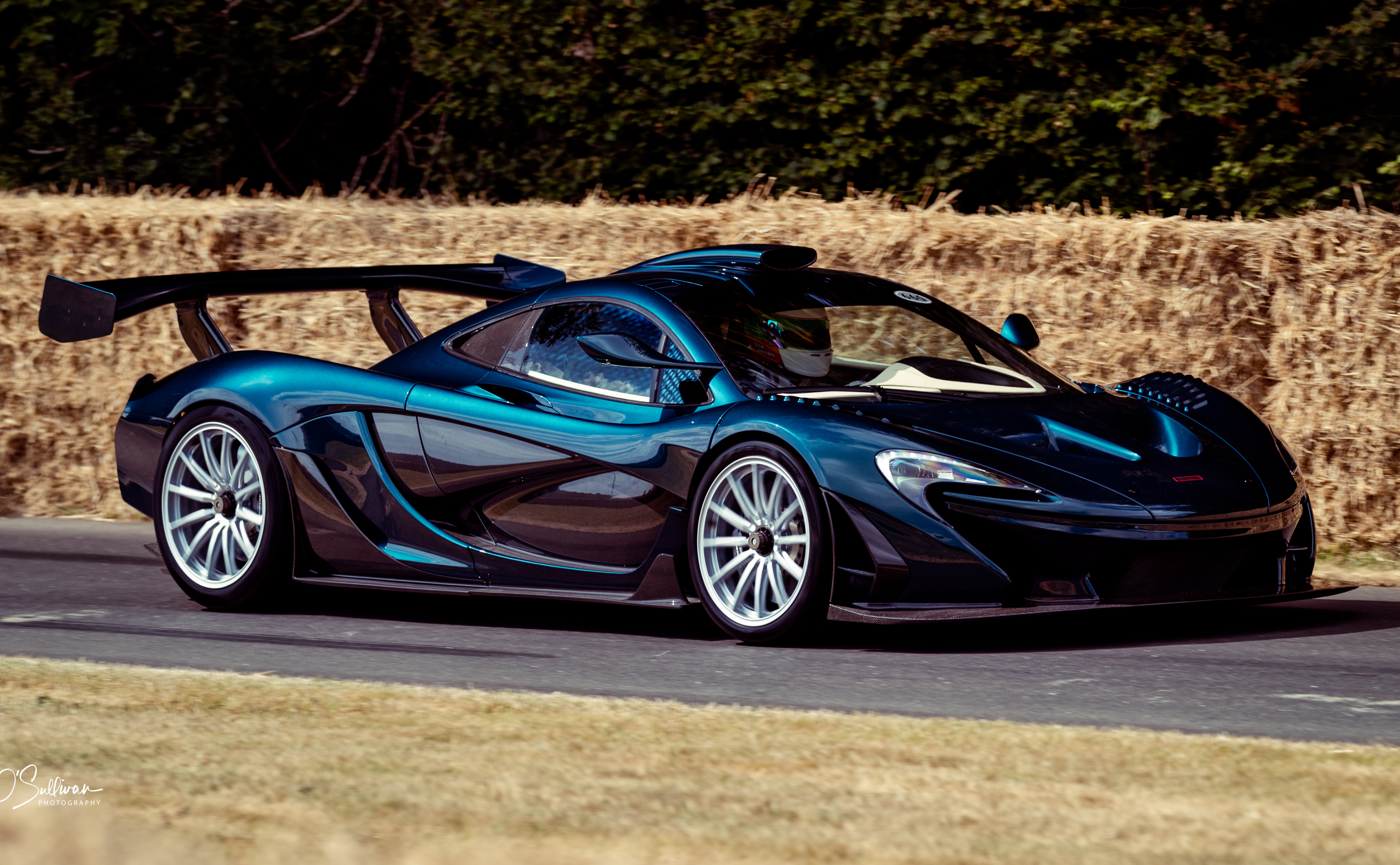
McLaren P1 GT at the 2018 Goodwood Festival of Speed

At the 2018 Goodwood Festival of Speed, Lanzante Motorsport, who had previously modified P1 GTRs to road legal specifications and developed the P1 LM, introduced a new special based on the P1 GTR. The new car, called the P1 GT, was commissioned by two different McLaren VIP customers; one from the United Arab Emirates and one from Japan. Only two were built. The P1 GT is inspired by the McLaren F1 GT homologation special from the 1990s, including more aggressive bodywork than the standard car. Exterior modifications include a longer rear section, a larger rear wing, a longer front splitter, vented front fenders, removal of front canards, quad exhaust system in place of the original dual outlet design and a modified rear diffuser. The interior features fixed sports seats and Alcantara upholstery in tan and green colour along with a racing steering wheel and carbon fibre bits while the exterior features Silverstone green bodywork paying homage to the original homologation special. Powertrain modifications and performance figures remain unknown but are likely to have been increased as compared to the standard car owing to the extensive modifications.

=== P1 GTR by McLaren Special Operations (2018) ===
Also called 'Beco', it is a bespoke version of P1 GTR commemorating 30th anniversary of Ayrton Senna securing his first Formula 1 World Championship. It includes a tailwing inspired by the McLaren-Honda MP4/4 race car, Marlboro liveries.

== Legacy ==
McLaren announced the P1 had completed a sub-seven minute lap of the Nürburgring, which equates to an average speed in excess of 179 km/h (111 mph), but did not publish the exact time. However, the P1 LM, which wasn't road legal during the run, beat the road car's record time at the Nordschleife with a time of 6:43.22.

== Marketing ==
A number of scale models of the P1 have been offered by various companies, including the Mattel Hot Wheels 1:64 die-cast P1 model car in Volcano Orange and Supernova Silver body, Lego Speed Champions series Volcano Yellow McLaren P1 model kit, Scalextric Volcano Yellow and Volcano Orange P1 slot car, Maisto radio-controlled 1:14 scale McLaren P1, Minichamps and Tecnomodel 1:43 P1 model car, and Amalgam Fine Model Cars 1:8 scale McLaren P1.

As part of McLaren Automotive's development of a pure electric vehicle for its Ultimate Series, a miniature version of electric ride on McLaren P1 in Volcano Yellow body colour went on sale at the end of October 2016 at selected McLaren Automotive retailers, followed by recognised global toy retailers.

== See also ==
- List of production cars by power output
- Plug-in electric vehicle
- Plug-in electric vehicles in the United Kingdom
- Government incentives for plug-in electric vehicles
- List of modern production plug-in electric vehicles
