= Graziano Trasmissioni =

Italian car parts manufacturer

Dana Graziano (former Graziano Trasmissioni) is an Italian company based in Turin manufacturing gearboxes, drivelines and their mechatronics components. It makes the "Pre-Cog" seven-speed Seamless-Shift gearbox (SSG) dual-clutch transmission used in the McLaren 12C.

Dana Graziano is the world's largest supplier of precision gears and shafts for final reduction components within the agricultural and off-highway vehicle.

The company is also known for supplying transmission and mechatronics for premium performance cars. Customers include McLaren, Ferrari, Lamborghini, Audi, Maserati, Alfa Romeo, Ford and Aston Martin, while some Mercedes-AMG models use the Graziano Power Transfer Unit. Competitors are Germans ZF Friedrichshafen, Getrag and BorgWarner which produce modules for the Volkswagen DSG gearbox.

== History ==
Graziano Trasmissioni was started in 1951 as a small family company with 15 employees by Carlo Graziano. In 1963, the company moved to its present headquarters in Cascine Vica. After 1981, the company's export activity increased progressively. The company then expanded, opening a factory in India in 1999, another in Suzhou (China) in 2006 and a third in Červený Kostelec (Czech Republic), in 2006.

In 2007, it merged with North American Fairfield, becoming Oerlikon Drive Systems, part of the Oerlikon Group.

In March 2019, the Drive Systems segment of the Oerlikon Group, including the Graziano and Fairfield brands, was purchased by Dana Incorporated and have become product brands of the company.

== Applications ==
From 1996 to 1997, Graziano cooperated with Ferrari, developing and supplying complete gearboxes for the Ferrari 360, 612 Scaglietti, Enzo, F430, 575M Maranello.

The Lamborghini Aventador uses a single-clutch lightweight 7-speed automated manual gearbox built by Graziano. Despite being single-clutch, gear-shifts are accomplished in 50ms. The Gallardo and the first-generation Audi R8 used a mid-engine Graziano gearbox (manual or automated manual versions).

The DCT gearbox used in the Audi R8 was developed in partnership with Graziano. It is built and pretested at Graziano's Luserna plant in Italy before shipment to Volkswagen's Kassel plant in Germany, where the clutch and mechatronics modules are added. The finished transmission is then sent to Audi.

The Aston Martin One-77, Vantage S, V8 Vantage, Aston Martin DB9 and Maserati GranTurismo S use rear-transaxle gearboxes, while the Maserati Quattroporte and Coupé & Spyder Trofeo- GranSport had an MT-AMT automated manual gearboxes.

The 2014 McLaren 650S uses the second generation of the SSG, with revised software which improves shifting times by further 0.3s.

Graziano supplies the 2020 Aston Martin Victor with its manual gearbox to handle its 614 lb⋅ft (832 N⋅m) of torque.

It is now also used in the Noble M500 equipped with a 6 speed manual transmission.

== See also ==
- List of Italian companies
