= McLaren 570S =

Sports car

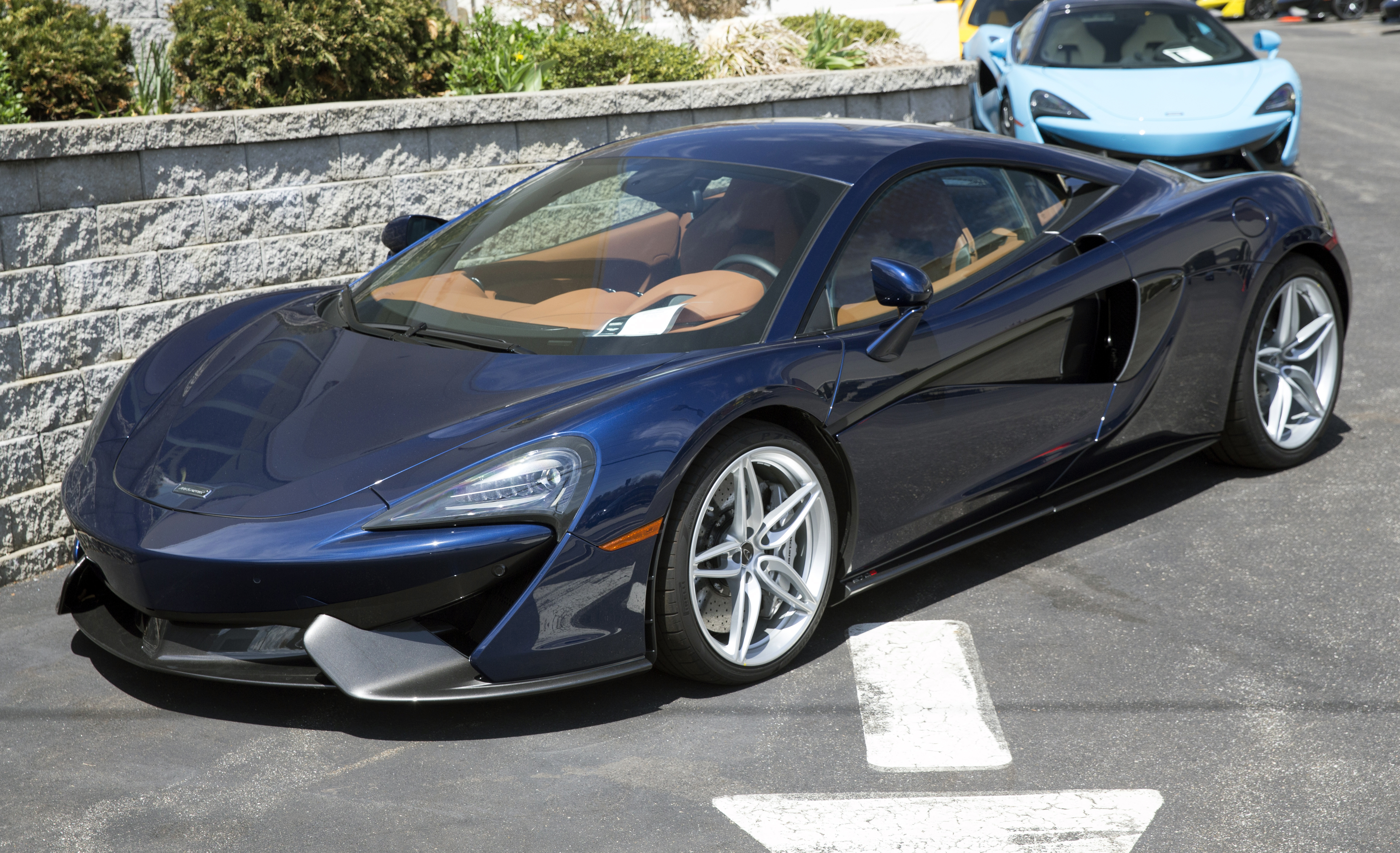

Overview
- Manufacturer: McLaren Automotive
- Production: 2015–2021
- Assembly: United Kingdom: Woking, Surrey, England
- Designer: Rob Melville

Body and chassis
- Class: Sports car (S)
- Body style: 2-door coupé 2-door retractable hard-top convertible
- Layout: Rear mid-engine, rear-wheel drive
- Platform: Carbon Monocell II carbon fibre monocoque
- Doors: Dihedral
- Related: McLaren GT; McLaren 675LT; McLaren 600LT; McLaren P1

Powertrain
- Engine: 3.8 L M838T E twin-turbo V8
- Power output: 570 PS (419 kW; 562 hp)
- Transmission: 7-speed Graziano SSG dual-clutch

Dimensions
- Wheelbase: 105.1 in (2,670 mm)
- Length: 178.3 in (4,529 mm)
- Width: 75.4 in (1,915 mm)
- Height: 47.3 in (1,201 mm)
- Kerb weight: 1,356 kg (2,989 lb) (570S coupé) (dry); 1,452 kg (3,201 lb) (570S coupé) (with fluids); 1,310 kg (2,890 lb) (540C) (dry); 1,438 kg (3,170 lb) (540C) (with fluids); 1,359 kg (2,996 lb) (570S Spider) (dry); 1,498 kg (3,303 lb) (570S Spider) (with fluids); 1,247 kg (2,749 lb) (600LT) (dry)

Chronology
- Successor: McLaren Artura; McLaren GT (570GT)

The McLaren 570S is a sports car designed and manufactured by the British car manufacturer McLaren Automotive, produced from 2015 until 2021. It was unveiled at the 2015 New York International Auto Show.

== Design and specifications ==
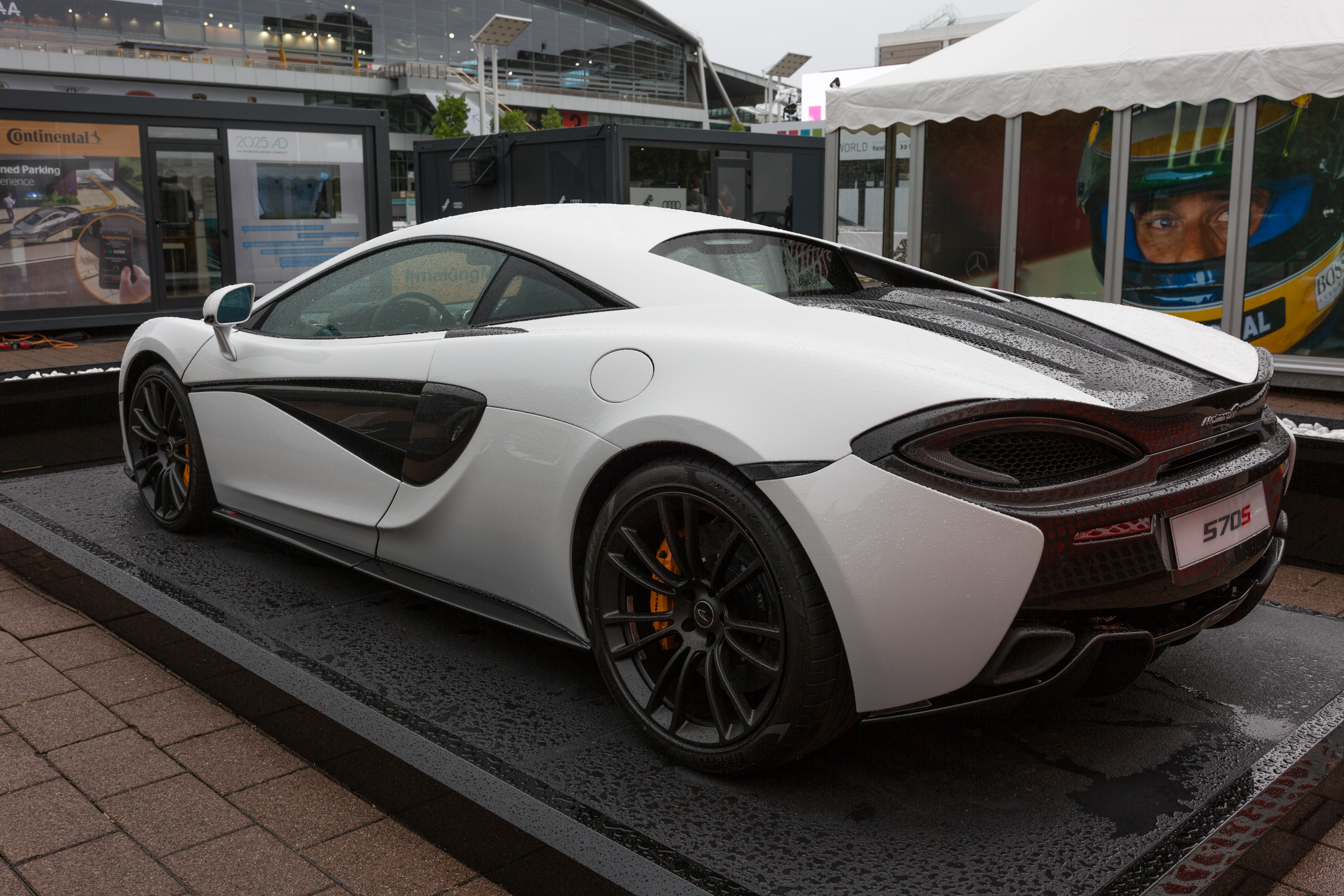
McLaren 570S

The car is powered by a new iteration of the 3.8-litre twin-turbocharged V8 engine already used in the 650S and P1, designated M838T E with thirty per cent of the parts redesigned. It delivers 562 hp (570 PS; 419 kW) and 443 lb⋅ft (601 N⋅m) of torque through a 7-speed dual-clutch transmission developed by Graziano Trasmissioni, as it is arranged in the car as a rear-mid engine configuration, The car can accelerate from 0–62 mph (0–100 km/h) in 3.2 seconds and can achieve a top speed of 204 mph (328 km/h). A total dry weight of 2,989 lb (1,356 kg) and maximum weight of 3,201 lb (1,452 kg) gives the 570S a power to weight ratio of 428 PS per tonne delivering a fuel economy of 25.5 miles per imperial gallon (11.1 L/100 km; 21.2 mpg_{‑US}) and CO_{2} emissions of 249 g/km.

McLaren focused on delivering "day-to-day usability and driveability" against the most sporting model options in its range with increased luggage space, greater interior storage and leather upholstery options. The car is designed with aerodynamics in mind and the teardrop shaped cockpit helps achieve that objective. The rear of the car is inspired by the P1 and borrows the slim LED tail lights and diffuser styling from the flagship sports car. The car features dihedral doors, a trademark of McLaren as featured on its ultimate and super series cars.

== Production Variants ==
=== 540C ===
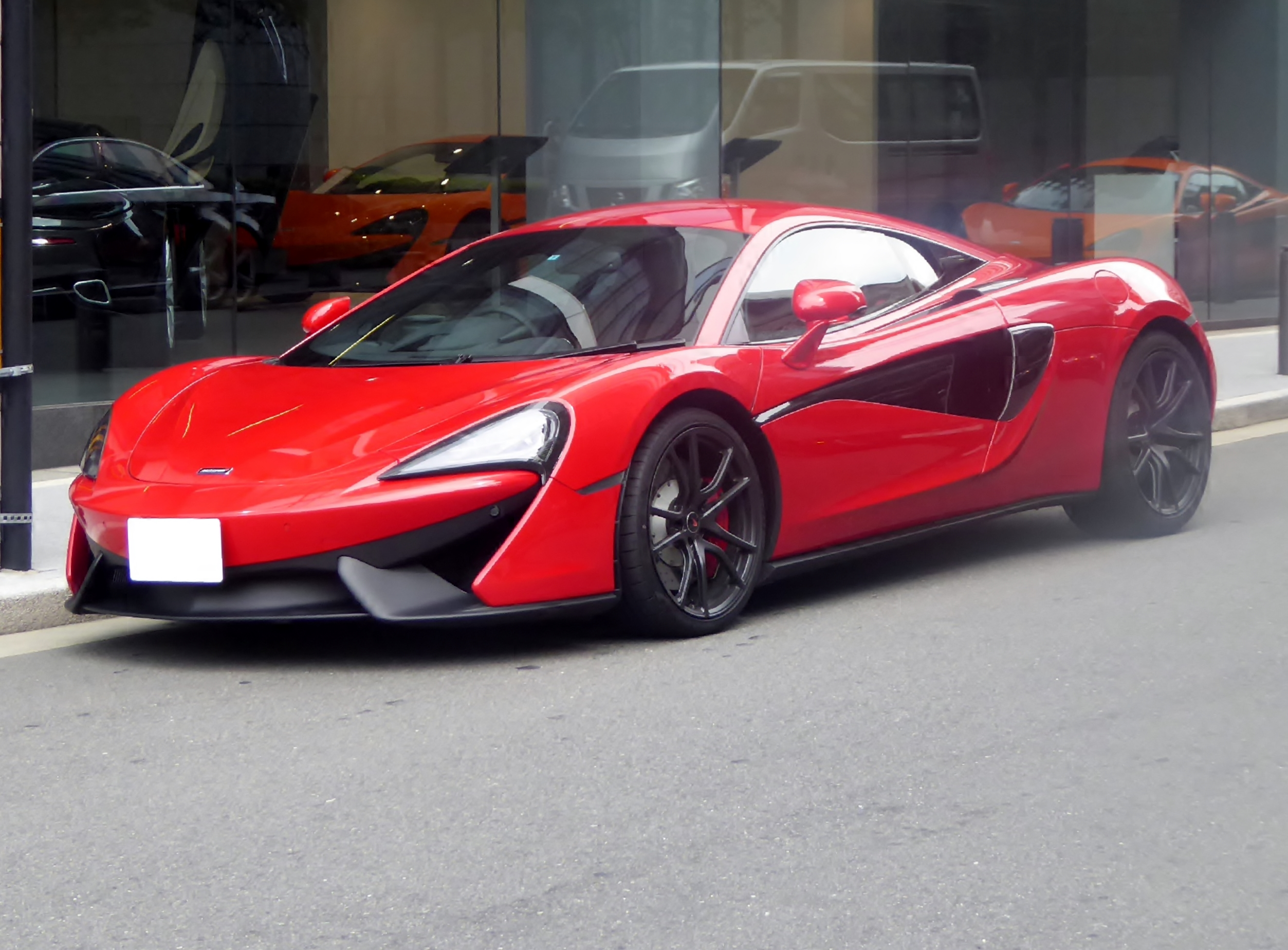
McLaren 540C

At the 2015 Shanghai Motor Show, the entry level McLaren Sports Series car named 540C was unveiled with 533 hp (540 PS; 397 kW) and 540 N⋅m (398 lb⋅ft) of torque. This new entry-level model focuses on "day-to-day usability and driveability" even more than that of the 570S with improved city driving and ride quality. The car can accelerate from 0–60 mph (0–97 km/h) in 3.4 seconds and has a top speed of 199 mph (320 km/h). The 540C is cheaper than the 570S and went on sale shortly after its Shanghai debut. The 540C is not available in the US due to McLaren wanting to focus on the more powerful 570S model for the US market.

=== 570GT ===
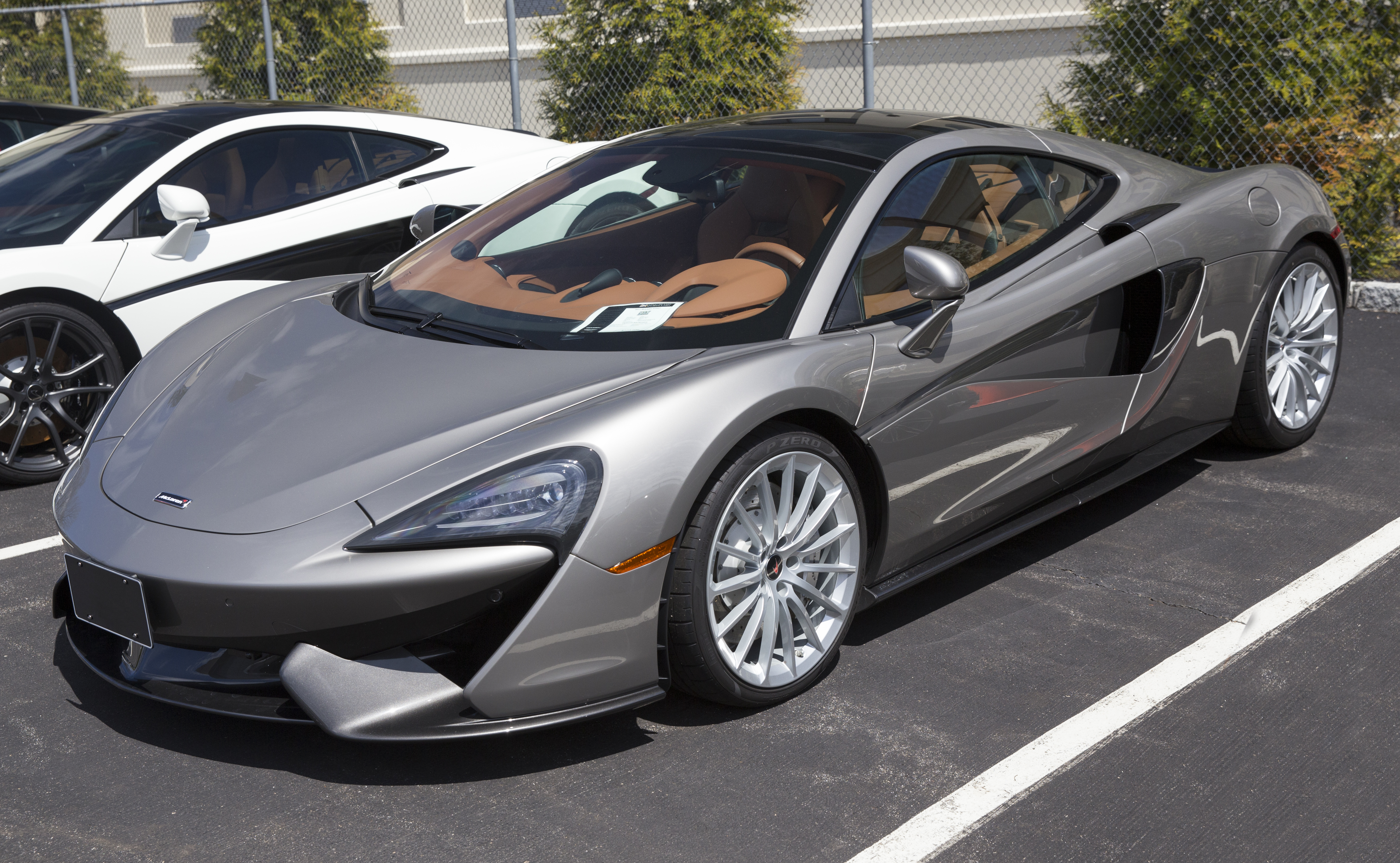
McLaren 570GT

At the 2016 Geneva Motor Show, McLaren presented another addition to the Sport Series and 570 line up, dubbed the 570GT. The 570GT is the less track focused, and more road trip worthy version of the 570S. The 570GT sports a side opening cargo hatch above the mid-mounted engine for additional cargo space in place of the engine cover of the 570S, slightly softer suspension settings and improved sound insulation. The 570GT went through a facelift at the start of 2018 which added ceramic brakes as standard and steel as a free option.

=== 570S Spider ===
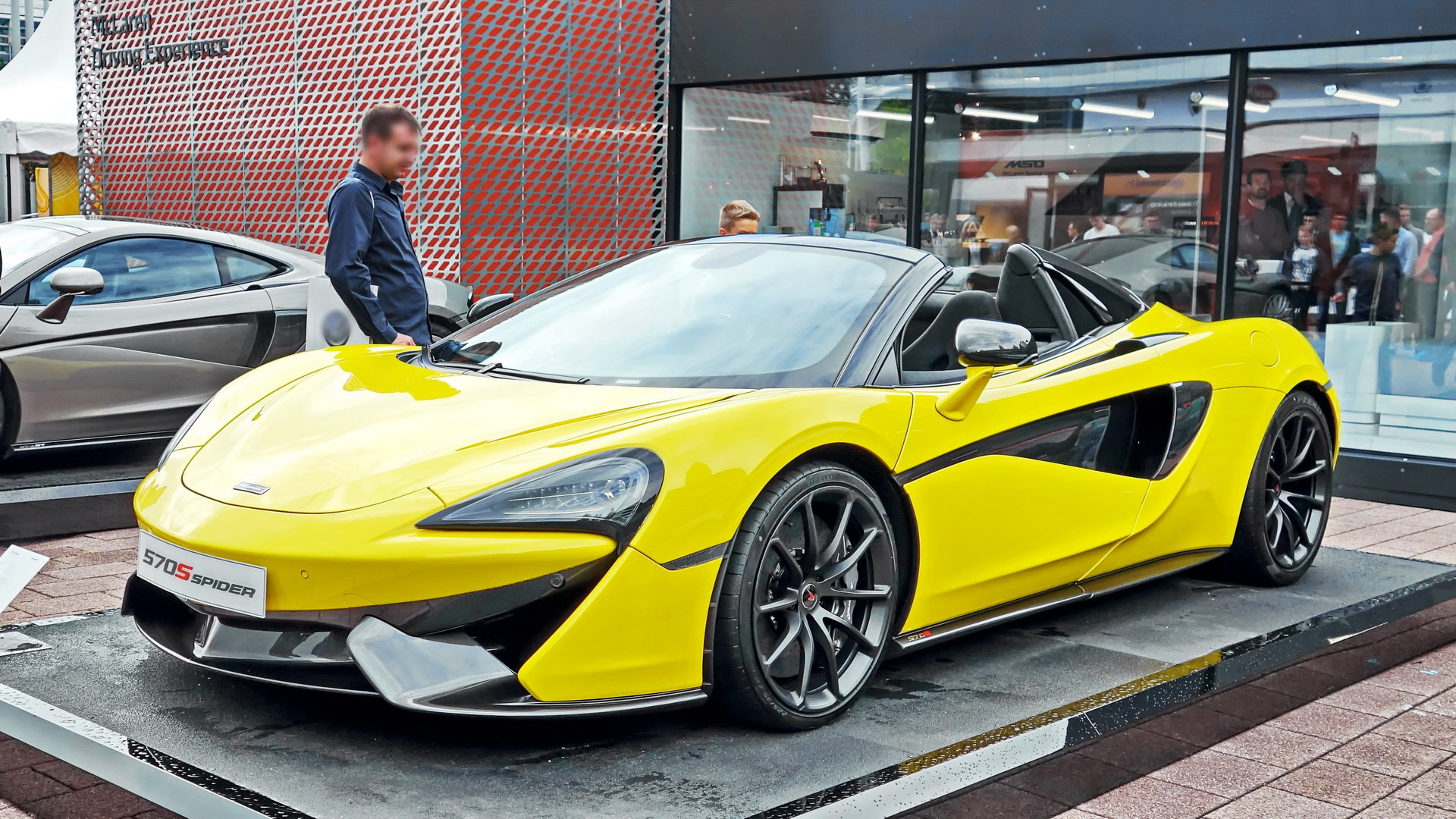
McLaren 570S Spider

The convertible version of the 570S was unveiled at the 2017 Goodwood Festival of Speed event. It borrows the roof folding mechanism from the Super Series line-up. The two-piece aluminium roof folds into a compartment located behind the seats of the car leaving the rear buttress in place. The roof folding mechanism takes 30 seconds to fold and unfold and is operable at speeds up to 48 km/h (30 mph). Unlike the 12C Spider and the 650S Spider, the 570S spider required no significant reengineering for the folding roof mechanism because of the carbon monocell used in the 570S. As a result, the 570S Spider is only 46 kg (101 lb) heavier than the coupe. The drivetrain of the Spider remains identical to that of the coupe which results in similar performance to the coupé counterpart with the roof up. The Spider has new forged aluminium wheels and three special launch colours namely Vega Blue, Sicilian Yellow and Ventura Orange. Deliveries of the Spider began in late 2017.

=== 600LT ===
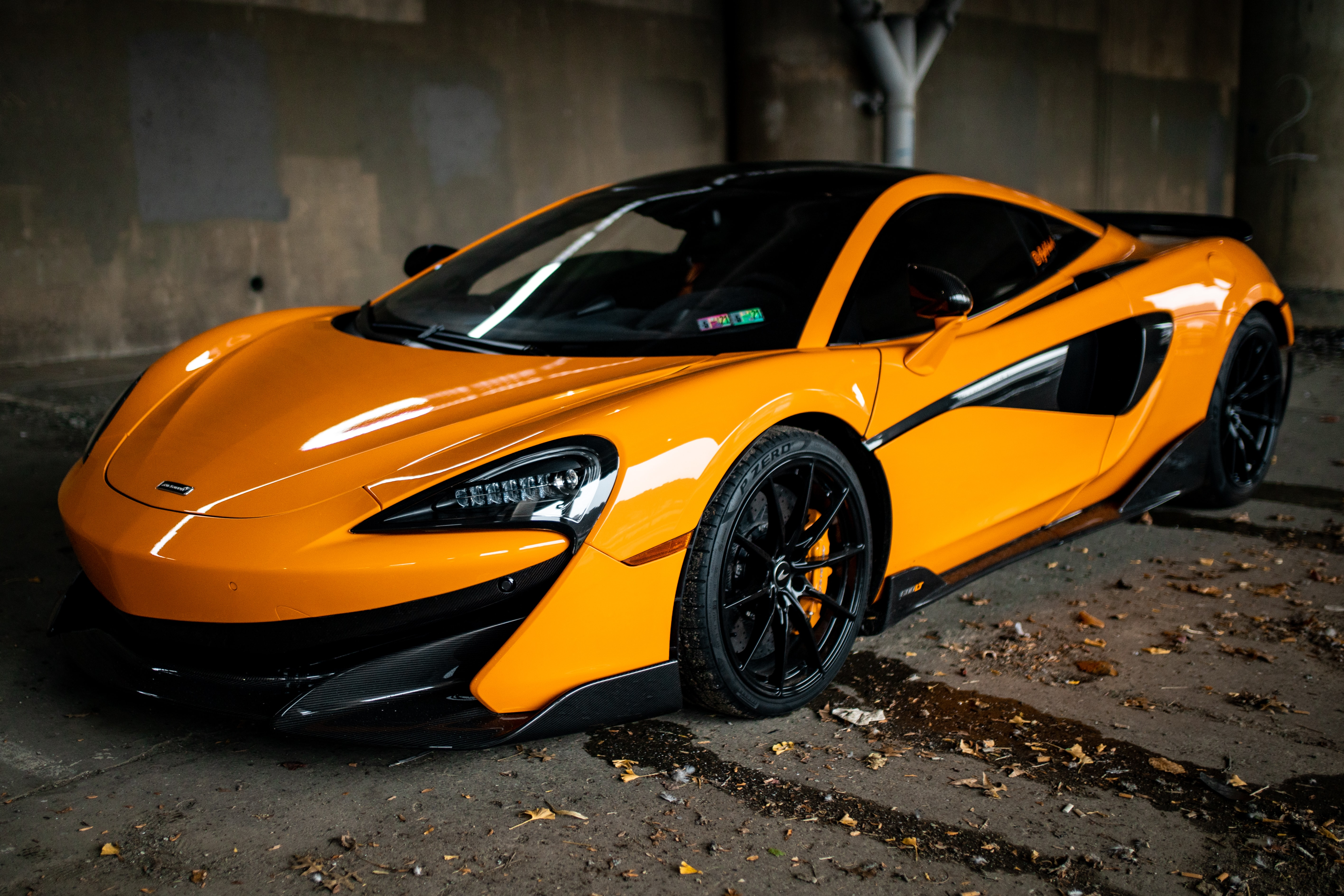
McLaren 600LT

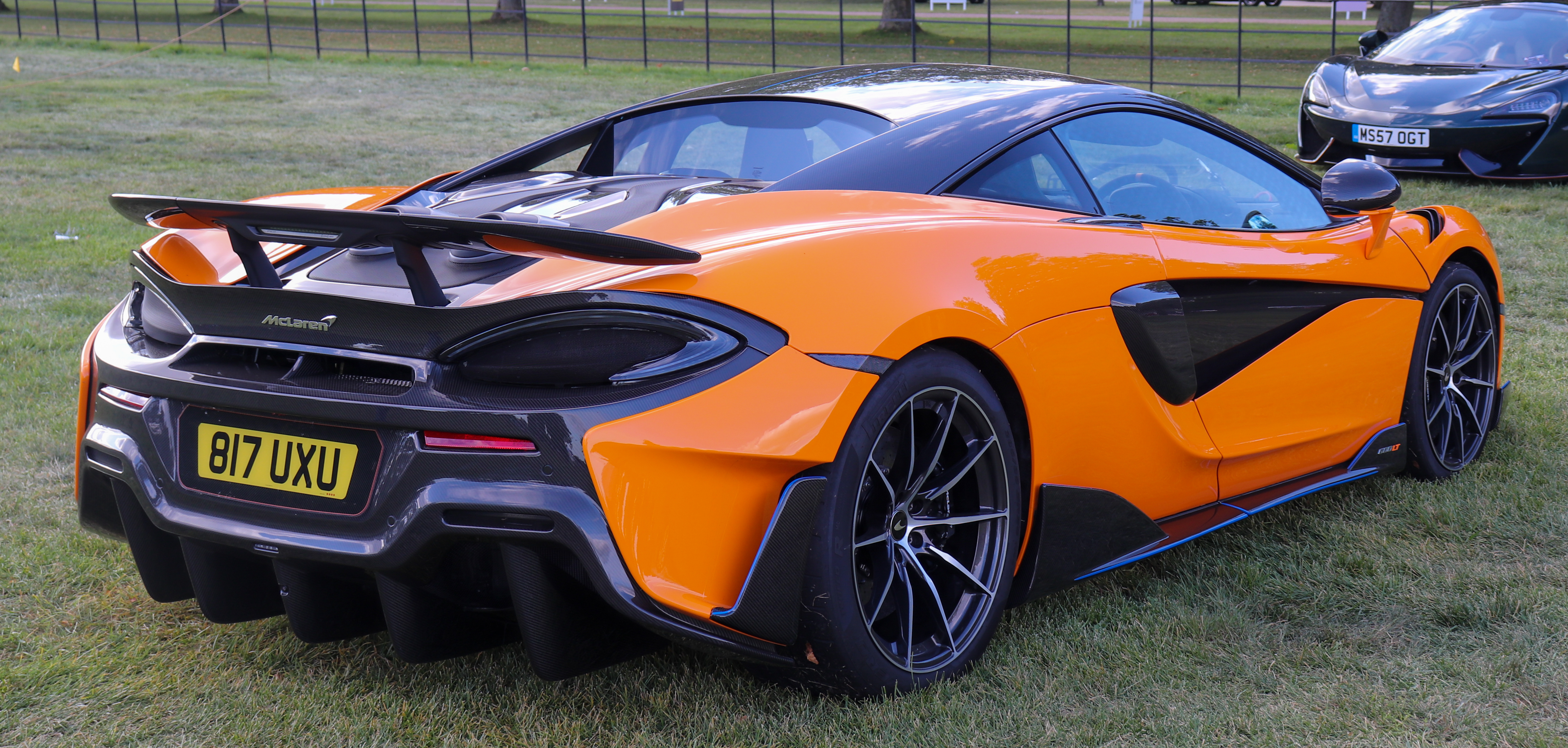
McLaren 600LT

In June 2018, McLaren unveiled the top-of-the-line sports series variant online. The car, called the 600LT is based on the 570S and is the third McLaren production car to receive the longtail treatment. Inspired by the 675LT and the F1 GTR Longtail, the body of the car has been extended by 73.7 mm (2.9 in). The car also features enhanced aerodynamic elements such as an extended front splitter and rear diffuser, new side sills, and an aero-enhancing fixed rear wing for increased downforce. McLaren claims that 23% parts on the 600LT are new as compared to the 570S. The carbon fibre monocoque utilised in the 600LT is modified and this combined with the extensive use of carbon fibre in the roof along with the cantrails and front fenders, results in a weight saving of 96 kg (212 lb) over the 570S, with the total weight amounting to 1,247 kg (2,749 lb). Another distinguishing feature of the 600LT is the lightweight titanium exhaust system which is mounted on top of the rear of the car which harks back to its original application in the Senna. The interior features sports bucket seats from the P1 and Alcantara trim but can be optioned with the much lighter bucket seats found in the Senna. The 3.8-litre twin-turbocharged V8 engine utilised in the 600LT is tuned to produce a maximum power output of 600 PS (441 kW; 592 hp), hence the 600 in the name, and 620 N⋅m (457 lb⋅ft) of torque. This adds up to a power-to-weight ratio of 479 PS per tonne. Production of the 600LT started in October 2018.

=== 600LT Spider ===
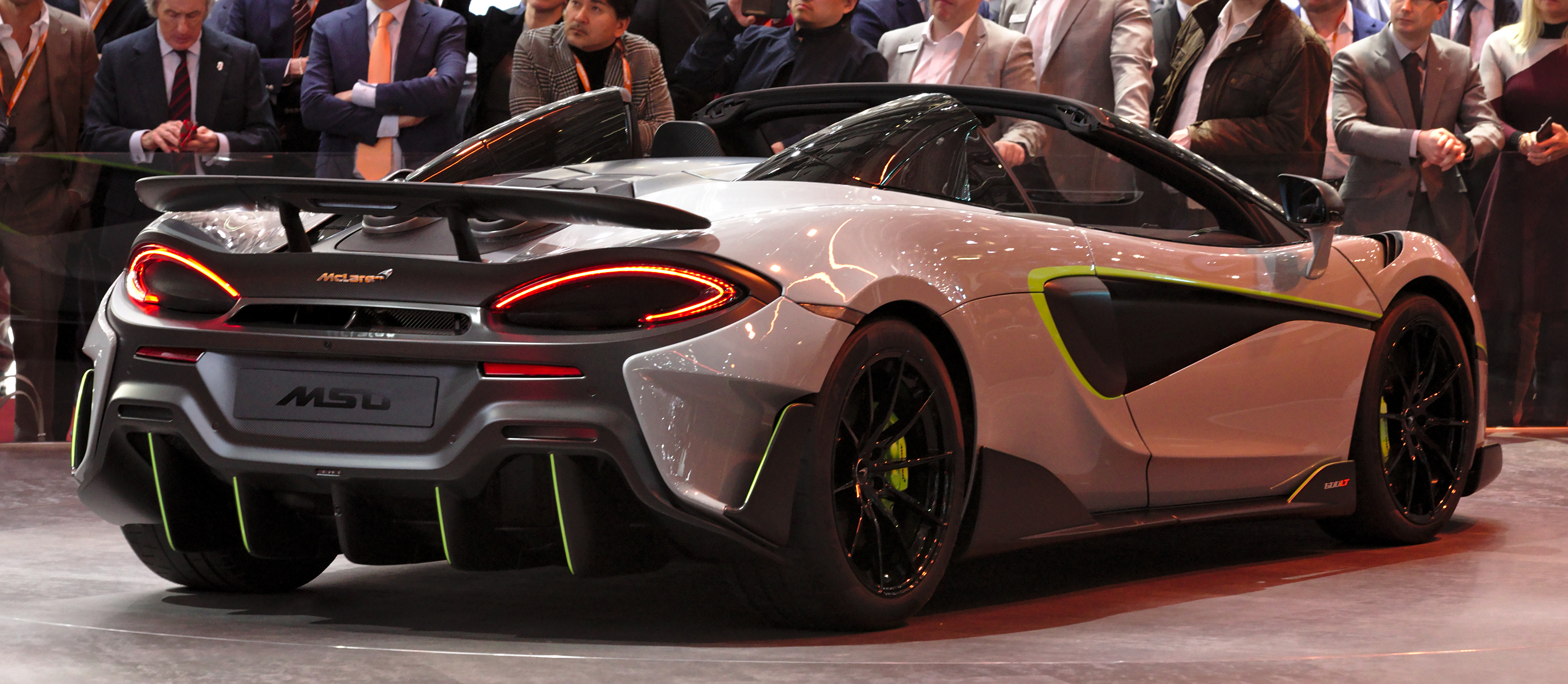
McLaren 600LT Spider

In January 2019, McLaren unveiled the convertible variant of the 600LT at the Detroit Auto Show. Due to the use of the same carbon monocoque as the other models in the 570S lineage, the 600LT Spider did not require any extra modifications to incorporate a folding hardtop roof. As a result, the Spider weighs 50 kg (110 lb) more than the coupé while maintaining the same performance statistics. The Spider has the same engine and aerodynamic components as the coupé and shares the roof folding mechanism with the standard 570S Spider which can be operated at speeds up to 40 km/h (25 mph).

The car can accelerate to 100 km/h (62 mph) in 2.9 seconds, to 200 km/h (124 mph) in 8.4 seconds (0.2 seconds more than the coupé) and can attain a top speed of 315 km/h (196 mph) with the roof retracted and 323 km/h (201 mph) with the roof closed.

The car can achieve a dry weight of 1,297 kg (2,859 lb) when equipped with the MSO ClubSport package which includes the removal of air-conditioning and radio, titanium wheel nuts and the replacement of the standard seats with the carbon fibre seats from the Senna. The car is the fifth McLaren model to have the Long Tail name.

=== 620R ===
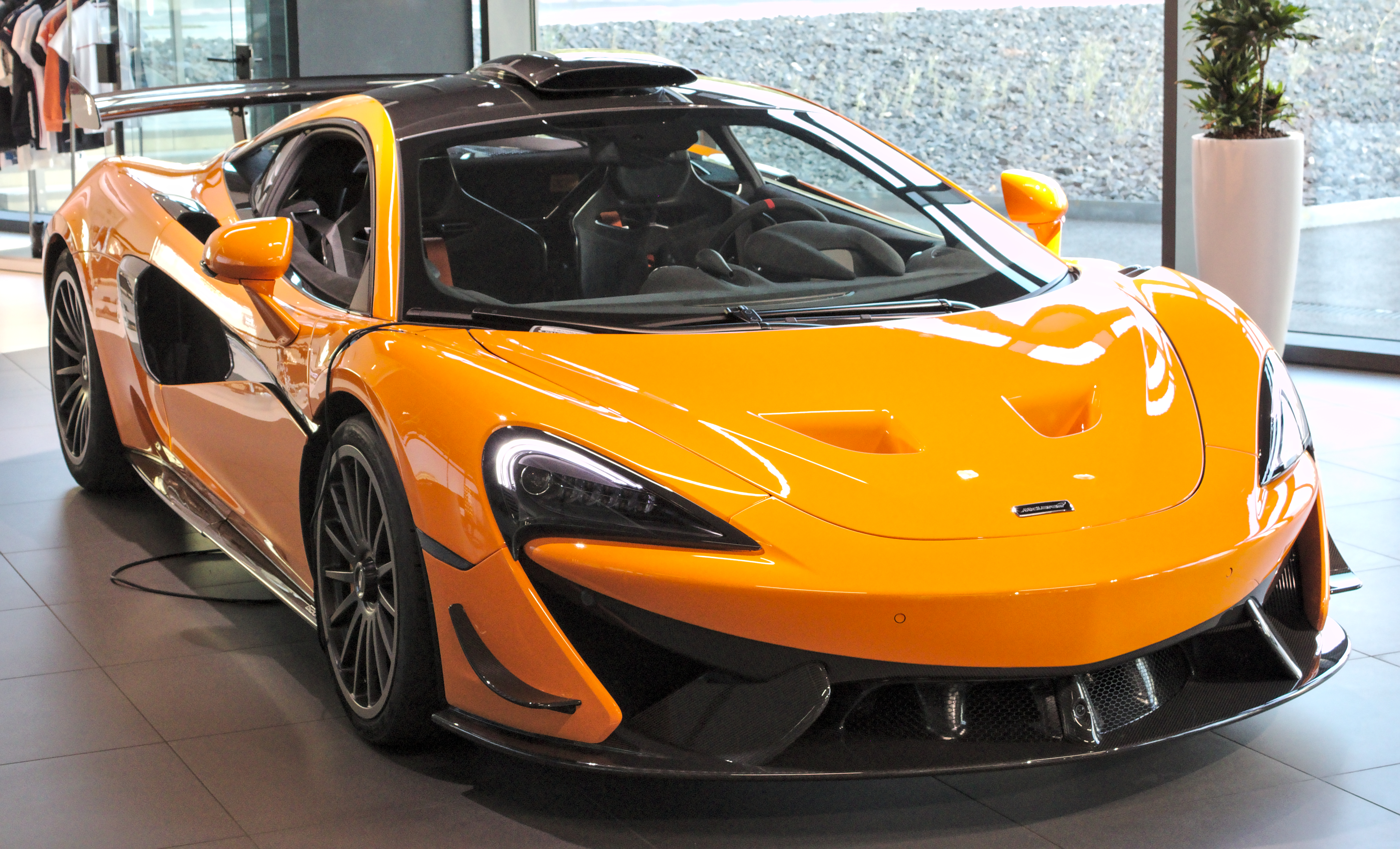
McLaren 620R

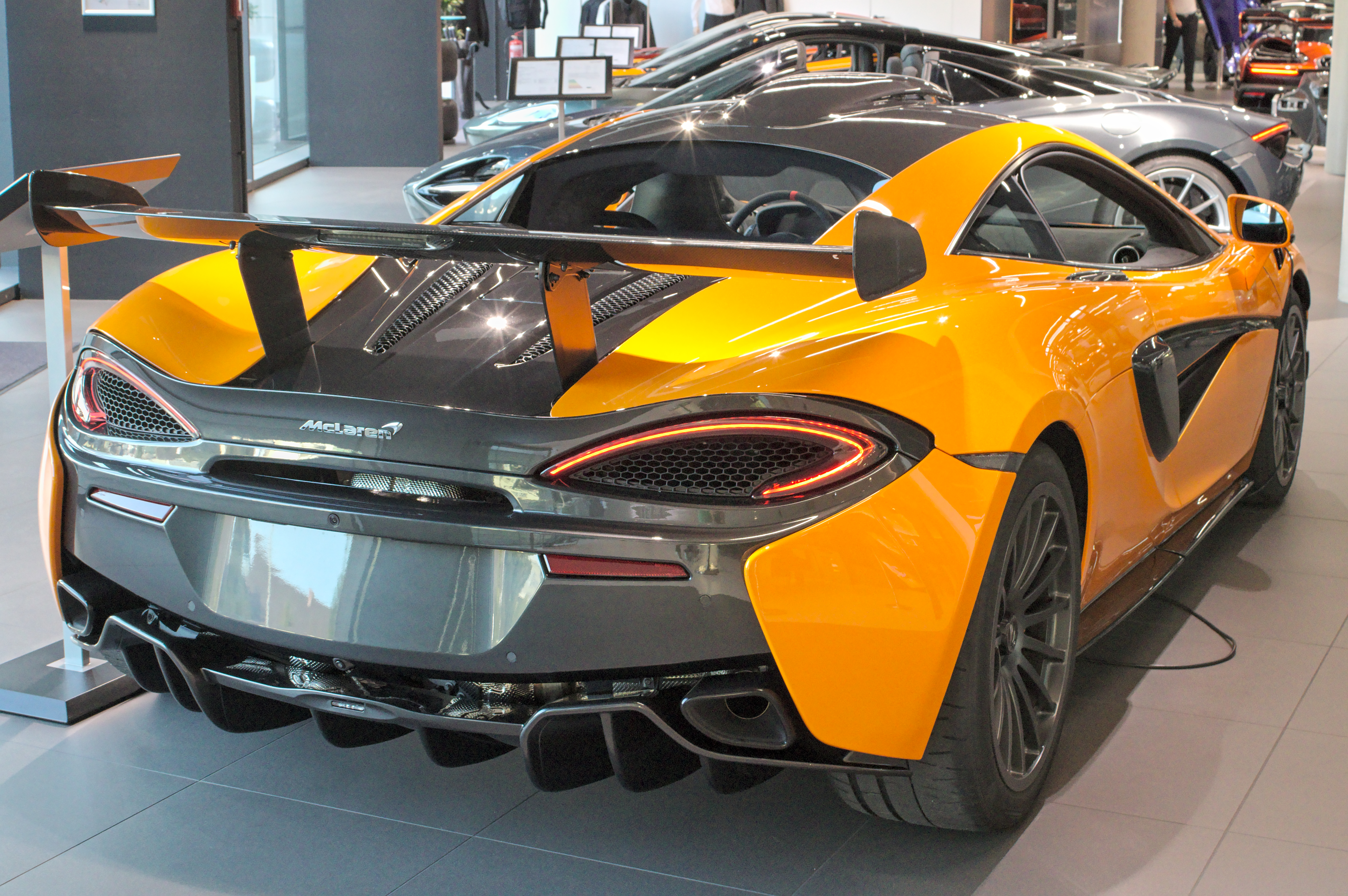
McLaren 620R

Unveiled online in December 2019, the 620R is a road legal iteration of the 570S GT4 race car. The car shares its Monocell II carbon fibre monocoque chassis with the 570S GT4 race car as well as the engine which, not subject to racing restrictions and ECU changes is now rated at 620 PS (456 kW; 612 hp) and 620 N⋅m (457 lb⋅ft) making it McLaren's most powerful sports series model. Other changes include semi-slick Pirelli P zero Trofeo R tyres with track only Pirelli racing slicks being optional, a bare minimum racing interior with the carpeting removed, carbon fibre racing seats with six-point harness, door pull straps, carbon fibre shift paddles, 12 o'clock mark on the steering wheel, McLaren Track Telemetry system (MTT) and deletion of air-conditioning and infotainment system; although they are available as no cost options, adjustable coilover motorsport dampers; which feature 32 individual settings per corner to allow the driver to tailor rebound and compression rates to their preferred settings, stiffer anti-roll bars have and track-focused carbon-ceramic brakes with 390 mm brake discs at the front and 380 mm brake discs at the rear with forged aluminum calipers. The adjustable rear wing made from carbon fibre is shared with the 570S GT4 and allows the 620R to generate 185 kg (408 lb) of downforce at a speed of 250 km/h (155 mph). The large wheel sizes of the car (19 inch at the front, 20 inch at the rear) allow for no mechanical adjustment when the standard tires are switched for racing slicks. The rear wing has an integrated third brake light to make the car road legal.

Performance figures include 0-100 km/h (62 mph) acceleration time of 2.9 seconds, 0-200 km/h (124 mph) acceleration time of 8.1 seconds and a top speed of 322 km/h (200 mph) which is less than the 600LT due to the car's focus on aerodynamic enhancements. The production of the 620R was limited to 350 units, but due to COVID-19 complications, and a very poor marketing campaign on behalf of McLaren, only 225 units were produced. Each car came with a numbered plaque on the interior. Three basic interior colours were offered: Onyx Black with orange racing stripes, Silica White with orange racing stripes, and McLaren Orange with white racing stripes. A special colour palette was offered by MSO along with a livery inspired by the Senna GTR.

== Specialist Variants ==
=== 570S GT4 and Sprint ===
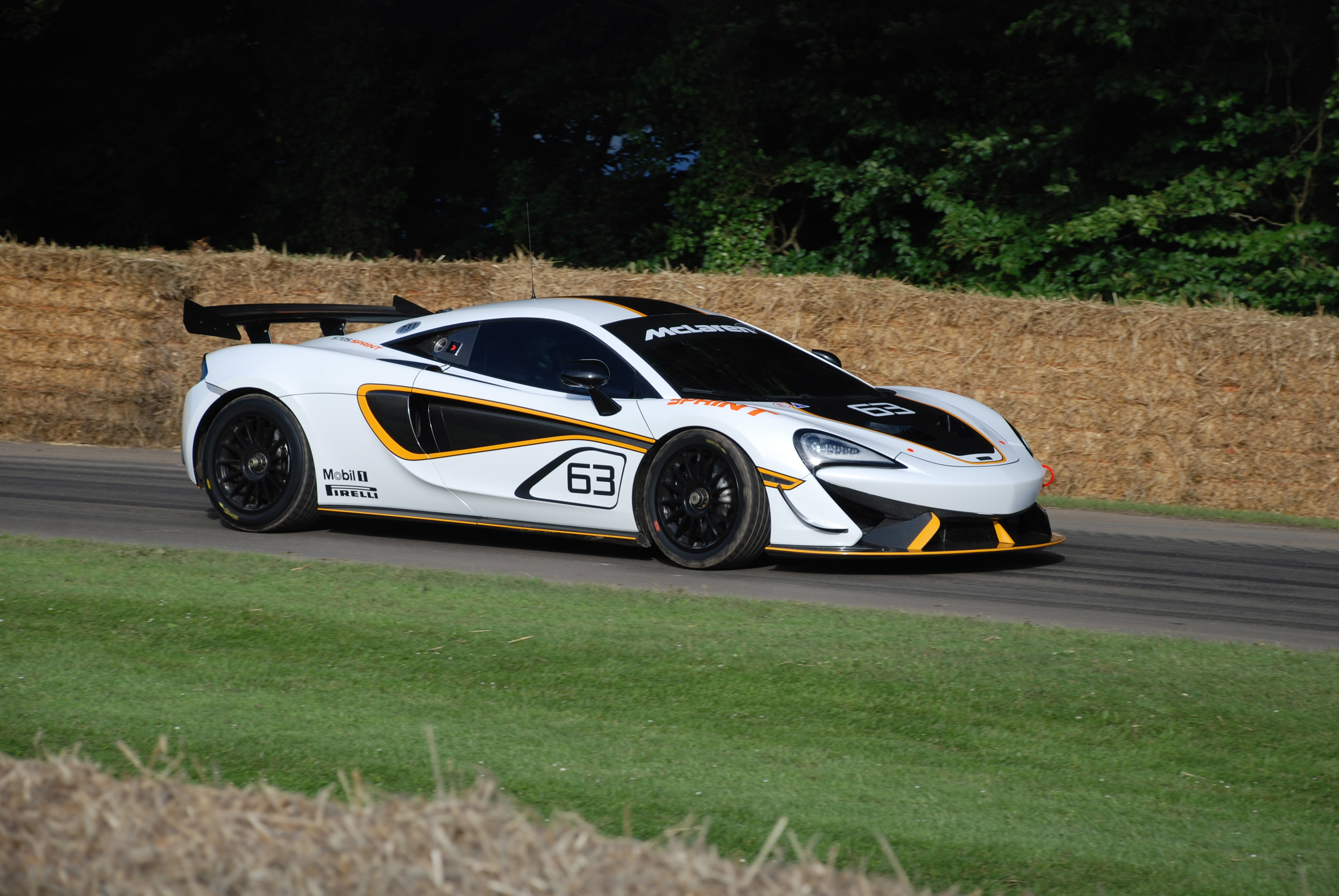
McLaren 570S Sprint

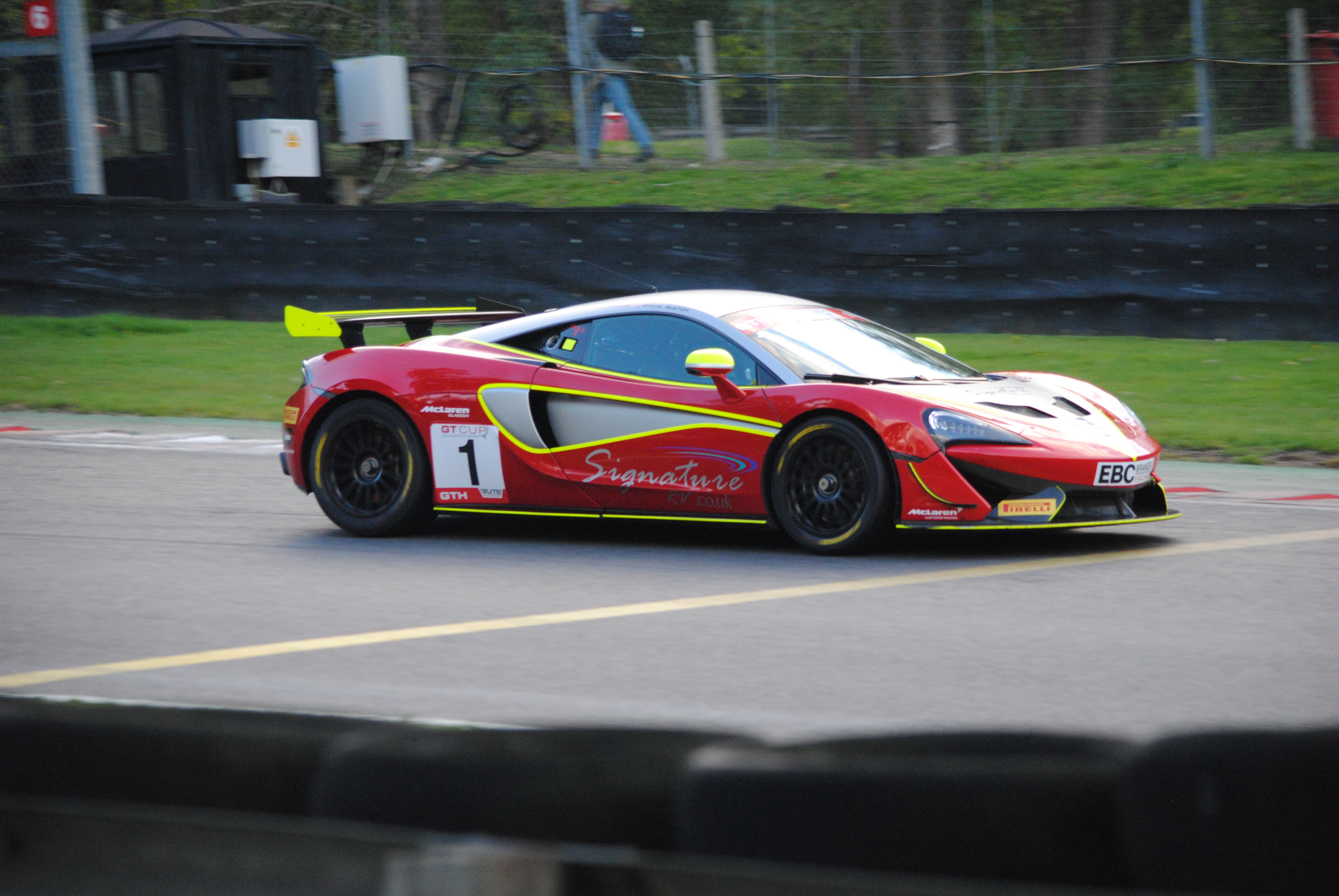
McLaren 570S GT4

Announced online in early 2016, and making their public debut at the Goodwood Festival of Speed, the 570S GT4 and 570S Sprint are the track oriented iterations of the 570S. McLaren disclosed shortly after the announcement, that the track cars were built alongside their base model. Changes include a new air jack suspension system, racing style aero package, and center-lock magnesium alloys wrapped in Pirelli racing slicks. McLaren also added a new race style cooling system and radiator, but the powertrain remained unchanged. The GT4 made its racing debut at the British GT Championship in April 2016. The 570S Sprint has been made commercially available for customers. The Sprint was built alongside the GT4 counterpart, but without the FIA restrictions required on the GT4. The car can be updated to the GT4 specifications at the owner's request.

=== MSO X ===
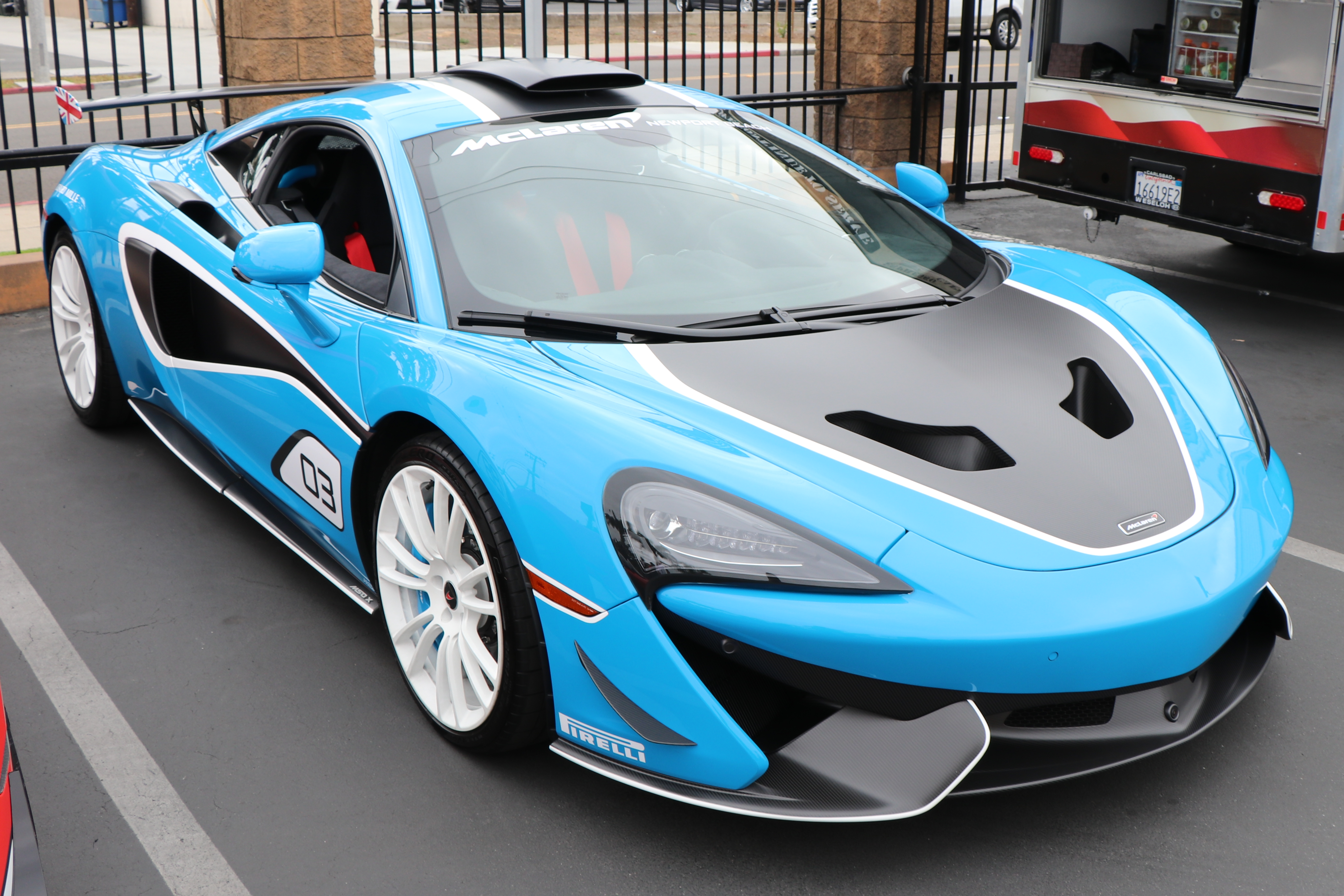
MSO X

To celebrate the Daytona 24 event, McLaren Newport Beach, the US dealer of McLaren commissioned ten bespoke cars from McLaren Special Operations based on the 570S GT4 race car, called the McLaren MSO X, created to create the feel of the GT4 race car without taking away everyday road usability, created from the standard McLaren 570S. The exterior of the car takes heavy influence from the GT4 race car and includes a carbon fibre roof with a functional 'goose neck' air intake mounted on the top which exits from a modified rear fascia, GT4 style rear wing which creates 100 kg (220 lb) of additional downforce, functional air intakes on the bonnet, tow hooks on the front and rear and a titanium exhaust system. The interior of the car is also designed to simulate the GT4 racer without taking away the creature comforts and includes exposed carbon fibre monocell throughout, carbon fibre racing bucket seats with customizable six point racing harness, Alcantara interior trim and a carbon fibre bulkhead located at the rear to store the helmets of the occupants while keeping the air conditioning system, parking assist, front lift system and GPS navigation system as standard equipment. The storage locker in the dashboard and the storage compartments at the front and rear have been removed in order to accommodate the air intakes and to keep the car feel as close to the race car as possible. All the ten cars feature distinctive liveries inspired by the iconic liveries featuring on the McLaren F1 GTR which competed in LeMans during the 1990s. The ten cars were delivered to their owners at an event organized at McLaren Newport Beach in January 2018. Like the 570S which it is based from, it shares the same performance figures.
