= McLaren M840T engine =

Overview
- Manufacturer: McLaren & Ricardo
- Designer: Tom Walkinshaw Racing
- Production: 2017-present

Layout
- Configuration: 90° flat-plane V8
- Displacement: 3,994 cc (243.7 cu in)
- Cylinder bore: 93 mm (3.66 in)
- Piston stroke: 73.5 mm (2.89 in)
- Valvetrain: 32-valve (4 valves x cyl.), DOHC

RPM range
- Max. engine speed: 8,500

Combustion
- Turbocharger: MHI twin-turbo that produced over 1.3 bar (18.85 psi) of turbo boosting pressure with intercooler
- Fuel system: Multi-point electronic indirect fuel injection
- Fuel type: Unleaded petrol + Ethanol (both blends may vary) by Esso Synergy (2017-2020) later Gulf Pro/Endurance Fuels (2021-present)
- Oil system: Dry sump. Mobil 1 Racing (2017-2020) later Gulf Formula Elite 5W-40 fully-synthetic motor oil (2021-present)
- Cooling system: Water-cooled

Output
- Power output: 612–814 bhp (620–825 PS; 456–607 kW)
- Torque output: 465–590 lb⋅ft (630–800 N⋅m)

Dimensions
- Dry weight: 170 kg (375 lb)

Chronology
- Predecessor: McLaren M838T
- Successor: McLaren MHP-8

The McLaren M840T engine is a 4.0 L (244.1 cu in), 90-degree, twin-turbocharged, flat-plane V8 petrol engine, designed, developed and produced by McLaren, in partnership and collaboration with Ricardo, and introduced with their 720S sports car model, in 2017. It is an evolution of the M838T engine, introduced in 2011.

== Development ==
McLaren bought the intellectual property rights to the Tom Walkinshaw Racing developed engine, itself based on the Nissan VRH engine architecture, which was designed for the IRL IndyCar Series but never raced. However, other than the 93 mm (3.66 in) bore and 73.5 mm (2.89 in) stroke, little of that engine remains in the M840T.

Developed with help from Ricardo, the engine redlines at 8500 rpm, but 80% of the engine's torque is available as low as 2000 rpm. McLaren claims that the engine has the highest horsepower to CO_{2} emission ratio of any current production engine.

M840T engine uses double MHI turbochargers named TD05H-06*20HF1T-12T. Despite the name, these are not the same turbochargers which are used in the Mitsubishi Lancer Evo IX (X).

The engine is built at Ricardo's engine assembly facility in Shoreham-by-Sea, West Sussex.

== Applications ==
McLaren's new M840T engine debuted as an evolution of the M838T used in the 650S. It is a 3,994 cc (4.0 L; 243.7 cu in) twin-turbocharged V8 engine. However, the stroke has been lengthened by 3.6 mm to increase the capacity and 41% of the engine's components are new. The engine uses new twin-scroll turbochargers which have a low inertia titanium-aluminium turbines which spin with maximum efficiency with the help of actively controlled waste gates. The engine in the 720S was rated at a power output of 720 PS (530 kW; 710 hp) at 7,500 rpm, giving the car its name; the maximum torque is 568 lb⋅ft (770 N⋅m) at 5,500 rpm.

Models	Years	Codename	Power	Torque
720S	2017–2023	M840T	720 PS (530 kW; 710 bhp) @ 7500 rpm	770 N⋅m (568 lb⋅ft) @ 5500 rpm
720S GT3	2018–2022	M840T	720 PS (530 kW; 710 bhp) @ 7500 rpm	-
720S GT3X	2021–2022	M840T	720 PS (530 kW; 710 bhp) @ 7500 rpm	-
765LT	2020–2023	M840T	765 PS (563 kW; 755 bhp) @ 7500 rpm	800 N⋅m (590 lb⋅ft) @ 5500rpm
750S	2023–	M840T	750 PS (740 bhp)	800 N⋅m (590 lb⋅ft) @ 5500rpm
Senna	2018–2020	M840TR	800 PS (588 kW; 789 bhp) @ 7250 rpm	800 N⋅m (590 lb⋅ft) @ 5500rpm
Senna GTR	2019–2020	M840TR	825 PS (607 kW; 814 bhp)	800 N⋅m (590 lb⋅ft) @ 5500rpm
Senna GTR LM	2020	M840TR	845 PS (621 kW; 833 bhp)	800 N⋅m (590 lb⋅ft) @ 5500rpm
Elva	2020	M840TR	815 PS (599 kW; 804 bhp)	800 N⋅m (590 lb⋅ft) @ 5500rpm
Speedtail	2020	M840T	756 PS (556 kW; 746 bhp); Electric: 312 PS (229 kW; 308 bhp); Total: 1,050 PS (770 kW; 1,040 bhp)	800 N⋅m (590 lb⋅ft); Electric: 350 N⋅m (258 lb⋅ft); Total: 1,150 N⋅m (848 lb⋅ft)
GT	2019–2024	M840TE	620 PS (456 kW; 612 bhp) @ 7500 rpm	630 N⋅m (465 lb⋅ft) @ 5500 rpm
GTS	2024–	M840TE	635 PS (467 kW; 626 bhp) @ 7500 rpm	630 N⋅m (465 lb⋅ft) @ 5500 rpm
