= McLaren GT =

Grand-touring sports car

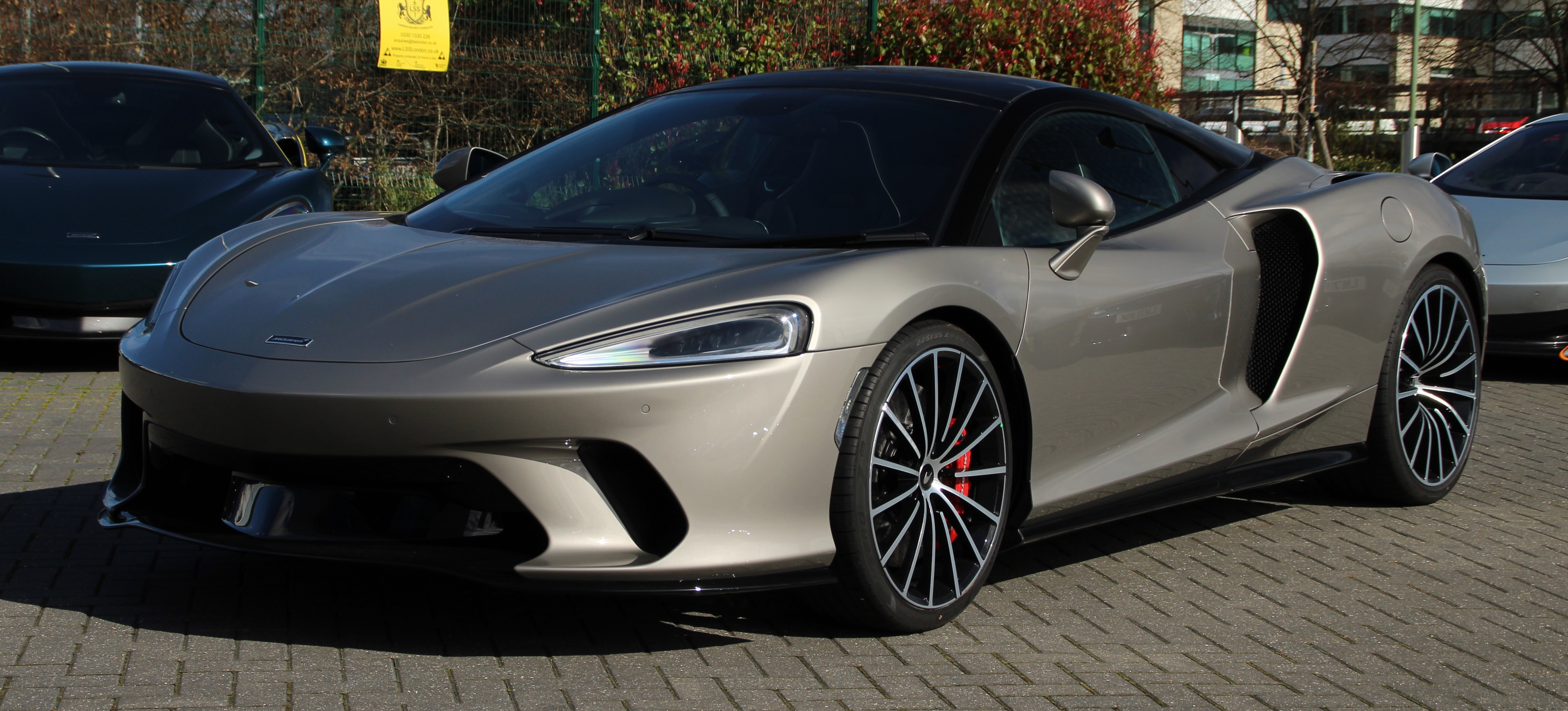

Overview
- Manufacturer: McLaren Automotive
- Production: 2019–2024 (GT); 2024–present (GTS)
- Assembly: United Kingdom: Woking, Surrey, England
- Designer: Rob Melville

Body and chassis
- Class: Grand tourer (S)
- Layout: Rear mid-engine, rear-wheel drive
- Platform: MonoCell II-T carbon-fibre monocoque
- Doors: Butterfly
- Related: McLaren 720S; McLaren 570S

Powertrain
- Engine: 4.0 L M840TE twin-turbocharged V8
- Power output: 620 PS (456 kW; 612 hp)
- Transmission: 7-speed dual-clutch

Dimensions
- Wheelbase: 2,670 mm (105.1 in)
- Length: 4,683 mm (184.4 in)
- Width: 2,095 mm (82.5 in)
- Height: 1,213 mm (47.8 in)
- Kerb weight: 1,530 kg (3,373 lb)

Chronology
- Predecessor: McLaren 570GT
- Successor: McLaren GTS

The McLaren GT is a two seat grand tourer designed and manufactured by the British automobile manufacturer McLaren Automotive. It is the company's first dedicated grand tourer and is based on the same platform underpinning the 720S with the addition of a carbon fibre rear deck topped by a glazed tailgate creating significantly greater storage capacity.

The GT was first announced at the 2019 Geneva Motor Show, but full details of the car were not released until May 15 of the same year.

== Specifications ==
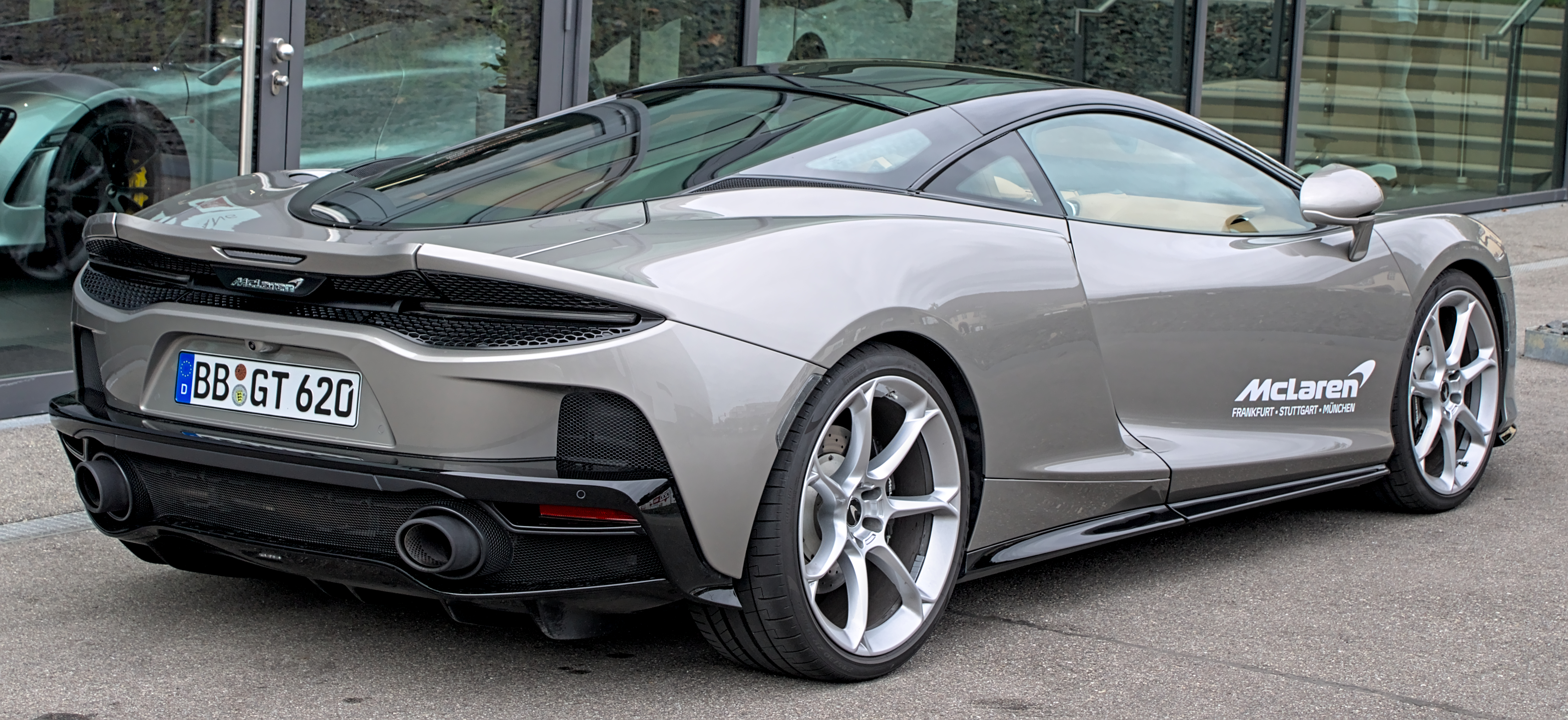
2021 GT

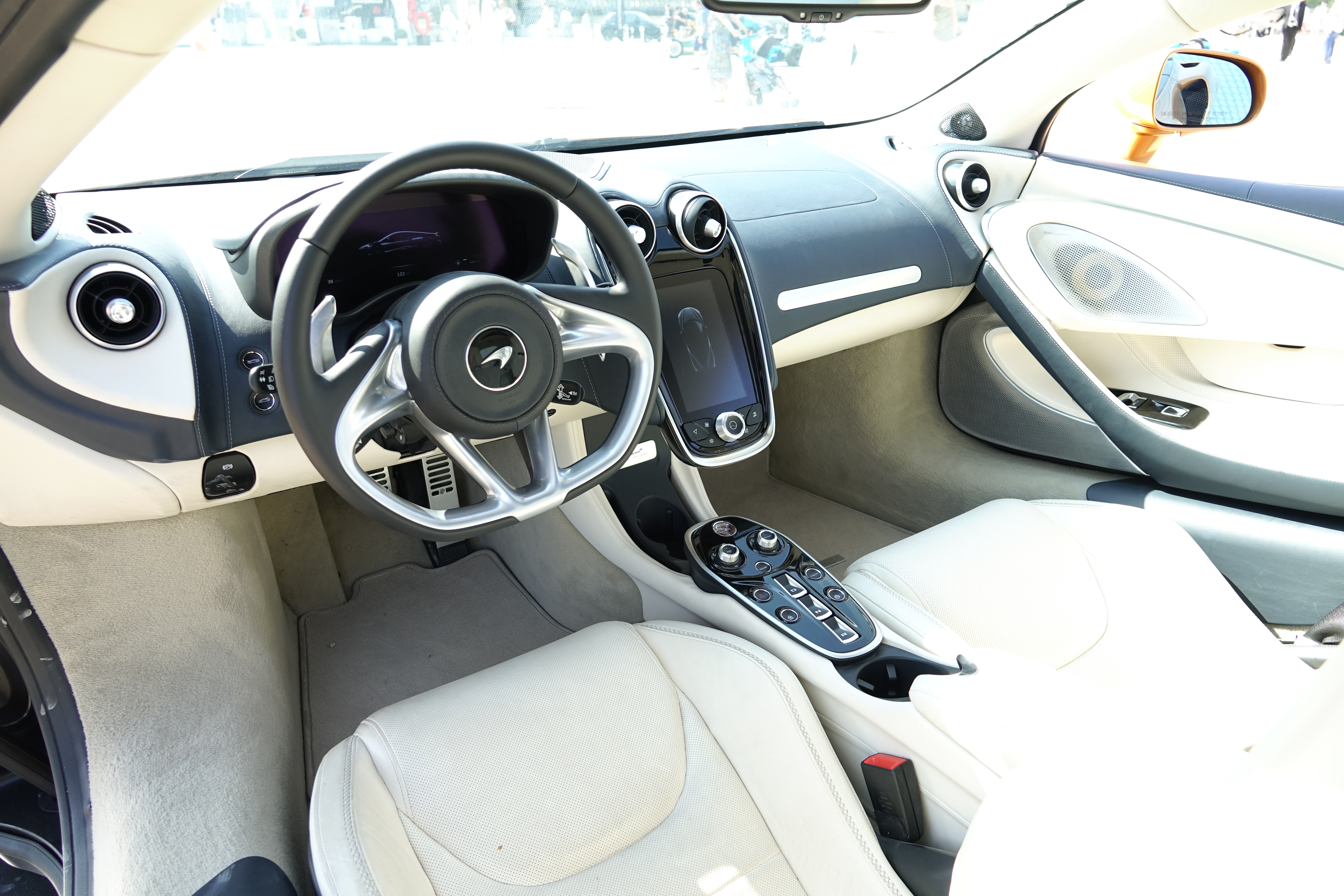
Interior

=== Engine ===
The GT features a new variation of the 3,994 cc (4.0 L; 243.7 cu in) twin-turbocharged M840T V8 engine found in the 720S. Having a new dedicated codename of M840TE, the new engine has smaller turbochargers that deliver lower peak performance than its Super Series variant but greater low RPM-performance and responsiveness. The GT has a rated power output of 620 PS (456 kW; 612 hp) at 7,000 rpm, and the maximum torque is 465 lb⋅ft (630 N⋅m) at 5,500 rpm.

=== Suspension ===
The suspension system in the GT is also derived from the system in the 720S. The car utilizes double wishbones at the front and rear axles, and a modified version of the ProActive Chassis Control II active damping system called Proactive Damping Control.

=== Performance ===
The company claims that the GT has a top speed of 326.7 km/h (203 mph), it can accelerate from 0–97 km/h (0–60 mph) in 3.1 seconds, and 0–200 km/h (0–124 mph) in 9 seconds.

=== Interior ===
The McLaren GT features 150 liters of storage space at the front and 420 liters in the rear, accommodating a full-sized set of golf clubs.

Napa leather is standard upholstery, but drivers can also choose from a softer hide made by Bridge of Weir Leather in Scotland or in the future, cashmere. The new comfort seats have increased shoulder padding and back support, with electrical adjustment and heating as standard on Pioneer and Luxe models. A 7-inch touchscreen mounted in the center controls a revamped infotainment system and is supplemented by a 12.3-inch driver information display which changes in layout depending on whether Comfort, Sport or Track mode is selected.

== GTS (2024–present) ==
McLaren GTS
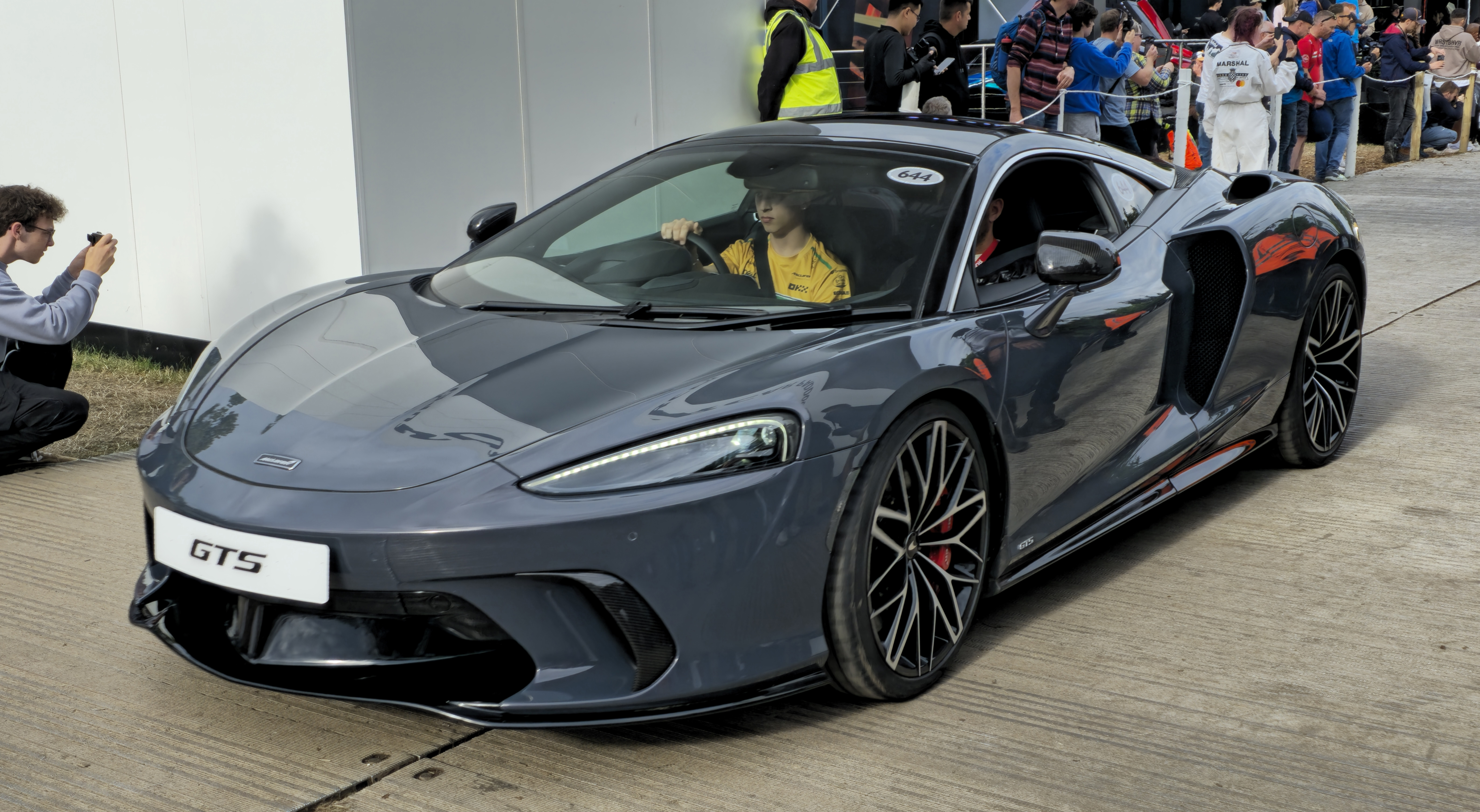

Overview
- Manufacturer: McLaren Automotive
- Production: 2024–present
- Assembly: United Kingdom: Woking, Surrey, England
- Designer: Alex Alexiev

Body and chassis
- Class: Grand tourer (S)
- Layout: Rear mid-engine, rear-wheel drive
- Platform: MonoCell II-T carbon-fibre monocoque
- Doors: Butterfly
- Related: McLaren 750S

Powertrain
- Engine: 4.0 L M840TE twin-turbocharged V8
- Power output: 635 PS (467 kW; 626 hp)
- Transmission: 7-speed dual-clutch

Dimensions
- Wheelbase: 2,675 mm (105.3 in)
- Length: 4,683 mm (184.4 in)
- Width: 2,095 mm (82.5 in)
- Height: 1,213 mm (47.8 in)
- Kerb weight: 1,520 kg (3,351 lb)

Chronology
- Predecessor: McLaren GT

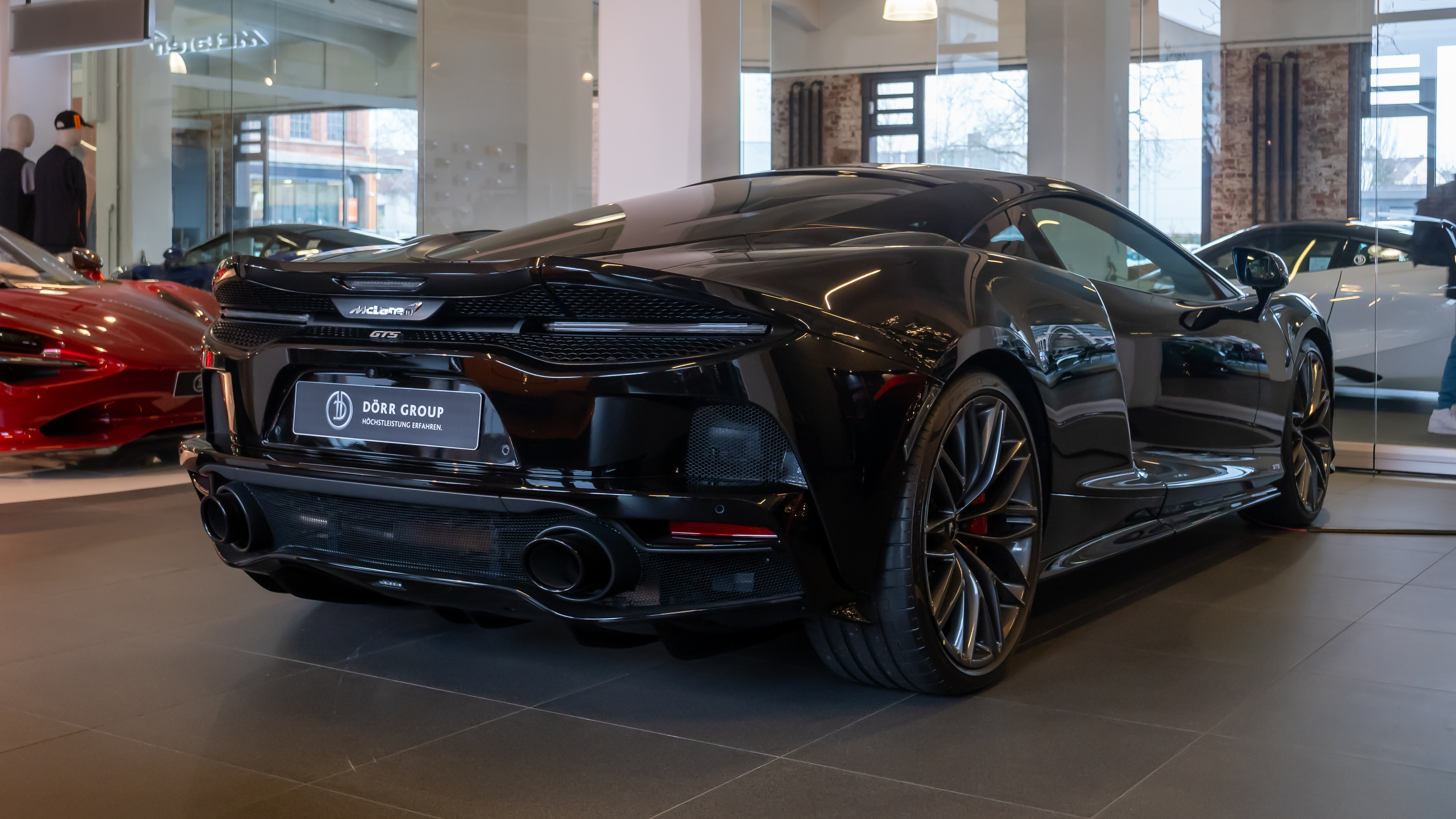
Rear view

In December 2023, McLaren announced the GTS as a successor to the GT, which is based on the same platform and comes with an updated design, reduced weight, and improved power output from the same 4 litre V8 turbocharged engine. The GTS arrived in dealerships in mid-2024.

=== Engine ===
The GTS has a rated power output of 635 PS (467 kW; 626 hp) at 7,500 rpm, and the maximum torque is 465 lb⋅ft (630 N⋅m) at 5,500-6,500 rpm.

=== Performance ===
The company claims that the GTS has a top speed of 326.7 km/h (203 mph), it can accelerate from 0–97 km/h (0–60 mph) in 3.1 seconds, and 0–200 km/h (0–124 mph) in 8.9 seconds.
