= McLaren Senna =

Sports car designed by McLaren Automotive

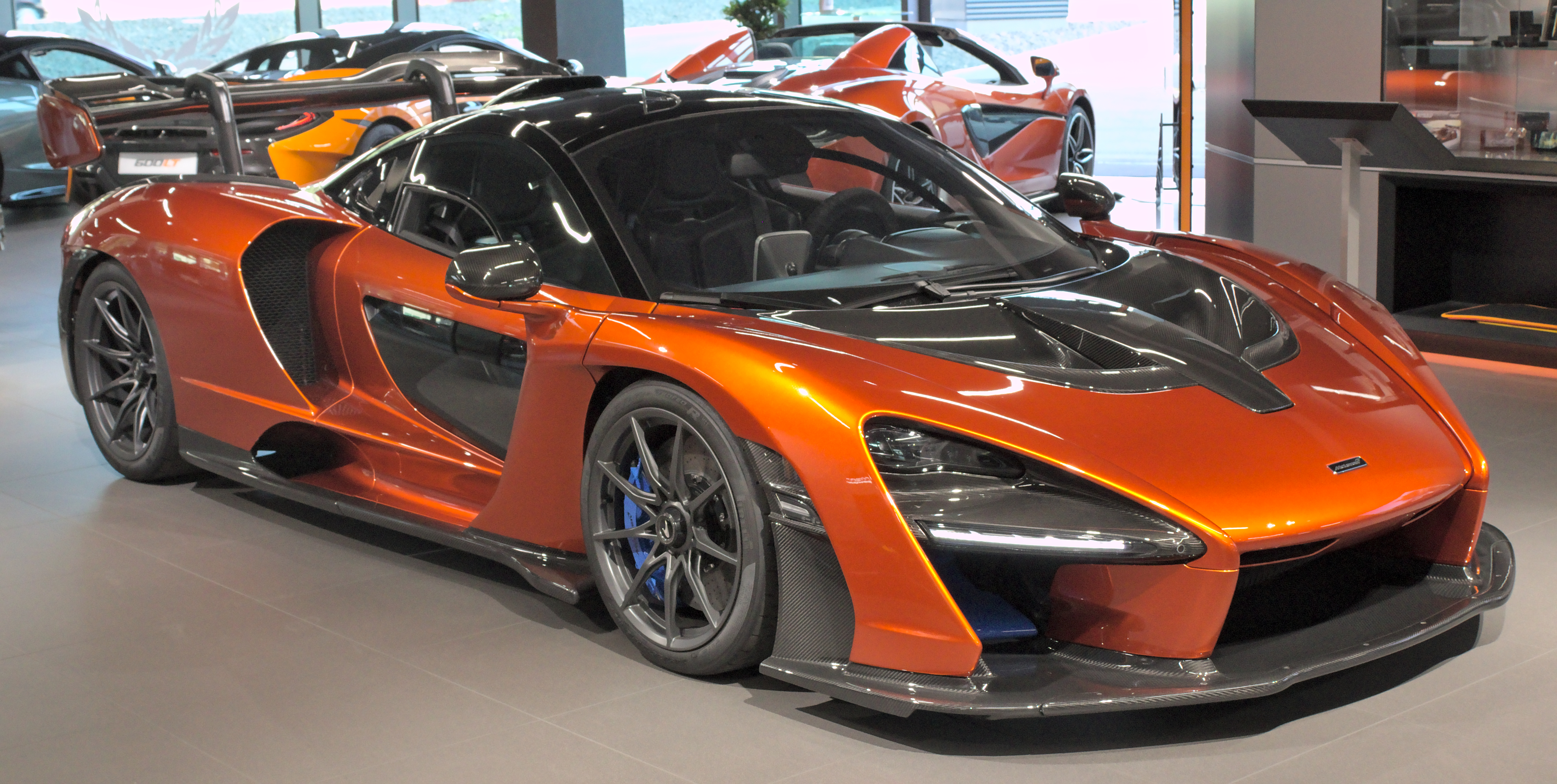

Overview
- Manufacturer: McLaren Automotive
- Also called: P15 (internal code)
- Production: 2018-2019; 500 Senna made 75 Senna GTR made 35 Senna LM made 5 Senna GTR LM made
- Model years: 2019-2020
- Assembly: United Kingdom: Woking, Surrey, England
- Designer: Rob Melville

Body and chassis
- Class: Sports Car (S)
- Body style: 2-door coupé
- Layout: Rear mid-engine, rear-wheel-drive
- Platform: MonoCage III carbon fiber monocoque
- Doors: Butterfly
- Related: McLaren 720S; McLaren Elva

Powertrain
- Engine: 4.0 L Ricardo-built and assembled McLaren M840TR twin-turbocharged V8
- Power output: 588 kW (799 PS; 789 hp); 800 N⋅m (590 lb⋅ft)
- Transmission: In-house 7-speed dual-clutch

Dimensions
- Wheelbase: 2,670 mm (105.1 in)
- Length: 4,744 mm (186.8 in)
- Width: 2,153 mm (84.8 in)
- Height: 1,195 mm (47.0 in)
- Kerb weight: 1,374 kg (3,029 lb)

The McLaren Senna is a limited-production mid-engined sports car manufactured by McLaren Automotive. The car is the third addition in the McLaren Ultimate Series, joining the F1 and the P1; however, it is not a direct successor to either of the cars. The Senna was unveiled online by the company on 10 December 2017, with the official unveiling taking place at the 2018 Geneva Motor Show.

== Name ==
The car is named after the Brazilian Formula One race driver Ayrton Senna (1960–1994), honouring and giving tribute to his success with the McLaren Formula One Team between 1988 and 1993 Formula 1 seasons. Senna won three Formula One World Drivers' Championship titles and thirty-five Formula One Grand Prix race wins with the team; McLaren also won four consecutive Formula One World Constructor's Championship titles with Senna as part of their driver line-up.

McLaren Automotive holds the rights to the Senna family name along with the Instituto Ayrton Senna. The organisation and McLaren have made the Senna name exclusive to the car, thereby prohibiting any other company from using the name.

== Specifications and performance ==
=== Exterior ===
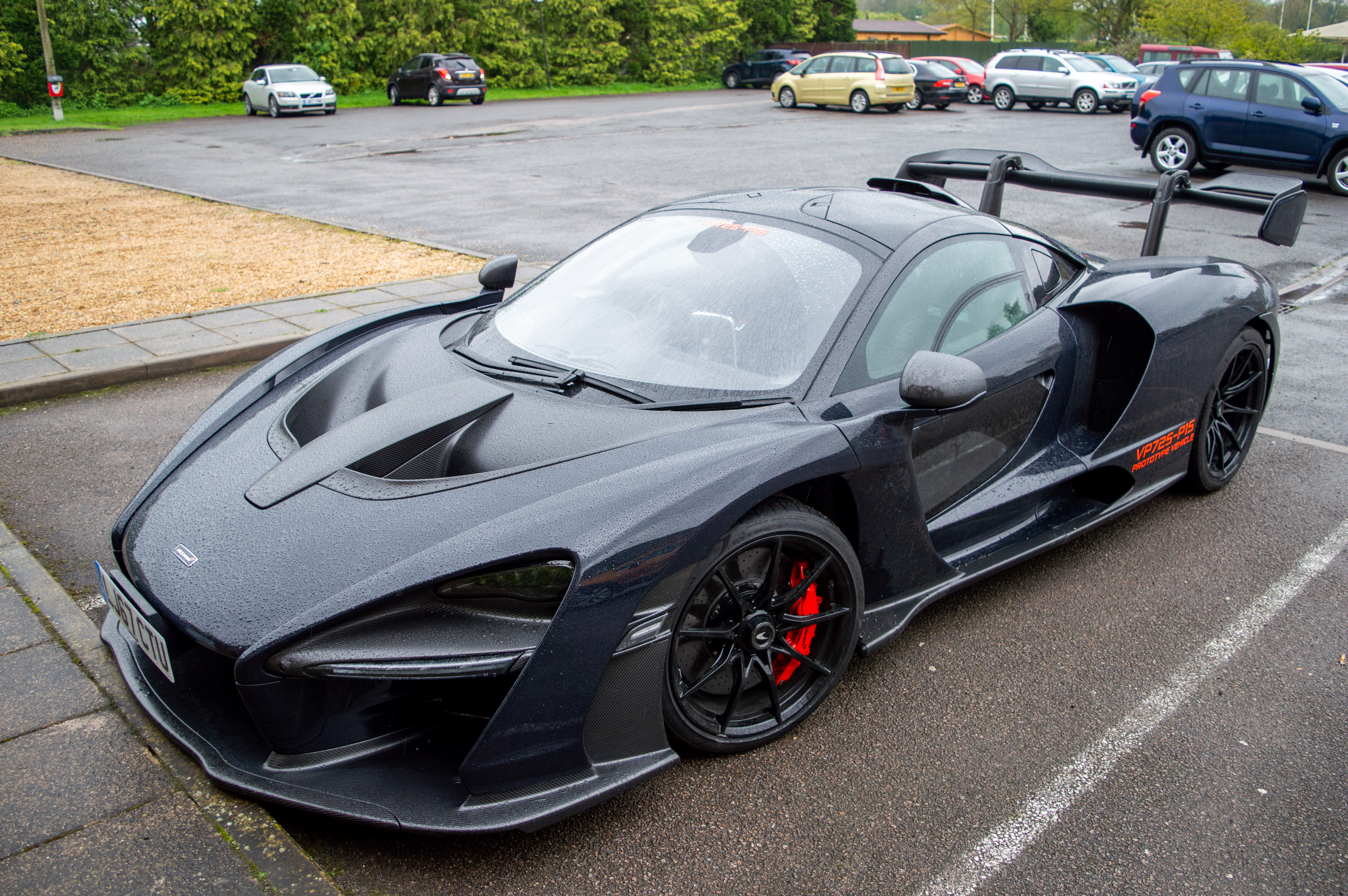
McLaren Senna Prototype front view

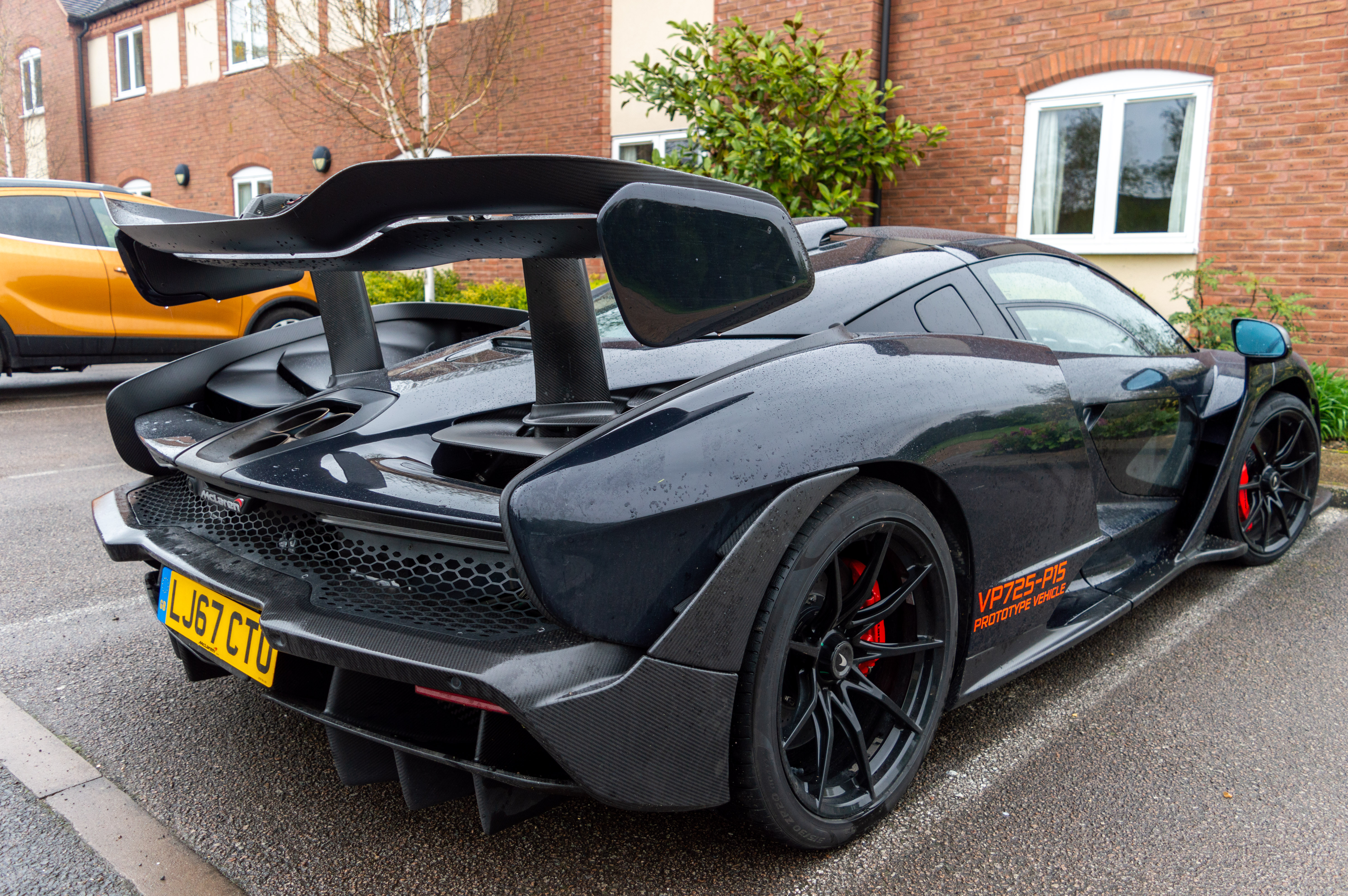
McLaren Senna Prototype rear view

McLaren's main focus while designing the Senna was to achieve faster lap times. In order to do so, McLaren developed a lightweight design that incorporated aerodynamic elements.

The Senna is largely based on the McLaren 720S, using a modified version of its carbon fibre monocoque and engine. The Senna is powered by a modified version of the McLaren 720S' 3,994 cc (4.0 L; 243.7 cu in) twin-turbocharged V8 engine codenamed the M840TR. It utilises a seven-speed dual-clutch transmission that delivers all 588 kW (799 PS; 789 hp) at 7,250 rpm and 800 N⋅m (590 lb⋅ft) of torque at 5,500 rpm to the rear wheels. Unlike the previous offering in the Ultimate Series, the McLaren P1, the Senna does not use an electric motor in favour of its low claimed dry weight of 1,198 kg (2,641 lb), which allows for a maximum power-to-weight ratio of 498 kW (677 PS; 668 hp) per ton.

The car has many aerodynamic elements, there being a large adjustable double-element rear wing (that is operated electronically and has various settings in order to provide optimum performance while also acting as an airbrake), double-element diffuser, Formula One-inspired roof scoop, front and side air intakes, rear air louvres, and large front fenders. Inside the panel beside the intakes is a small set of mini-canards. Areas of low pressure are accompanied using high-performance radiators that ensure improved engine cooling. The car uses dihedral doors, like the previous offerings in the Ultimate Series, and also has optional windows applied on the lower area of its doors.

The Senna uses a new generation of Brembo's carbon ceramic brakes, containing a compound that has three and a half times better thermal conductivity than before, making the brakes smaller and lighter. It also features a new set of lightweight center-lock alloy wheels designed for Pirelli P-Zero Trofeo R tyres. Its central design is a new generation of McLaren's carbon fibre monocoque named MonoCage III, which contributes to the car's relatively low dry weight. The car utilises a top mounted (hot-vee) inconel-titanium exhaust system with three outlet pipes in order for a more aggressive exhaust note and engine emissions.

=== Interior ===
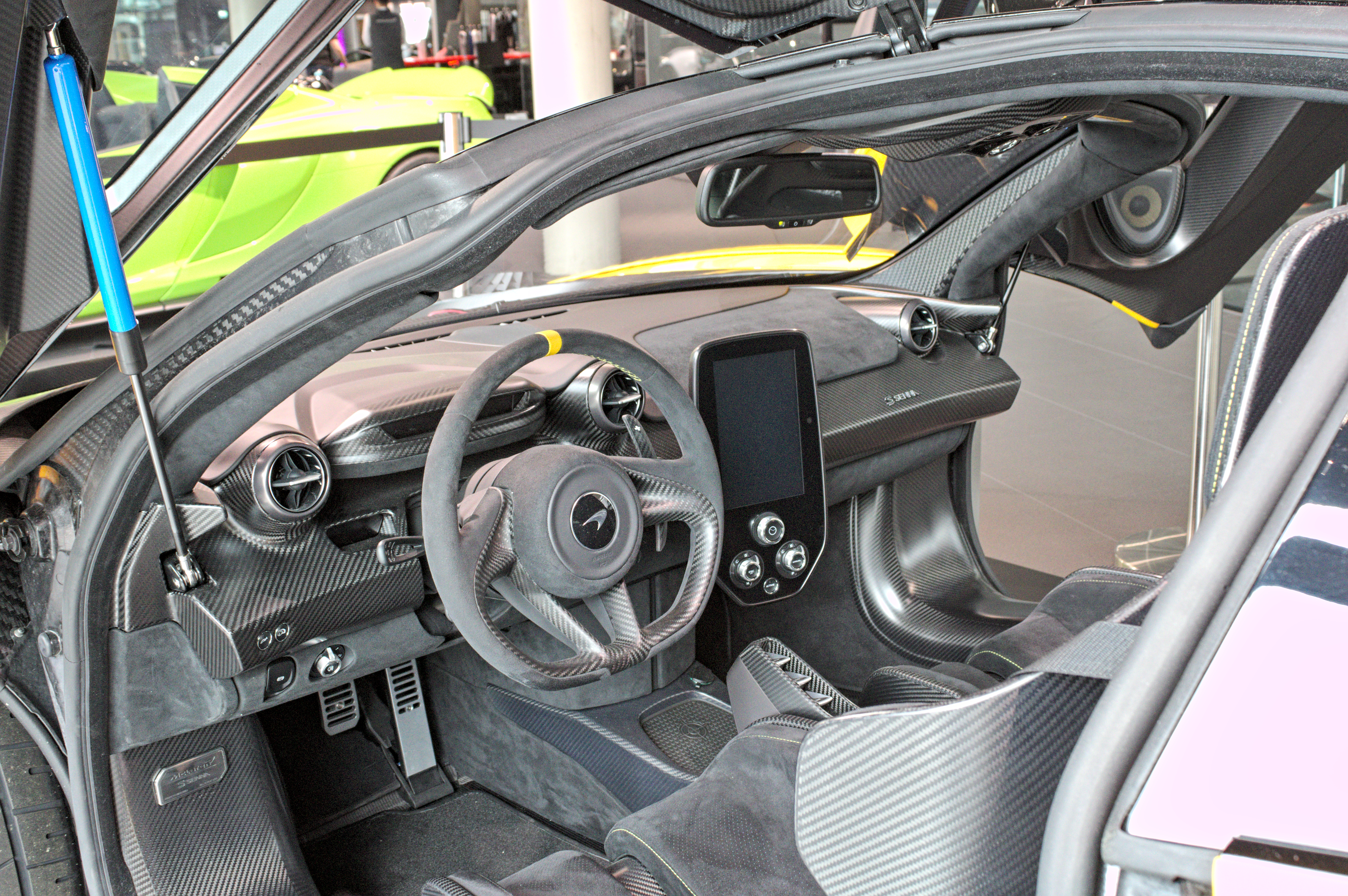
McLaren Senna interior

The interior consists largely of exposed carbon fibre and Alcantara, with seats that can be upholstered in Alcantara or leather, depending on the customer's preference. Behind the two seats is room large enough for two helmets and race suits, reflecting the car's minimalist and track focused design. The car utilises McLaren's hydraulic RaceActive Chassis Control II (RCC II) suspension along with double-wishbone control arms.

=== Performance statistics ===
(Manufacturer claimed figures)

In February 2018, McLaren released the full performance statistics of the track-oriented Senna model:

- 0–100 km/h (0–62 mph): 2.8 seconds
- 0–200 km/h (0–124 mph): 6.8 seconds
- 0–300 km/h (0–186 mph): 17.5 seconds
- Standing 1/4 mile (402 m): 9.9 seconds
- Power-to-weight ratio: 668 hp/tonne
- Top speed: 335 km/h (208 mph)

== Production ==
Every car was hand-built at the McLaren Production Centre in Woking, Surrey, England, with a production run of 500 units, all of which were sold. The McLaren Senna is listed at a price of £750,000 with the final car auctioned at a price of £1,916,793. Deliveries began in the third quarter of 2018.

== Senna GTR ==
At the 2018 Geneva Motor Show, McLaren unveiled the concept version of the track-only iteration of the Senna dubbed the Senna GTR. Although initially planned as the preview of McLaren's entry into the LM GTE class, LM P1-like costs and the performance of the F1 team prompted the company to cancel the GTE program and reveal the car for non-competitive track usage.

The production Senna GTR unveiled two years later has a different bodywork from the concept, with a different wing setup, toned-down aerodynamics, and utilizes a dual-clutch race transmission for faster gear shifts, a revised suspension system and Pirelli racing slicks in order to make it the fastest non-Formula One vehicle McLaren has ever created for faster lap times. The Senna GTR is estimated to produce at least 825 PS (607 kW; 814 hp) from its 4.0 L twin-turbocharged V8 engine and is meant to be faster and more agile than its road-going counterpart. On the exterior, the GTR utilizes wider front and rear fenders, a larger front splitter, new wheels and a bigger rear diffuser in order to make the car generate about 1,000 kg (2,204 lb) of downforce. The Senna GTR will be limited to 75 examples.

In reviewing the future regulations for the World Endurance Championship, the Fédération Internationale de l'Automobile (FIA) identified the Senna GTR as one of several models that fit their vision of a replacement for the Le Mans Prototype class. It was also a competitor at the 2019 Goodwood Festival of Speed.

=== Gallery ===
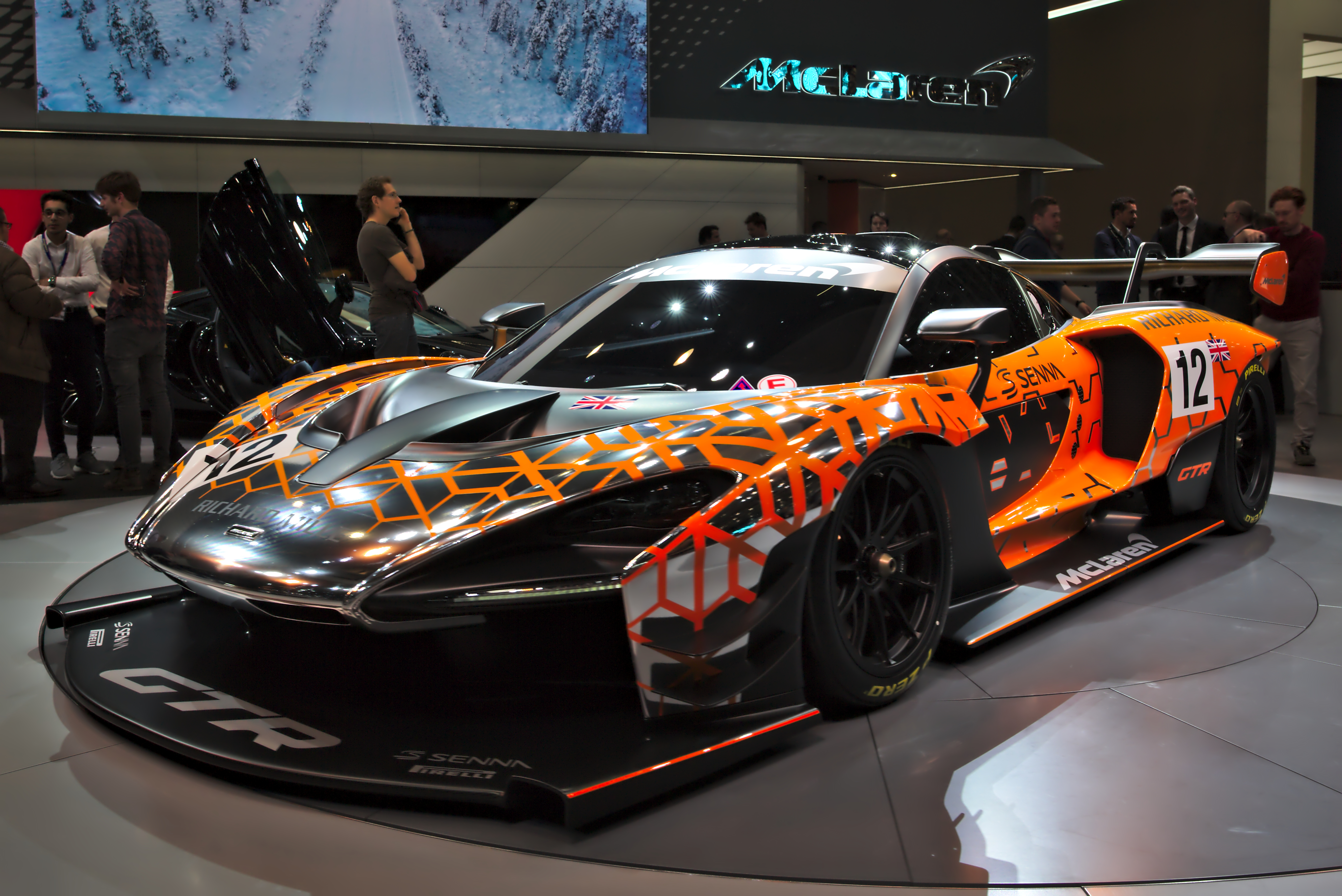
McLaren Senna GTR Concept

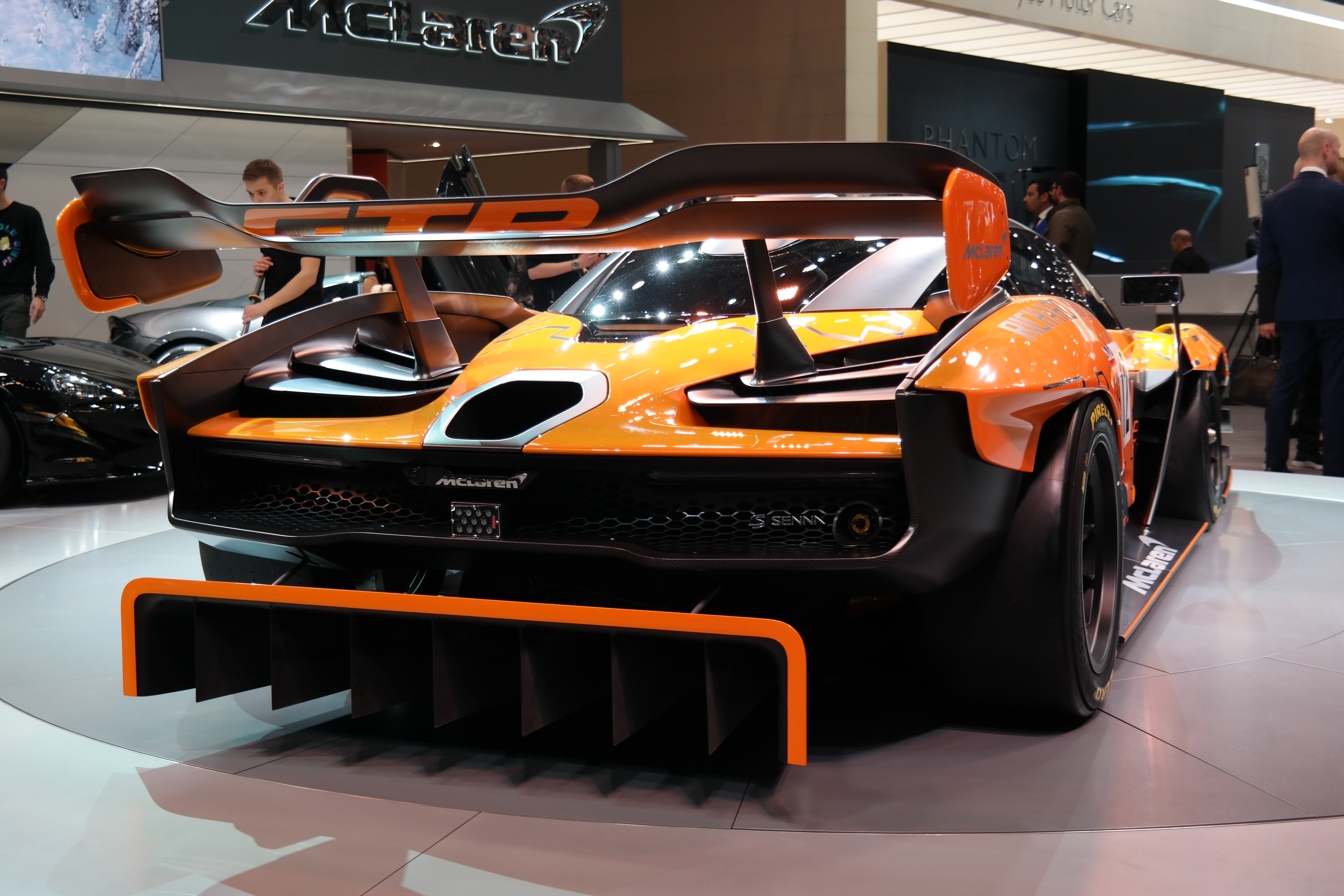
McLaren Senna GTR Concept (rear view)

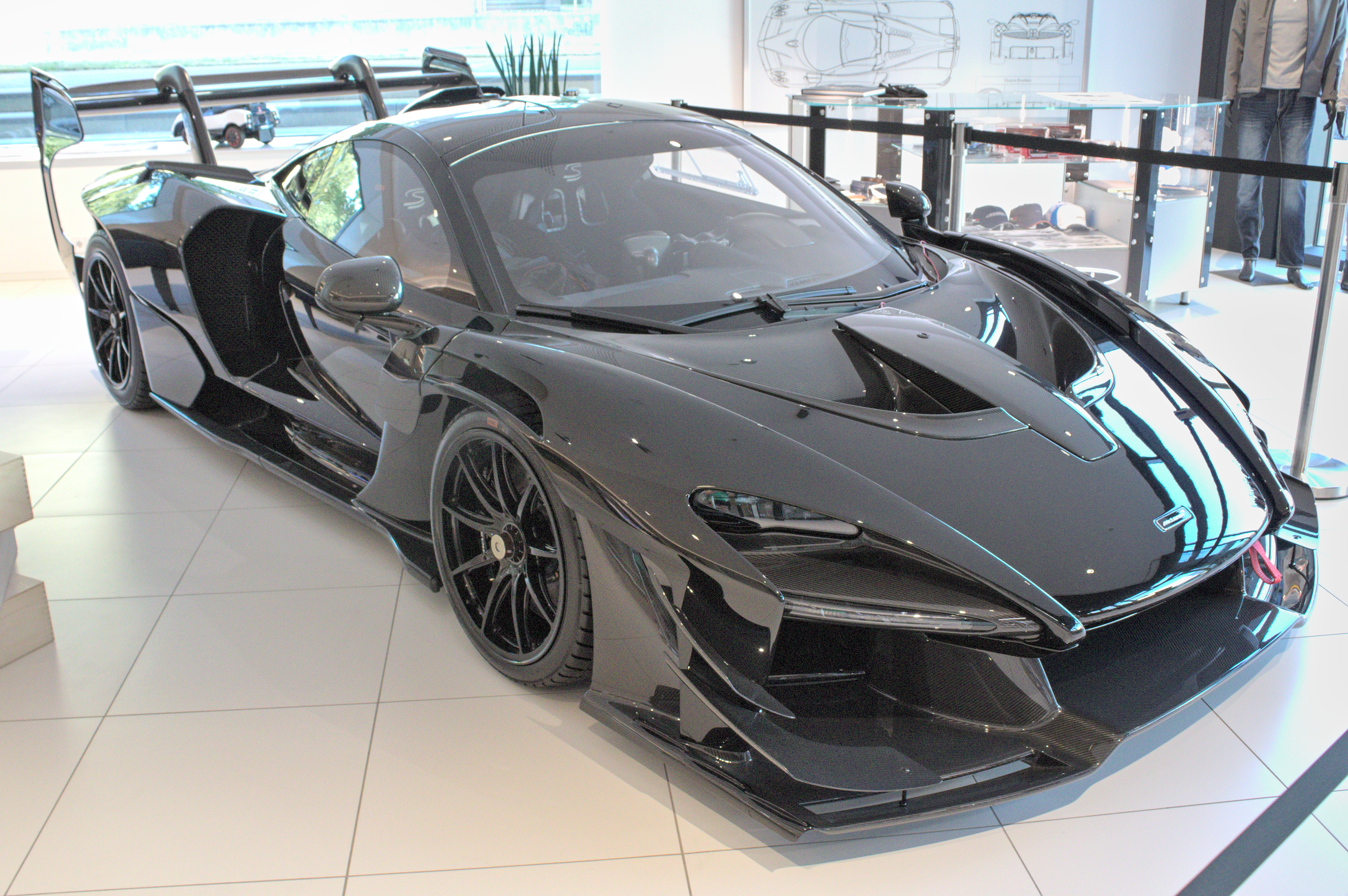
Senna GTR production version

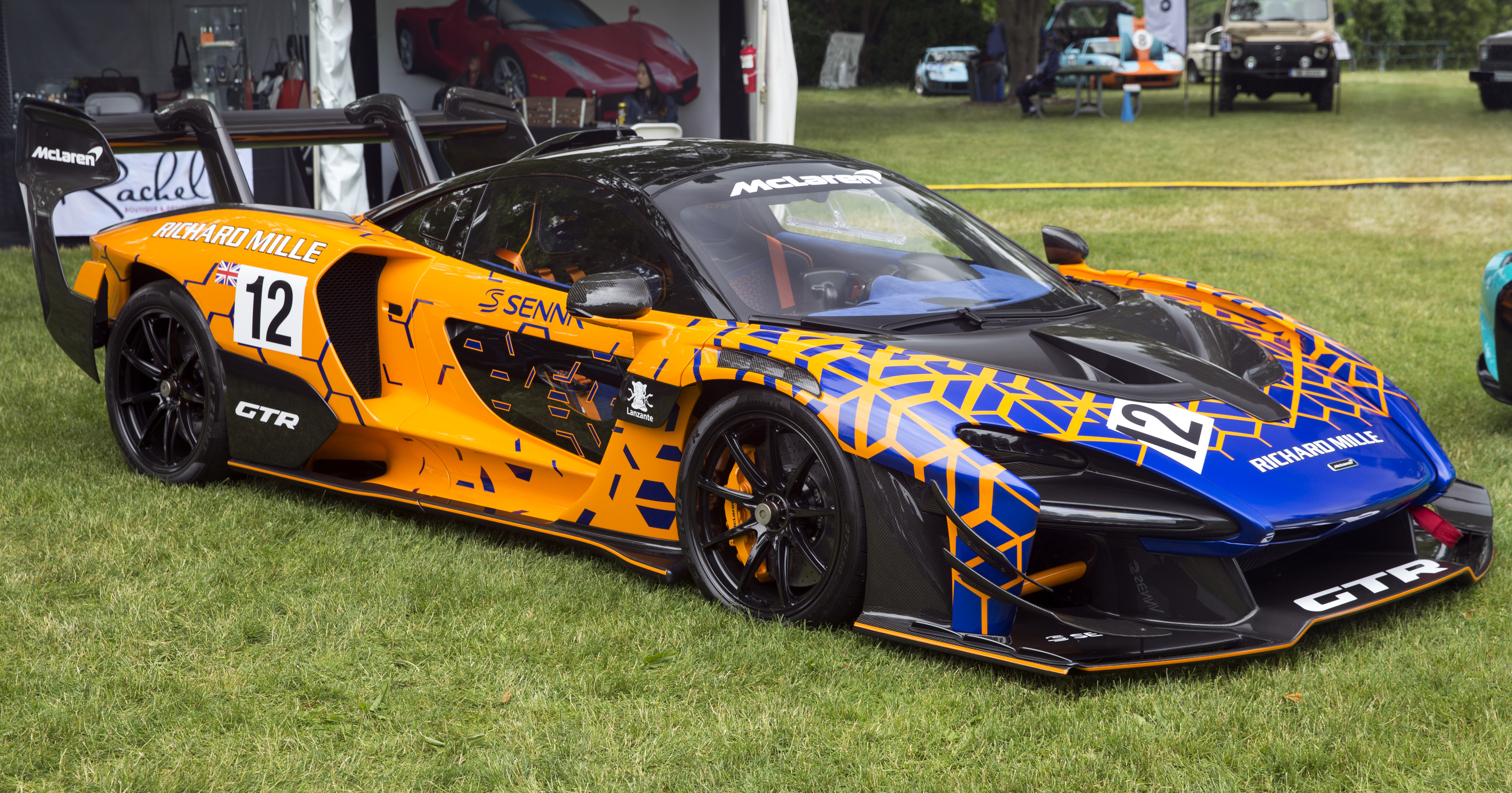
Road-legal McLaren Senna GTR (front view)

== Senna LM ==
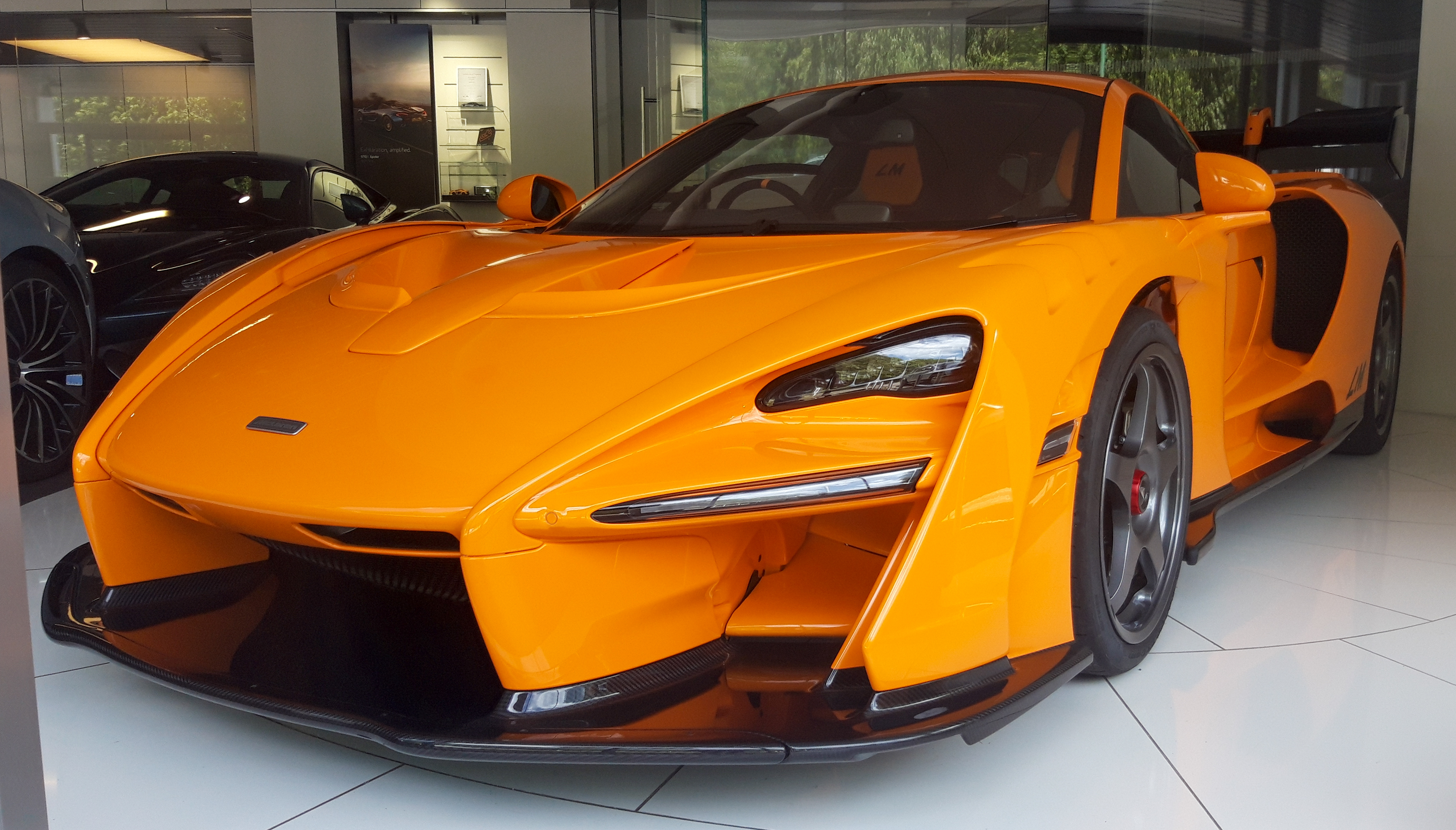
McLaren Senna LM

The Senna LM is a limited run of the Senna developed by the McLaren Special Operations department. The bodywork has unique changes including the front fender louvres and exhaust outlets. The McLaren orange livery is a homage to the McLaren F1 LM, which itself was made to celebrate the winning F1 GTR that won the 1995 24 Hours of Le Mans. The Senna LM also features polished ports and cylinder heads, OZ center-lock wheels with a retro design, satin-gold-tipped quad exhausts, louvers on the front fenders, the removal of the clear panel in the doors from the standard Senna, titanium panels and LM branding. Power of the 4-liter twin-turbo V8 is now up to 825 PS (607 kW; 814 hp), which matches the Senna GTR. A total of 35 units were produced, with 5 units sent to the US market and 7 right-hand drive units. All 5 US Senna LMs were delivered to the same person, a VIP client in Florida. That individual still owns 3 of the 5 US Senna LM, with the other two having been resold to other collectors. One of these models was destroyed in a road accident in 2020 by former Formula One driver Adrian Sutil, but was later fully repaired.

== Senna GTR LM ==
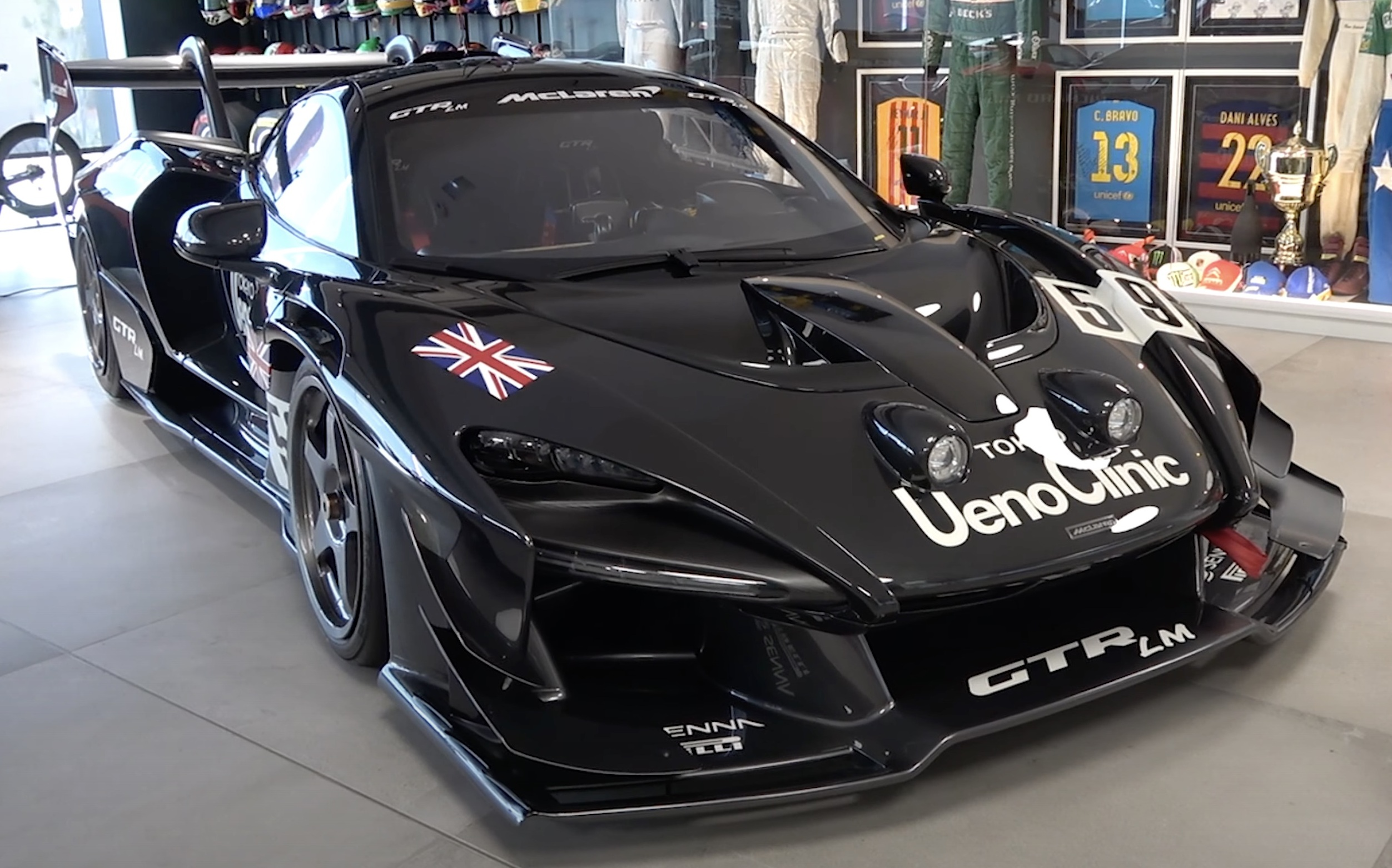
Senna GTR LM 825/1

McLaren, specifically its Special Operations department, officially unveiled the Senna GTR LM, the road-legal iteration of the track-only Senna GTR, online on September 17, 2020. It is not to be confused with the standard Senna LM. Five units have been made, and each has a unique paint scheme reflecting the five McLaren F1 GTRs at the 1995 24 Hours of Le Mans. All have been sold: two to a customer in the US, two to a customer in Spain, and one to a customer in the United Kingdom. The cars were made to celebrate the 25th anniversary of McLaren's win at LeMans. They feature OZ Racing carbon fiber wheels and have the same bodywork as the Senna GTR. Power has been increased to 833 hp (621 kW; 845 PS), higher than any other Senna variant to date. Power is 20 PS more than a base Senna GTR. The redline is also increased from 8250 rpm up to 9000 rpm.

== Sabre ==
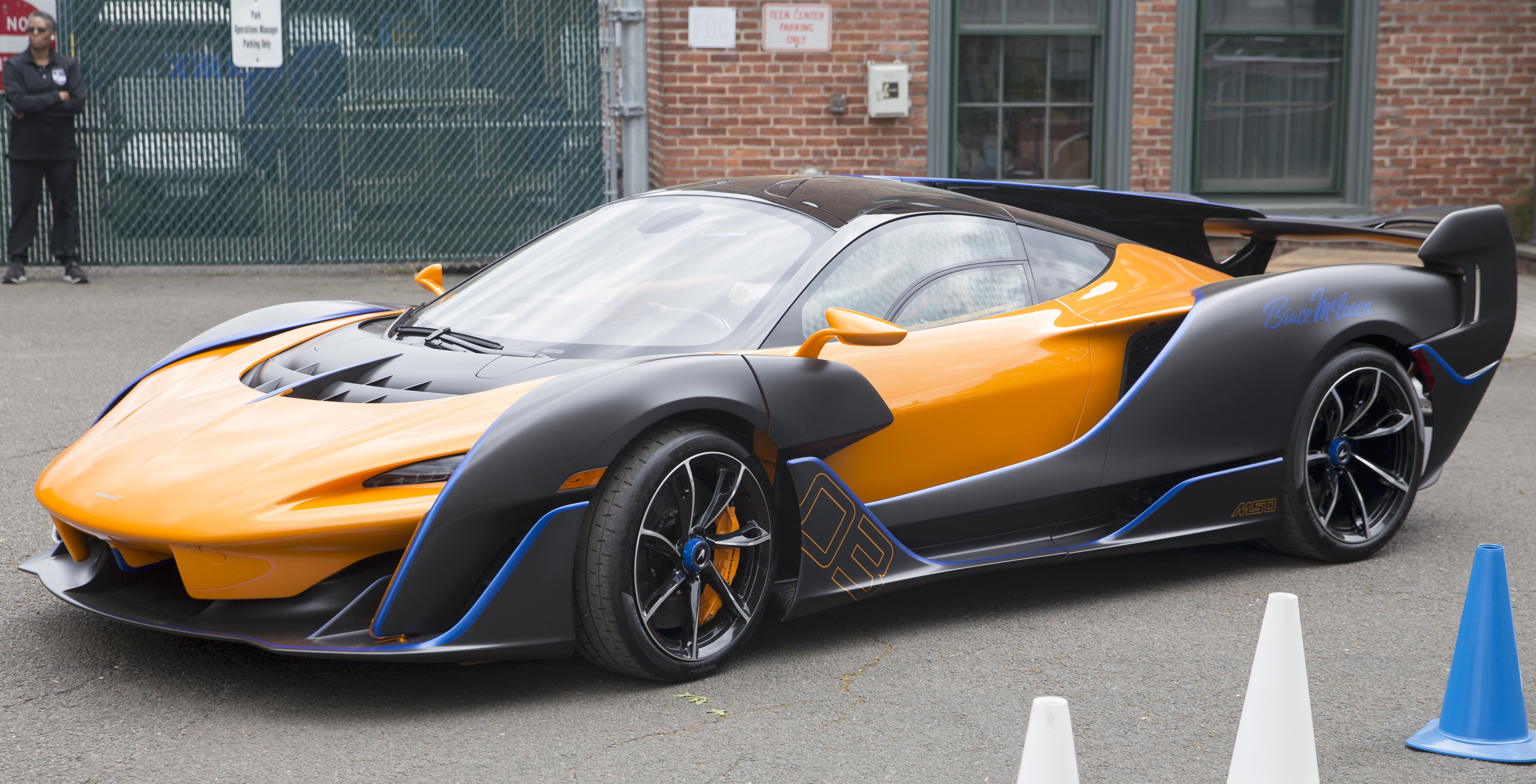
Front view of a Sabre

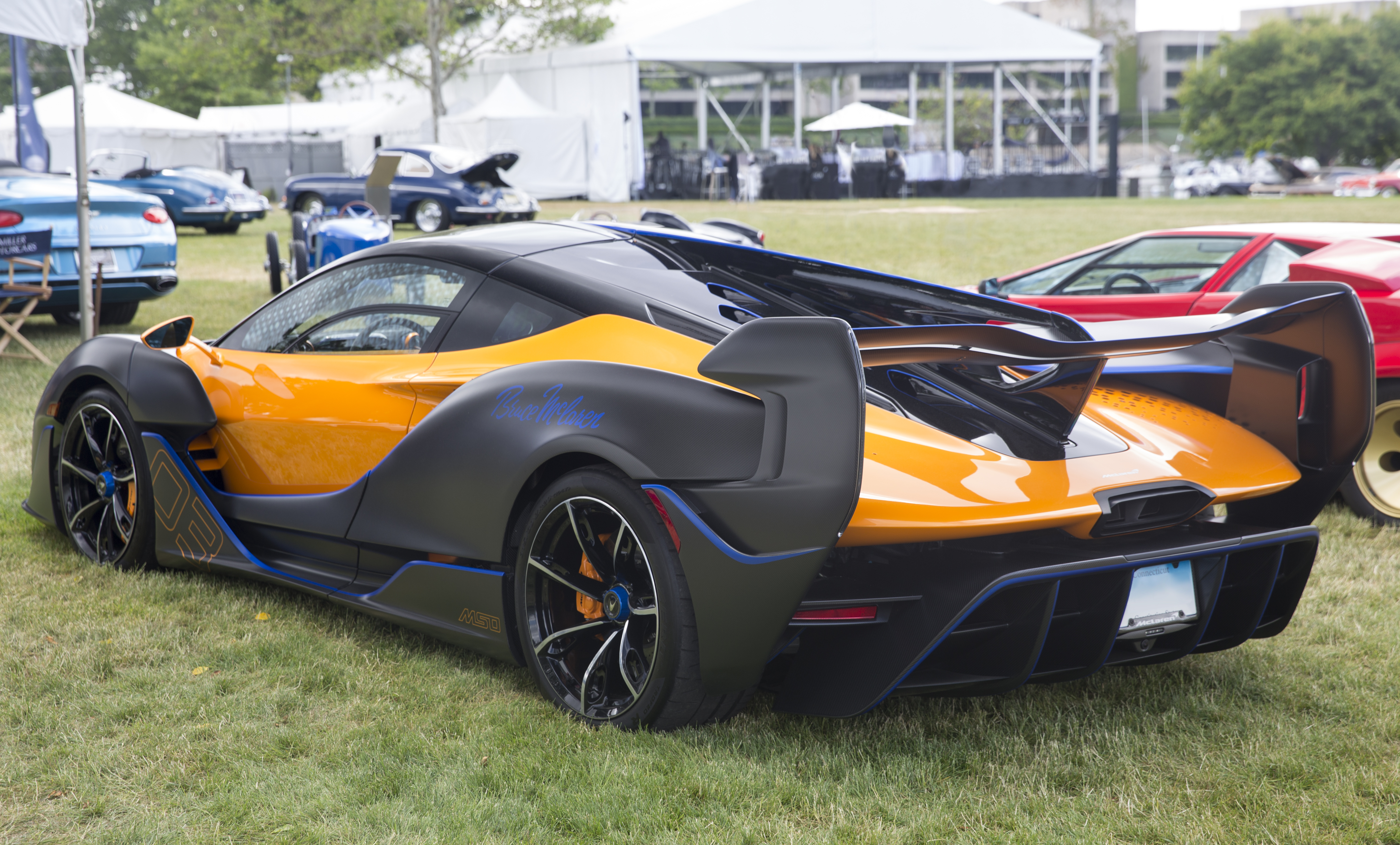
Rear view of a 2020 Sabre no. 03

In December 2020, McLaren unveiled the Sabre, a model claimed to be exclusively made for the US market, with design inspirations heavily stemming from the McLaren Ultimate Vision Gran Turismo, while borrowing a few key aerodynamic elements from the Senna. The car was developed by McLaren Special Operations (MSO) and 15 cars were produced.

The twin-turbocharged 4.0-litre V8 engine is now rated at 824 hp (614 kW; 835 PS) and the car's top speed is 218 mph (351 km/h), 24 hp (18 kW) and 7 mph (11 km/h) more than a base Senna. McLaren claims the Sabre to be the fastest two-seat McLaren when it came out as the McLaren F1 and McLaren Speedtail both have three seats.
