= Arash (name) =

Arash or Arash the Archer (Persian: آرش کمانگیر Āraš-e Kamāngīr) is a heroic archer-figure of Iranian mythology.

Arash is also a common Iranian first name. Variants include Aarash, Aurash, Erash, Eruch, or Erexsha). Notable persons with the name include:

== Given name ==
Arts and entertainment

- Arash (singer) (born 1977), real name Arash Labaf, Iranian-Swedish singer
- Arash Estilaf, known as Hua Bobo in China, Iranian actor and TV host active in China
- Arash Hejazi (born 1971), Iranian novelist
- Arash Howaida, Afghani singer, son of popular Afghan musician Zahir Howaida
- Arash Karimi (born 1977), Iranian photographer known for his documentary photos
- Arash "AJ" Maddah, Australian music promoter, founder of Soundwave and Harvest Music Festival
- Arash Pournouri (born 1981), Iranian-Swedish record manager, record producer, songwriter and record executive

Business and economy

- Arash Asli, Canadian businessman, founder of Yocale
- Arash Farboud, founder of Arash Motor Company
- Arash Ferdowsi (born 1985), co-founder of Dropbox
- Arash Vafadari, Iranian businessman

Sports

- Arash Afshin (born 1990), Iranian footballer
- Arash Bayat (born 1983), Iranian-Swedish footballer
- Arash Borhani (born 1983), Iranian footballer
- Arash Dajliri (born 1999), Iranian footballer
- Arash Gholizadeh (born 1990), Iranian footballer
- Arash Kamalvand (born 1989), Iranian volleyball player
- Arash Keshavarzi (born 1987), Iranian volleyball player
- Arash Markazi (born 1980), Iranian-American sports journalist
- Arash Miresmaeili (born 1981), Iranian Judo champion
- Arash Noamouz (born 1967), Iranian footballer
- Arash Ostovari (born 1992), Iranian footballer
- Arash Rezavand (born 1993), Iranian footballer
- Arash Shahamati (born 1998), Iranian footballer
- Arash Soosarian (born 1986), Iranian footballer
- Arash Talebinejad (born 1981), Iranian-Swedish footballer
- Arash Usmanee (born 1982), Afghan-Canadian boxer

Others

- Arash Abizadeh, Iranian-Canadian philosopher and professor
- Arash Sadeghi, Iranian political activist
- Arash Rahmanipour (1990-2010), Iranian man hung by the Iranian government
- Sayyid Arash Hosseini Milani, Iranian politician
- Seyed Arash Bagheri, Iranian English teacher

== Surname ==
- Tawab Arash (born 1976), Afghan singer
- Ivan Bultinovich Kitanov a.k.a. Gavang Arash (1858–1926), Buddhist priest of Kalmykia
