= Arash (disambiguation) =

Arash is a mythological archer in Iranian legend and folklore

Arash may also refer to:

- Arash (name), a common Iranian name, including people with that name
- Arash Mahal, a city in Azerbaijan now named Agdash
- Arash Motor Company, a sports car manufacturer based in England.
- Arash (Tanzanian ward), a ward in Tanzania
- Arash (sniper rifle), a rifle developed by Iran
- Arash (singer) (born 1977), Iranian-Swedish singer, entertainer and producer
  - Arash (album), 2005
- Arash (radar), an Iranian radar system
- Arash (rocket), an Iranian artillery rocket
- Arash gas field, Iranian natural gas field
- Arash Sultanate, a feudal fiefdom that existed between 1747 and 1795 in Transcaucasus
