= Aslı =

- Gender: Female
- Language: Turkish

Origin
- Meaning: original, ace, genuine

Other names
- See also: Aslıhan, Nesli, Neslihan

Asli is a mostly Turkish female given namewhich derives from the Arabic word āsīl (Arabic: اصیل) whose meanings include genuine, authentic, and pure. It is used as a nickname for the heroine in the 16th-century Turkic tale "Kerem ile Aslı" after the hero asks her ""Why do you want me to leave you? What is the essence of your wish?” (“Aslı” means “essence”).

== Given name ==
=== First name ===
- Aslı Bayram (born 1981), German actress and model of Turkish descent
- Aslı Bekiroğlu (born 1995), Turkish actress
- Aslı Canan Sabırlı (born 1991), Turkish women's footballer
- Aslı Çakır Alptekin (born 1985), Turkish Olympic gold medalist middle distance runner
- Aslı Demir (born 1999), Turkish freestyle wrestler
- Aslı Duman (born 1992), Turkish water polo player
- Aslı Enver (born 1984), Turkish actress
- Aslı Erdoğan (born 1967), Turkish writer
- Aslı Gökyokuş (born 1977), Turkish singer
- Aslı Güngör (born 1979), Turkish pop singer
- Aslı İskit (born 1993), Turkish handball player
- Aslı Kalaç (born 1995), Turkish volleyball player
- Aslı Melisa Uzun (born 1995), Turkish actress and beauty pageant titleholder
- Aslı Perker (born 1975), Turkish journalist
- Aslı Tandoğan (born 1979), Turkish actress

=== Middle name ===
- Ceyda Aslı Kılıçkıran (born 1968), Turkish screenwriter and film director
- Melisa Aslı Pamuk (born 1991), Dutch-Turkish beauty pageant titleholder
