= Asli =

Asli may refer to:

- Orang Asli, the indigenous people in Malaysia
- Aslı, a Turkish female given name
- Asli (surname)
- Asli Demirguc-Kunt (born 1961), Turkish economist
- Asli Hassan Abade, Somali pilot
