= Ceyda =

- Gender: Female
- Language: Turkish

Origin
- Origin: Arabic

Ceyda is a Turkish female given name.

== Given name ==
- Ceyda Aktaş (born 1994), Turkish volleyball player
- Ceyda Ateş (born 1988), Turkish actor
- Ceyda Aslı Kılıçkıran (born 1968), Turkish screenwriter and film director
- Ceyda Kozluca (born 1984), Turkish basketball player
- Ceyda Sungur (born 1986), Turkish academician and activist.
