= Aslıhan =

- Gender: Female

Origin
- Origin: Turkish
- Meaning: 'noble', 'original'
- Region of origin: Turkey

Other names
- Related names: Aslı, Nesli, Neslihan

Aslıhan is a Turkish female given name, derived from names Aslı (“genuine”, “authentic”, “the essence”) and Han (“ruler”, “leader”, lit. “khan”). It means 'from khan family' or shortly 'noble'.

== Given name ==
- Aslıhan Güner (born 1984), Turkish actress
- Aslıhan Gürbüz (born 1983), Turkish actress
- Aslıhan Koruyan Sabancı (born 1972), Turkish chef
- Aslıhan Malbora (born 1995), Turkish actress
- Aslıhan Ünaldı, Turkish cinema screenwriter
- K. Aslıhan Yener (born 1946), Turkish archaeologist

== Other uses ==
Aslıhan is also a place connected to the Altıeylül district of Balıkesir province, Turkey.

== See also ==
- Aslı
- Neslihan
