= Mid-engine design =

Automobile design in which the engine is placed between the front and rear axles

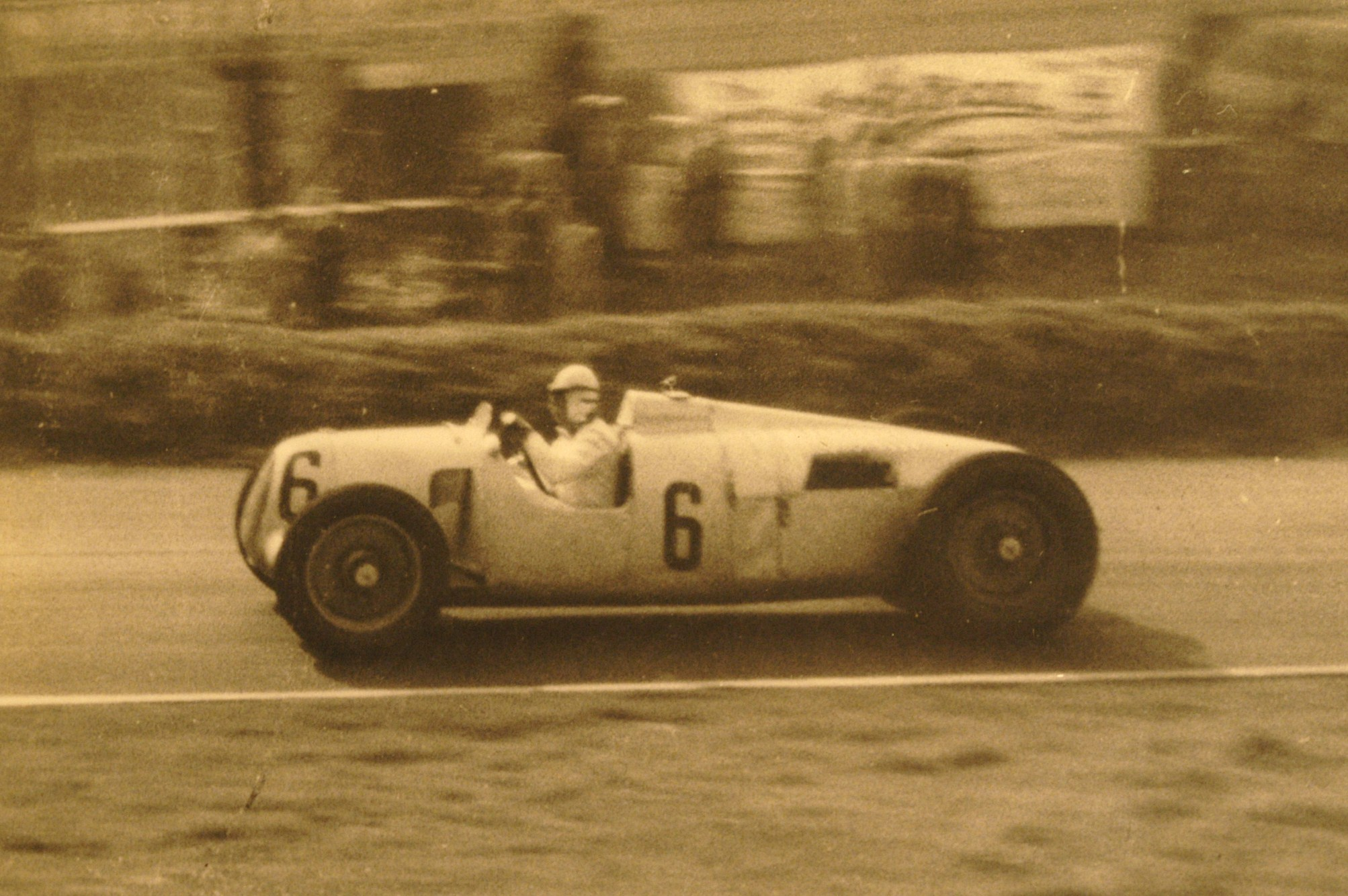
Auto Union Typ C rear-mid engine rear-wheel-drive Grand Prix racing car, 1937

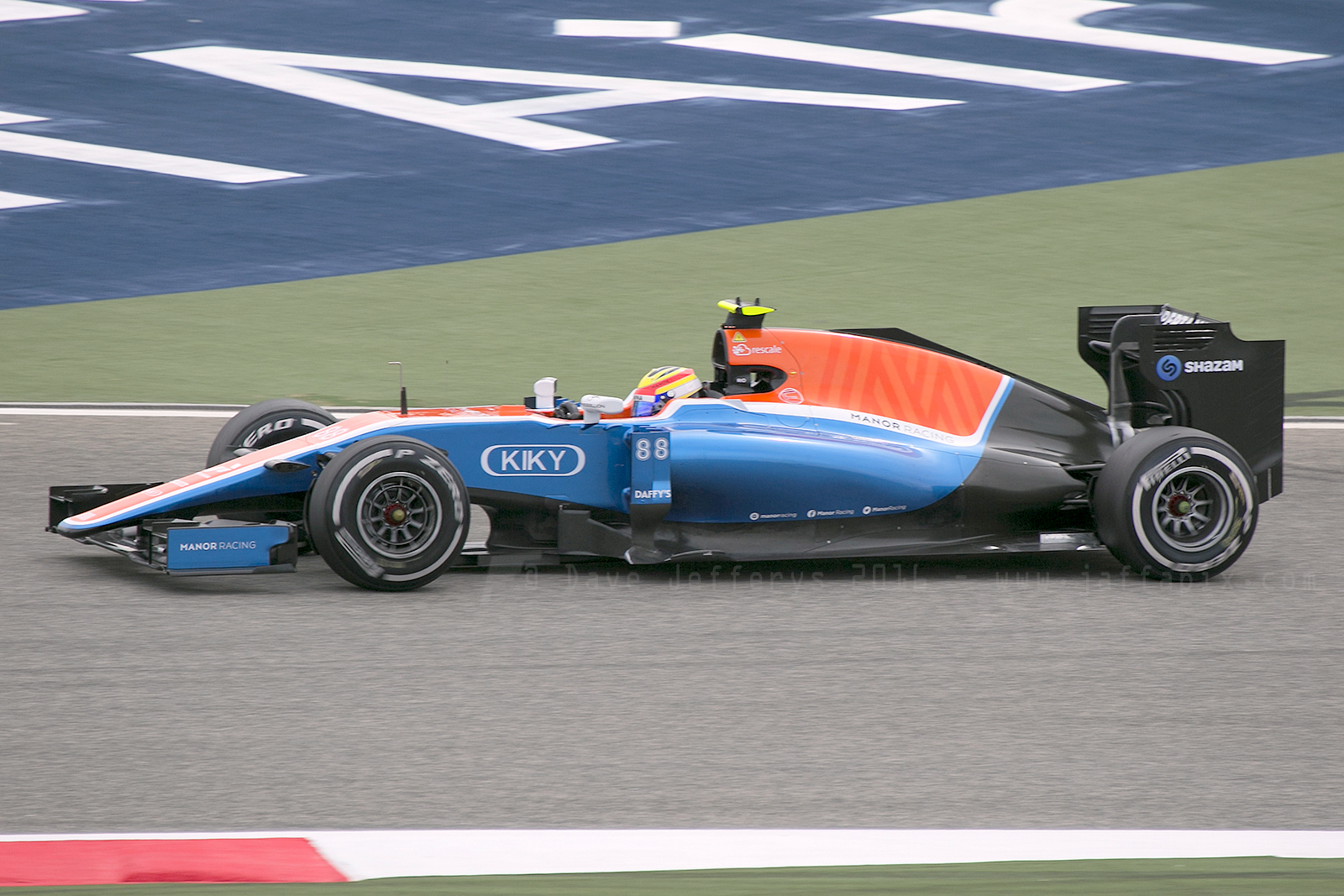
Since 1961 all Formula One cars use rear-mid engine rear-wheel-drive design

In automotive engineering, a mid-engine layout is the placement of an automobile combustion engine between the front and rear axles rather than on an axle (between the front wheels in most cars) or even beyond one, like in the rear-engine Porsche 911. In addition, "mid-engine" is often used as synonym to "engine behind the driver compartment", even though a mid-engine can be in front of the driver.

== History ==
The mid-engine, rear-wheel-drive format can be considered the original layout of automobiles as both Daimler and Benz used this layout in their 1880s vehicles. A 1901 Autocar was the first gasoline-powered automobile to use a drive shaft and place the engine under the seat. This pioneering vehicle is now in the collection of the Smithsonian Institution.

== Benefits ==
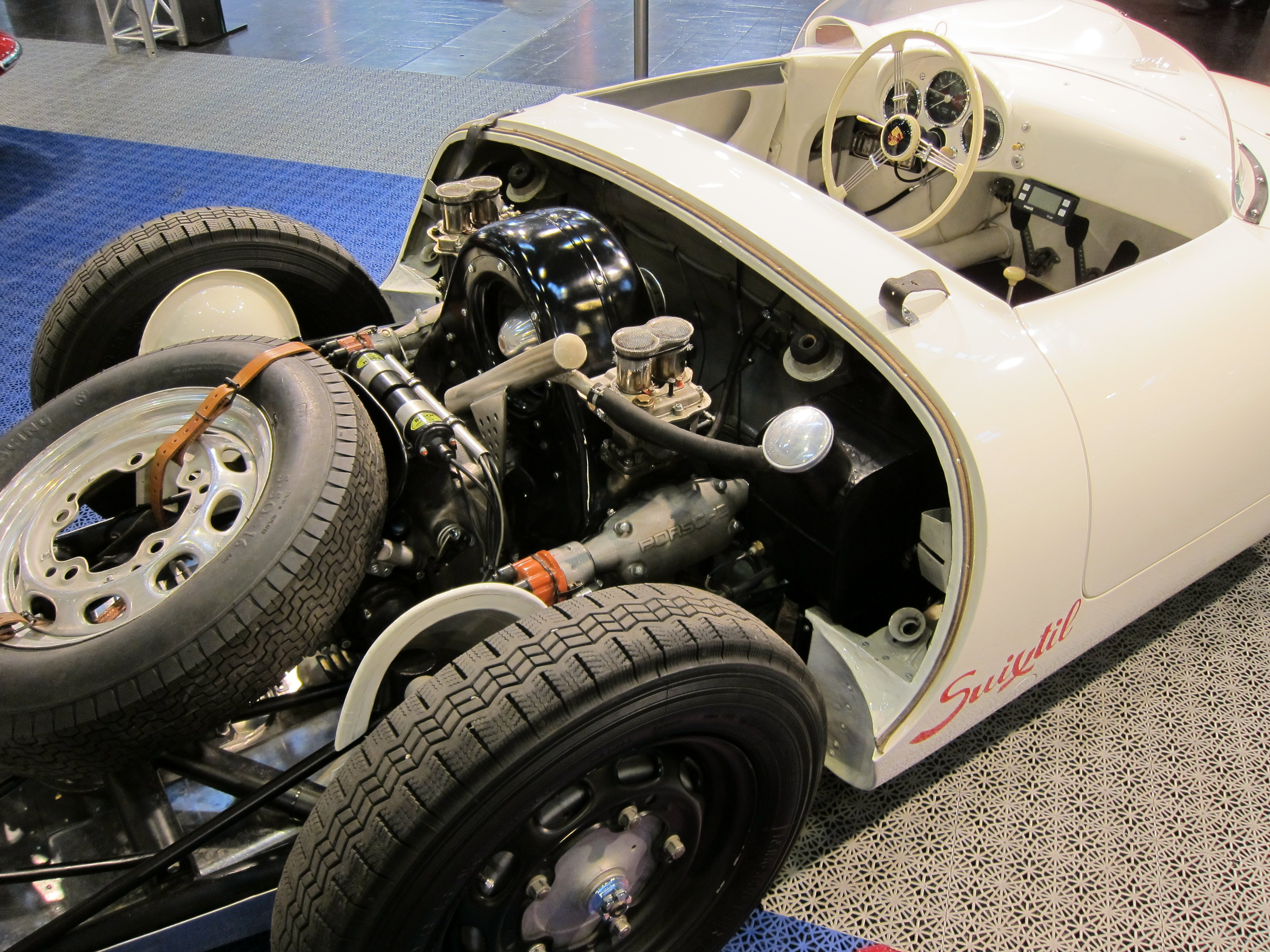
Very short Porsche 547 flat-4 mid-engine in a 1950s Porsche 550 two-seat sports car

Mounting the engine in the middle instead of the front of the vehicle puts more weight over the rear tires, so they have more traction and provide more assistance to the front tires in braking the vehicle, with less chance of rear-wheel lockup and less chance of a skid or spin out. If the mid-engine vehicle is also rear-drive the added weight on the rear tires can also improve acceleration on slippery surfaces, providing much of the benefit of all-wheel drive without the added weight and expense of all-wheel-drive components. The mid-engine layout makes ABS brakes and traction control systems work better, by providing them more traction to control. Mid-engine design is also a way to provide additional empty crush space in the front of the automobile between the bumper and the windshield, which can then be designed to absorb more of the impact force in a frontal collision in order to minimize penetration into the passenger compartment of the vehicle.

In most automobiles, and in sports cars especially, ideal car handling requires balanced traction between the front and rear wheels when cornering, in order to maximize the possible speed around curves without sliding out. This balance is harder to achieve when the heavy weight of the engine is located far to the front or far to the rear of the vehicle. Some automobile designs strive to balance the fore and aft weight distribution by other means, such as putting the engine in the front and the gearbox and battery in the rear of the vehicle.

Another benefit comes when the heavy mass of the engine is located close to the back of the seats. It makes it easier for the suspension to absorb the force of bumps so the riders feel a smoother ride. But in sports cars, the engine position is once again used to increase performance and the potentially smoother ride is usually more than offset by stiffer shock absorbers.

This layout also allows the motor, gearbox, and differential to be bolted together as a single unit. Together with independent suspension on the driven wheels, this removes the need for the chassis to transfer engine torque reaction.

== Drawbacks ==
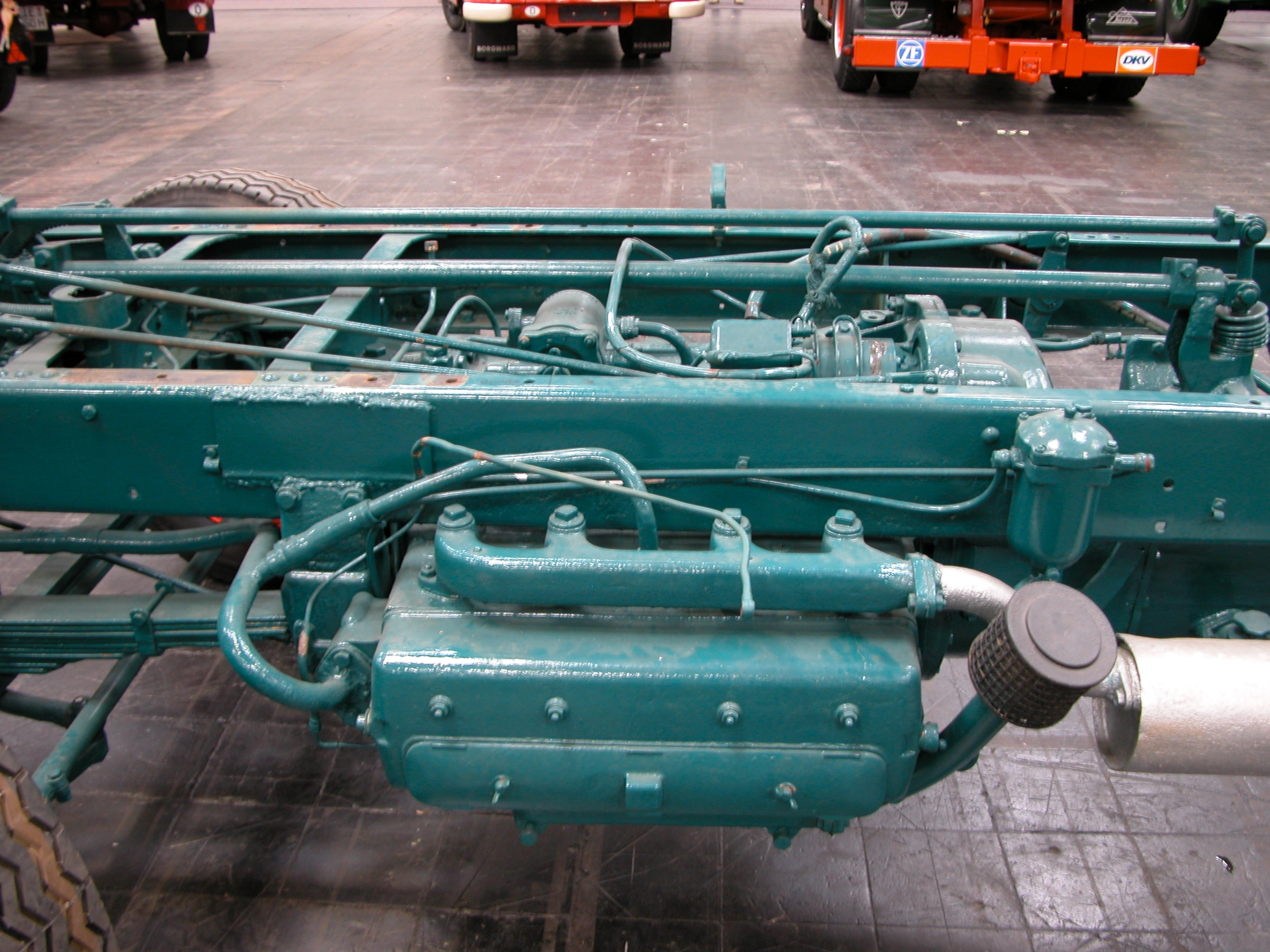
Underfloor mid-engine in a historical Hanomag truck chassis

The largest drawback of mid-engine cars is restricted rear or front (in the case of front-mid layouts) passenger space; consequently, most mid-engine vehicles are two-seat vehicles. The engine in effect pushes the rear passenger seats forward towards the front axle (if the engine is behind the driver). Exceptions typically involve larger vehicles of unusual length or height in which the passengers can share space between the axles with the engine, which can be between them or below them, as in some vans, large trucks, and buses. The mid-engine layout (with a horizontal engine) was common in single-decker buses in the 1950s and 1960s, e.g. the AEC Reliance. The Ferrari Mondial is to date the only successful example of a true mid-engined convertible with seating for 4 and sports car/supercar performance. A version of the Lotus Evora with a removable roof panel is anticipated but no definite date is known.

Like any layout where the engine is not front-mounted and facing the wind, the traditional "engine-behind-the-passengers" layout makes engine cooling more difficult. This has been a problem in some cars, but this issue seems to have been largely solved in newer designs. For example, the Saleen S7 employs large engine-compartment vents on the sides and rear of the bodywork to help dissipate heat from its very high-output engine.

Mid-engined cars are more dangerous than front-engined cars if the driver loses control – although this may be initially harder to provoke due to the superior balance – and the car begins to spin. The moment of inertia about the center of gravity is low due to the concentration of mass between the axles (similar to standing in the middle of a playground roundabout, rather than at the edge) and the spin will occur suddenly, the car will rotate faster and it will be harder to recover from. Conversely, a front-engined car is more likely to break away in a progressive and controllable manner as the tires lose traction.

== Variations ==
Super, sport, and race cars frequently have a mid-engined layout, as these vehicles' handling characteristics are more important than other requirements, such as usable space. In dedicated sports cars, a weight distribution of about 50% front and rear is frequently pursued, to optimise the vehicle's driving dynamics – a target that is typically only achievable by placing the engine somewhere between the front and rear axles. Usually, the term "mid-engine" has been primarily applied to cars having the engine located between the driver and the rear drive axles. This layout is referred to as rear mid-engine, rear-wheel drive, (or RMR) layout. The mechanical layout and packaging of an RMR car are substantially different from that of a front-engine or rear-engine car.

When the engine is in front of the driver, but fully behind the front axle line, the layout is sometimes called a front mid-engine, rear-wheel-drive, or FMR layout instead of the less-specific term front-engine; and can be considered a subset of the latter. In-vehicle layout, FMR is substantially the same as FR, but handling differs as a result of the difference in weight distribution.

Some vehicles could be classified as FR or FMR depending on the factory-installed engine (I4 vs I6). Historically most classical FR cars such as the Ford Models T and A would qualify as an FMR engine car. Additionally, the distinction between FR and FMR is a fluid one, depending on the degree of engine protrusion in front of the front axle line, as manufacturers mount engines as far back in the chassis as possible. Not all manufacturers use the Front-Mid designation.

== Examples ==
=== FMR layout – Front Mid-engine / Rear-wheel drive ===
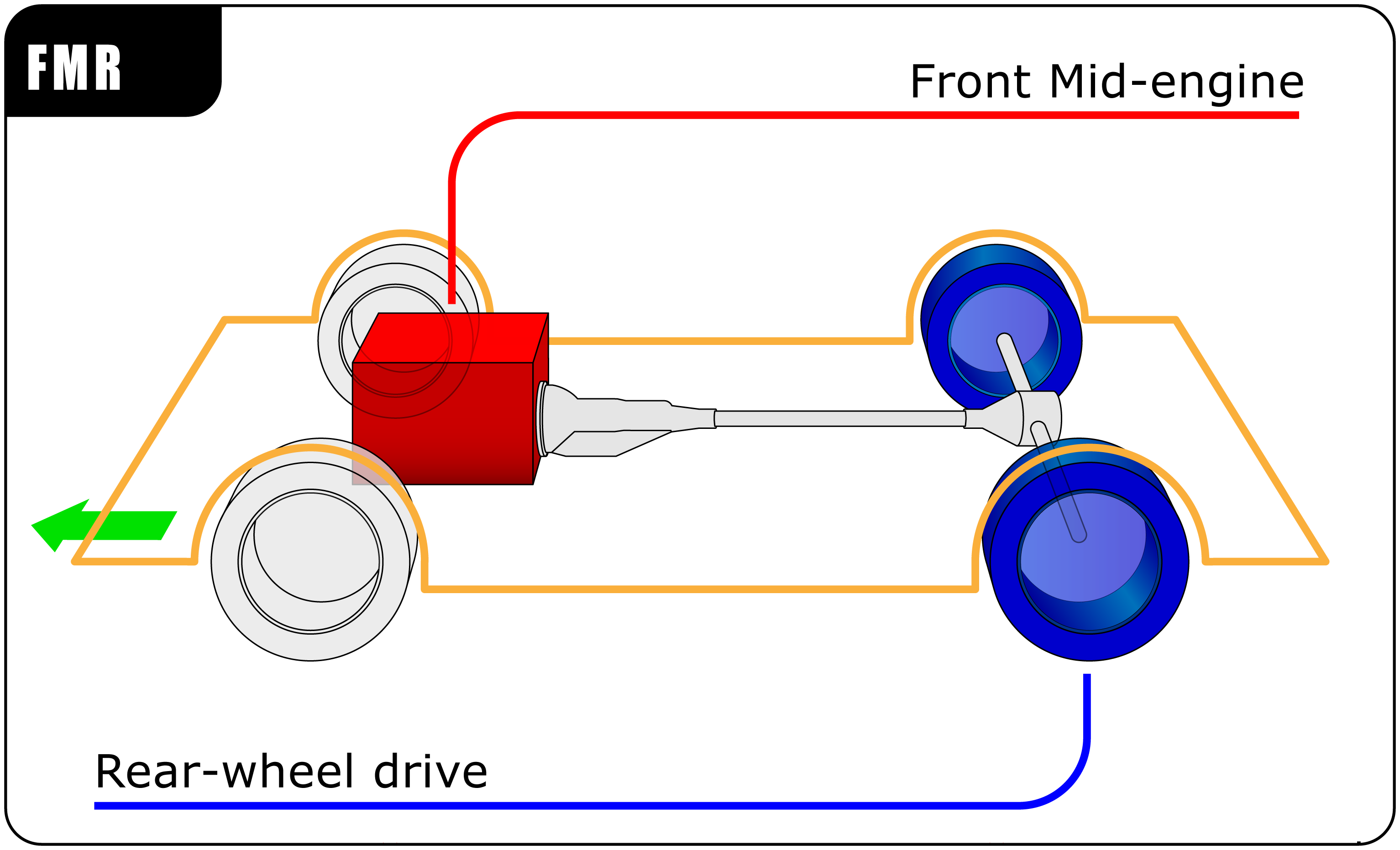
Front mid-engine position / Rear-wheel drive

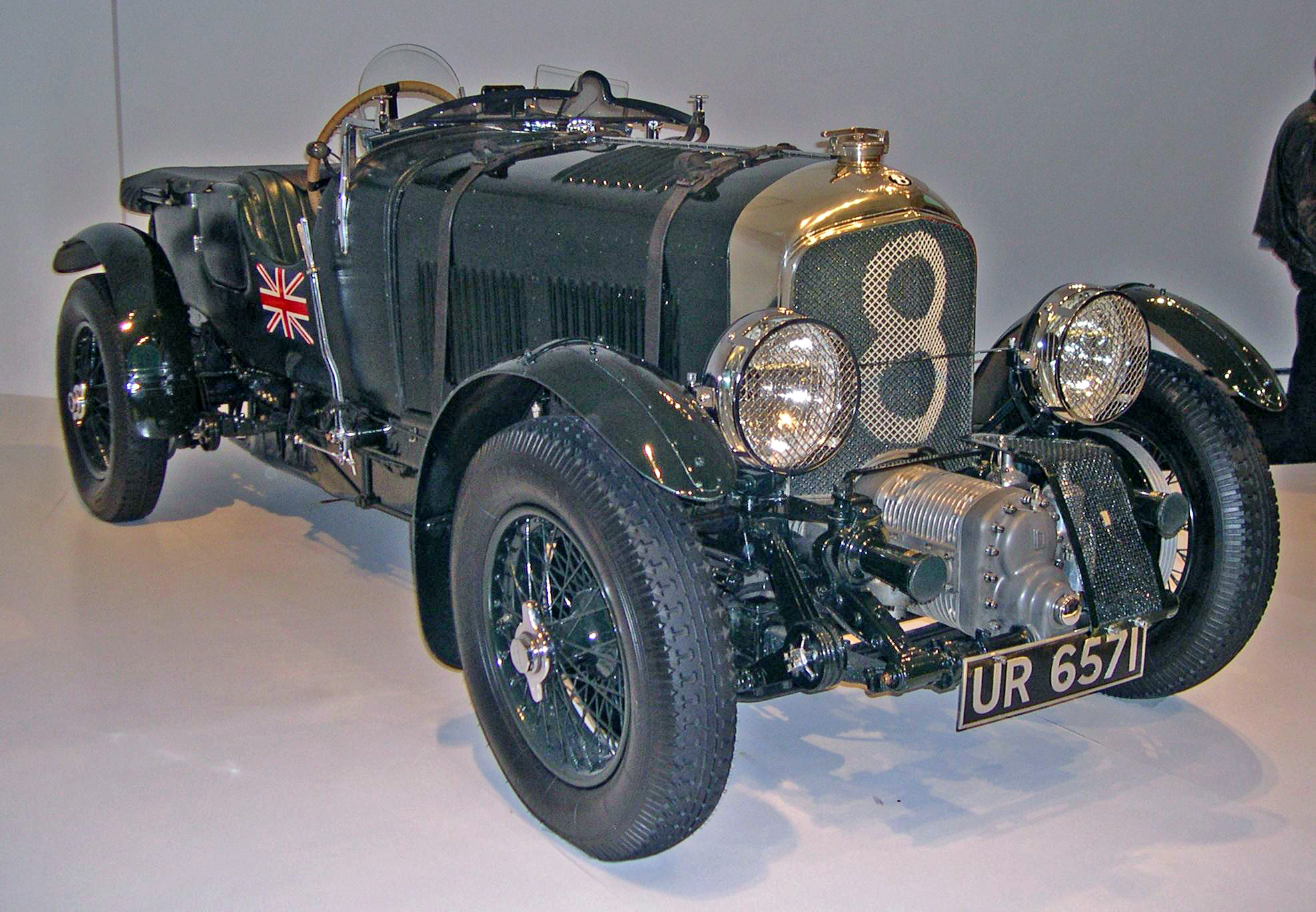
Front mid-engine position / Rear-wheel drive

These cars are RWD cars with the engine placed between the driver and the front axle.

- Alfa Romeo 8C Competizione
- AC Cobra
- Aston Martin Vanquish, Vantage (2005), Vantage (2018), DB7, DB9, DB11, DB12, DBS V12, DBS Superleggera, Virage (2011–2012)
- BMW Z1, Z8, M8 GTE
- Chevrolet Corvette (second through seventh generations)
- Bill Thomas Cheetah (used only one universal joint between transmission tailshaft housing and differential housing)
- Dodge A100 and Viper
- Excalibur SSK, SS Roadster and SS Phaeton
- Ferrari 250 GTO, 599 GTB Fiorano, 612 Scaglietti, F12 Berlinetta, 812 Superfast, GTC4Lusso T, California, Portofino, Roma and 12Cilindri
- Ford Econoline (first generation)
- Genesis G70 / Kia Stinger
- Honda S2000
- Infiniti G Line (third and fourth generation)
- Jaguar E-Type
- Lexus LFA
- Maserati Quattroporte V, GranTurismo/GranCabrio
- Mazda Bongo (second generation), RX-7, MX-5 (NC and ND) and RX-8
- Mercedes-Benz SSK, Mercedes-Benz SLR McLaren, SLS AMG and AMG GT
- MG Midget
- Morgan +4, 4/4, Aero 8, Plus Four, Plus Six and Plus 8
- Nissan Z (fifth through seventh generations)
- Opel GT (original)
- Reliant Robin
- Shelby Daytona
- Toyota Previa (first generation) and 2000GT
- Most pre–World War II front-engine rear-wheel-drive cars

=== FM4 layout – Front Mid-engine / Four-wheel drive ===
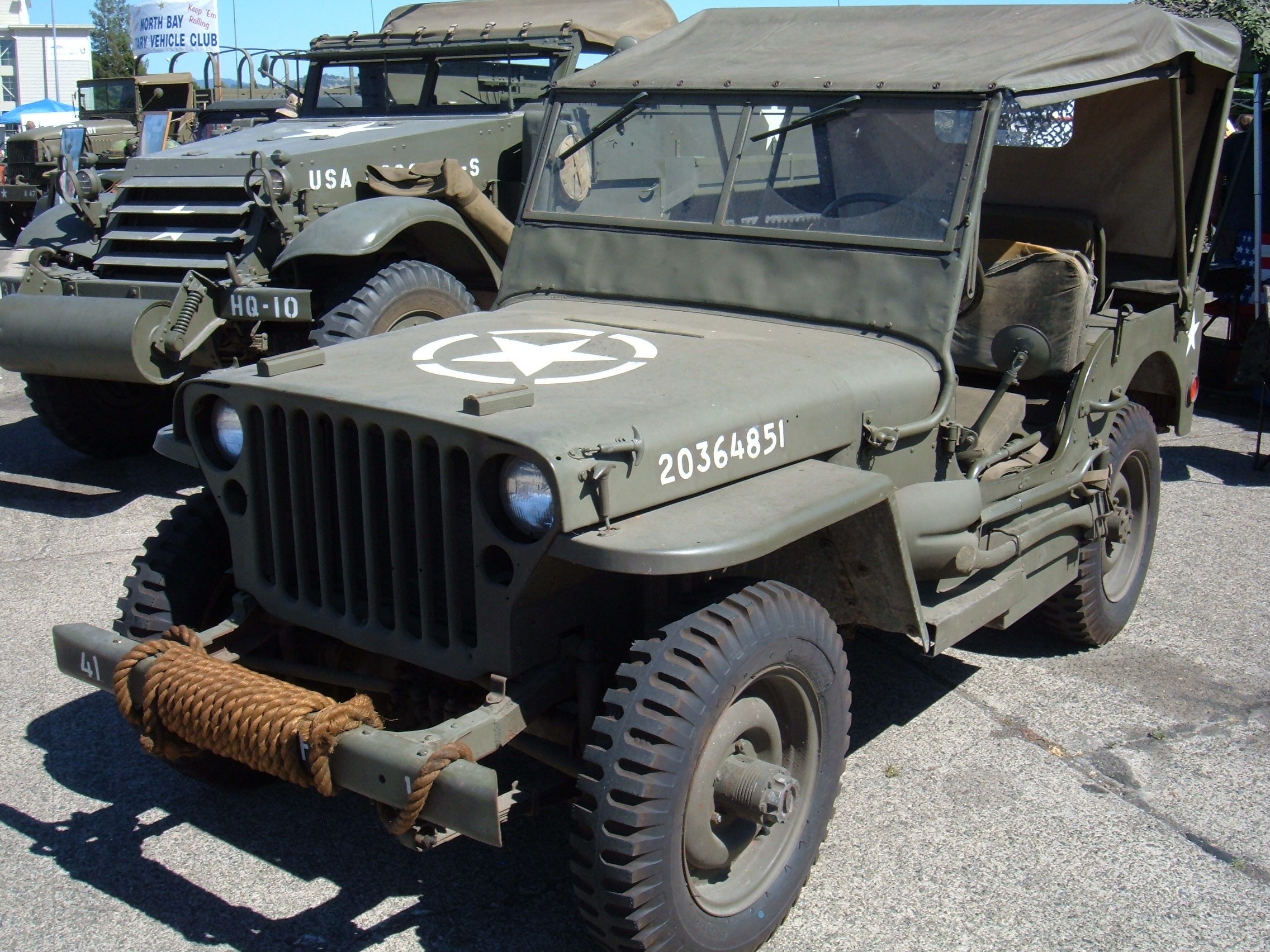
Front mid-engine position / Four-wheel drive

This layout, similar to the above FMR layout, with the engine between the driver and the front axle, adds front-wheel drive to become a four-wheel drive. An engineering challenge with this layout is getting the power to the front wheels past the engine – this would normally involve raising the engine to allow a propshaft to pass under the engine, or in the case of the Ferrari FF taking power from both ends of the crankshaft with two separate gearboxes.

- Toyota Previa All-Trac variant
- Ferrari FF, GTC4Lusso and Purosangue
- Genesis G70 / Kia Stinger
- Jensen FF
- Hummer H1
- Willys MB
- Nissan GT-R
- Most early front-engine off-road cars

=== RMR layout – Rear Mid-engine / Rear-wheel drive ===
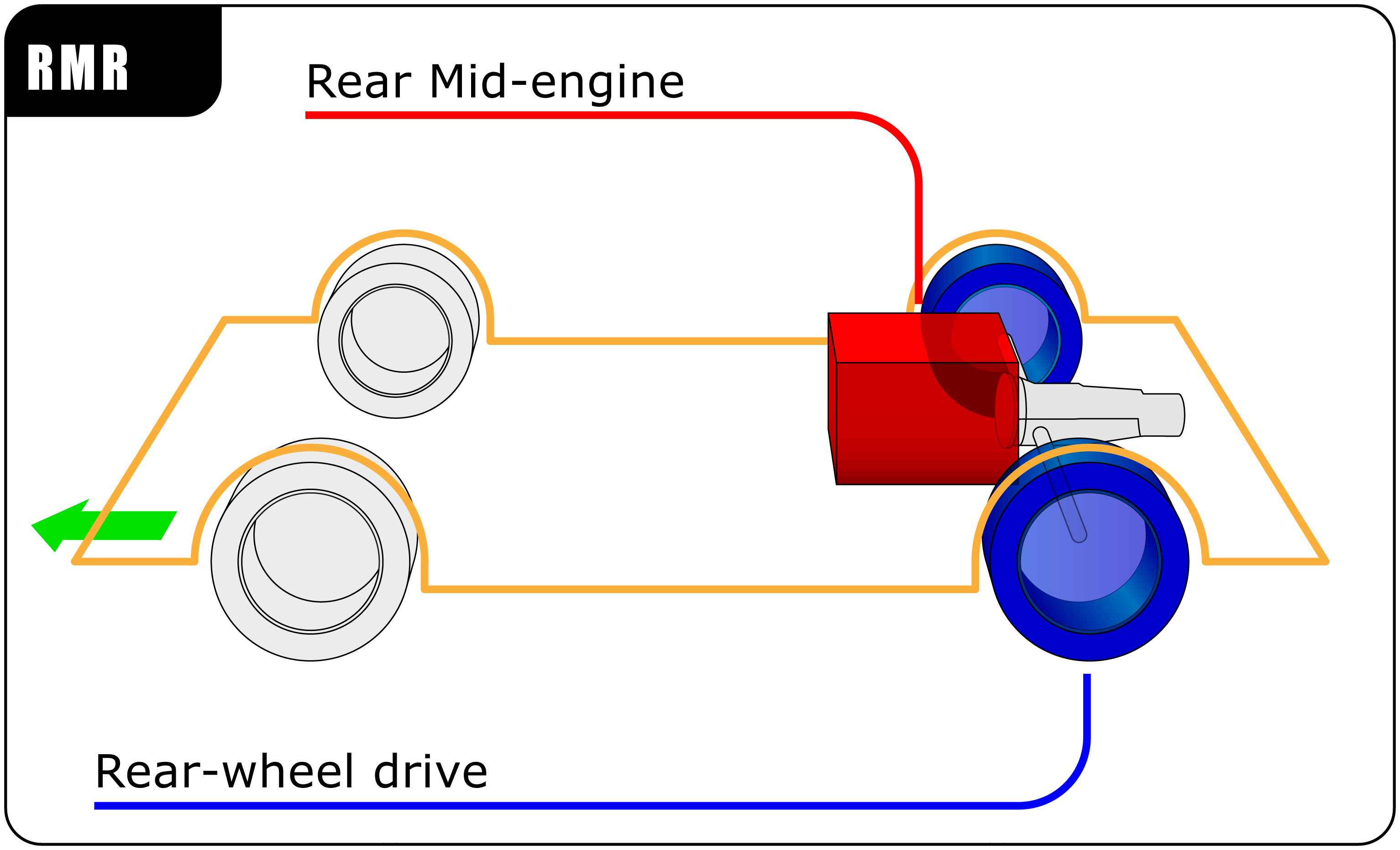
Rear mid-engine position / Rear-wheel drive

These cars use a traditional engine layout between the driver and the rear-drive axle. Typically, they're simply called MR; for mid-rear (engined), or mid-engine, rear-wheel-drive layout cars.

- Alfa Romeo 4C
- Alpine A110 (2017)
- Apollo Intensa Emozione
- Ariel Atom
- Aston Martin Valkyrie
- Autozam AZ-1
- BMW M1
- Chevrolet Corvette (C8)
- Consulier GTP
- DeTomaso Vallelunga, Mangusta, Pantera, Guarà
- Ferrari 250 LM, 308, 328, 348, F355, 360, F430, 458, 488, F8, 296 GTB, Berlinetta Boxer, Mondial, Testarossa, F40, F50, Enzo, FXX, LaFerrari, FXX-K
- Fiat X1/9
- Ford GT and GT40
- Gordon Murray Automotive T.33, T.50
- Ginetta F400, G60
- Honda Beat, NSX (NA1/NA2), S660, Honda Acty (2WD models only)
- Jaguar XJR-15 and XJ220
- Koenigsegg CC8S, CCR, CCX, Agera, Regera, Jesko
- Lamborghini Miura, Countach, Diablo SV
- Lancia Stratos, Montecarlo, Rally 037
- Lotus Europa, Esprit, Elise, Exige, Evora, Emira
- Maserati Merak, Bora, MC12, MC20
- Matra Djet, 530, Bagheera, Murena
- McLaren F1, MP4-12C, 570S, 650S, 720S, P1, GT, Artura, Senna, Speedtail, Elva
- Mercedes-Benz CLK GTR
- MG F / MG TF
- Mitsubishi i and i-MiEV (Rear Mid-engine transversely-mounted / Rear-wheel drive)
- Opel Speedster
- Pagani Huayra, Zonda, Utopia
- Pontiac Fiero
- Porsche 550, 914, Boxster/Cayman, Carrera GT, 911 GT1
- Renault 5 Turbo, Clio V6 Renault Sport
- Secma F16
- Smart Roadster
- Tatra 602
- Toyota MR2/MR-S
- Venturi Atlantique
- Volkswagen XL1

=== M4 layout – Rear Mid-engine / Four-wheel drive ===
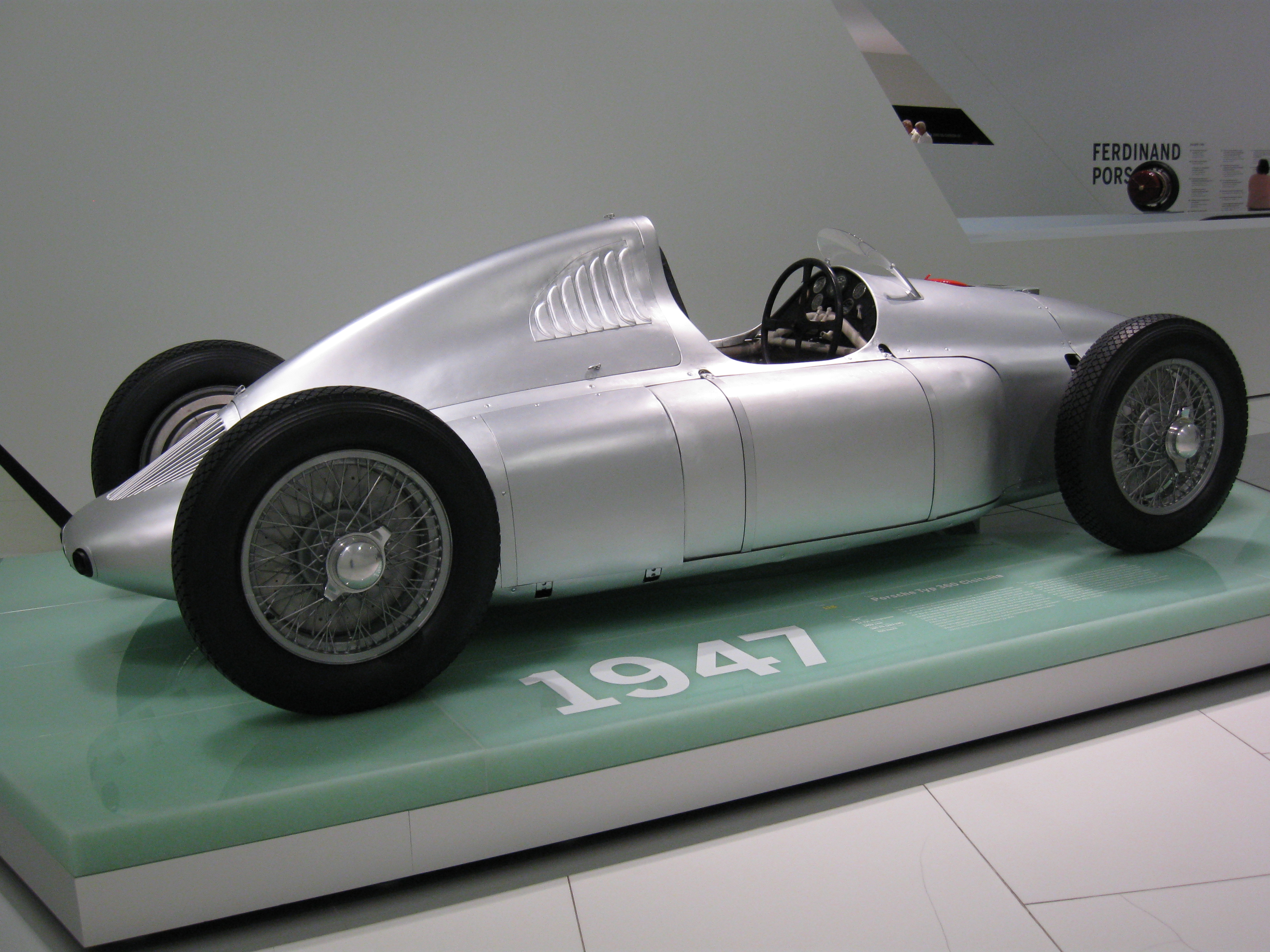
1940s Porsche 360 design for a Cisitalia Grand Prix car, with a supercharged engine behind the driver driving all 4 wheels

These cars use four-wheel drive with an engine behind the driver, between the axles.

- Ares Design Project1
- Audi R8
- BMW i8
- Bugatti EB 110, Veyron, Chiron, Divo, Centodieci
- Ford RS200
- Ferrari SF90 Stradale
- Honda Acty (4WD versions only), NSX (NC1), Z (1998-2002)
- Italdesign Zerouno
- Koenigsegg Gemera
- Lancia Delta S4
- Lamborghini Aventador, Centenario, Sián FKP 37, Countach LPI 800-4, Diablo VT series, Gallardo, Murciélago, Reventón, Huracán, Sesto Elemento
- Mercedes-AMG ONE
- MG Metro 6R4
- Panther Solo 2
- Peugeot 205 Turbo 16
- Porsche 918 Spyder
- Volvo L3314
- Unimog UGN/405

=== FMF layout – Front Mid-engine / Front-wheel drive ===
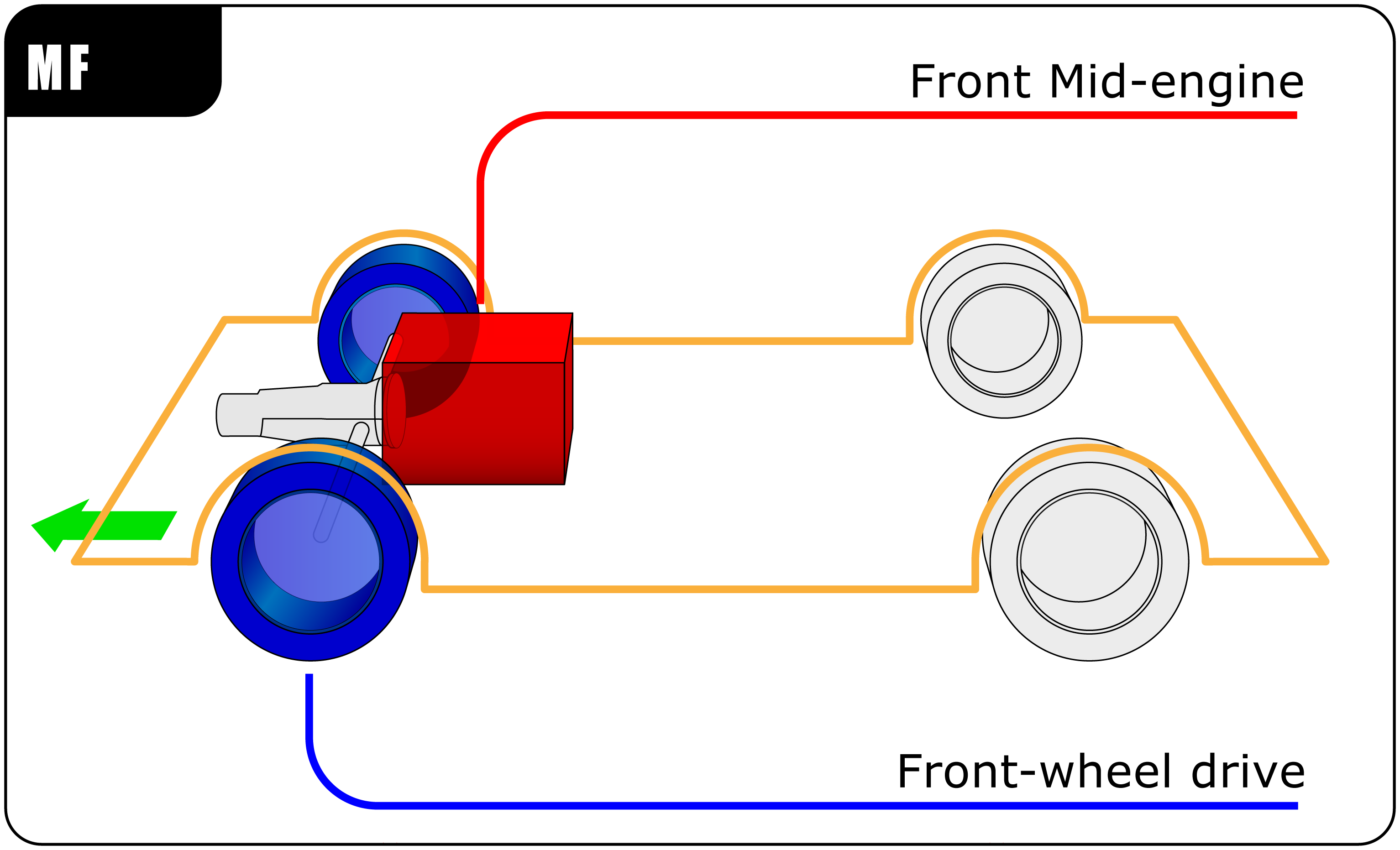
Front mid-engine position / Front-wheel drive

These cars are "mid-ship engined" vehicles, but they use front-wheel drive, with the engine in front of the driver. It is still treated as an FF layout, though, due to the engine's placement still being in the front of the car, contrary to the popular belief that the engine is placed in front of the rear axle with power transferred to the front wheels (an RMF layout). In most examples, the engine is longitudinally mounted rather than transversely as is common with FF cars.

- BSA Scout
- Citroën Traction Avant, DS, SM
- Nissan GT-R LM Nismo
- Renault 4, 5, 16
- Saab Sonett Mk1
- Honda Vigor/Inspire 1989–1995
- Maserati Quattroporte II
- Cord 810/812

== See also ==
- Front-engine design
- Rear-engine design
