= Asli (surname) =

Asli is an Asian surname. Notable people with the surname include:

- Arash Asli, Canadian businessman
- Aziz Asli (1938–2015), Iranian football goalkeeper, manager, and actor
- Haseri Asli (born 1974), sprinter from Brunei

== See also ==
- Aslı, Turkish feminine given name
