= Ginetta G60 =

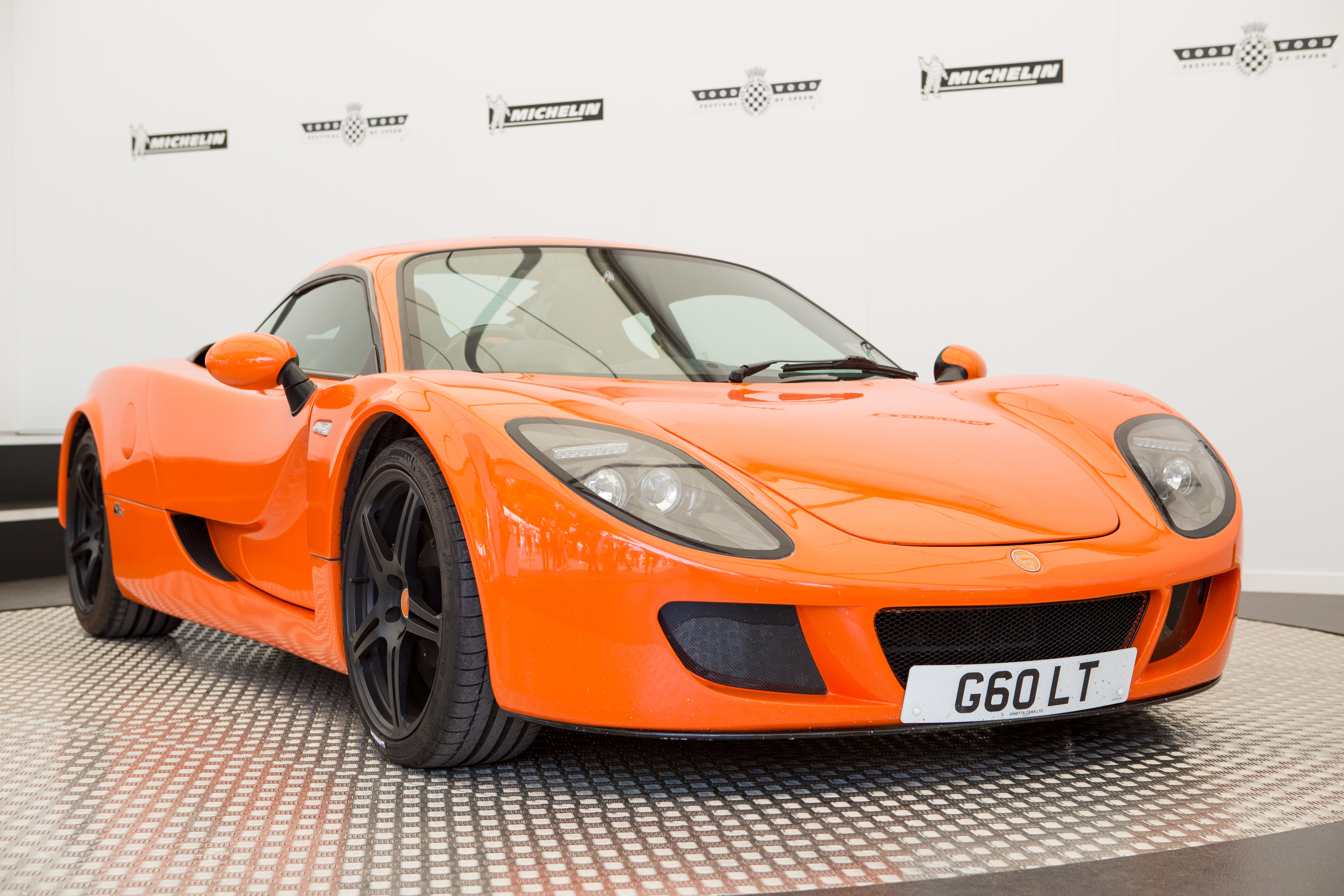

Overview
- Manufacturer: Ginetta Cars
- Production: 2012–2015 (50 units)
- Assembly: Leeds, Yorkshire, England

Body and chassis
- Class: Sports car (S)
- Body style: 2-door coupe
- Layout: rear mid-engine, rear wheel drive

Powertrain
- Engine: 3.7 L Ford Cyclone V6
- Transmission: 6-speed manual

Dimensions
- Wheelbase: 2,633 mm (103.7 in)
- Length: 3,126 mm (123.1 in)
- Width: 1,940 mm (76 in)
- Height: 1,180 mm (46 in)
- Kerb weight: 1,080 kg (2,380 lb)

Chronology
- Predecessor: Ginetta F400; Ginetta G50
- Successor: Ginetta G40 (Road Car and Race Car)

The Ginetta G60 is a mid-engined sports car produced by British car manufacturer Ginetta Cars, based on the Ginetta F400, which itself was based on the Farbio GTS.

== Specifications and Performance ==
The G60 is powered by a 3,727 cc (3.7 L) Ford Cyclone V6 engine producing 310 bhp (231 kW; 314 PS) at 6,500rpm and 288 lb⋅ft (390 N⋅m) of torque at 4,500rpm. The car was developed with driver focus in mind and therefore lacks an Anti-lock braking system, power steering and other modern technologies. It is constructed with a carbon fibre skin on a tubular steel chassis with a carbon fibre tub to maintain a low weight of 1,080 kg (2,380 lb). The interior is fairly basic and features Alcantara trim with a touch screen in the carbon fibre centre console to control all the features i.e. the satellite navigation system, climate control, audio system and air conditioning. A carbon fibre steering wheel with silver gauges along with bucket seats complete the interior.

The G60 can accelerate from a standstill to 60 mph in 4.9 seconds, with a top speed of 165 mph (265.5 km/h).

== Production ==
The G60 was first presented in October 2011, with a planned total production of 50 examples. Production began in 2012. The car was manufactured at the Ginetta factory in Garforth, Yorkshire, and only around 50 examples were produced from 2012 through 2015. The base price of a G60 in 2012 was £68,000 (US$105,000).

In November 2015, Ginetta ended production of the G60 citing poor sales and manufacturing that became increasingly cost prohibitive.
