= Arash Karimi =

Iranian photographer (born 1977)

Arash Karimi (Persian: آرش کریمی born 1977) is an Iranian photographer known for his documentary photos.

== Biography ==
He began his work in 1995 and has since held some exhibitions in different cities of Iran. Karimi won the Photographic Society of America Gold Medal at the New Photo Vision, an international photography contest in Serbia.
