= Arash Markazi =

American sports journalist (born 1980)

- Born: 1980 (age 45–46); Oklahoma City, Oklahoma, U.S.
- Occupation: Sports journalist

Arash Markazi (born 1980) is an American sports journalist and sports media personality.

Markazi attended the Walter Cronkite School of Journalism and Mass Communication Arizona State University and later the Annenberg School for Communication at the University of Southern California. He graduated with a degree in Print Journalism from USC in 2004. While at USC he won the Allan Malamud Memorial Scholarship and the Jim Murray Memorial Scholarship, named after the two former sports columnists at the Los Angeles Times. He later became an adjunct professor at USC and was on the board of directors for the Jim Murray Memorial Foundation. Markazi was hired by Sports Illustrated out of college and began writing stories for the magazine as a staff writer as well penning a weekly column for Sports Illustrated’s website SI.com, which led to the Los Angeles Times naming him one of the Faces to Watch in 2006. Markazi left for ESPN in 2009 where he became a senior writer based in Los Angeles, covering, among other teams, the Lakers, Dodgers and Kings.

In 2010 Markazi wrote an article for ESPN.com about a publicly advertised, ticketed party LeBron James was paid to host at Tao, a Las Vegas nightclub, shortly after “The Decision” aired on ESPN. The story was not the first or only one to chronicle the red-carpet event but it was pulled after a short time because Markazi, according to ESPN, “did not properly identify himself as a reporter or clearly state his intentions to write a story.” Markazi stated, “I stand by the accuracy of the story in its entirety, but should have been clearer in representing my intent to write about the events I observed.” Markazi, who had previously been photographed doing one-on-one interviews with James, was not disciplined by ESPN. Six years later, Markazi covered LeBron James and the Cleveland Cavaliers celebrating winning the NBA championship at XS, a Las Vegas nightclub, for ESPN. Markazi was invited to the party by an associate of Chris Bosh, according to ESPN, after he had written a similar story on a party Bosh threw one week earlier for his "Behind the Velvet Rope" column. The backlash to the article was mainly directed at ESPN after it had entered into a business relationship with James to produce “The Decision.” ESPN ombudsman Don Ohlmeyer wrote, "The reaction wasn't aimed at the story itself but rather at the perception that ESPN was hiding something, trying to protect a star athlete from embarrassing revelations or covering up news to protect a valued relationship. The article itself was rather innocuous. Other than an off-color remark by James and the chronicling of some testosterone-driven antics, it was -- by modern day standards -- fairly benign. No arrests. No indecent behavior. No controversy."

In 2011, an Internet video Markazi shot of Kate Upton doing the dougie hip-hop dance while they were attending a Los Angeles Clippers game together went viral and served to increase her popularity.

In 2019 Markazi was hired as a sports columnist by the Los Angeles Times. He conducted the first interview with Anthony Davis after he was traded to the Lakers, one of the final sit-down interviews with Kobe Bryant and wrote a front-page story about losing 130 pounds in one year. He resigned in 2020 after his colleagues in the sports department demanded an internal investigation into his work. No one ever accused Markazi of stealing their work but Los Angeles Times executive editor Norman Pearlstine said the investigation did find he had used sentences from news releases sent to him for use five times and sentences he had previously written that had been published elsewhere twice. The sentences from the seven articles were largely numbers based such as the salaries of NBA 2K League players and the cost of XFL season tickets. He left during a turbulent summer for the Los Angeles Times, which settled a lawsuit over race and gender bias and wrote an examination on its failures on race during that time.

In 2020 Markazi began hosting The Arash Markazi Show on The Mightier 1090 and Spotify and writing the newsletter The Morning Column. He also became an on-air interviewer for the WWE.

He is a two-time cancer survivor.
