= Arash Ostovari =

Iranian footballer (born 1992)

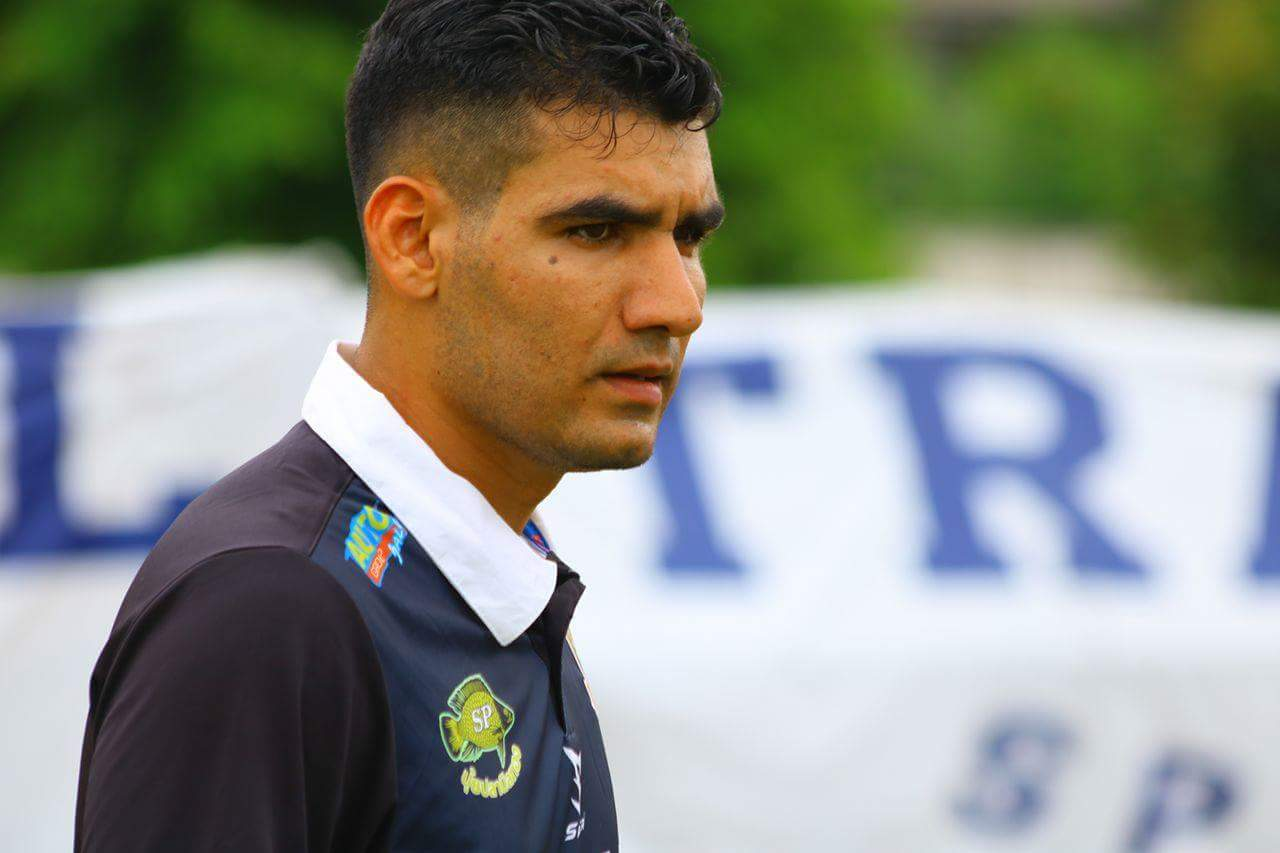

Personal information
- Date of birth: 12 December 1992 (age 33)
- Place of birth: Shiraz, Iran
- Height: 1.83 m (6 ft 0 in)
- Position: Defender

Team information
- Current team: Lusitano VRSA
- Number: 23

Youth career
- 2006–2007: Bargh Shiraz
- 2007–2008: Esteghlal
- 2008–2009: Fajr Sepasi

Senior career*
Years	Team	Apps	(Gls)
2009–2011	PLUS	19	(3)
2011–2012	Al-Nasr	22	(8)
2012–2013	Pasargad		
2013	Mondoñedo		
2013–2016	Air force FC	26	(6)
2016	Bangkok United	8	(1)
2016-2018	Lusitano VRSA	15	(2)
2018	kalasin	7	
2018-2020	Bukit Timah Juniors FC	14	(7)
2020	Kirivong Sok Sen Chey FC		

International career
2009–2010	Iran U17	12	(3)
2011	Iran U20	11	(5)
- * Club domestic league appearances and goals as of 9 April 2017

Arash Ostovari (Persian: آرش استواری, born 12 December 1992) is an Iranian professional footballer who plays as a midfielder for Kirivong Sok Sen Chey FC and former player of Iran U17 and Iran U20.

== Career ==
Ostovari was born in Shiraz, Iran.

=== Iran ===
Ostovari returned to Iran in 2013 to serve the mandatory military service of Iran at Air force FC in Shiraz.

=== Thailand ===
He returned to Pacific Asia with Thai Premier League by joining Bangkok United.

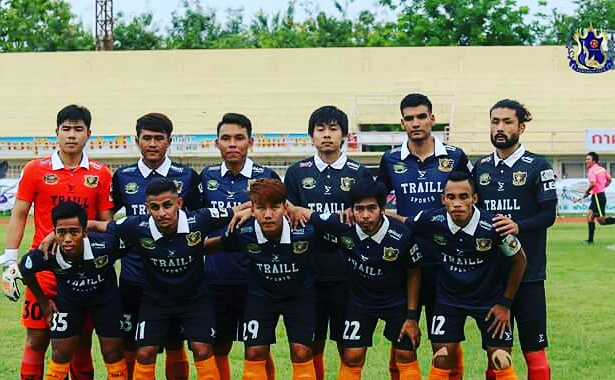
Ostovari playing for Kalasin FC, Thailand in 2018

=== Portugal ===
Ostovari is the only Iranian player to win the Champion title in three different foreign leagues. He was transferred to Portuguese club Lusitano VRSA the 1 delegation of S.L. Benfica, in 2016 after playing in the Thai Premier League and was selected as the player of the season at the end of the season by Portuguese fans.

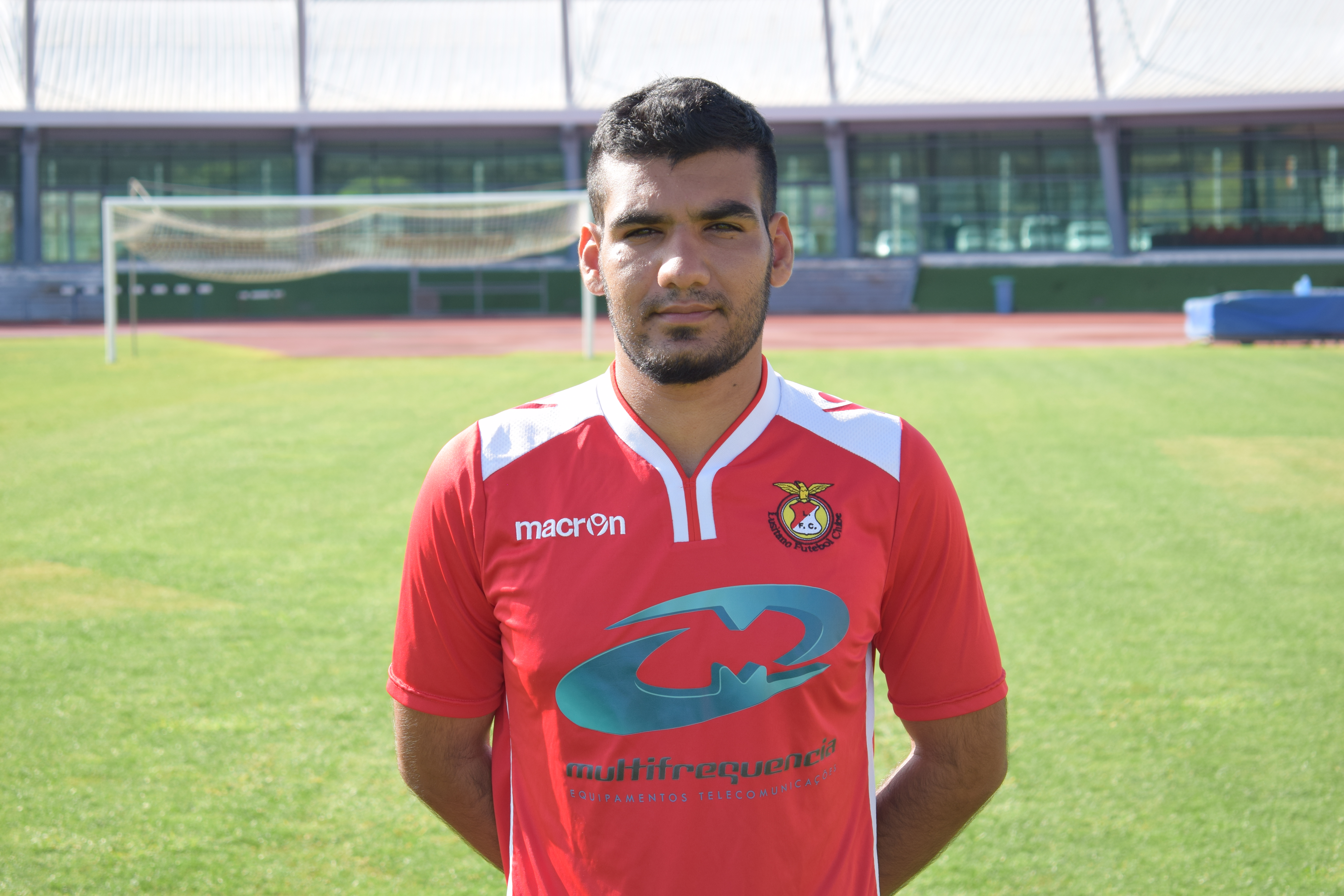
Arash Ostovari at Estádio Municipal de Vila Real de Santo António, Lusitano Vrsa fc 2016

The club channel made a documentary of his life in Portugal as the first Iranian players who was transferred to Portugal. Working with Ricardo Sousa had a big impact in his career.

Ostovari was nicknamed the Iranian Ricardo Quaresma for his style of play.

=== Singapore ===
Ostovari is a resident of Singapore, Where he Joined Bukit Timah Juniors FC on 2018 and was the Capitan of this club. Ostovari played for another Singaporean club Admiralty CSC later on as well.

=== Canada ===
in November 2023 Ostovari Joined Port Moody div 3 VMSL in British Columbia

He has also played for Iran's national youth and Olympic Football teams. He played for Esteghlal Tehran FC, Bargh Shiraz FC, Al Naser FC, Bangkok United FC and Lusitano VRSA.
