= Aslı Duman =

Turkish water polo player

Personal information
- Nationality: Turkish
- Born: 23 November 1992 (age 33)
- Height: 166 cm (65 in)
- Weight: 64 kg (141 lb)

Sport
- Sport: Water polo
- Handedness: R
- Position: Point
- Current club: Ege Water Sports and Tennis Club
- Number: 4
National team
- Years: Team
- 2016: Turkey

Aslı Duman (born 23 November 1992) is a Turkish female water polo player, playing at the point position. She is part of the Turkey women's national water polo team. She competed at the 2016 Women's European Water Polo Championship.

She is a member of Ege Water Sports and Tennis Club.
