= Ginetta F400 =

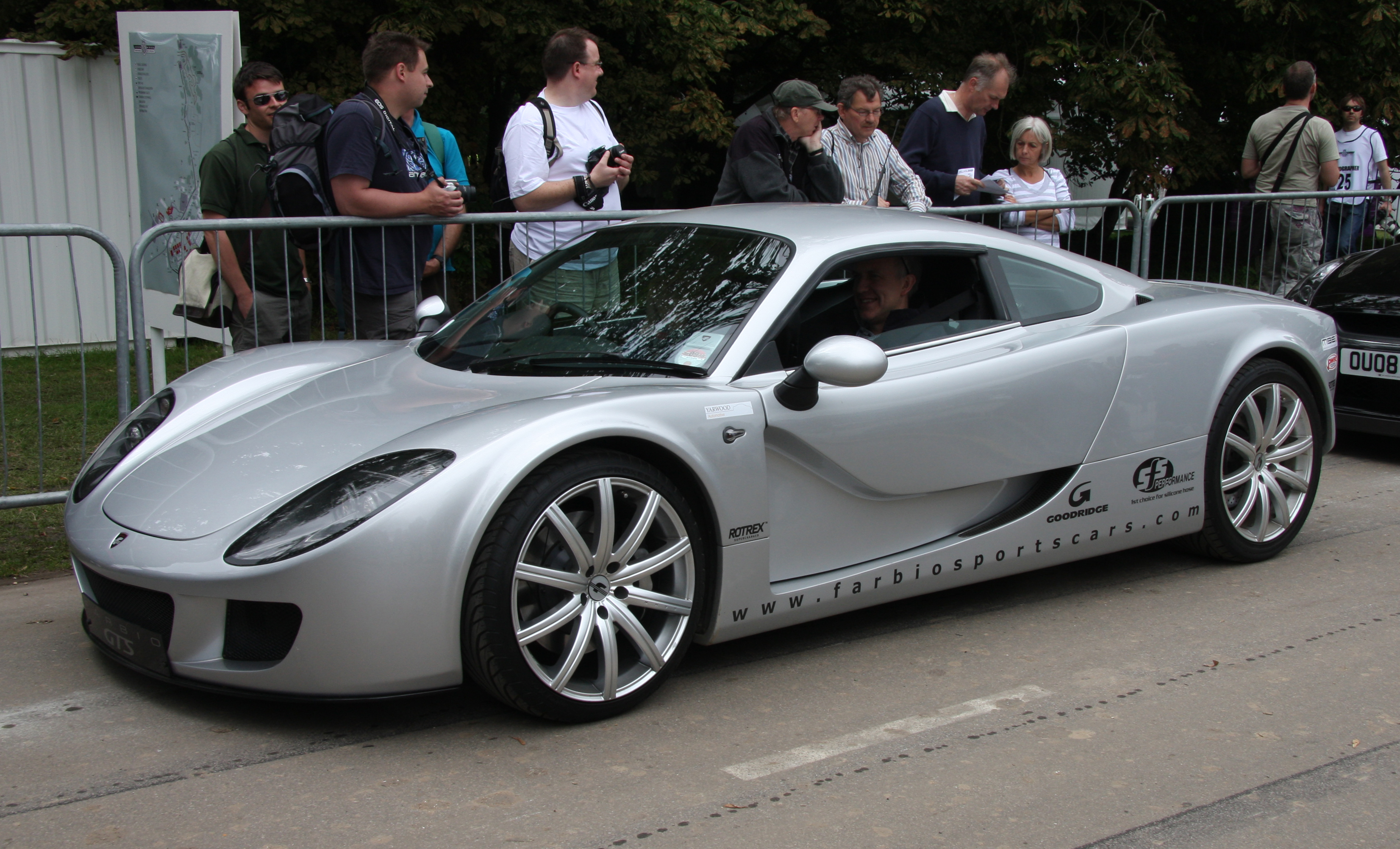

Overview
- Manufacturer: Ginetta Cars
- Also called: Farbio GTS
- Production: 2005–2007 (Farboud); 2007–2010 (Farbio); 2010–2011 (Ginetta)
- Model years: 2004–2011
- Assembly: Leeds, Yorkshire, England

Body and chassis
- Class: Sports car (S)
- Body style: 2-door coupe
- Layout: Rear mid-engine, rear-wheel-drive
- Related: Farboud GTS

Powertrain
- Engine: 2.8 L Audi 30v twin turbo V6 (Farboud GT); 3.0 L EA839 TFSI Twin-Turbo V6 (Farbio GTS); 3.0 L Ford Cologne supercharged V6 (GTS); 3.0 L Ford Cologne V6 (F400)
- Transmission: 6-speed manual

Dimensions
- Wheelbase: 2,675 mm (105 in)
- Length: 4,220 mm (166 in)
- Width: 2,130 mm (84 in)
- Height: 1,170 mm (46 in)
- Kerb weight: 1,036 kg (2,284 lb)

Chronology
- Successor: Ginetta G60

The Ginetta F400, previously known as the Farbio GTS, and originally developed by Arash Motor Company as the Farboud GTS, is a sports car produced by the British car manufacturer Ginetta Cars. It was the first car planned for production by Farbio Sports Cars until the rights of the car were sold to Ginetta in 2010.

== Farbio GTS/Farboud GT ==
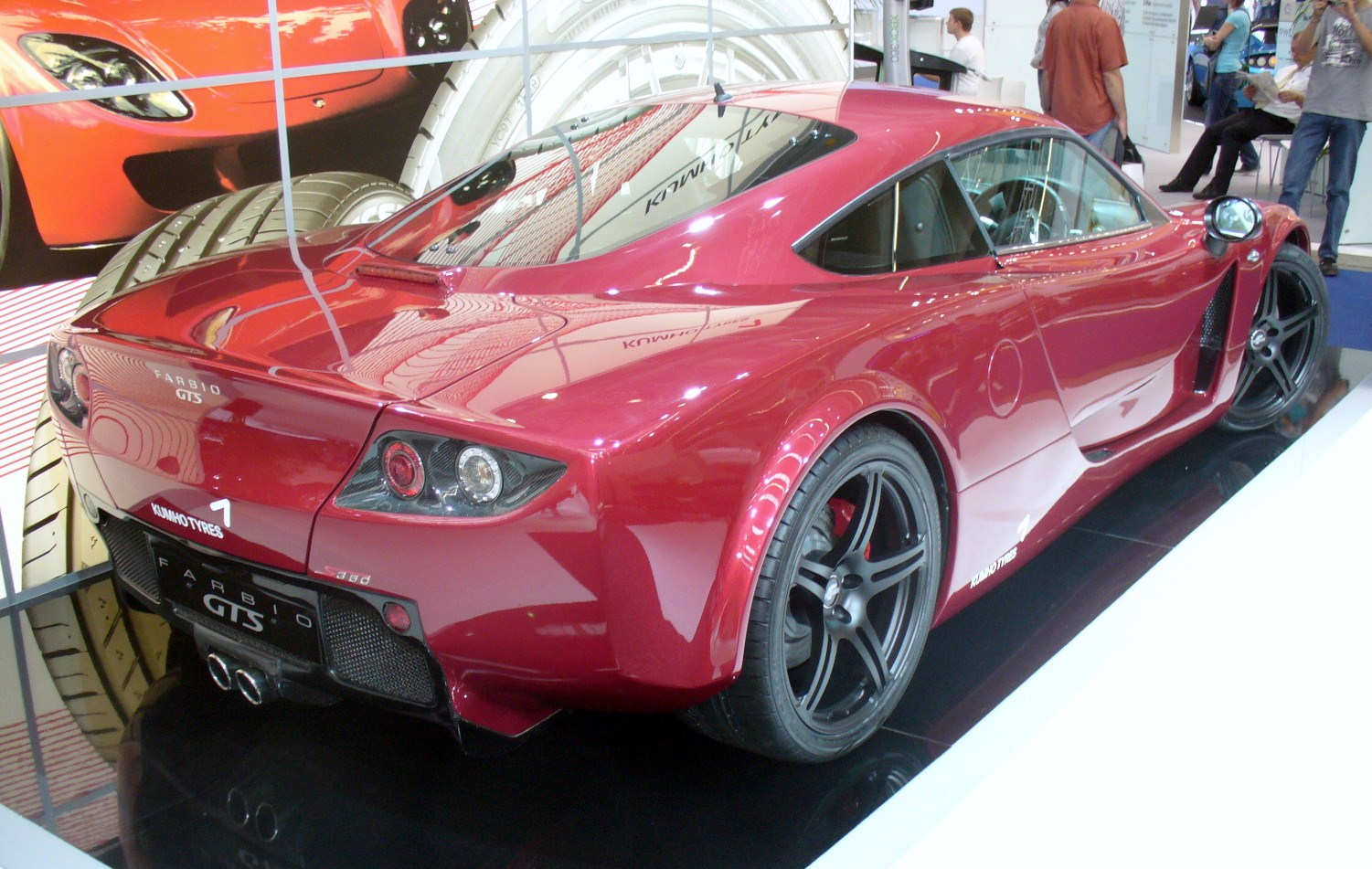
Farbio GTS350 (rear)

Farbio GTS350
Farbio GTS350 at the 2009 Goodwood Festival of Speed

The Farbio GTS was originally conceived in 2002 as the Farboud GT with a twin-turbocharged Audi V6 engine from the Audi RS4. The GTS was unveiled at the 2004 British International Motorshow featuring the Audi engine, developing 440 bhp (328 kW).

Arash sold the rights of the car to the newly established Farbio Sports cars which eventually launched the car as the Farbio GTS in 2007 with sales commencing from the beginning of 2008.

Three engine options were offered, with the GTS 260, 350 and 400. Both the GTS 350 and 400 featured a supercharged 3.0-litre Ford V6 engine derived from the V6 in the Ford Mustang. The engine in the GTS 400 generated a power output of 384 bhp (286 kW), providing a 0–60 mph (97 km/h) acceleration time of 3.9 seconds, with a top speed of over 175 mph (282 km/h). The base GTS 260 model with 262 bhp (195 kW) could reach 60 mph in 4.8 seconds.

== F400 ==
When Ginetta acquired the rights of the car in 2010, very little was altered from the original Farbio GTS, except the addition of a new supercharger to the Ford V6 engine. The engine then generated a power output of 410 bhp (306 kW) and was coupled to a 6-speed manual transmission. Standard features for the F400 included adjustable black leather interior, leather trimmed dashboard, power-assisted sports steering, a Kenwood audio system and air conditioning. Other bespoke options included interior carpeting, coloured headliners, carbon fibre racing bucket seats trimmed in leather with four-point racing harness, carbon fibre steering wheel, coloured door inserts and an Alcantara interior trim.

The F400 came with special 19-inch forged alloy wheels in gloss black or silver finish. Added exterior options included bespoke specialist paint, bare carbon doors, brake callipers painted in red colour and heated front windshield.

The F400 could accelerate from 0–97 km/h (0–60 mph) in 3.7 seconds and could attain a top speed of 185 mph (298 km/h). Although these figures were never tested.

The F400 was sold in limited numbers at a price of £95,000 (US$154,770) when production was halted in 2010 and the car underwent significant redevelopment to be relaunched at the end of 2011 as the Ginetta G60.
