= Arash Soosarian =

Iranian footballer

Personal information
- Full name: Arash Soosarian
- Date of birth: 10 August 1986 (age 40)
- Place of birth: Iran
- Position: Defender

Youth career
- 2004–2008: Malavan

Senior career*
Years	Team	Apps	(Gls)
2008–2012	Malavan	7	(0)
- * Club domestic league appearances and goals as of 22 August 2011 (UTC)

Arash Soosarian (Persian: آرش سوساریان born August 10, 1986) is an Iranian footballer who plays for Malavan F.C. in the IPL.

== Club career ==
Soosarian has played his entire career with Malavan F.C.

Club performance			League		Cup		Continental		Total	
Season	Club	League	Apps	Goals	Apps	Goals	Apps	Goals	Apps	Goals
Iran			League		Hazfi Cup		Asia		Total	
2008–09	Malavan	Pro League	4	0			-	-		
2009–10	Malavan	Pro League	3	0			-	-		
2010–11	Malavan	Pro League	0	0	0	0	-	-	0	0
2011–12	Malavan	Pro League	0	0	0	0	-	-	0	0
Career total			7	0				0		

- Assist Goals

Season	Team	Assists
10–11	Malavan	0
11-12	Malavan	0
