= Aslı Gökyokuş =

Turkish singer (born 1977)

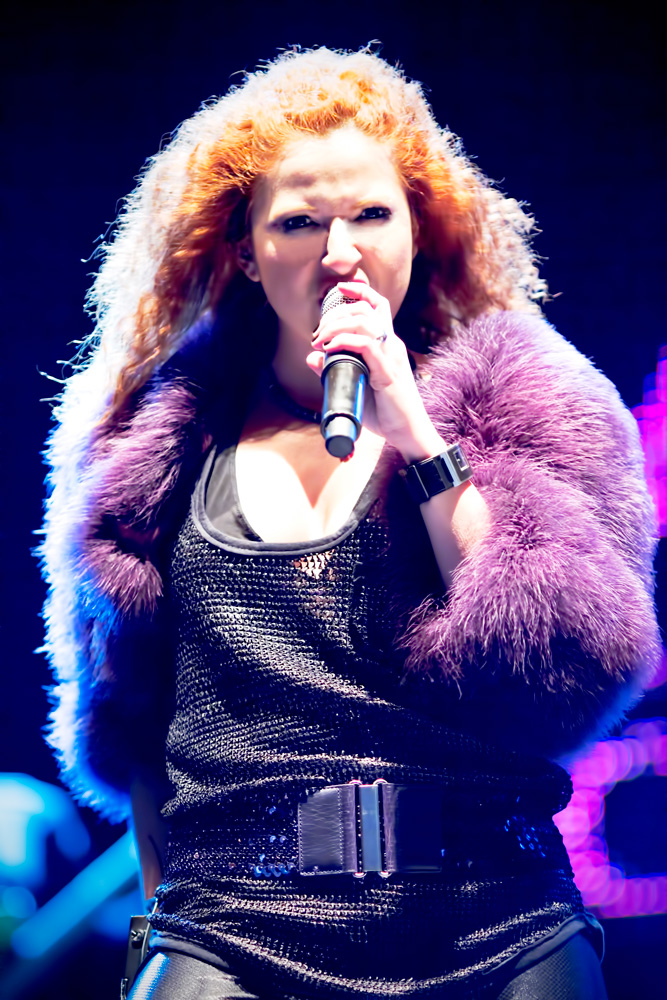

Background information
- Born: 26 October 1977 (age 48); Istanbul, Turkey
- Genres: Rock
- Occupation: Singer-songwriter
- Years active: 1997-present
- Labels: NR1 Müzik
- Website: Official web site

Aslı Gökyokuş (born 26 October 1977) is a Turkish singer.

== Life and career ==
=== Early experience with Music ===
Aslı Gökyokuş, who is also known as Aslı was born on 26 October 1977 in Istanbul. Her work in music began with the band that she helped form during her years at high school, which was called "Phoenix". The group started off like any other garageband, which had their members doing their own thing and performing gigs at their high school whenever possible. Following their high school years, a few of the founding members of the band left and only to be replaced by new interested members. Of course, Aslı stayed as she continued performing and working with her band mates. With the new group members being added, the band decided to change their names to that of, "Mary Jane". Their music basically consisted of rearranging cover hits and performing at local halls, bars and wherever they had been invited to perform.

=== Working with other Turkish artists ===
Their first performance occurred at the Beyoğlu Guitar Bar. They then went on to perform at the famous Kemancı rock bar for three years in Istanbul. Aslı has worked with Ümit Öztürk (at guitar) in the album Neresindeyim; Sessizzce song is Ümit's song in the album. It was during this period that Aslı's publicity and fame began to rise. Her strong vocal performance with the band helped her raise some eyebrows and so it was not long before she found herself being offered to be a back vocalist for famous Turkish rock artist, Haluk Levent. Aslı had worked with Haluk for short period of time. She then moved on and agreed to be a back vocalist for yet another famous Turkish artist, Teoman. Aslı had worked with Teoman for a longer period of time and through these experiences, she began to gain further knowledge in the music industry. Moreover, during the same period as she was being a back vocalist, she took courses in singing and solfège which naturally expanded her knowledge in music in general.

=== Neresindeyim & Su Gibi ===
Following all these experiences and background knowledge she achieved, Aslı decided to step up and record her own album with the support of her friends, Serkan Çeliköz and Selim Öztürk who are members of the famous Turkish group, Kargo. Aslı would go on and sign a contract with Sony Music Turkey and concentrated her attention at working into releasing her first album. Unfortunately, things did not seem as easy as earlier as expected and so the following year she relied on the help of famous composers, Serkan and Selim to direct her attention as well as guide her through this first solo journey into releasing an album. After all the intensive work at the studio for roughly three years, Aslı had finally been able to release her first album in 2000 which was titled, "Neresindeyim" in 2000. Some of the singles released from this album includes "Ölüm Kapımı Çalmasa da", "Keşf’i Alem" and "Sessizce". The album had some relative success at the beginning, though it was not a popular sell-out album. Due to that, Aslı took a little break from the whole music industry and finally ended up coming out with her second album called "Su Gibi" in 2004. Some of the singles released off from this album include, "Su Gibi", "Tüm Şehir Ağladı", and "Kördüğüm". All of the tracks in this album had been composed by Aslı herself.

=== Dans Etmeye İhtiyacım Var ===
In April 2007, Aslı went on to release her third album which is titled, "Söylediğim Şarkılarda Saklı". Surprisingly, it has managed to achieve a lot of attention and success thus far. Her first single released, "Dans Etmeye İhtiyacım Var" (which means "I need to dance") is frequently played on Turkish radio and TV stations. A few months afterwards, Aslı went on to release her second single called, "Yardımcı Olmuyor" (which means "It doesn't help"). It too has managed to receive a lot of attention and airplay throughout Turkish Radio and TV stations as well.

== Discography ==
=== Albums ===
- Neresindeyim (2000)
- Su Gibi (2004)
- Söylediğim Şarkılarda Saklı (2007)
- Dünya (2018)

=== Singles ===
- Büyüdük (2010)
- Gökyüzünde Yalnız Gezen Yıldızlar (2012)
- Üç Cemre (2015)
