= Arash =

Heroic archer-figure of Iranian mythology

Arash the Archer
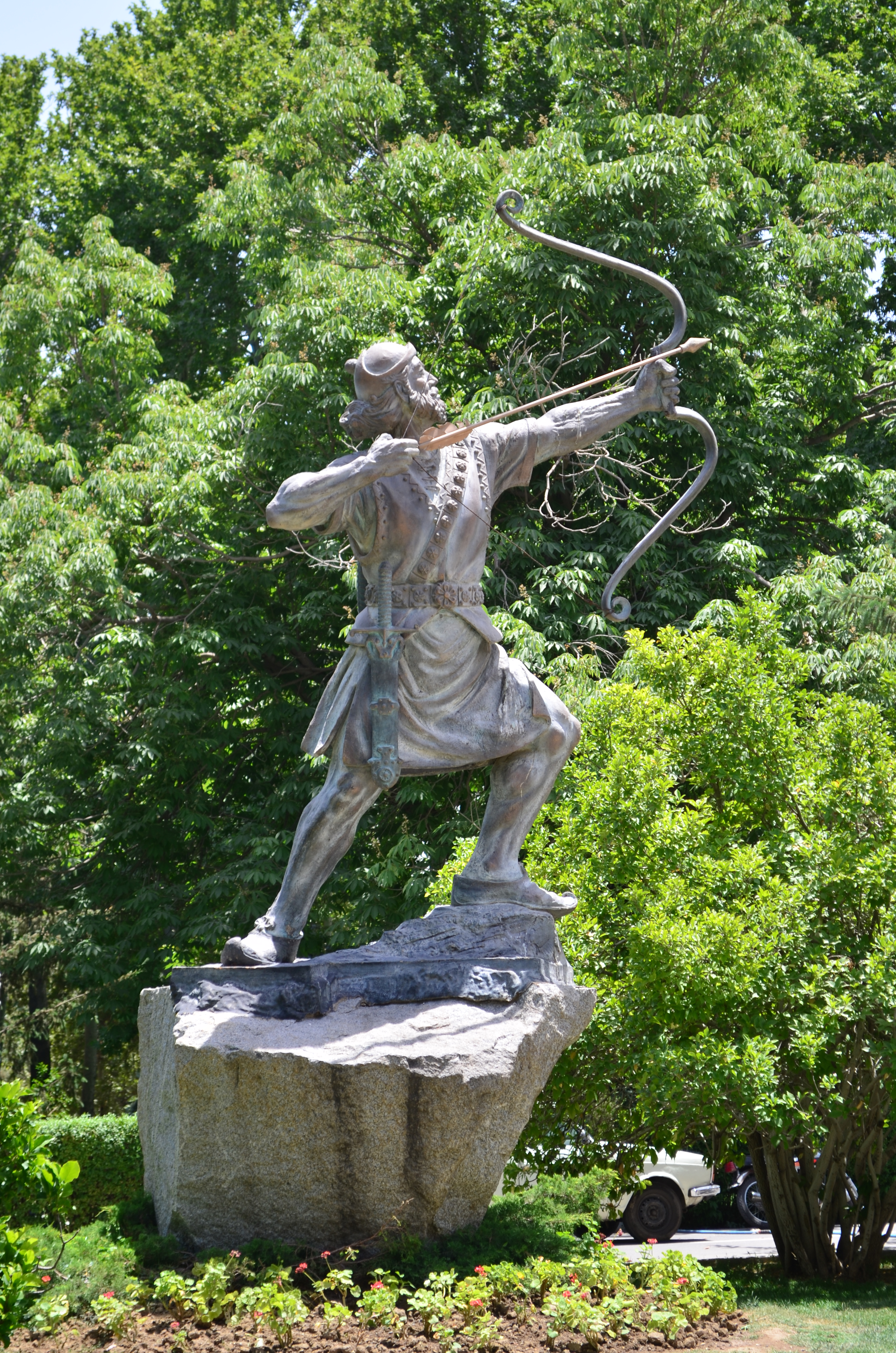

Arash the Archer (Persian: آرش کمانگیر, romanized: Āraš-e Kamāngīr) is a heroic archer-figure of Iranian mythology and historical tradition.

According to Iranian folklore, in the aftermath of a Turanian invasion that overran much of Iran, the boundary between the two nations was agreed to be set by an arrow launched by Arash. He put his own life in the arrow's launch, and the arrow travelled an exceptionally long distance before finally landing on the other side of the Oxus on the bark of a walnut tree atop a mountain.

== Origins of the name ==
Although several sources (e.g. al-Biruni) appear to have considered 'Arash' to be the origin of the name 'Arshak' (i.e. Arsaces), the name of the Parthian dynasty derives from a Parthian or Eastern Iranian equivalent of 'Ardashir', i.e. 'Artaxerxes', specifically Artaxerxes II, from whom the Arsacids claimed descent. (Within the scheme of the mythologically conflated genealogies of Iranian dynasts, the Arsacids also claimed to descend—via the other Arash—from Kai Kobad.)

As is typical for names from oral tradition, there are numerous variations of 'Arash'. In the Avesta the name appears as 'Erekhsha' (Ǝrəxša) "of the swift arrow, having the swiftest arrow among the Iranians" (Yasht 8.6). This Avestan-language form continues in Zoroastrian Middle Persian as 'Erash' (Bundahishn, Shahrastanha-i Eran, Zand-i Vahuman Yasht, Mah i Frawardin), from which the anglicized 'Eruch' derives. New Persian forms include 'Erash' and 'Irash' in al-Tabari and ibn al-Atir; Aarashshebatir in al-Tabari; 'Arash' in al-Talebi; 'Aarash' in Maqdesi, Balami, Mojmal, Marasi, al-Biruni, and in the Vis o Ramin of Gorgani. Names with a stock epithet representing the Avestan "swift arrow" include al-Tabari's 'Aarashshebatir' and Mojmal's 'Arash-e Shewatir'. A surname form includes 'Arash/Aarash kaman-gir' "Arash, bow-expert." Also it’s a common name for people that lived there.

== Summary ==
The basic story of the bowman runs as follows: In a war between the Iranians and Turanians over the "royal glory" (khwarrah), the Turanian general Afrasiab has surrounded the forces of the righteous Manuchehr, and the two sides agree to make peace. Both reach an agreement that whatever land falls within the range of a bow-shot shall be returned to Manuchehr and the Iranians, and the rest should then fall to Afrasiab and the Aniranians. An angel (in al-Biruni it is Isfandaramad, i.e. the Amesha Spenta Spenta Armaiti, in Middle Persian called Spendarmad) instructs Manuchehr to construct a special bow and arrow, and Arash is asked to be the archer. Arash then shoots the specially-prepared arrow at dawn, which travels a great distance (see below) before finally landing and thereby marking the future border between the Iranians and the Aniranians.

In Talebi and Bal'ami, Arash is destroyed by the shot and disappears. In al-Tabari, he is exalted by the people, is appointed commander of the archers and lives out his life in great honor. The distance the arrow travels varies: in one, it is a thousand leagues (farsakhs), and in another, forty days' walk. In several, the arrow traveled from dawn to noon; in others, from dawn until sunset. A few sources specify a particular date for the event. The Middle Persian Mah i Frawardin notes the 6th day of the 1st month (i.e. Khordad of Frawardin); later sources associate the event with the name-day festivities of Tiregan (13th of Tir) "presumably" provoked by the homonymity with the Yazata Tir or tir "arrow." (Tafażżolī 1987, p. 266)

The location from which Arash fired his arrow varies as well. In the Avesta (which does not mention places in Western Iran), it is Airyo.khshaotha, an unidentified location in the Middle Clime. Islamic-era sources typically place the location of the shot somewhere just south of the Caspian Sea, variously in Tabaristan (Tabari, Talebi, Maqdesi, Ibn al-Athir, Marashi) and (al-Biruni, Gardēzī); Amol fortress (Mojmal); Mount Damavand (Balami) or Sari (Gorgani). The place the arrow landed is variously identified as 'Mount Khvanvant' in the Avesta (likewise an unknown location); a river in Balkh (Tabari, al-Atir); east of Balkh (Talebi); Bactria/Tokharistan (Maqdesi, Gardizi); the banks of the Oxus River (Balami) or Merv (Mojmal). According to al-Biruni, it hit a walnut tree between "Fargana" and Tabaristan "in the furthest reaches of [Greater] Khorasan."

The name "Arash" (Persian: آرش) remains a popular name among Iranians.

== Modern legend ==
Siavash Kasraie, an Iranian poet, wrote the long poem of Arash the Archer in 1959. This epic narrative, based on the ancient Persian myth, depicts Arash's heroic sacrifice to liberate his country from foreign domination. Bahram Beyzai wrote Āraš, which opened in 1977, as a response to Āraš-e kamāngīr. Neither a short story nor a play, Beyzai's Āraš was staged a number of times around the world, most notably at the Annenberg Auditorium at Stanford University, in July 2013.

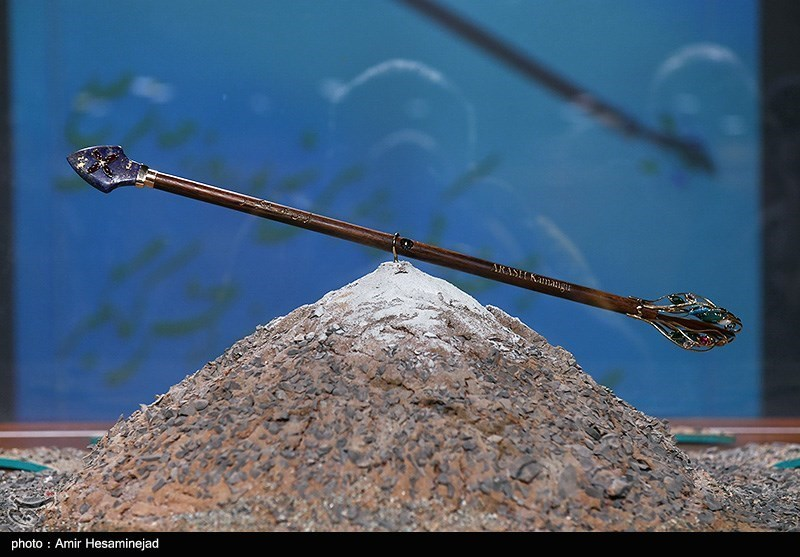
Arash Kamangir's golden arrow

== Arash Kamangir's golden arrow ==
The unveiling ceremony of Arash Kamangir's golden arrow (peace, romantic defense) was held by the Nowruz World Institute on the occasion of World Peace Day (20 September 2020). Arash Kamangir's symbolic look at an arrow adorned with gold and jewelry is in fact an artistic ideal in the form of depicting myths that are all peaceful.
