= Neslihan =

Neslihan is a Turkish feminine given name, derived from Nesil (“lineage”, “generation”) and Han (“ruler”, “leader”, lit. “khan”), that means “noble”. Notable people with the name include:

== People ==
- Neslihan Arın (born 1994), Turkish badminton player
- Neslihan Atagül (born 1992), Turkish actress
- Neslihan Çalışkan (born 1997), Turkish handball player
- Neslihan Damla Aktepe, known as Danla Bilic (born 1994), Turkish influencer
- Neslihan Demir Darnel (born 1983), Turkish volleyball player
- Neslihan Kavas (born 1987), Turkish para table tennis player
- Neslihan Muratdağı (born 1988), Turkish FIFA listed football referee
- Neslihan Okumuş (born 1994), Turkish weightlifter
- Neslihan Şenocak (born 1976), Turkish historian
- Neslihan Yakupoğlu (born 1990), Turkish handball player
- Neslihan Yeldan (born 1969), Turkish actress
- Neslihan Yiğit (born 1994), Turkish badminton player
- Neslihan (singer) (born 1983), Turkish singer

== See also ==
- MV Yasa Neslihan, a 2008 hijacked bulk cargo vessel sailing under the flag of Marshall Islands
