= Arash Motor =

British automobile company

Arash Motor Company Limited
- Formerly: Farboud Limited (2000–2008)
- Type: Private
- Industry: Automotive
- Founded: 1999; 27 years ago in Newmarket, Suffolk
- Founder: Arash Farboud
- Website: arashcars.com

Arash Motor Company Limited is a British sports car manufacturer based in Newmarket, Suffolk. It was originally established by Arash Farboud as Farboud Limited in 1999, and changed its name in 2006. The company has expanded to North America with a manufacturing facility in Bolton, Ontario, Canada.

The company has made four models to date: the AF-LM (a prototype Le Mans tribute car), the Farboud GTS (a super sports car), the AF-8 (their first supercar) and the AF-10 (a hypercar).

Currently only the AF-8 & AF-10 are in production but a new car was released in 2021.

The company is an ultra-low volume manufacturer, producing less than 3 cars per year. Sales are equally low, having sold fewer than 80 cars since commencement.

== History ==
=== Foundation and the Farboud GT (1999–2004) ===
The company grew out of Arash Farboud's intention to build a road car in the mould of the Porsche 911 GT1, after Porsche declined to sell him one of the street-legal examples of the racer that had won at Le Mans in 1998. Farboud set up the business under his own surname in 1999, and the firm was incorporated at Companies House as Farboud Limited on 27 November 2000.

Its first car, the Farboud GT, was shown at the 2002 Autosport International exhibition in Birmingham. The mid-engined coupé combined a bespoke tubular steel spaceframe with carbon fibre reinforcement and an entirely carbon fibre outer shell, which held the kerb weight to around 800 kg; motive power came from a twin-turbocharged Audi V6 credited with roughly 620 bhp. Only one example was completed, the company turning instead to a less expensive design, the GTS. That car retained the carbon bodywork and steel spaceframe of its predecessor but used a 2.7-litre twin-turbocharged Audi V6 rated at 440 hp.

=== Division of the business (2005) ===
Farboud concluded that the GTS as conceived could not be made to pay, and the project passed to Chris Marsh. Marsh had spent eleven years at Marcos, the marque co-founded by his father Jem Marsh, and had subsequently headed Invicta.

The transfer took effect in 2005, with Marsh continuing the car under a separate concern, Farbio Sports Cars, founded in that year. The new name was adopted to distance the car from its previous owner, and operations were moved to the Cotswolds, near Bath. Farboud himself withdrew from the GTS to concentrate on a supercar of his own.

=== Farbio and the sale to Ginetta (2007–2010) ===
Marsh's team retained the chassis but replaced the Audi unit with a 3.0-litre Ford Duratec V6, reworked with its own intake and exhaust to yield 262 bhp. The production Farbio GTS weighed 1,048 kg and was listed at £59,925, with a supercharged derivative of 384 bhp offered for a little over £71,000. Manufacture was established near Bath. Two further supercharged variants, the GTS350 and the GTS400, followed at the end of 2008.

In March 2010 Ginetta, based in Leeds, acquired Farbio, which had found the car difficult to build at a viable cost. The 410 bhp GTS400 was rebadged as the Ginetta F400; the purchaser departed from its usual G-prefix to acknowledge the development work already carried out. Assembly remained at the Bath premises, and Marsh stayed on as managing director. Ginetta anticipated annual sales of about fifty cars, mostly outside the United Kingdom, at a price expected to exceed £90,000.

=== Arash Motor Company (2006–present) ===
Farboud retained the original company and launched a separate marque, Arash, which he dated to 2006. The corporate change followed later: Farboud Limited was renamed Arash Motor Company Limited on 8 January 2008.

Speaking at the Dubai International Motor Show, Farboud described the venture as a pastime he was turning into a commercial undertaking, said he had funded it himself, and put the cost of developing the AF-10 at some £5 million. The prototype was designed and built at premises near Cambridge, shared with Unisurge, a family firm supplying medical packaging of which he was also chief executive. A single AF-10 had been completed at that point, with five further orders taken, and the model was to be sold in the Middle East through the distributor Ultimate Motors at $580,000.

== Models ==
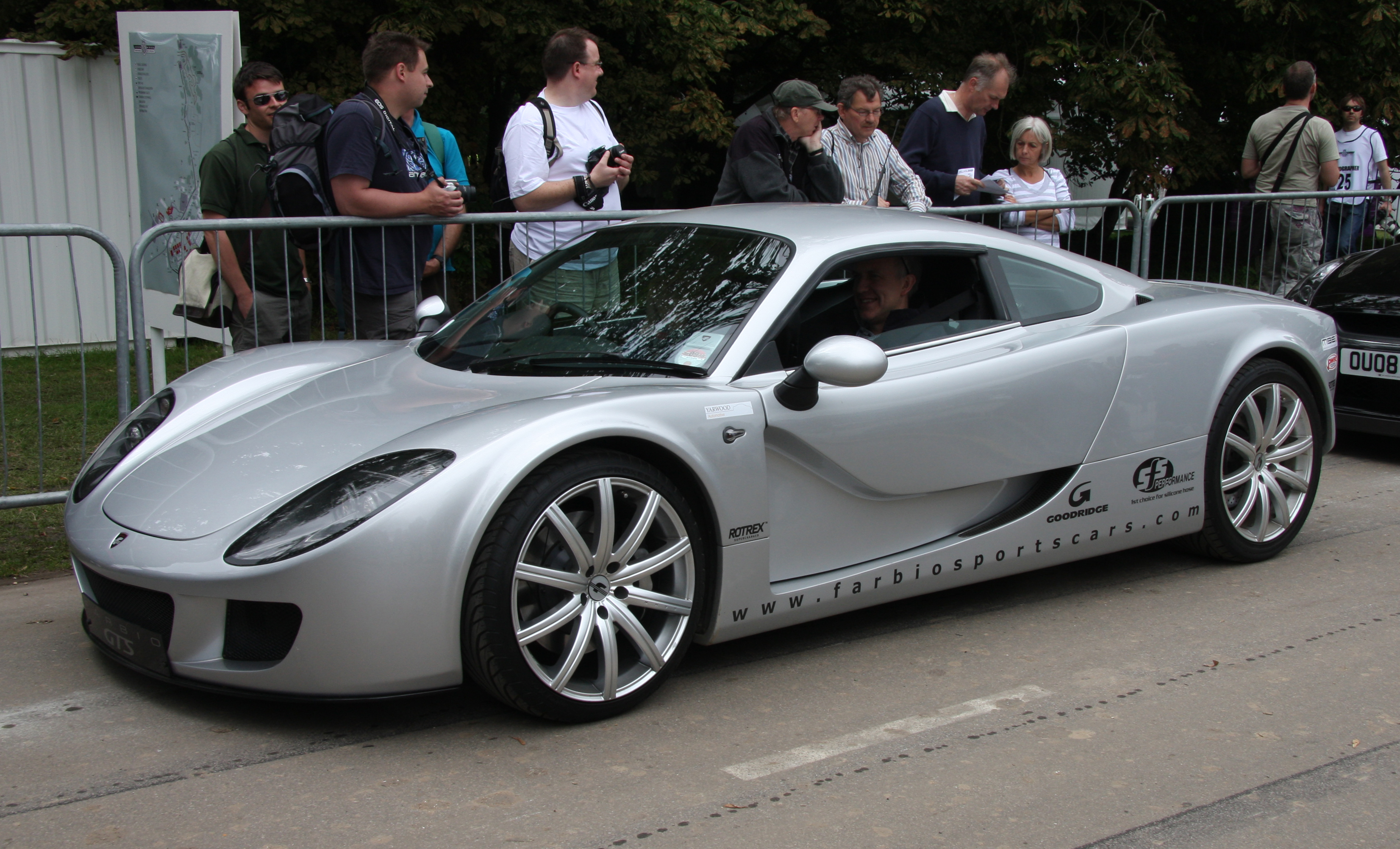
Farbio GTS, production model at the Goodwood Festival of Speed 2005

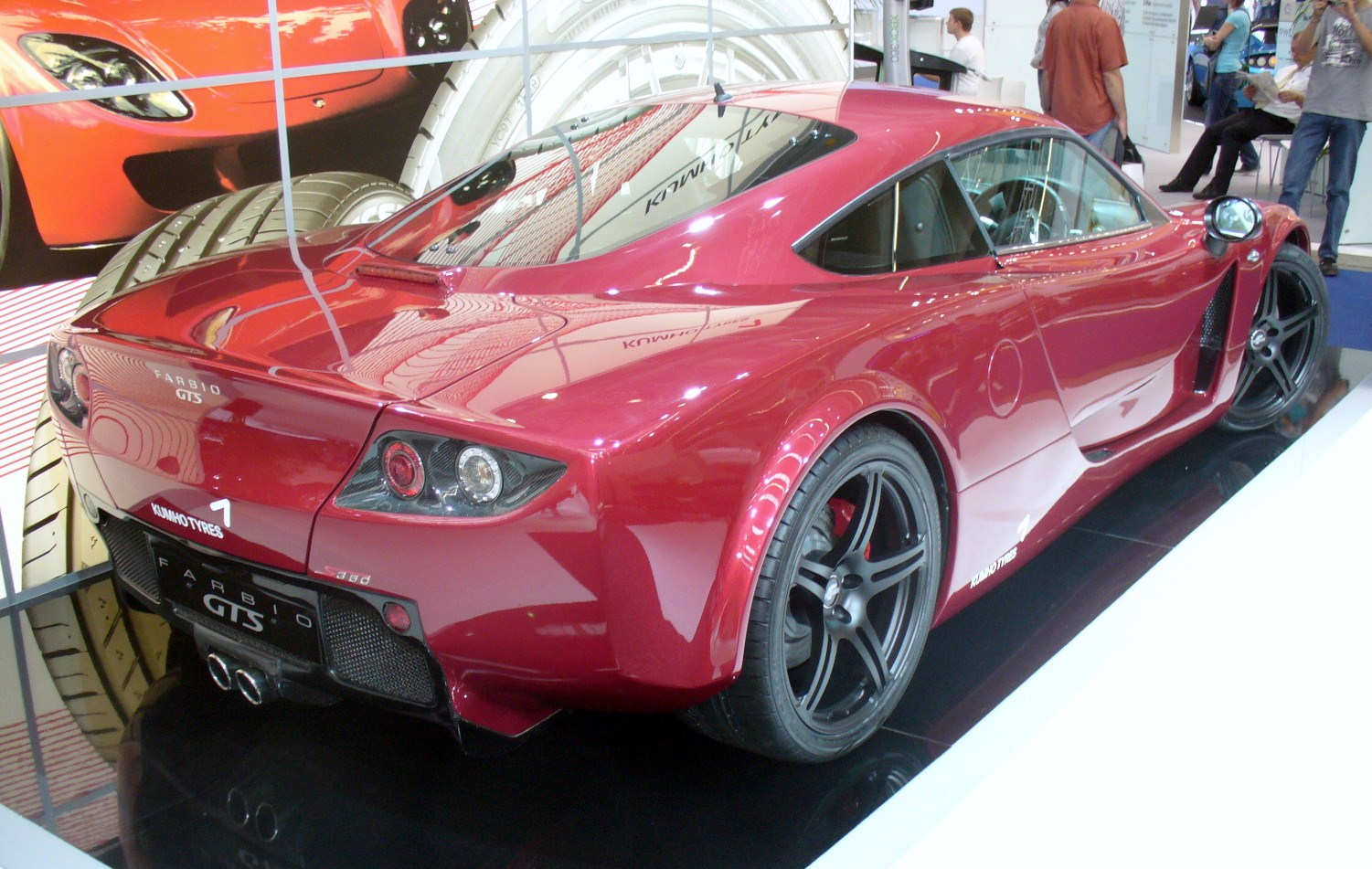
Farbio GTS 350

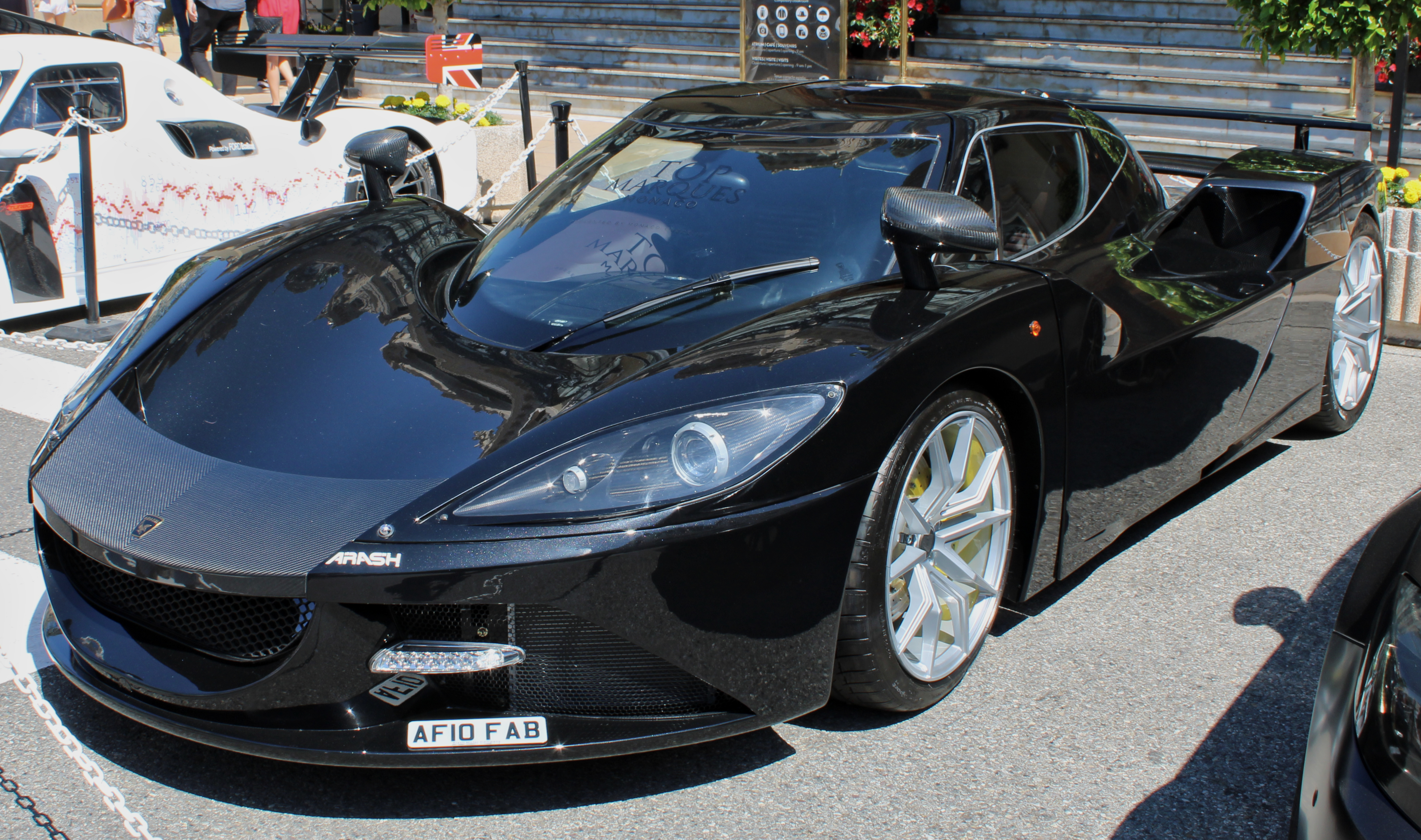
2016 Arash AF10

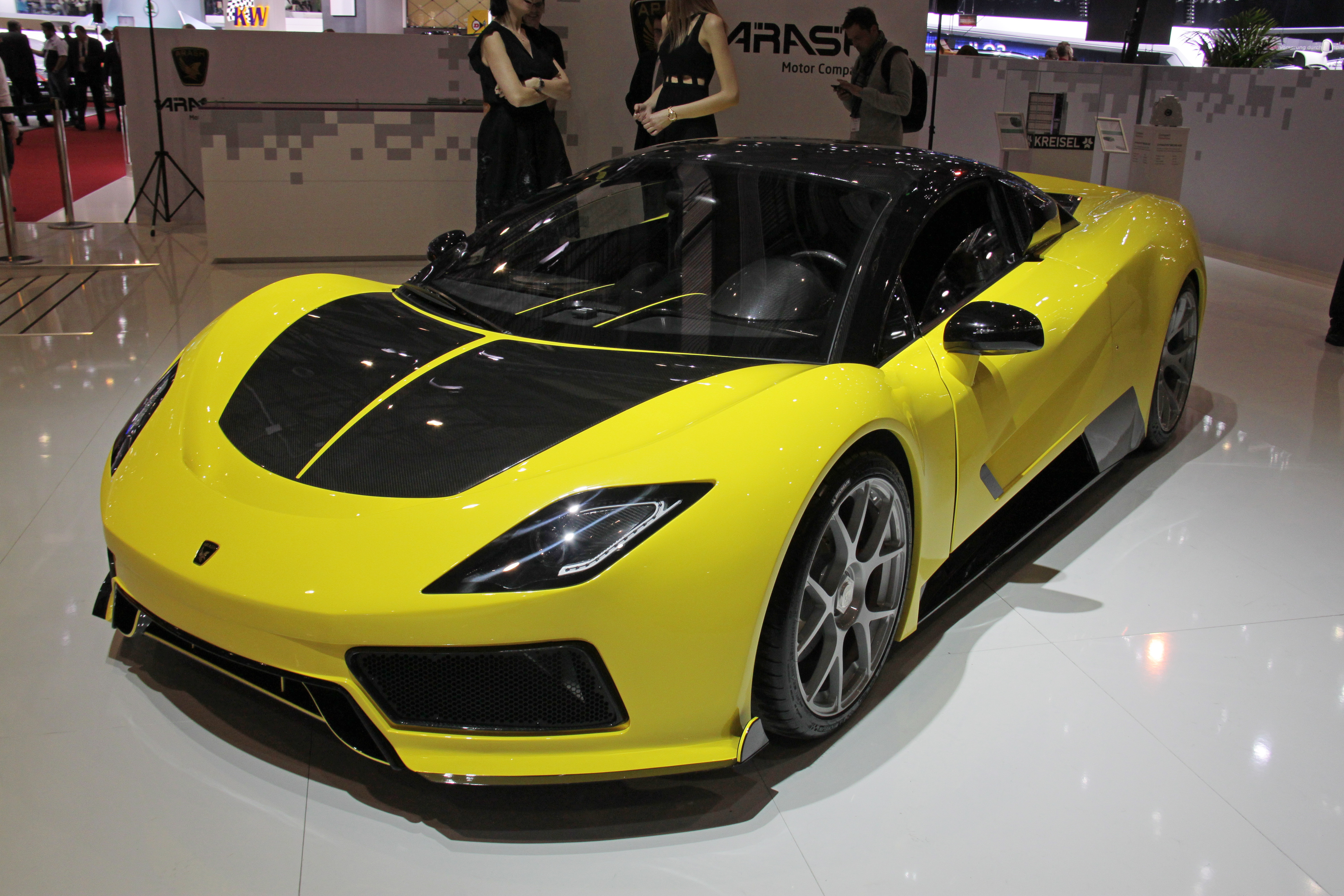
Arash AF8 Cassini at the Geneva Motor Show 2016

=== Farboud GT ===
The Farboud GT was the company's first model, announced in 2002 at the Autosport International show in Birmingham. It featured a 2.8-litre V6 twin turbo engine producing 620 bhp.

=== Farboud GTS ===
The Farboud GTS was shown as a concept car at Autosport International in 2003. Three cars were built before the design was sold to Farbio Sports Cars and production started in 2007 with the car sold as the Farbio GTS. Following the merging of Farbio with Ginetta, the GTS was further developed as the Ginetta F400.

=== Arash AF10 ===
In 2009, Arash displayed the AF10, which had a Chevrolet Corvette-sourced 7.0-litre V8 engine producing at least 500 bhp. The car was not put into production, but Arash later revealed a revised model in 2016 with a hybrid drivetrain and a horsepower claim of 2,080 hp.

=== Arash AF8 ===
The AF8 was designed by Arash and revealed at the Geneva Motor Show 2016. It had a carbon/steel tubed chassis and a mid-engined 7.0-litre V8 engine producing 505 bhp. It later went up the hill at the Goodwood Festival of Speed in 2015 and 2016.

== In Video Games ==
The AF10 and AF8 Falcon Edition appear in the video games Asphalt 8: Airborne and Asphalt 9: Legends and Driving Empire (Roblox).

== See also ==
- Automotive industry in the United Kingdom
- List of car manufacturers of the United Kingdom
- List of automobiles manufactured in Ontario
