= Ceyda Aslı Kılıçkıran =

Turkish screenwriter and film director

Ceyda Asli Kılıçkıran
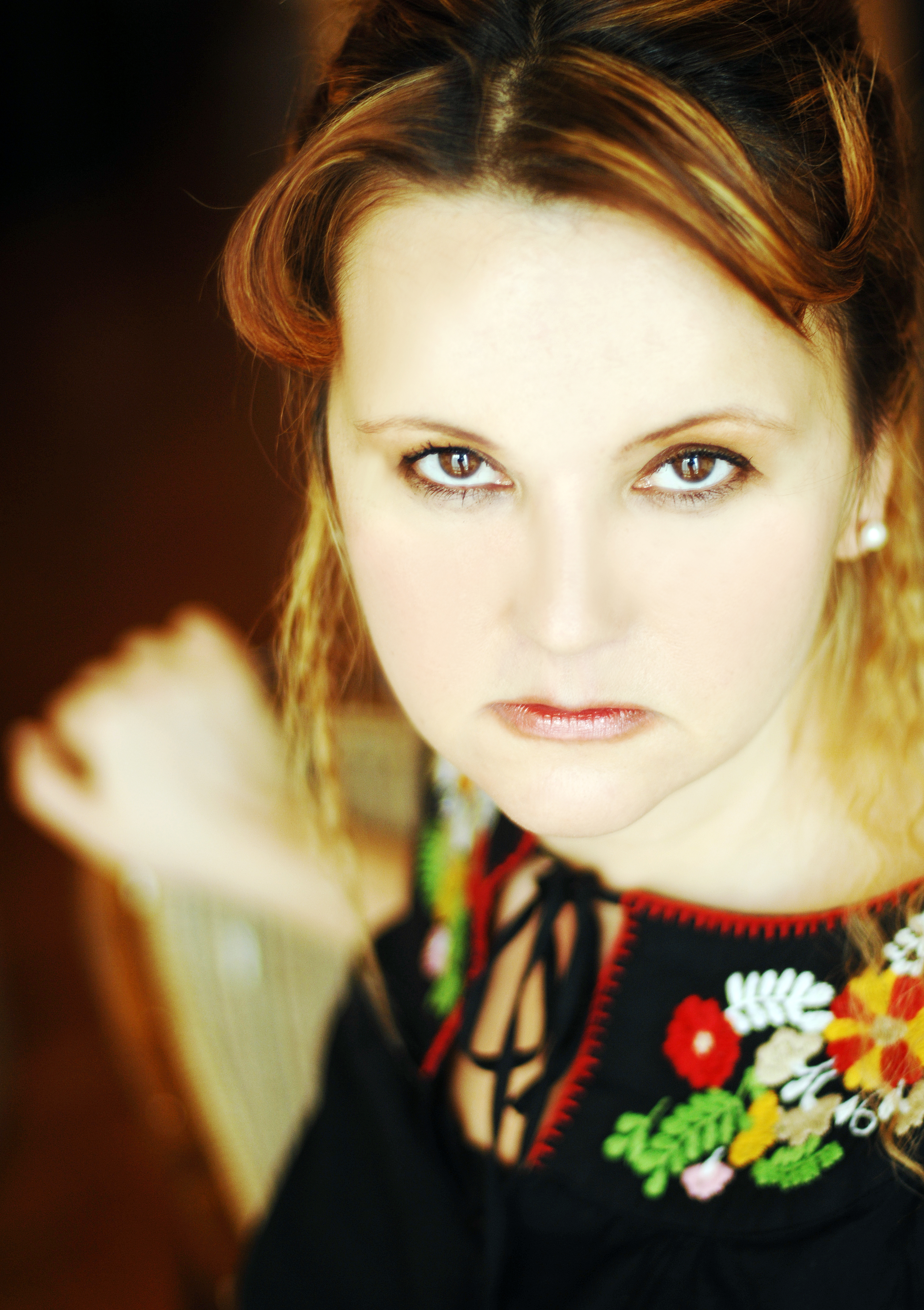
- Ceyda Asli Kılıçkıran
- Born: February 16, 1968 (age 58); İzmir, Turkey
- Education: English literature and Philology
- Alma mater: Istanbul University
- Occupations: Screenwriter, film director

Ceyda Aslı Kılıçkıran (born February 16, 1968) is a Turkish female screenwriter and film director.

== Biography ==
She was born on February 16, 1968, in İzmir, where her father was working as a director and producer for the Turkish Radio and Television Corporation (TRT). After finishing the high school, she studied English literature and Philology at Istanbul University graduating in 1993.

Kılıçkıran worked as a writer for foreign papers including Daily News and Middle East Journal before she became editor-in-chief of the CIDC Insight. She then wrote scripts for commercials. After she realized that something was missing in the concept she decided to shoot the films of her own script. She says "Literature trained my writing skills and my perspective toward life. And [for me] writing is the main and most important process of a visual creative work. I think the best films come when the writer and the director are the same person."

Ceyda Aslı Kılıçkıran is one of very few female directors not only from Turkey but also from the Middle East. She is the only Turkish director working on films concerning women, spiritualism and realization. Her work focuses on the identity, equality and liberty of Muslim women and women worldwide. She writes stories within a framework of a spiritual knowledge and uses these spiritual and metaphysical elements in her stories to give peace and humanity messages through knowledge to make her metaphors more effective.

In 2007, she wrote and directed Geçerken Uğradım (Whilst on My Way), a film about the life of a modern woman portrayed by the famous Turkish actress Hale Soygazi. It is dedicated to Duygu Asena (1946–2006), journalist, best-selling author and activist for women’s rights.

Her 2007-film Kilit (The Lock) featuring the life of Afife Jale (1902–1941), best known as the first Muslim theatre actress in Turkey, was awarded a prize by the Foundation of Women's Works and Library in 2008. She received an offer from American film director and producer Robert Richter to produce a documentary film about the life of Muslim women in the Middle East.

== Filmography ==
- Bağımsızlığımı ve Seni Seviyorum
- A Patch of Freedom - 2003
- Su Yolu (Watermark) - 2005
- Geçerken Uğradım (Whilst on My Way) - 2007
- Kilit (The Lock) - 2007
- The Transition - 2011 (Documentary)
