= Arash Asli =

Canadian businessman

Arash Asli is a Canadian businessman, the CEO and co-founder of Yocale.

Before Yocale, he was at Aptean as Executive Vice President of Business Solutions & Strategic Alliances. He also grew the company's largest global division to profitability and held roles including EVP Professional Services, Worldwide VP of CRM, and VP Sales Consulting. He spans many industries including financial services, manufacturing, healthcare, and real estate.

== Education and certification ==
Asli studied engineering in his early years at Simon Fraser University in Vancouver, British Columbia. He graduated with Masters in Business Administration specialized in Executive Management from Royal Roads University in Victoria, BC.

He is also a Certified Management Consultant (CMC) and is recognized by the international Council of Management Consulting Institute (ICMCI).

== Yocale ==
Asli co-founded Yocale in 2013 with 5 of his peers. Since then, they have built Yocale around a concept of building local communities and creating a network of industries to support one another.

== In the news ==
Asli has also been featured in several publications. Most notably, in 2013 was profiled by Business in Vancouver as passionate and "completely different". He is also a prominent member of the Young Entrepreneurs Council, as well as the Forbes Technology Council, and has contributed to The Huffington Post, Inc., and Forbes among others.
