= Nazi songs =

Songs created or used by the Nazi Party

Nazi songs are songs and marches created or used by the Nazi Party. In modern Germany, the public singing or performing of songs exclusively associated with the Nazi Party is now illegal.

== Background ==
There is often confusion between songs written specifically for the Nazi Party, and much older German patriotic songs (from before World War I) that were used extensively by the Nazis and have become associated with them. This observation applies above all to "Das Lied der Deutschen" ("The song of the Germans"), written in 1841. It became the national anthem of the Weimar Republic in 1922, but during the Nazi era, only the first stanza was used, followed by the SA song "Horst-Wessel-Lied".

In modern Germany, the public singing or performing of songs identified exclusively with Nazi Germany is illegal. It can be punished with up to three years of imprisonment.

== Sturmabteilung (SA) songs ==
Many pre-1933 SA songs were based on older German folk melodies, but there were also instances in which SA combat songs copied the melodies of rival Red Front Fighters songs, which were in turn based on Russian marches. An example of this is the fascist song Brüder in Zechen und Gruben ("Brothers in mines and pits"), which copied the melody of the communist Brüder, zur Sonne, zur Freiheit ("Brothers, to the sun, to freedom"), whose melody, in turn, belonged to the march Смело, товарищи, в ногу/Smelo, tovarishchi, v nogu ("Comrades, let's bravely march"), which was written in 1895/6 by Leonid Radin in Moscow's Taganka Prison.

=== Horst Wessel Lied ===
A 1933 performance of the "Horst Wessel Lied" by the Grosses Blas-Orchester und Chor, conducted by Carl Woitschach

The "Horst-Wessel-Lied" (lit. 'Horst Wessel['s] Song'), also known as "Die Fahne Hoch" (lit. 'The Flag High'), was the official anthem of the NSDAP. The song was written by Horst Wessel, a party activist and SA leader, who was killed by a member of the Communist Party of Germany. After his death, he was proclaimed a "martyr" by the NSDAP, and his song gained widespread popularity among Nazi Party followers.

Public performances of the song are currently forbidden in Germany (StGB §86a) and Austria (Verbotsgesetz 1947), a ban that includes both the lyrics and the melody, which are only permitted for educational purposes.

=== Kampflied der Nationalsozialisten ===
Kampflied der Nationalsozialisten ("Battle Song of the National Socialists"), also known by its opening line Wir Sind Das Heer Vom Hakenkreuz ("We Are the Army of the Swastika"), was an early Nazi hymn. Its lyrics were written by Kleo Pleyer, while the melody was essentially based on that of the traditional German folk song Stimmt an mit hellem hohen klang, which was composed in 1811 by Albert Methfessel. Later on, the verses of Das Berliner Jungarbeiterlied (with the opening line Herbei zum Kampf, ihr Knechte der Maschinen) were added to the song. Das Berliner Jungarbeiterlied was set to the melody of the "Air March" (the official march of the Soviet Air Force), which was composed in 1921 by Yuliy Abramovich Khayt. During the Nazi era, the song was performed by Carl Woitschach's orchestra in its full version, incorporating both melodies, as Kampflied der Nationalsozialisten/Herbei zum Kampf.

=== Die Hitlerleute (Kameraden Laßt Erschallen) ===
Kameraden Laßt Erschallen ("Comrades Let it Resound") was a Sturmabteilung arrangement of the Kaiserjägerlied written by Karl Mühlberger in 1924. The author of the lyrics of Die Hitlerleute was Horst Wessel himself, and the song originated from his unit, the Sturm 67/5 (Sturm 67, Standarte 5) of the Berlin Sturmabteilung, also known as the Sturm "Horst Wessel", named in honor of Horst Wessel, also known by its old name before Horst Wessel's death, "The Hitlerleute". The first recording of the song was published by the company Electrola around the early 1930s.

=== Auf, Hitlerleute, schließt die Reihen (Hitlernationale) ===
The Nazis were not reticent in employing songs and melodies previously associated wholly with socialists and communists in their quest to broaden their appeal to the working class, and the Internationale was a prime target. By 1930, a Nazi version of this working-class standard was in circulation, entitled the Hitlernationale:

Appropriating working-class songs such as the Internationale for their own political ends had a direct effect on the streets, as the Nazi composer Hans Bajer noted when giving this account of a march by the SA into working-class district of north Berlin one Sunday afternoon in 1930:

When the storm troopers broke into song, singing the Hitlernationale, residents threw open their windows, misled momentarily by the familiar tune. Realizing quickly that Nazis were trying to appropriate the melody of their revolutionary anthem, the socialist residents countered by singing the refrain from the original text Völker hört die Signale! Auf zum letzten Gefecht ("Comrades, listen to the Signal! Onward, to the final battle!"), while others pelted the storm troopers with bits of debris. Police promptly moved in to prevent serious trouble.

Auf, Hitlerleute, schließt die Reihen, Zum Rassenkampf sind wir bereit. Mit unserem Blut wollen wir das Banner weihen, Zum Zeichen einer neuen Zeit. Auf rotem Grund im weiβen Felde, Weht unser schwarzes Hakenkreuz. Schon jubeln Siegesignale, Schon bricht der Morgen hell herein. Der nationale Sozialismus Wird Deutschlands Zukunft sein.	Arise Hitler men, close ranks, We are ready for the racial struggle. With our blood we consecrate the banner, The symbol of a new era. On its red and white background, Shines our black swastika bright. Victory sounds are heard all over, As the morning light breaks through; National Socialism Is the future of Germany.

Bajer’s account proves once more that song played a central role in the battle for control of the streets. No recorded version of the song survives today, only the lyrics.

=== Hitlerleute ("Hitler's people") ===
That song had the same tune of the Italian fascist anthem Giovinezza.

This is not to be confused with Die Hitlerleute, more commonly referred to as Kameraden Laßt Erschallen, which is a completely different song.

== SS marschiert in Feindesland ==
SS marschiert in Feindesland ("SS marches in enemy territory") also known as Teufelslied ("The Devil's Song") was a marching song of the Waffen-SS during the German-Soviet War. The music for this song came from the Lied der Legion Condor ("Song of the Condor Legion"), whose lyrics and music were written by Wolfram Philipps and Christian Jährig, two Condor Legion pilots with the rank of Oberleutnant. The somber music has a minor character, and the song was "exposed to the accusation of being un-German, Russian or Bolshevik". In 1939, the Lied der Legion Condor was incorporated into a march named Marsch/Parademarsch der Legion Condor after an instrumental intro was composed by Stabsmusikmeister Karl Bögelsack. This march has two parts: the first (major) part is the instrumental intro composed by Karl Bögelsack, and the second part (trio) is the Lied der Legion Condor, which was composed/written by Wolfram Philipps and Christian Jährig. A marching song with the same melody as the Lied der Legion Condor was adopted by the Charlemagne French SS Division, the Estonian SS Division, the Latvian Legion and the Norwegian Legion during the war. A song with a similar melody, Dragões do Ar ("Dragons of the Air"), was adopted by the Paratroopers Brigade (Brazil).

In 2015, Stefan Gotschacher, press secretary of the right-wing populist and national-conservative FPÖ political party in Austria, was fired after posting the lyrics of SS marschiert in Feindesland on his Facebook page.

== Es zittern die morschen Knochen ==
Es zittern die morschen Knochen ("The Rotten Bones Are Trembling") by Hans Baumann was, after the Horst-Wessel-Lied, one of the most famous Nazi songs and the official song of the Hitler Youth.

The original song's refrain (1932) was Denn heute gehört uns Deutschland / und morgen die ganze Welt ("For today, Germany is ours / and tomorrow the whole world"). In a later version (1937) this was mitigated for the Hitler Youth to Denn heute da hört uns Deutschland... ("For today, Germany hears us...").

== Vorwärts! Vorwärts! ==
Vorwärts! Vorwärts! Schmettern die hellen Fanfaren ("Forward! Forward! Blare the Bright Fanfares") (Note: The song also goes by the names Uns're Fahne Flattert uns Voran, alternatively Unsere Fahne Flattert uns Voran (Our flag flutters before us) and Fahnelied (Banner Song).) was a Hitler Youth marching song. The text of the song, published in 1933, comes from Baldur von Schirach and is based on a melody by UFA composer Hans-Otto Borgmann.

Vorwärts! Vorwärts! was first performed in the 1933 propaganda film Hitlerjunge Quex. Motifs from the song are used throughout the film, underlying representations of the Hitler Youth, in contrast to The Internationale and jazz motifs in scenes from a socialist "commune".

== Erika ==
Erika was a marching song used by the German military. The song was composed by Herms Niel in the 1930s, and it soon came into usage by the Wehrmacht, especially the Heer. No other marching song during World War II reached the popularity of Erika.

== Panzerlied ==
Panzerlied ("Tank song") was a German military march of the Wehrmacht armored troops (Panzerwaffe), composed in 1933. The NSKK (Nationalsozialistisches Kraftfahrkorps) also made their own take on the Panzerlied, but with a different variation called the Panzerwagenlied ("Armored car song"). In 2017, the Bundeswehr was banned from publishing songbooks containing Panzerlied and other marching songs by the Minister of Defence Ursula von der Leyen as part of new efforts at denazification.

== See also ==
- Erzherzog-Albrecht-Marsch
- Es war ein Edelweiss
- Herms Niel, composer of military songs and marches
- Hindutva pop
- Sturmlied
- Volk ans Gewehr
