= Edelweiss (song) =

Song from The Sound of Music

Song
- Published: 1959
- Genre: Show tune; acoustic
- Composer: Richard Rodgers
- Lyricist: Oscar Hammerstein II

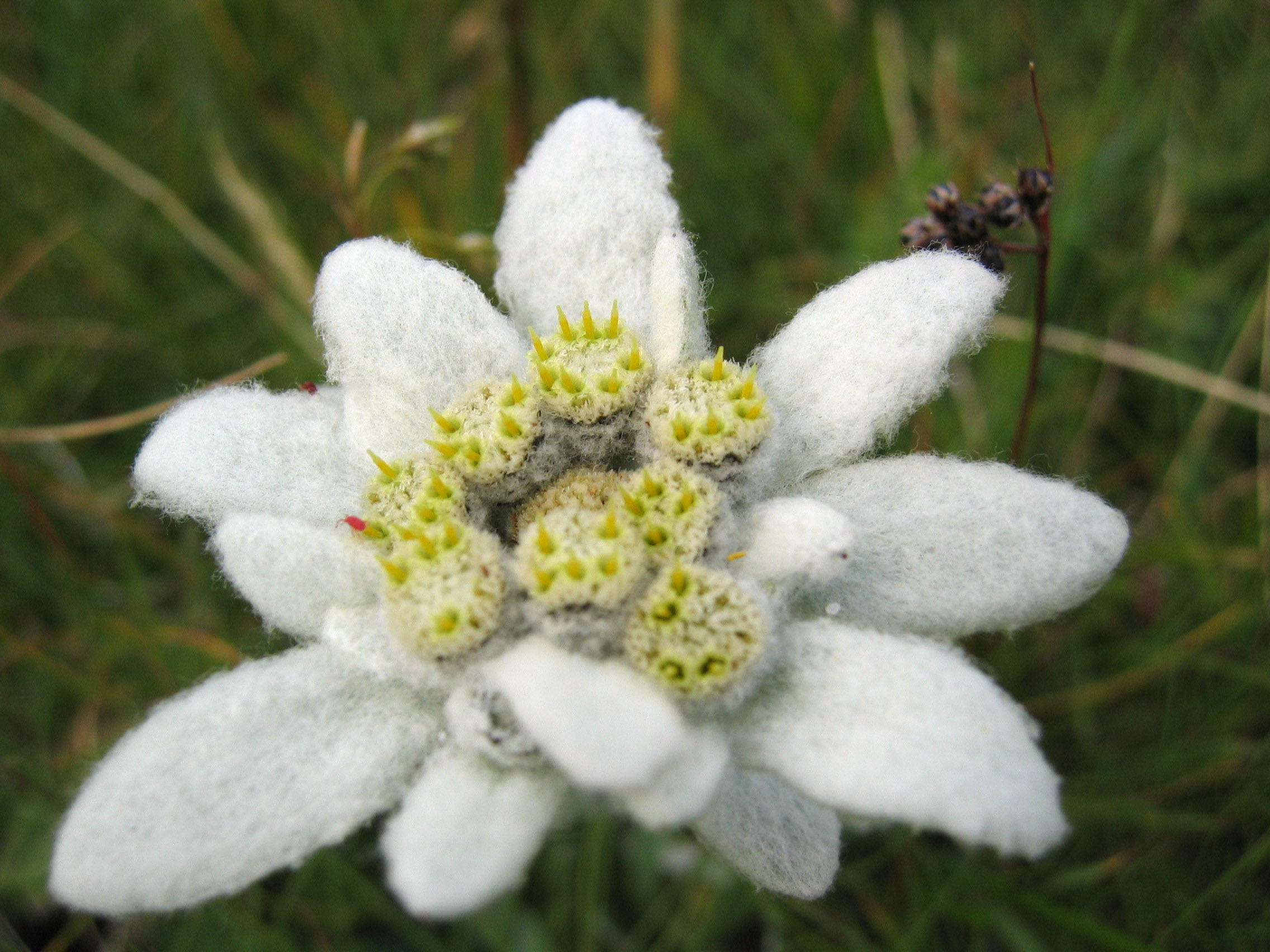
Edelweiss flower, Leontopodium alpinum

"Edelweiss" is a show tune from the 1959 Rodgers and Hammerstein musical The Sound of Music. It is named after the edelweiss (Leontopodium nivale), a white flower found high in the Alps. The song was created for the 1959 Broadway production of The Sound of Music, as a song for the character Captain Georg von Trapp. In the stage musical and its 1965 film adaptation, Captain von Trapp and his family sing this song during the concert near the end of Act II, as well as a statement of Austrian patriotism in the face of the pressure put upon him to join the navy of Nazi Germany following the Anschluss (German annexation of Austria). It is also Captain von Trapp's subliminal goodbye to his beloved homeland, using the flower as a symbol of his loyalty to Austria. In the film version, the song is additionally sung by the Captain earlier in the film when he rediscovers music with his children.

This was the final song of Rodgers and Hammerstein's musical collaboration as well as the last lyric written by Oscar Hammerstein II, who died in August 1960.

== Writing ==
While The Sound of Music was in tryouts in Boston, Richard Rodgers felt Captain von Trapp should have a song with which he would bid farewell to the Austria he knew and loved. Rodgers and Oscar Hammerstein II decided to write an extra song that von Trapp would sing in the festival concert sequence towards the end of the show. As they were writing it, they remembered that Theodore Bikel, who had been cast as Captain von Trapp, was also a guitar-playing folksinger. They felt he could display that talent when performing the song. The Lindsay and Crouse script provides the metaphor of the simple edelweiss wildflower (Leontopodium nivale) as a symbol of the Austria that Captain von Trapp, Maria, and their children knew would live on in their hearts, despite the German annexation of Austria. The metaphor of this song builds on an earlier scene when Gretl presents a bouquet of edelweiss flowers to Elsa Schräder, during the latter's visit to the von Trapp household.

Rodgers provided a simple waltz-time melody, to the simple Italian style ritornello lyric that Hammerstein wrote about the appearance of the edelweiss flower. "Edelweiss" turned out to be a beloved song in the musical, as well as one of the best-loved songs by Rodgers and Hammerstein.

"Edelweiss" is the last song Rodgers and Hammerstein wrote together; Hammerstein was already suffering from stomach cancer, and he died of the illness nine months after The Sound of Music opened on Broadway.

== Film adaptation ==
Although the stage production uses the song only during the concert scene, Ernest Lehman's screenplay for the film adaptation uses the song twice. In a new scene created for the film, inspired by a line in the original script by Howard Lindsay and Russel Crouse, Captain von Trapp sings "Edelweiss" to his children in their family drawing room, with his eldest daughter, Liesl, singing along briefly. Lehman also expanded the scope of the song when it was sung in the Salzburg Festival concert scene, so that Captain von Trapp calls on the audience to join in the song with him and his family, in defiance of the German soldiers posted around the arena.

Christopher Plummer played the part of Captain von Trapp in the film adaptation. However, his singing was overdubbed with the voice of Bill Lee despite Plummer recording the song himself.

An instrumental waltz version of the song is also played at the party while Maria secretly leaves the house for the abbey at the end of the film’s first half.

== Austrian attitudes ==
The edelweiss is a popular flower in Austria and was featured on the old Austrian 1 schilling coin. It can also now be seen on the 2 cent Euro coin. The flower is protected in Austria and illegal to pick. An "edelweiss" is also worn as a cap emblem by certain Austrian Army and since WWI the German Gebirgsjäger (mountain troopers) to include units stationed today in the nearby Bavarian Alps.

In the original run, the musical The Sound of Music was treated with disdain by Austrians, and the song "Edelweiss" has been singled out for criticism. When US President Ronald Reagan quoted the song in 1984 to toast Austrian President Rudolf Kirchschläger, Austrian newspapers complained that the song was full of clichés and called it "kitsch." When the musical premiered on the national stage in Vienna in 2005, one critic called it "boring" and another referred to "Edelweiss" as "an insult to Austrian musical creation." However, attitudes have improved as film tourism became a bigger attraction than Salzburg's attraction for being the birthplace of Wolfgang Amadeus Mozart. When the musical premiered in Salzburg in 2011, most performances were sold out.

== Misconceptions ==
Perceived authenticity of the song has led to a misconception that it is an Austrian folk song or a national anthem rather than a work composed for the entertainment world. In fact, Austria's current official anthem is Land der Berge, Land am Strome. Further, the former anthem, from 1929 until the Anschluss was Sei gesegnet ohne Ende (associated with the Federal State of Austria, when the story begins).

Alyson McLamore, in her book Musical Theater: An Appreciation wrote, "The last song to be written for the show was 'Edelweiss,' a tender little homage to a native flower of Austria that has the effect of authentic Austrian folksong." Hugh Fordin, in his biography of Oscar Hammerstein, wrote "'Edelweiss' was widely believed to be an old Austrian song, though Oscar … composed it for the Sound of Music." Theodore Bikel wrote that he was approached by a native Austrian who said, "I love that Edelweiss" and then added, with total confidence, "Of course, I have known it for a long time, but only in German".

A misconception about the song is that it was a Nazi anthem, but it was not written until long after Nazi Germany was vanquished. A different song, titled Es war ein Edelweiss, was, however, composed by Herms Niel for the German Army in 1941.

== Legal problems ==
The estates of Rodgers and Hammerstein have not authorized the use of alternative lyrics with the melody of the song, making certain commercial uses of those versions potentially infringing if they do not fall under fair use. Rodgers stated that "he would take legal action against any group" using the "Edelweiss" melody with altered words; the current rightsholders comply with his wishes, refusing to grant permission for these commercial requests, which are "inconsistent with the creators' intentions".

== Other versions ==
- English singer Vince Hill reached #2 in the UK Singles Chart in 1967 with his cover version of the track.
- Josephine Siao (蕭芳芳) performed a Chinese (Cantonese) version in the 1967 movie Lightning Killer (閃電煞星).
- In 2013, American country singer Carrie Underwood and English actor Stephen Moyer, along with Ariane Rinehart, Michael Nigro, Ella Watts-Gorman, Joe West, Sophia Caruso, Grace Rundhaug and Peyton Ella, would perform the song in The Sound of Music Live! and would do a studio recording of the song for the soundtrack.
- A performance by Jeanette Olsson is used in the opening sequence of the 2015 Amazon series The Man in the High Castle.
- American singer Leslie Odom Jr. covers the song with his wife Nicolette Robinson on his "Simply Christmas" album.
- The song was performed many times in China to welcome visiting U.S. officials, as after China's reform and opening up in 1978, it was selected for inclusion in music textbooks and widely taught throughout the country, becoming one of the best-known English-language songs in China.
