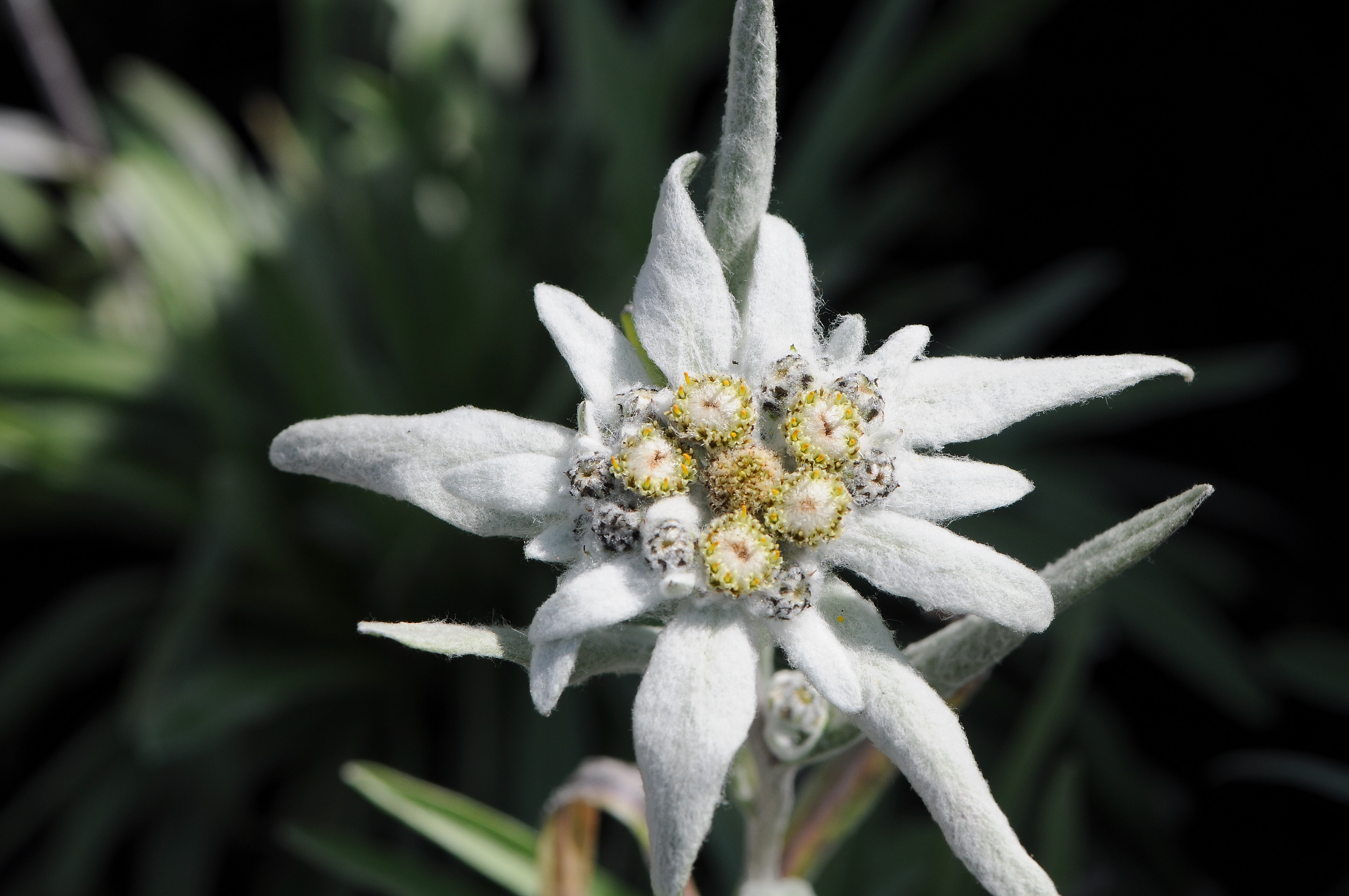

Conservation status
- Least Concern (IUCN 3.1)

Scientific classification
- Kingdom: Plantae
- Clade: Tracheophytes
- Clade: Angiosperms
- Clade: Eudicots
- Clade: Asterids
- Order: Asterales
- Family: Asteraceae
- Genus: Leontopodium
- Species: L. nivale

Binomial name
- Leontopodium nivale (Ten.) Huet ex Hand.-Mazz.c

Synonyms
- Leontopodium alpinum Colm. ex Cass.

= Edelweiss =

Species of plant

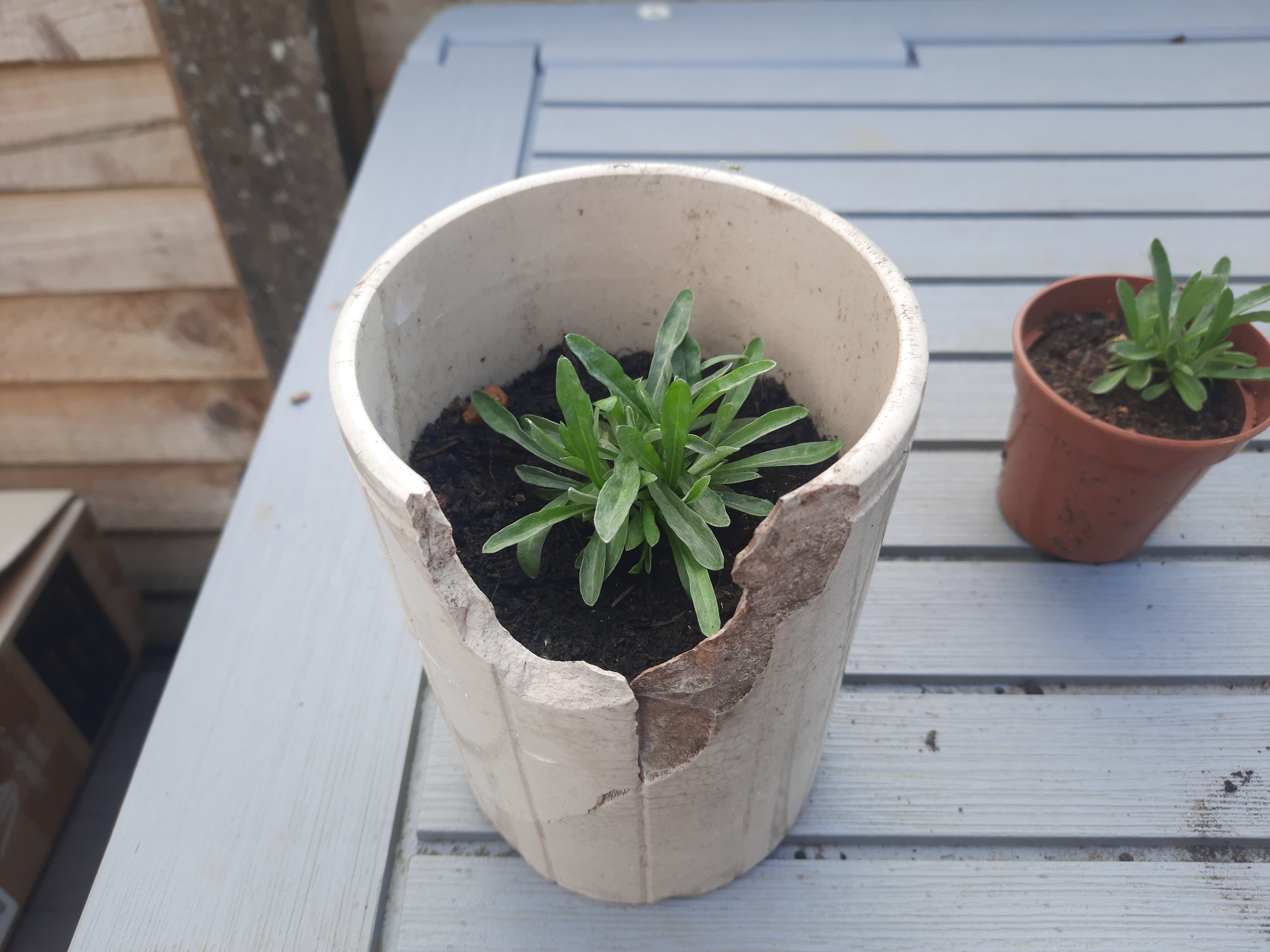
An edelweiss in an early state of development inside of a plant pot (note that the white velvet-like hair hasn't yet fully grown upon its leaves yet.)

Leontopodium nivale, commonly called edelweiss (lit. 'noble white') (English: /ˈeɪdəlvaɪs/ AY-dəl-vyss; German: Edelweiß [ˈeːdl̩vaɪs] or Alpen-Edelweiß), is a mountain flower belonging to the daisy or sunflower family Asteraceae. The plant prefers rocky limestone places at about 1,800–3,400 metres (5,900–11,200 ft) altitude. It is a non-toxic plant. Its leaves and flowers are covered with dense hairs, which appear to protect the plant from cold, aridity, and ultraviolet radiation. The filamentary wool (tomentum) has sub-micrometer internal structure that contributes to scattering and absorption of near-ultraviolet radiation, which is interpreted as an adaptive trait for high-altitude UV exposure. It is a scarce, short-lived flower found in remote mountain areas and has been used as a symbol for alpinism, for rugged beauty and purity associated with the Alps and Carpathians. It is a national symbol of several countries, specifically Bulgaria, Austria, Slovenia, Switzerland, and Italy. In Romania it was declared a "monument of nature" in 1931. Edelweiss Day is celebrated on the 5th of March. According to folk tradition, giving this flower to a loved one is a promise of dedication.

== Names ==
The flower's common name Edelweiß is German (and Edelwyss or Alpe-Edelwyss in Alemannic German), and is a compound of edel "noble" and weiß "white". The Slovene name is planika, meaning mountain girl. In Romanian, it is known as floare de colț, which means "cliff flower". The flower is referred to as stella alpina in the Italian-speaking Alps and étoile des Alpes in the French Alps, meaning "star of the Alps".

Edelweiß was one of several regional names for the plant and achieved wide usage during the first half of the 19th century in the context of early Alpine tourism. Alternative names include Chatzen-Talpen ("cat's paws") and the older Wullbluomen ("wool flower," attested in Early New High German in the 16th century).

The scientific name Leontopodium is a latinisation of the Ancient Greek leontopódion (λεοντοπόδιον), "lion's paw" (Modern Greek borrows the German word). The Latin specific epithet nivale means "snow" or "snowy".

== Taxonomy ==
Since 1822, Leontopodium has no longer been considered part of the genus Gnaphalium, but classified alongside it as a distinct genus within the tribe Gnaphalieae. In 2003, Leontopodium alpinum was re-classified as a subspecies of Leontopodium nivale (publication in Willdenowia 2003). The World Flora Online and subsequent taxonomic resources reflect this subspecific treatment: Leontopodium nivale subsp. alpinum (Cass.) Greuter and Leontopodium nivale subsp. nivale.

== Description ==
The plant's leaves and flowers are covered with white hairs, and appear woolly (tomentose). Flowering stalks of edelweiss can grow to a size of 3–20 centimetres (1–8 in) in the wild, or, up to 40 cm (16 in) in cultivation. Each bloom consists of five to six small yellow clustered spikelet-florets (5 mm, 3/16 in) surrounded by fuzzy white "petals" (technically, bracts) in a double-star formation. The flowers bloom between July and September.

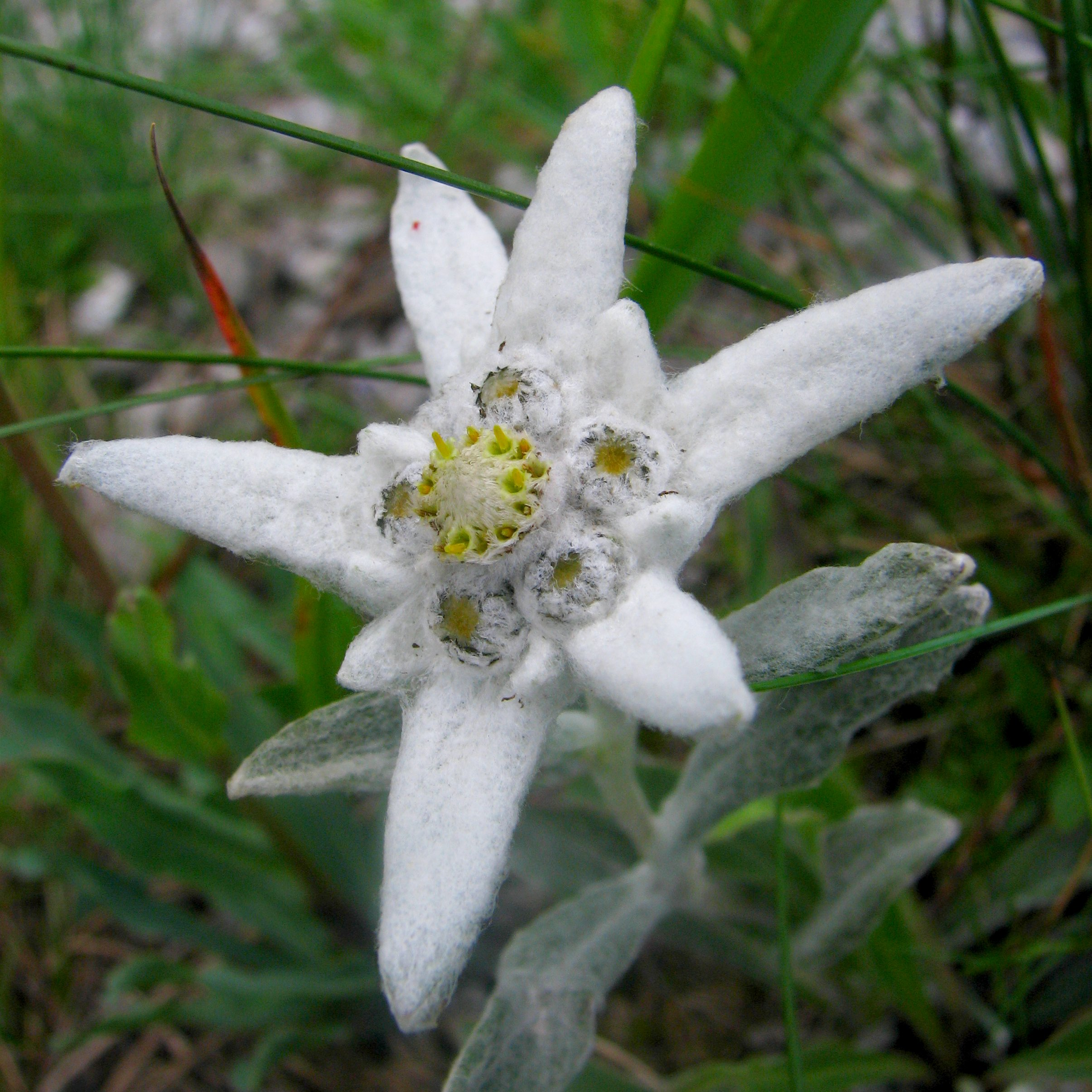
Early-season version with central floret-pods not yet fully developed. Specimen found in Poland's Tatra Mountains.

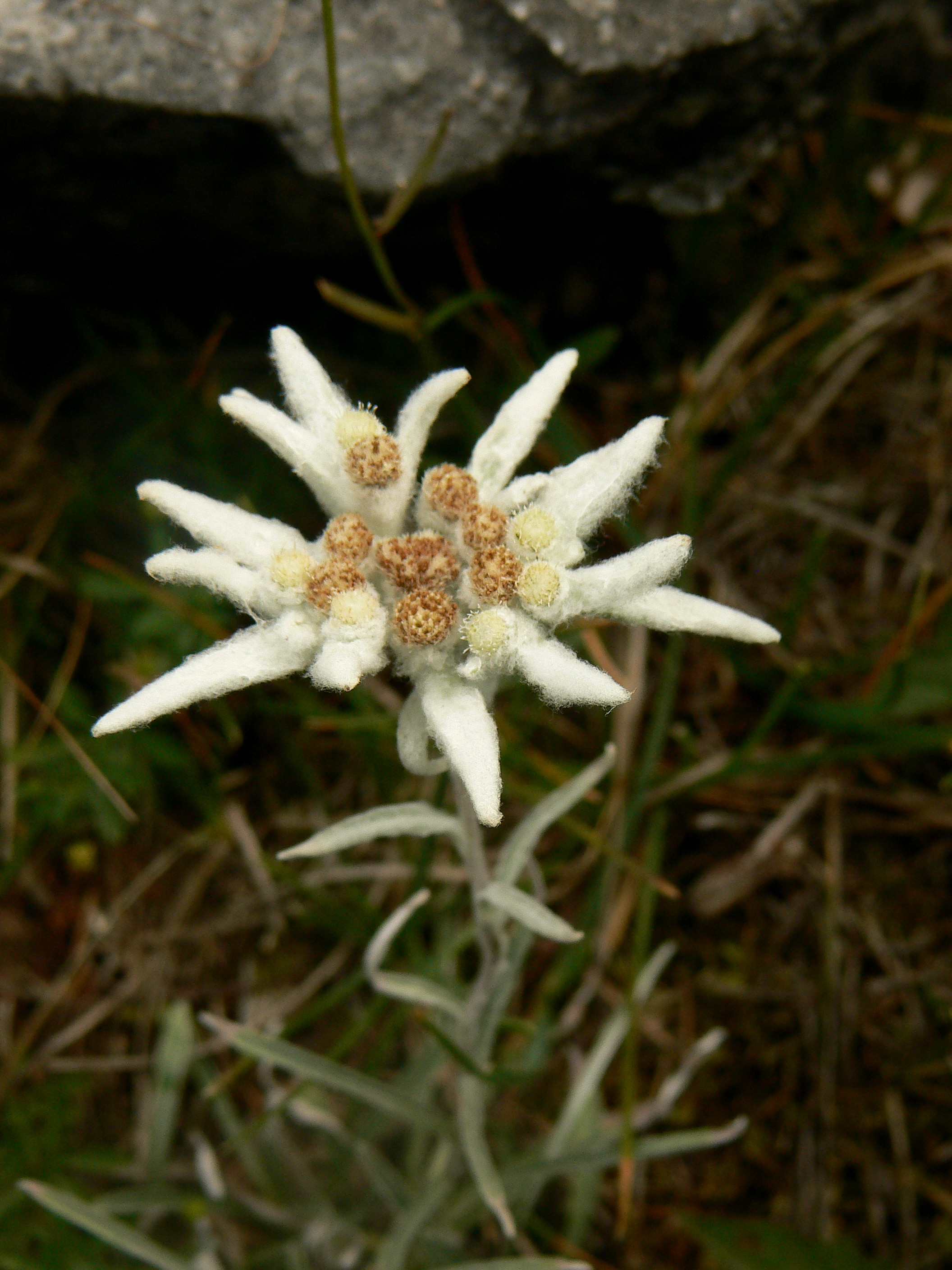
Typical mid-season appearance. Specimen found in Italy's Bergamo Alps.

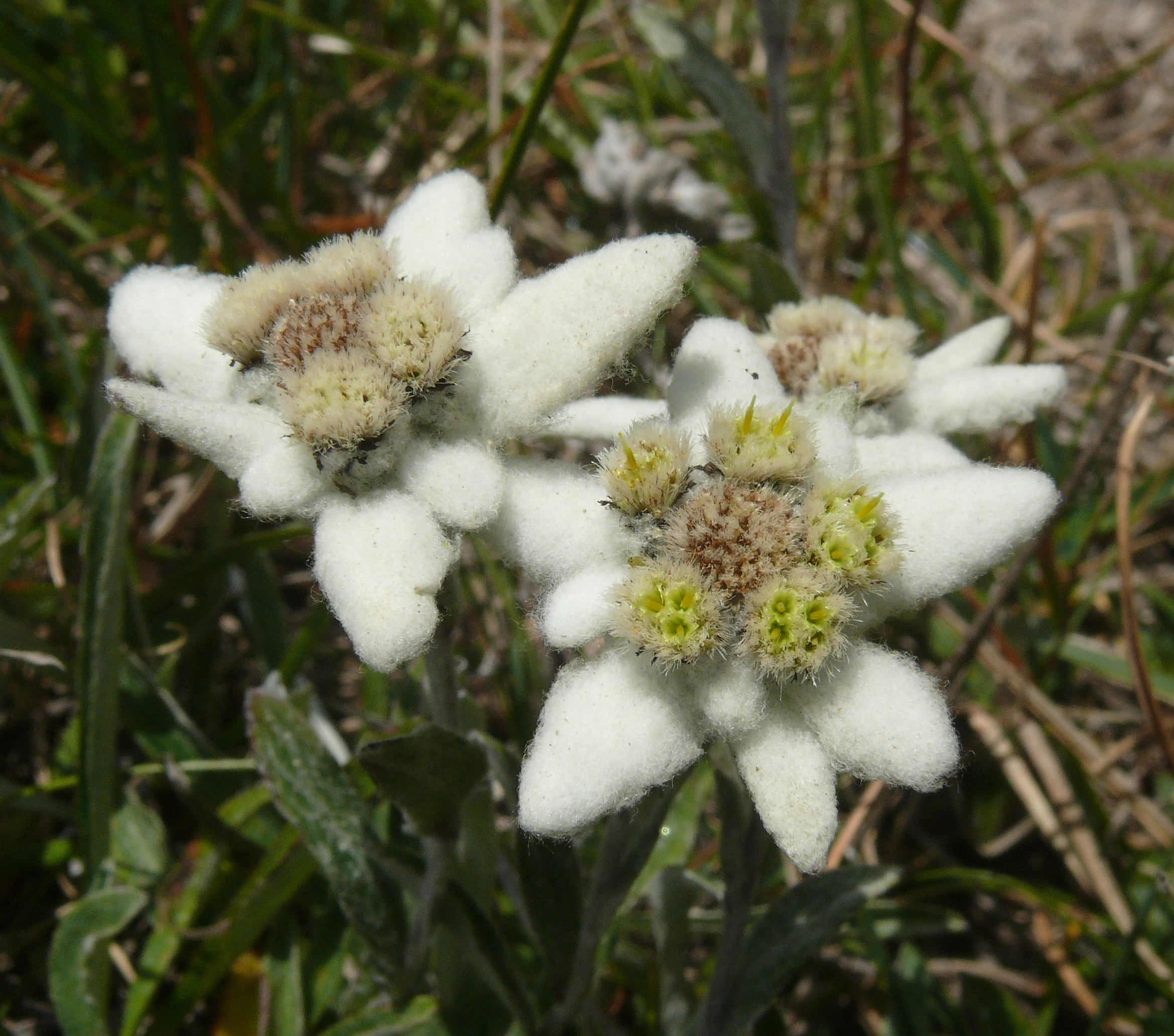
Late season version with "fat" appearance from flowered-out central floret-pods and from longer petal-"fuzz". Specimen found in the Stubai Alps.

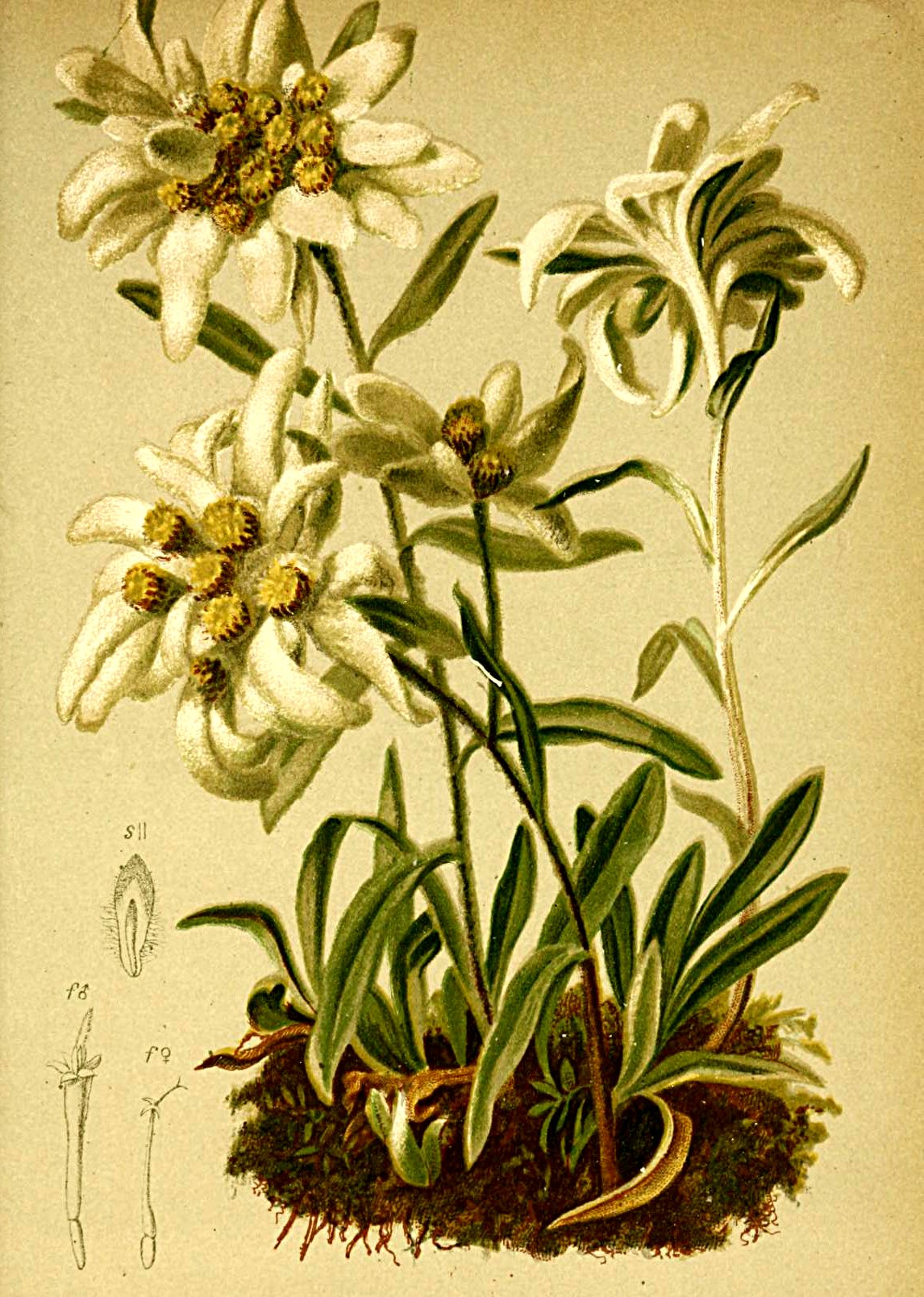
Botanic illustration.

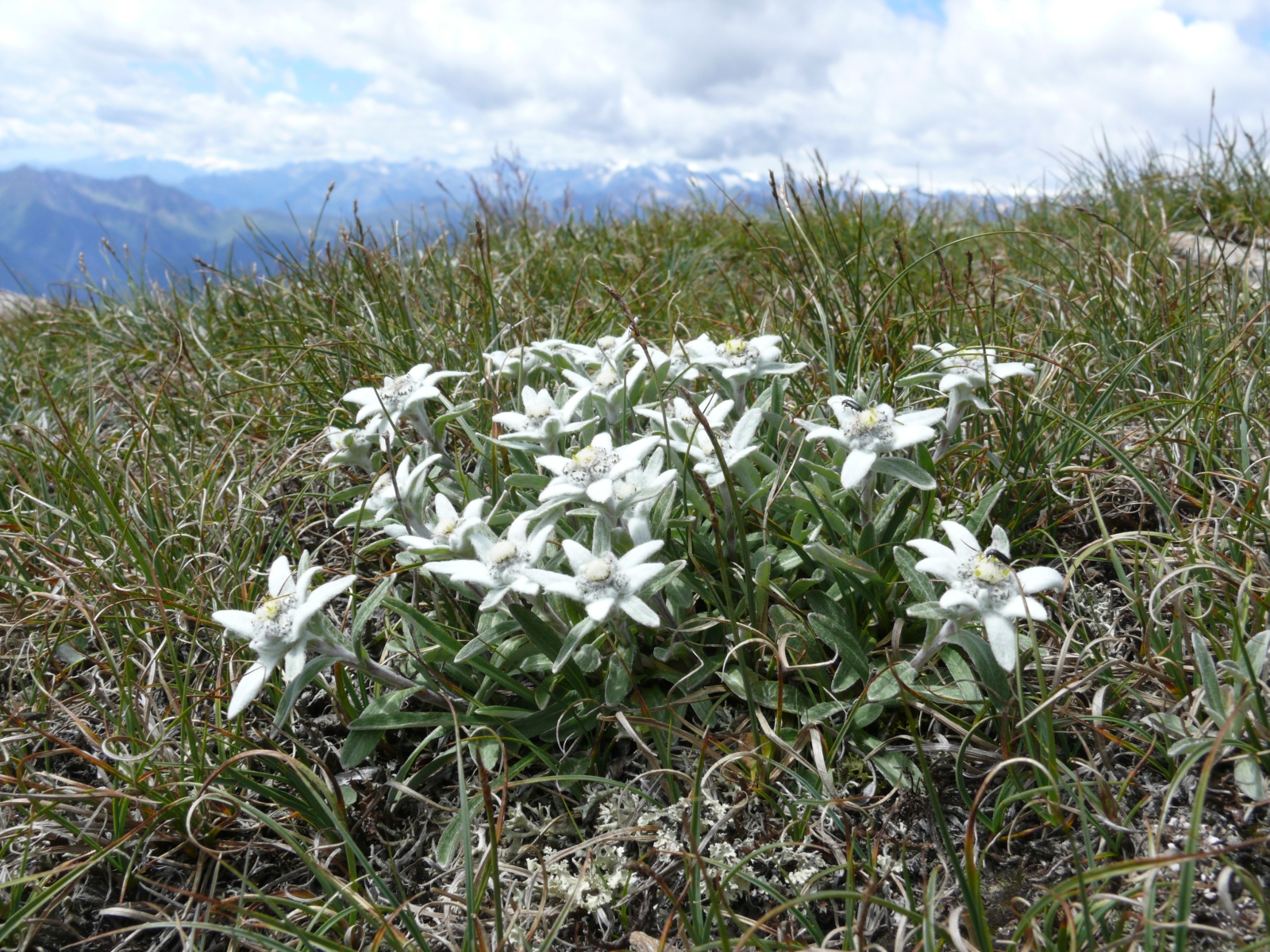
Several edelweiss together with the typical growth form in the Zillertal Alps in South Tyrol.

== Habitat and distribution ==
Leontopodium nivale prefers rocky limestone locations in the Alps, Pyrenees Mountains, and the Italian Apennines at about 1,800–3,400 metres (5,900–11,200 ft) altitude.

=== Range and substrate ===
The species is native to European mountains with a distribution centred on the Alps and extending westwards to the Pyrenees and eastwards into parts of the Balkans and the Apennines. Populations are typically restricted to exposed, calcareous (limestone and dolomite) scree and rocky cliffs, often on north-facing slopes where microclimate and substrate reduce competition from taller vegetation. Modern taxonomic resources (World Flora Online, Kew) map the species and its subspecies across central and southern European mountain ranges.

=== Altitude and ecology ===
Typical elevations are approximately 1,800–3,400 m (6,000–11,000 ft), although local populations may occur slightly outside this range depending on exposure and substrate. Plants are adapted to high UV, strong winds, wide temperature fluctuations and thin soils; the woolly hairs on leaves and bracts reduce water loss and block or scatter harmful ultraviolet wavelengths.

== Conservation ==
Leontopodium nivale is considered a least concern species by the IUCN. The IUCN assessment notes historic population declines in places due to overcollection (for souvenirs and horticulture) and local habitat loss, but reports that the overall species is not currently at high risk of extinction across its full range. Conservation measures that have helped stabilize populations include national legal protection in some countries, establishment of protected mountain areas and national parks that encompass large habitat patches, and ex-situ conservation (botanic gardens and seed collections).

=== Threats and measures ===
The main pressures recorded historically were collection from the wild and localized trampling/vegetation change from tourism and overgrazing on some sites. Because many populations are small and fragmented and occur in restricted alpine habitats, local threats can have outsized impacts; therefore many jurisdictions include edelweiss in lists of protected alpine plants or regulate collection. The IUCN recommends continued monitoring of population trends and protection of key subpopulations within well-managed protected areas; ex-situ cultivation and seed banking are employed by botanical gardens as complementary measures.

== Cultivation ==
Leontopodium nivale is grown in gardens for its interesting inflorescence and silver foliage. It grows in the end of May The plants are short lived and can be grown from seed.

=== Growing requirements and propagation ===
Edelweiss is best cultivated in rock gardens or well-drained gritty substrates that mimic its natural calcareous scree habitat. It requires full sun, excellent drainage, and low to moderate fertility; poorly drained soils or heavy fertilization quickly reduce plant vigor and longevity. Plants are generally short-lived perennials in cultivation but can be maintained by regular sowing from seed or by lifting and dividing clumps where permitted. Propagation is most commonly by seed (cold stratification improves germination), and some horticultural varieties have been selected for compact habit or longer flowering. Because wild collection was historically a threat, responsible horticulture relies on nursery-propagated stock and seed provenance records.

== Chemical constituents ==
Compounds of different classes, such as terpenoids, phenylpropanoids, fatty acids and polyacetylenes are reported in various parts of edelweiss plants. Leoligin was reported as the major lignan constituent and has been investigated for effects on cholesterol efflux in cell models; the principal phytochemistry has made edelweiss extracts of interest to the cosmetics and pharmaceutical industries.

The edelweiss has been used in traditional folk medicine in the Alps for centuries. Extracts from different parts of plants have been used to treat abdominal pain, respiratory diseases, heart disease, and against diarrhea. That is why it was also known as the bellyache flower for a long time. It was also used by the mountain people as a durable flower ("eternal flower") in dry bouquets. The cosmetics industry became aware of the plant and its extracts a few years ago.

== Symbolic uses ==
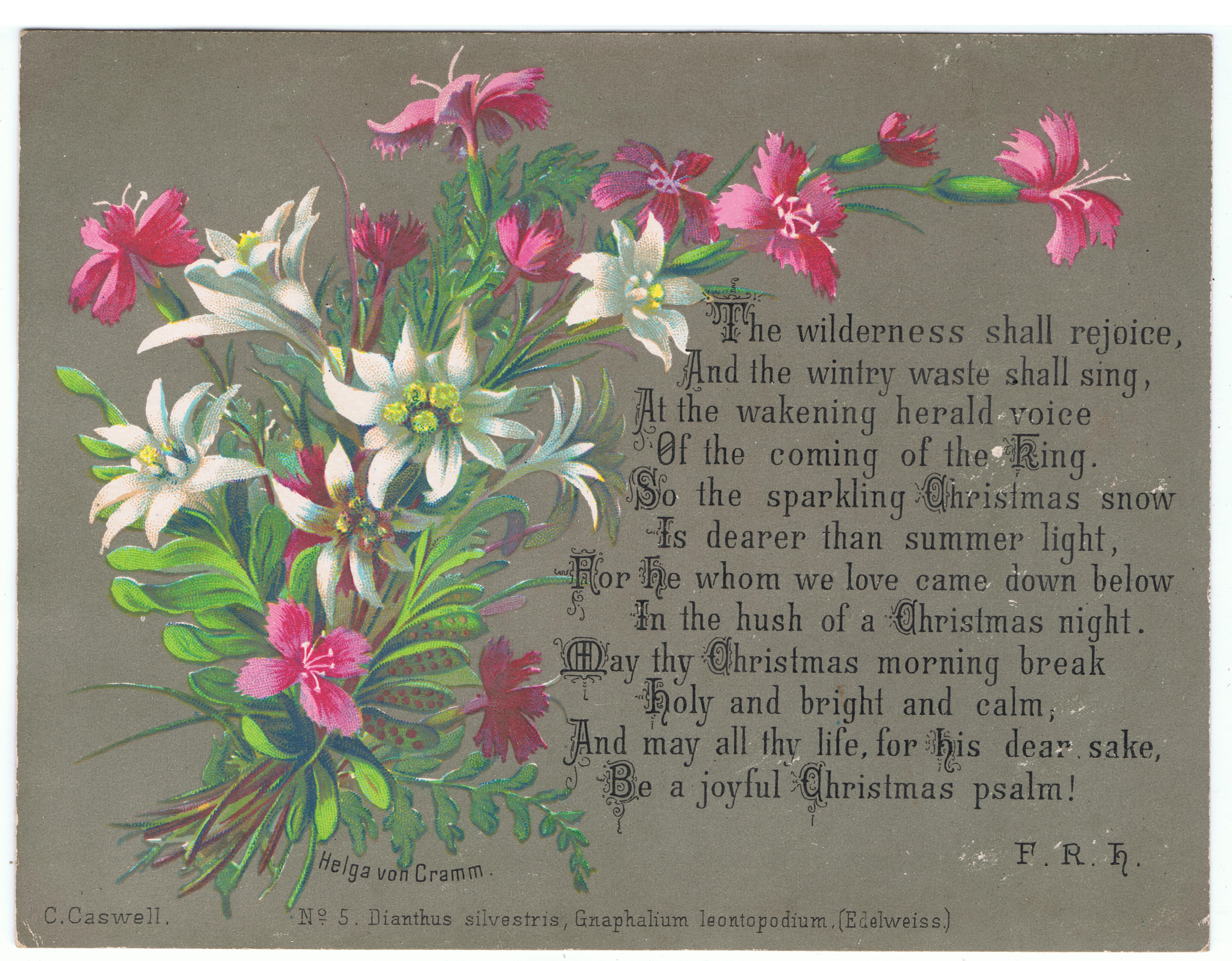
No.5, Dianthus silvestris, and Gnaphalium leontopodium, (Edelweiss), chromolithograph by Helga von Cramm, with hymn by F. R. Havergal, 1877.

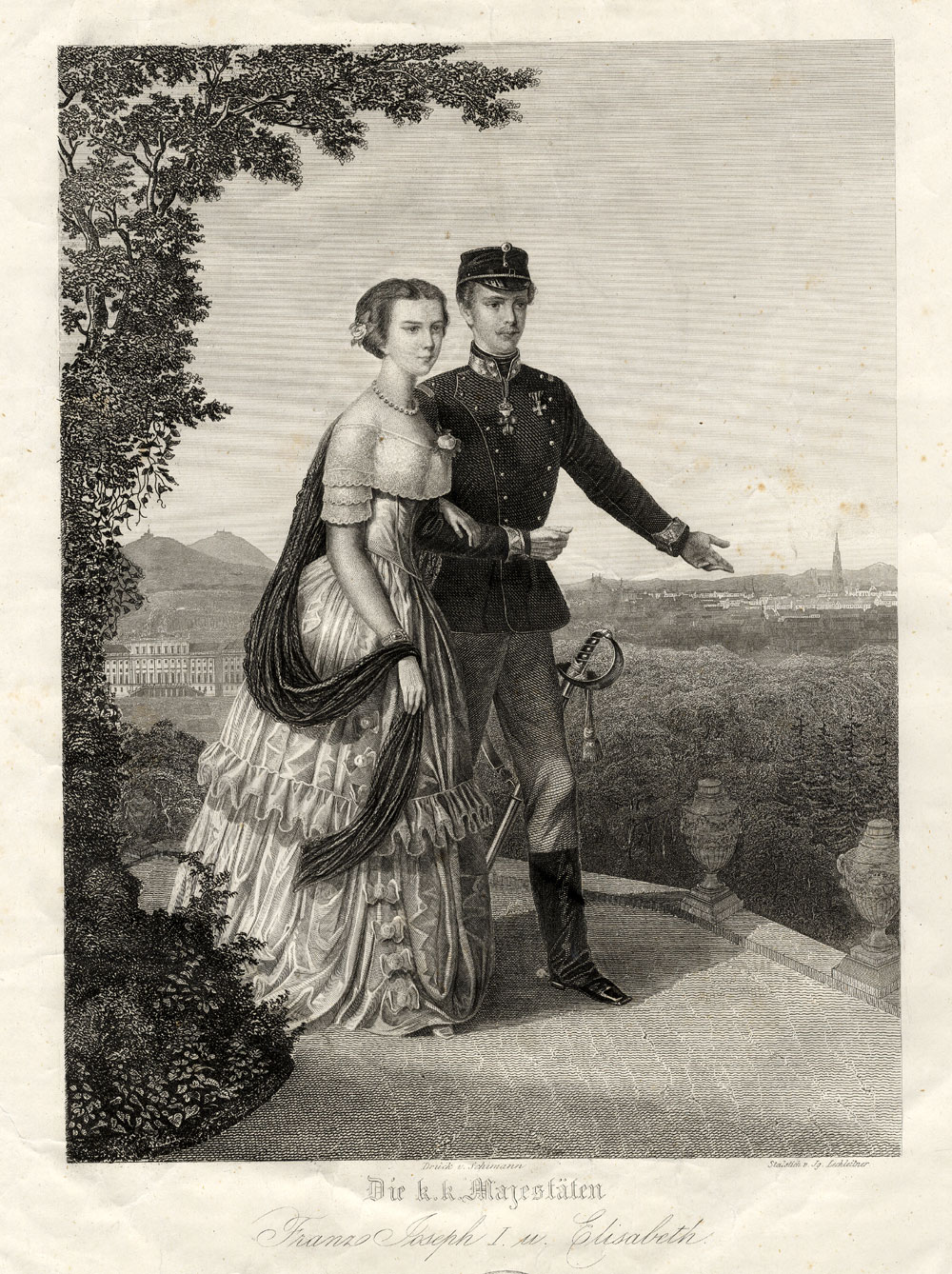
Austrian Emperor Franz Joseph I and Empress Elisabeth

In the 19th century, the edelweiss became a symbol of the rugged purity of the Alpine region and of its native inhabitants.

The passion for edelweiss, which had previously been neglected, began in the middle of the 19th century. The focus is on an incident from 1856, when the Austrian Emperor Franz Joseph I went on a mountain hike to the Pasterzen Glacier on the Großglockner with his wife Sisi. There the emperor picked his wife an edelweiss from the steep rock with the words "The first in my life that I picked myself". The affection for edelweiss was a common feature of the famous couple and this well-known story raised people's attention to this alpine plant.

The plant became known as a symbol of the Austrian Empress Elisabeth. A portrait by the painter Franz Xaver Winterhalter painted in 1865 shows Empress Elisabeth with nine artificial edelweiss stars braided in her hair. The jewelry made of precious metal and diamonds was designed in the years after 1850 by the then court and chamber jeweler Alexander Emanuel Köchert.

With the rise of mountain tourism at the end of the 19th century, the edelweiss became the badge and symbol of alpinists and mountaineers. In order to prevent the extinction of the often picked symbolic species, it was placed under nature protection early on. The edelweiss was soon adopted as a symbol in the logo of numerous alpine clubs and associations. In the Austro-Hungarian Army in particular, the symbolic relationship between defiant, frugal and resilient alpine plants, and the required perseverance, agility and cutting edge of the alpine troops was recognized, emphasized, and often promoted by badges and designations. The Alpen-Edelweiss was assigned as a badge by Emperor Franz Joseph to troops (three regiments of Kaiserschützen) of the Austro-Hungarian Army intended for use in the mountains. It was worn on the collar of the uniform skirt.

In Berthold Auerbach's novel Edelweiss (1861), the difficulty for an alpinist to acquire an edelweiss flower was exaggerated to the point of claiming: "the possession of one is a proof of unusual daring." This idea at the time was becoming part of the popular mythology of early alpinism. Auerbach's novel appeared in English translation in 1869, prefaced with a quote attributed to Ralph Waldo Emerson:

There is a flower known to botanists, one of the same genus with our summer plant called "Life-Everlasting", a Gnaphalium like that, which grows on the most inaccessible cliffs of the Tyrolese mountains, where the chamois dare hardly venture, and which the hunter, tempted by its beauty, and by his love (for it is immensely valued by the Swiss maidens), climbs the cliffs to gather, and is sometimes found dead at the foot, with the flower in his hand. It is called by botanists the Gnaphalium leontopodium, but by the Swiss Edelweisse, which signifies Noble Purity.

Together with the alpine gentian, the edelweiss is also a symbol of peaks and the air in the Alps today. These plants are celebrated with songs and souvenirs related to them are sold.

=== Before 1914 ===
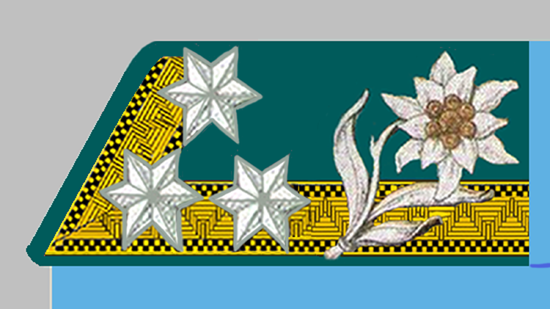
Kaiserjäger - Sergeant (Oberjäger)

- The edelweiss was established in 1907 as the sign of the Imperial-Royal Mountain Troops by Emperor Franz Joseph I. These original three Regiments wore their edelweiss on the collar of their uniform. Before 1918 there were also innumerable edelweiss badges in the Habsburg army. These include, for example, the military mountain guide award (ice ax with edelweiss and winding mountain rope), edelweiss emblems on the collar and cap or badges from alpine patrol companies. Many alpine units, commandos and soldiers proudly wore unofficial edelweiss badges.
- The edelweiss also played a role in the troop designation, which also reflected the special relationship with the mountains. In addition to the "Edelweiss Corps" (k.u.k. XIV. Corps) of Archduke Joseph Ferdinand, an "Edelweiss Division" was formed in the course of the First World War. It essentially consisted of Kaiserjäger of the 3rd and 4th regiments, the Salzburg infantry regiment "Archduke Rainer" No. 59 and the Upper Austrian infantry regiment "Grand Duke of Hesse and the Rhine" No. 14. In 1915, World War I, the edelweiss was granted to the German alpine troops for their bravery. Today, it is still the insignia of the Austrian, French, Slovenian, Polish, Romanian, and German alpine troops.
- In the Swiss Army, the highest ranks (brigadier general and higher) have badges in the form of edelweiss flowers, where other military branch badges would have stars

=== World Wars ===
- The song Stelutis alpinis (Friulian for "alpine edelweiss"), written by Arturo Zardini when he was an evacuee due to World War I, is now considered the unofficial anthem of Friuli
- The soldiers of the Austro-Hungarian army named a position right next to the Valparola Pass as the "Edelweiss position" during World War I
- The song Es war ein Edelweiss was written by Herms Niel for soldiers during World War II
- The edelweiss was a badge of the Edelweiss Pirates, anti-Nazi youth groups in the Third Reich, and was worn on clothes (such as a blouse or a suit)
- The edelweiss was the symbol of Wehrmacht and Waffen-SS Gebirgsjäger, or mountain rangers worn as a metal pin on the left side of the mountain cap, on the band of the service dress cap, and as a patch on the right sleeve. It is still the symbol of the mountain brigade in the German Army.
- The World War II Luftwaffe unit Kampfgeschwader 51 (51st Bomber Wing) was known as the Edelweiss Wing
- Operation "Edelweiss" was a project of the US Office of Strategic Services to get information about Hitler's Alpine Fortress in 1945

=== After 1945 ===
- The edelweiss is worn by troops in the 1st Battalion of the United States Army's 10th Special Forces Group, who adopted the symbol under the command of Colonel Aaron Bank after it had occupied a Waffen SS officer school (Junkerschule) at Flint Kaserne
- The song "Edelweiss" was written for the 1959 Rodgers and Hammerstein stage musical The Sound of Music and featured in the 1965 movie as well
- Since 2002, the Austrian 2 euro cent coin has depicted an edelweiss. From 1959 to 2001, the one-schilling coin depicted a bunch of three flowers.
- It is the symbol of the Bulgarian Tourist Union and the Bulgarian Mountain Control and Lifeguard Service
- It is also the symbol of the Swiss national tourism organisation
- It is featured on the Romanian fifty-lei note
- An Austrian brand of beer is Edelweiß
- The edelweiss is used in the logotypes of several alpine clubs such as the Deutscher Alpenverein (German Alpine Club), the Österreichischer Alpenverein (Austrian Alpine Club), the Societá Alpina Friulana (Friulian Alpine Club) or the Alpenverein Südtirol (South Tyrol Alpine Club). The edelweiss is also used in the logotype of the Union of International Mountain Leader Associations (UIMLA).
- The Südtiroler Volkspartei (South Tyrolean People's Party) uses the flower as its logo
- In Asterix in Switzerland (1970), the plot is driven by a quest to find edelweiss in the Swiss mountains and bring a bloom back to Gaul to cure a poisoned Roman quaestor
- Edelweiss Air, an international airline based in Switzerland, is named after the flower, which also appears in its logo
- The musician Moondog composed the song "High on a Rocky Ledge", inspired by the Edelweiss flower
- "Bring me Edelweiss" is the best-known song of the music group Edelweiss
- Polish professional ice hockey team MMKS Podhale Nowy Targ uses an edelweiss as its emblem
- Edelweiss Lodge and Resort is a military resort located in Garmisch, Germany
- The song La Belle Fleur Sauvage by Lord Huron has lyrics inspired by the tradition of presenting a loved one with an edelweiss
- In the 7th instalment of the Dark Parables franchise, the Snow Edelweiss flower is revealed to be the flower associated with the Snow Queen, Snow White, the counterpart to her fraternal twin brother, Prince Ross Red of the Fiery Rosa flower
- In HBO's 2001 mini series Band of Brothers, edelweiss is found on a dead German soldier's uniform. When asked about this, Captain Lewis Nixon replied, "That's edelweiss. It grows in the mountains, above the treeline. Which means he climbed up there to get it. Supposed to be the mark of a true soldier."
- In the tactical RPG, Valkyria Chronicles, the team names their tank "The Edelweiss" as a symbol of perseverance against their enemy
- In the Korean drama Crash Landing on You, Ri Jyeong Hyuk gives Yoon Se-ri a potted edelweiss. He later asks her to meet him "where the edelweiss grows", referring to the Jungfrau region where they later meet again.
- Edelweiss is used as a symbol by 10th Mountain Assault Brigade of the Ukrainian Armed Forces. In February 2023 the brigade was granted the honorific "Edelweiss" by President Volodymyr Zelenskyy.
- After Lithuania regained its independence, children of German descent living in Lithuania formed the Edelweiss community, later renamed the Edelweiss-Wolfskinder (Wolf children)
- "Tiroler Edelweiss" is a song by California black metal band Minenwerfer from their 2019 album Alpenpässe recounting the Alpine theater of World War I
- Edelweiss is a Hungarian Neo-Nazi doom and black metal band that, along with their name, uses the flower in their album covers and merchandise, along with other symbols like the SS runes, the Totenkopf, and the Black Sun

=== Gallery ===
Some symbolic use from ancient times to the present

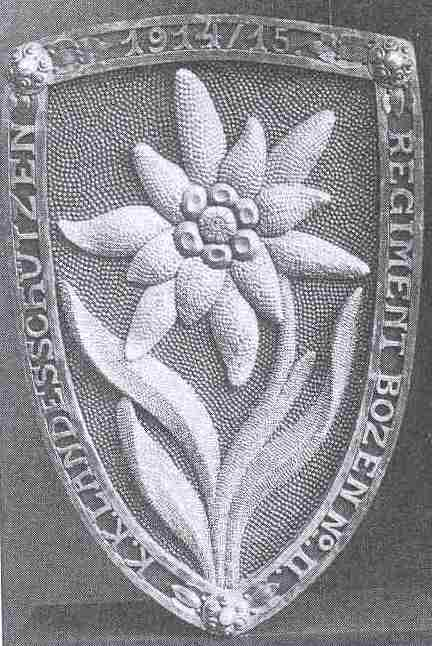
World War One-era nail-fundraiser monument: the Iron Edelweiss of Enns, Austria.

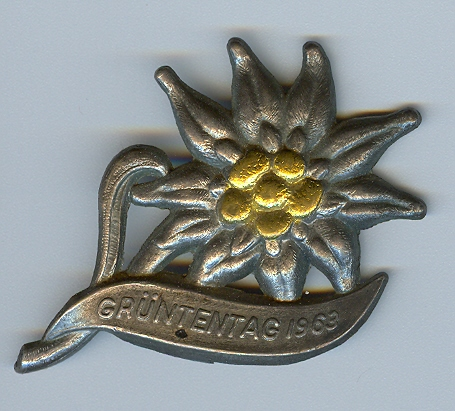
1963 German mountain sport pin.

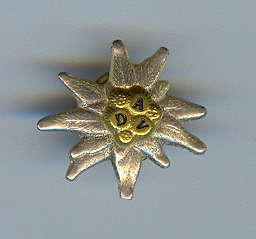
German Alpine Club logo pin.

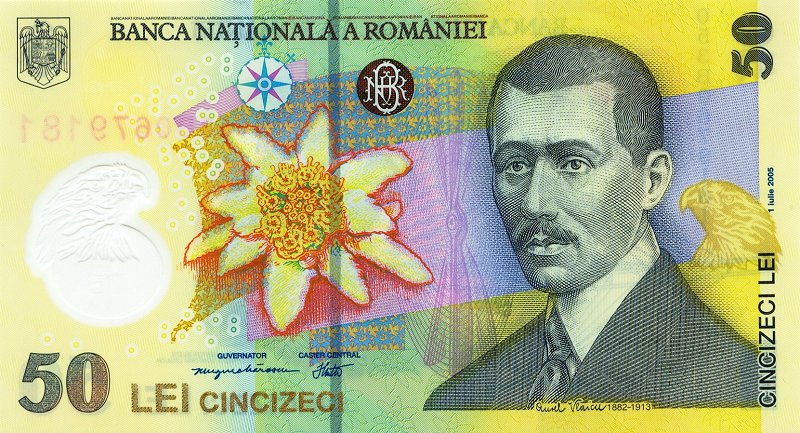
On a Romanian fifty lei note.

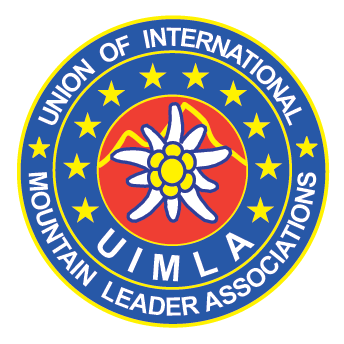
Logo of the Union of International Mountain Leader Associations.

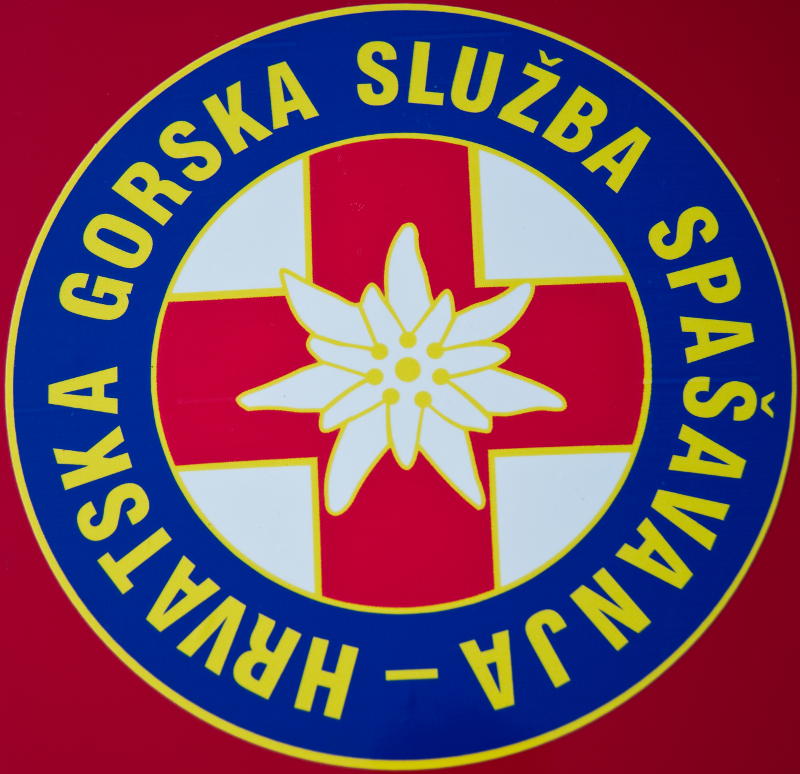
Logo of Croatian Mountain Rescue Service

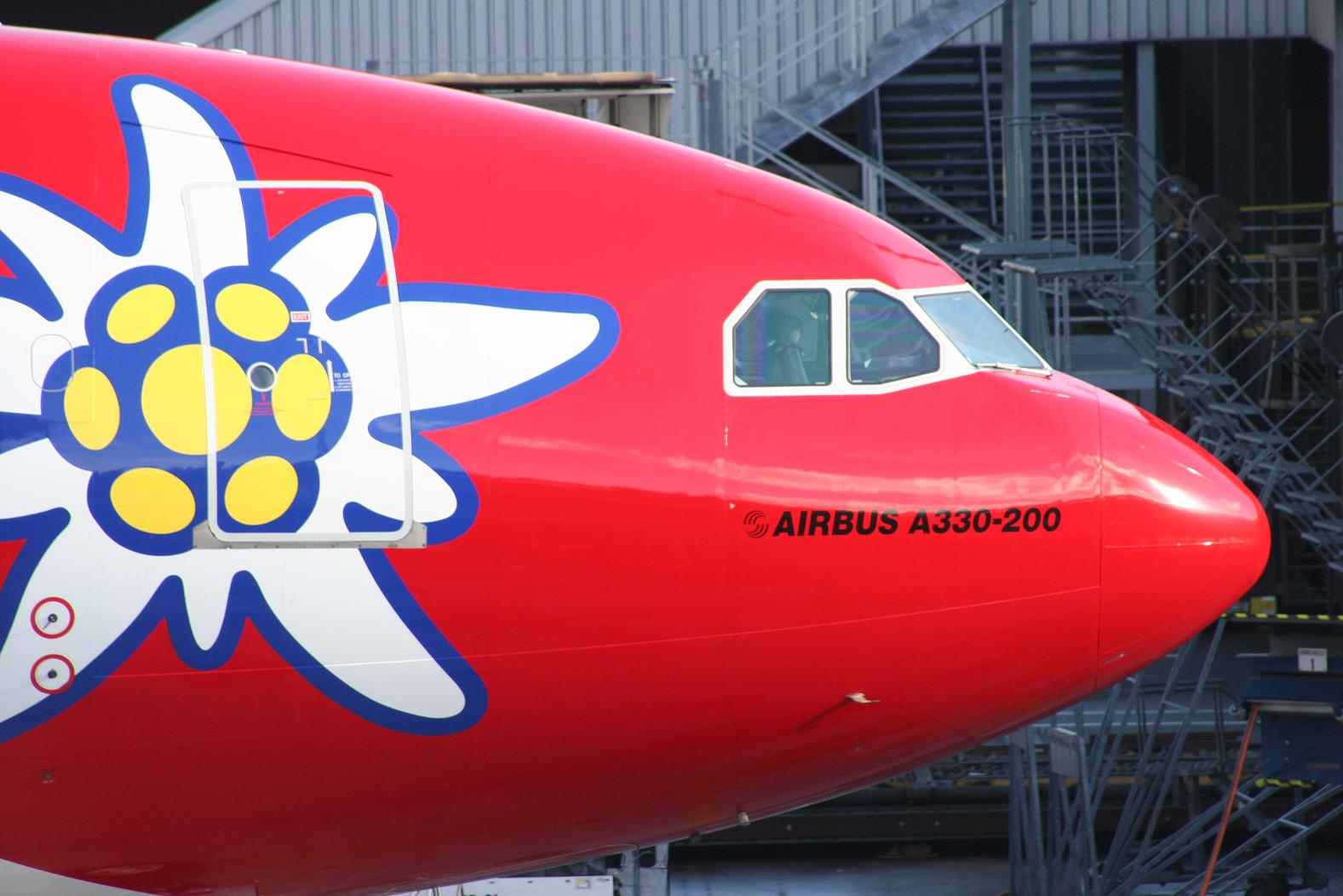
Aircraft livery of Edelweiss Air.

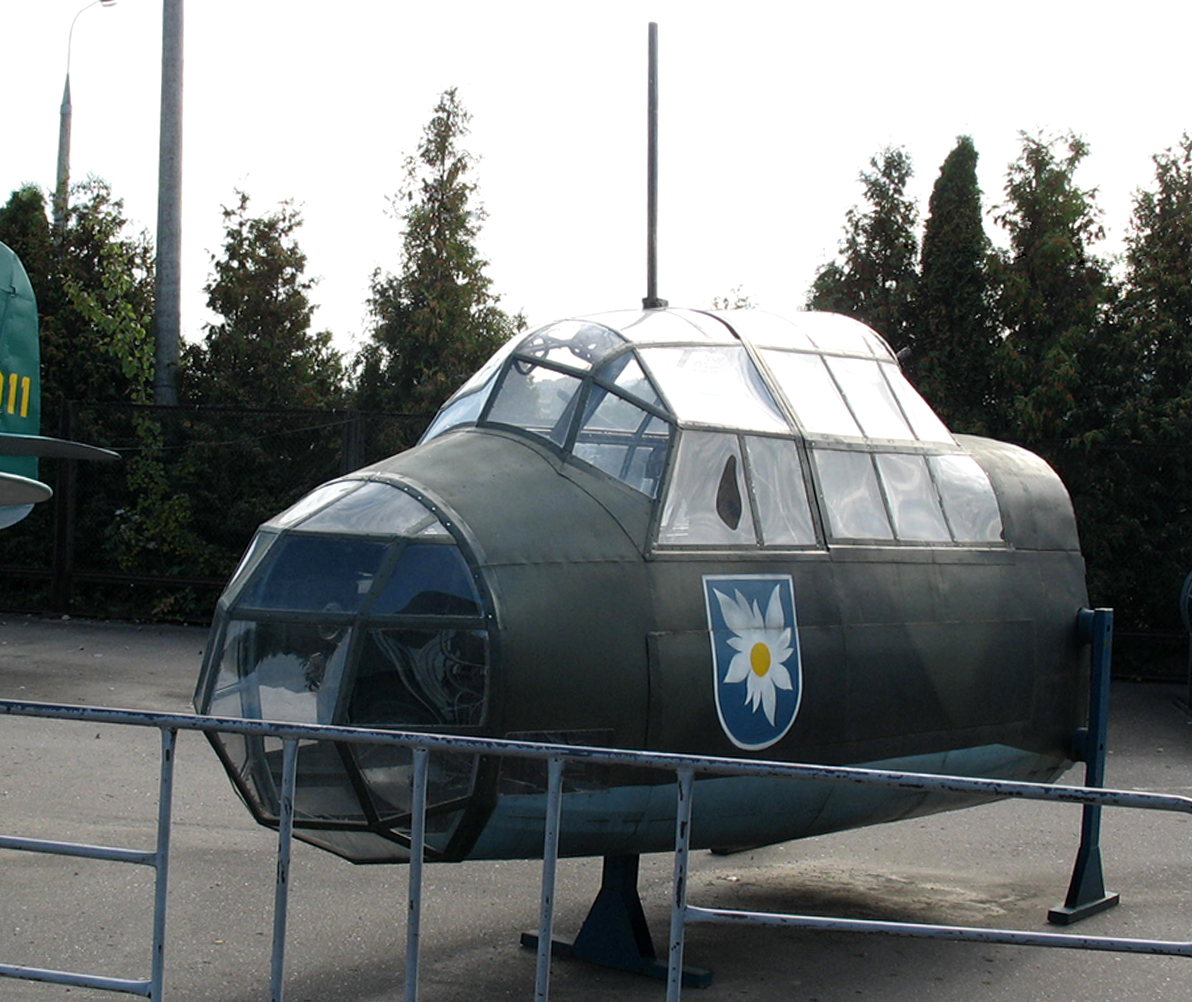
Nazi-era nose art on a bomber from the "Edelweiss Wing" (KG 51).

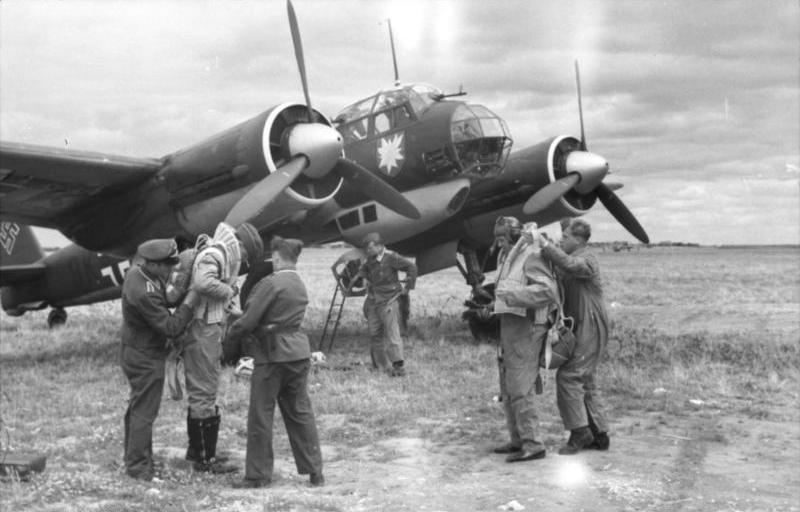
Nazi-era photo with KG 51 insignia on a Ju 88 bomber.

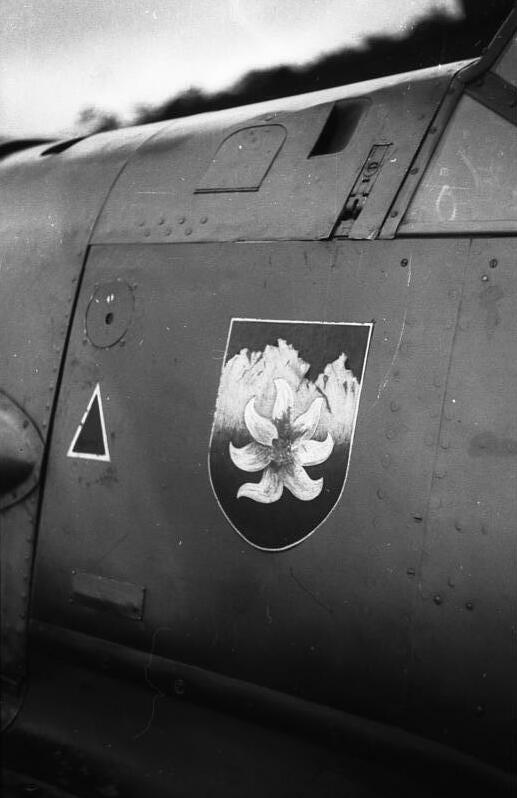
1939 Nazi-era aircraft nose art.

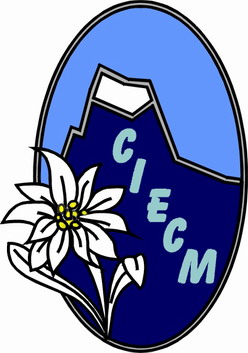
French mountain troops school emblem.

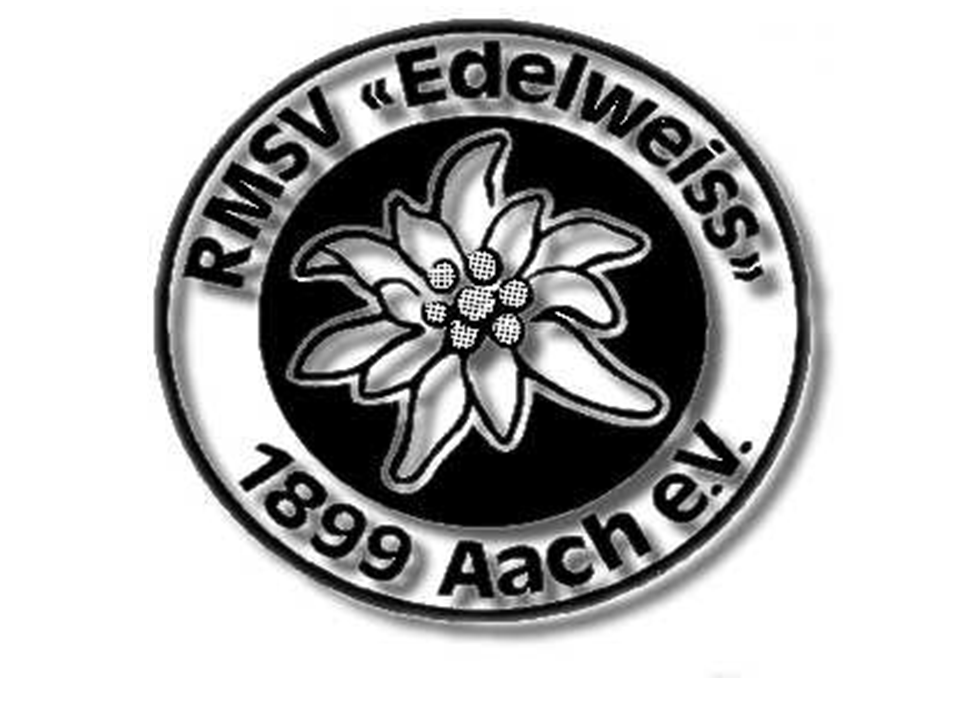
Logo of German sports association RMSV.

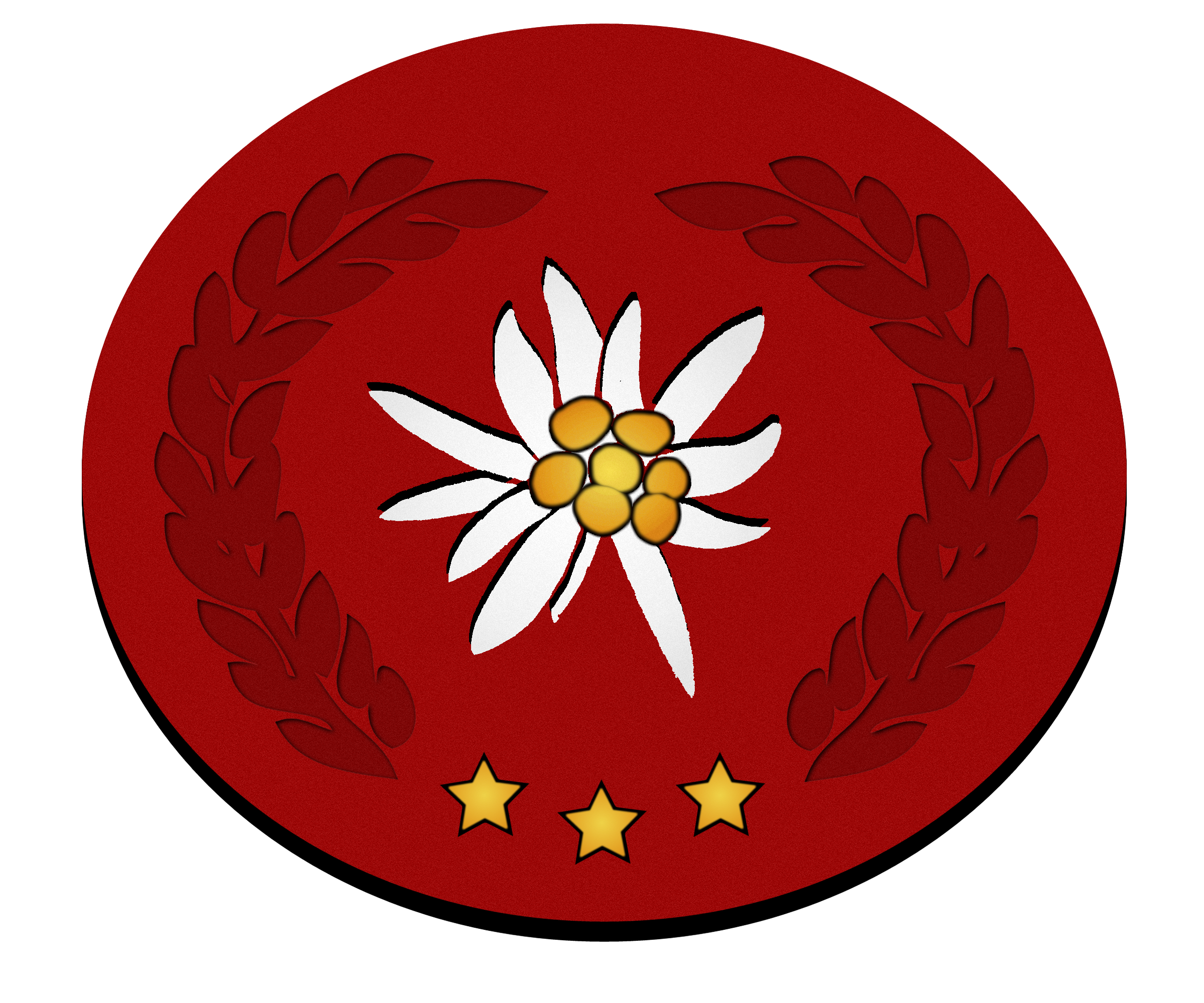
Rank insignia in the Swiss postal service.

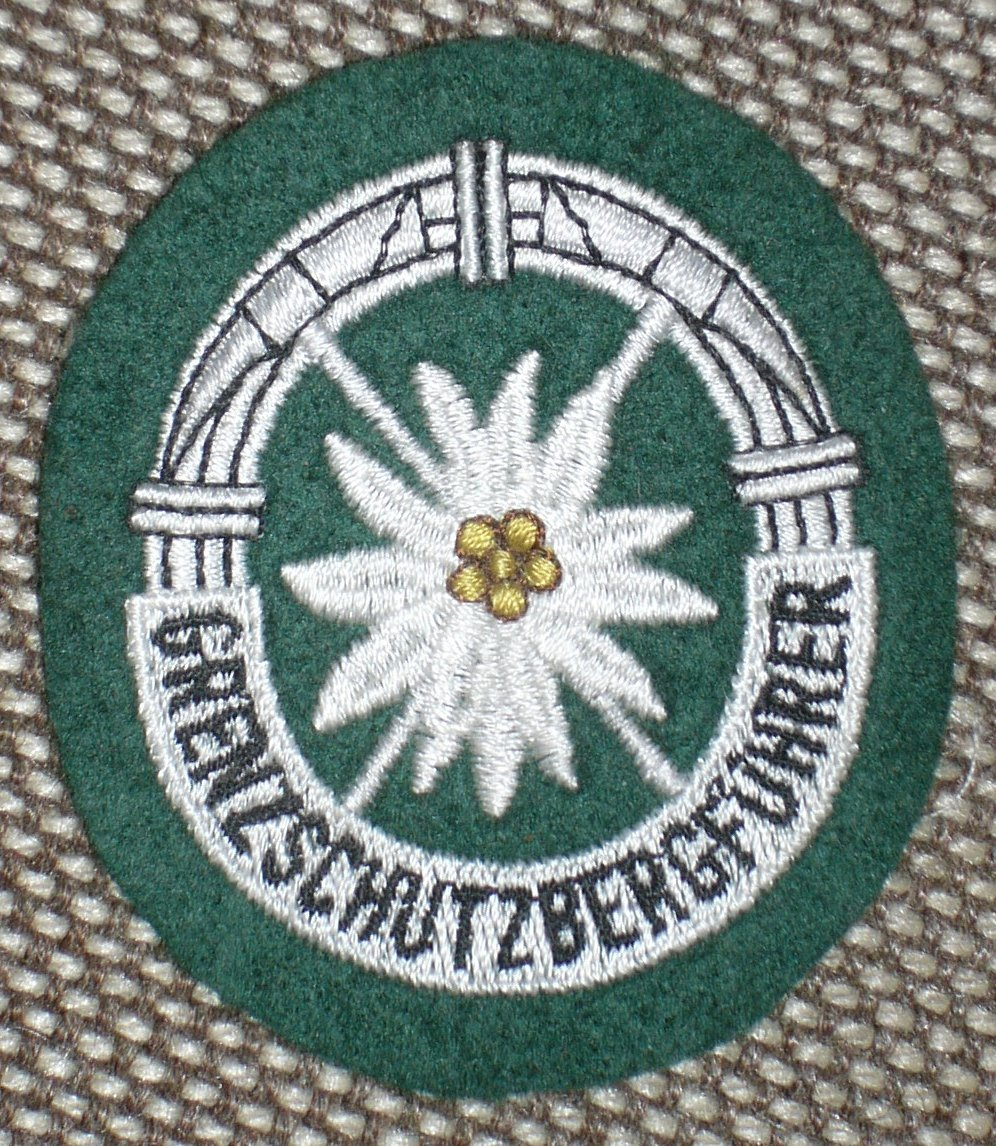
German Federal Police rank insignia patch.

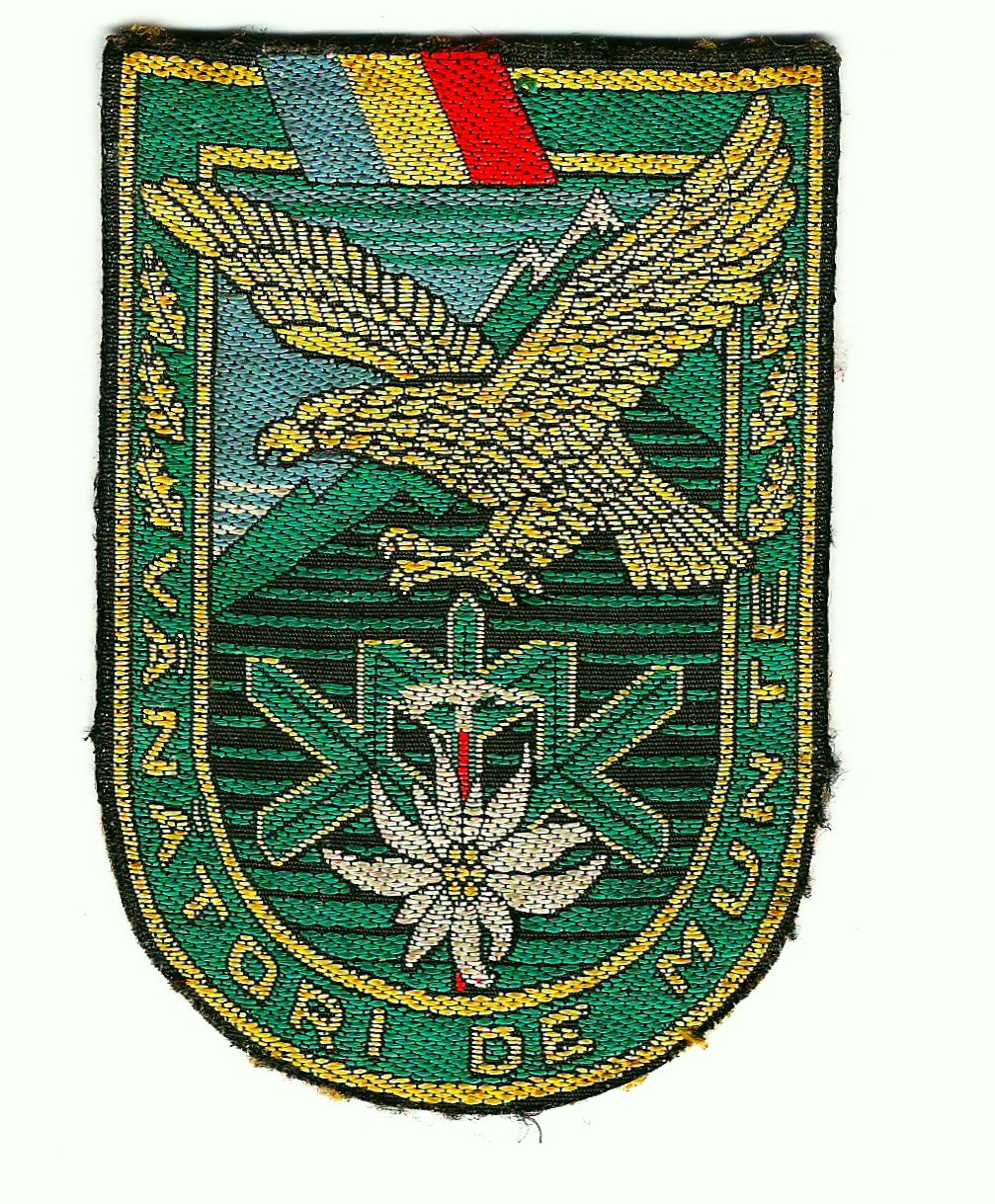
Patch used by Vânatori de munte (The elite mountain troops of the Romanian Land Forces)

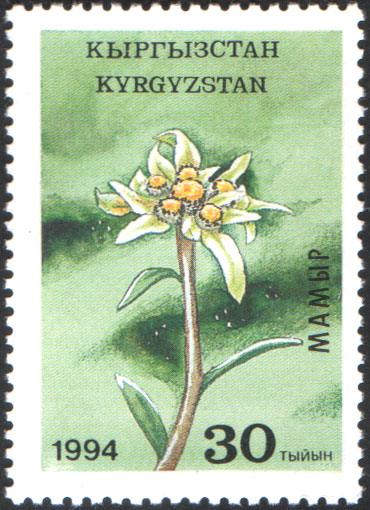
Kyrgyz postage stamp from 1994.

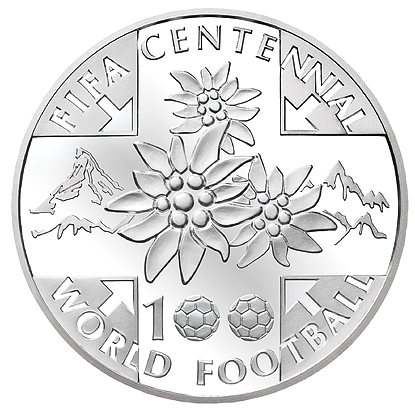
On 2004 Swiss coin.

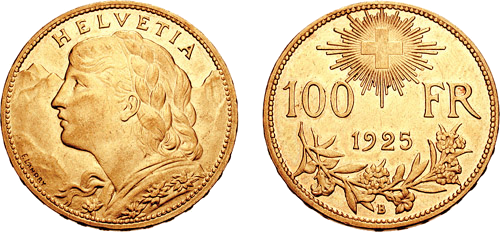
On 1925 gold 100 Swiss francs coin.

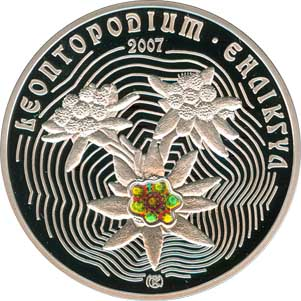
Kazakhstan 500 tenge coin.

Four-"Star" rank insignia of the top Swiss general.

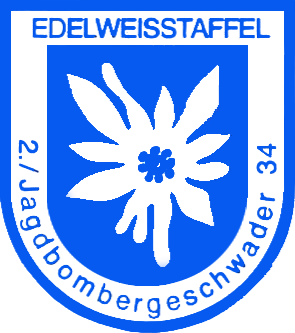
West/German military "Allgäu" fighter/bomber group, 1958–2003.

West/German military 23rd mountain rifles troops emblem.

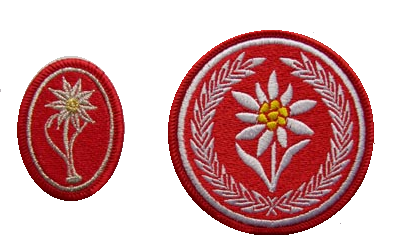
Insignia of the Polish Army Podhale Rifles.

Insignia of the Polish Army 21st Podhale Rifles Brigade.

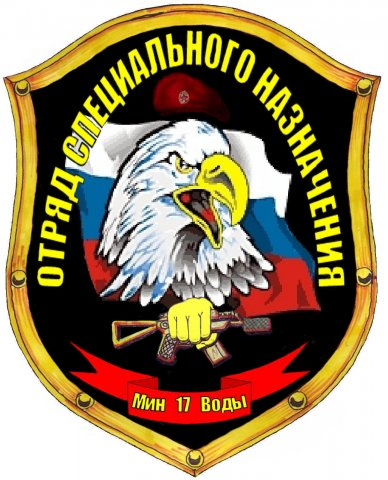
Russian military 17 ОСН "Edelweiss" emblem.

Arms of Vaujany, France.

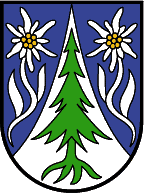
Arms of Au, Austria.

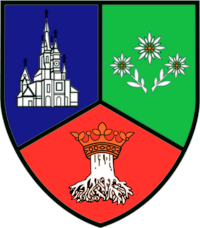
Arms of the county of Brașov, Romania.

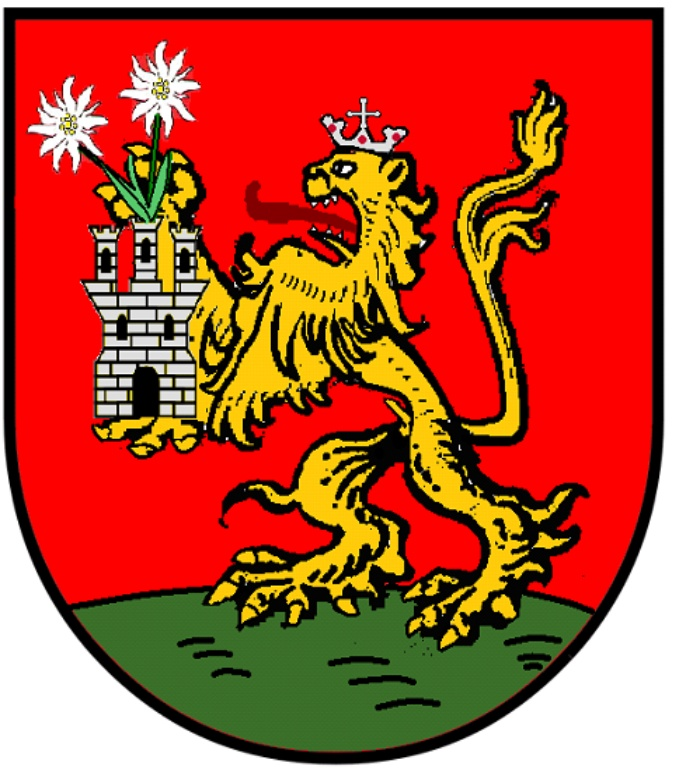
Arms of Dramsha, Bulgaria.

Arms of Bonnefamille, France.

Arms of Chamonix-Mont-Blanc, France.

Arms of Carroz d'Arâches, France.

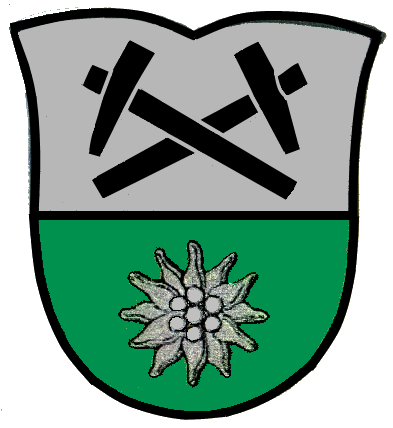
Arms of Eisenärzt, Germany.

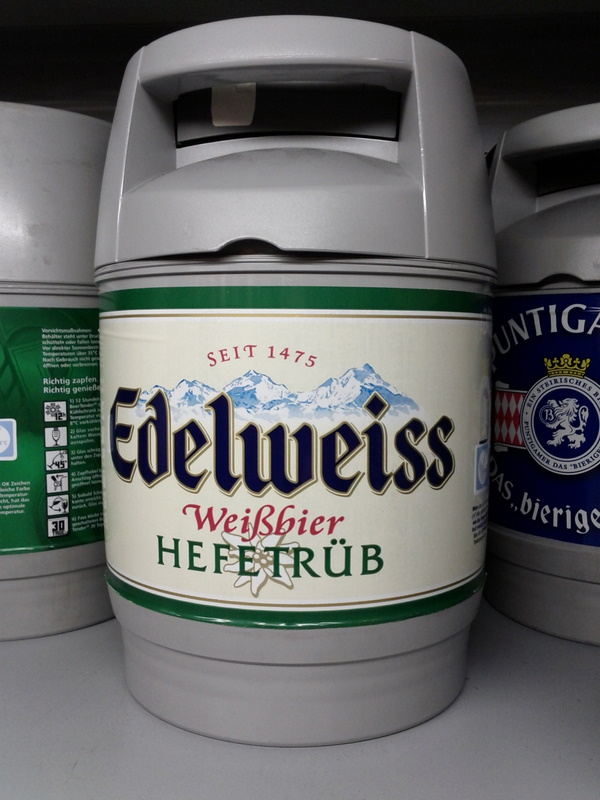
Logo of Edelweiss Beer.

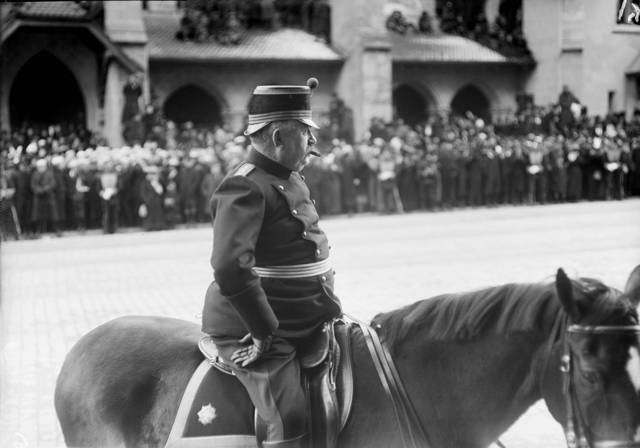
General's "star" on the saddle of World War I-era Swiss commander Ulrich Wille.

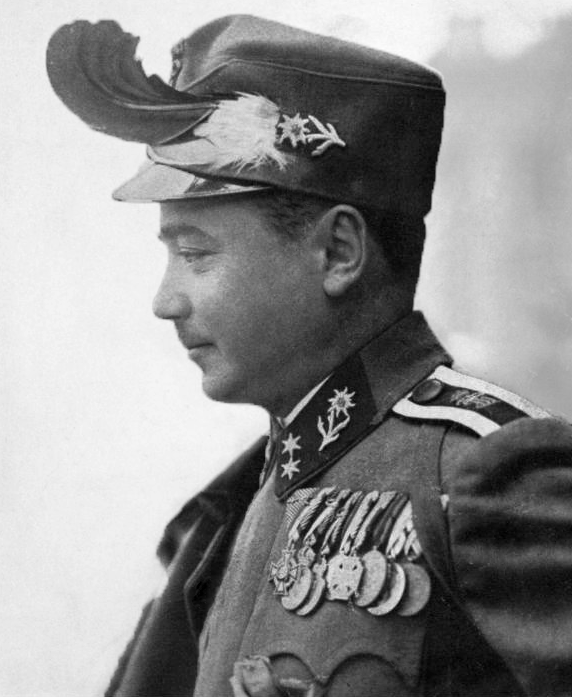
On the hat and collar circa 1933 of Austria's Engelbert Dollfuss.

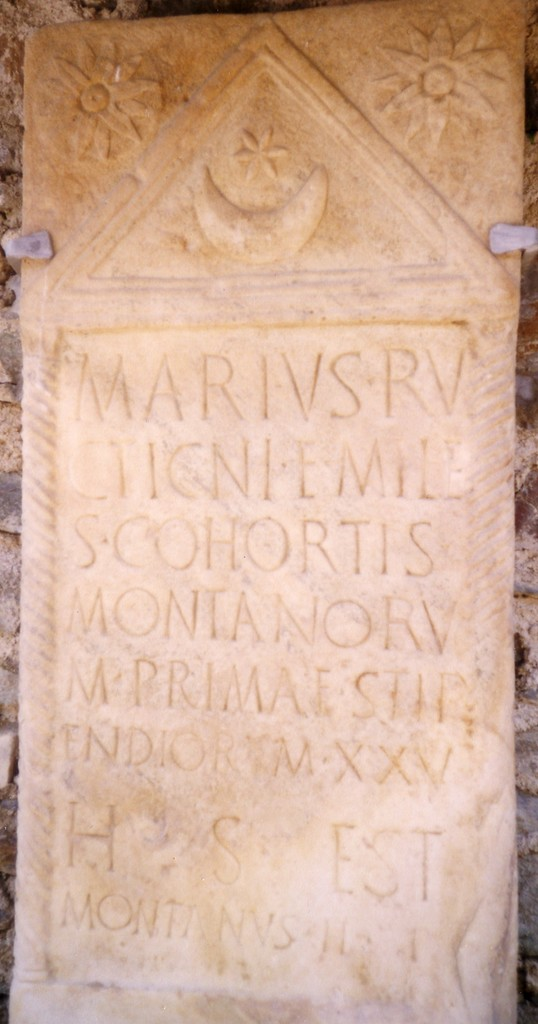
Imperial Roman tombstone found in Austria of soldier Marius, son of Ructinus.

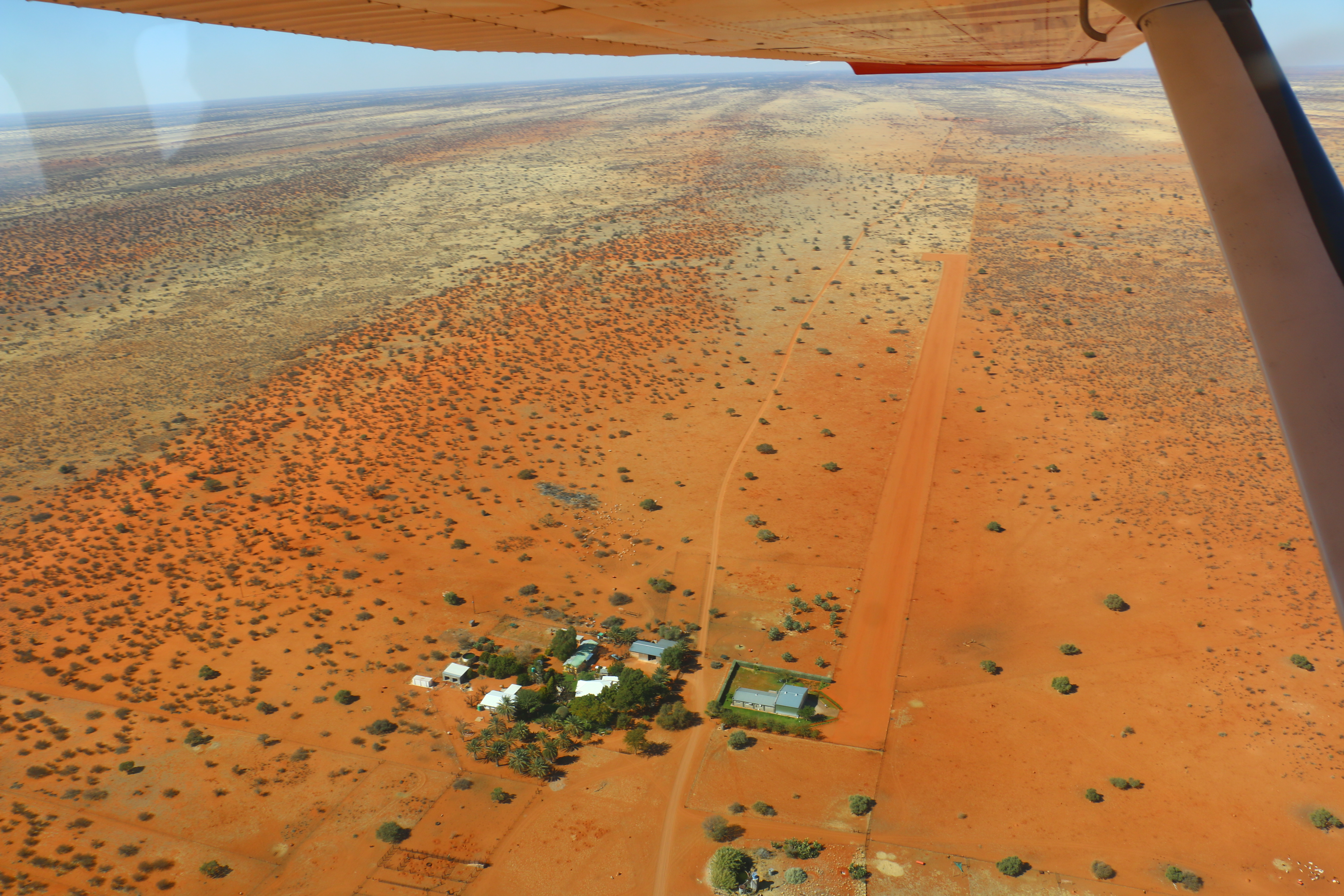
Bird's eye view of farm Edelweiss 11 km west of Stampriet / Namibia

== Use ==
A Swiss company markets a water-soluble isotonic drink containing edelweiss extract, vitamins, and minerals. The company presents it as the world's first water-soluble revitalizing isotonic drink of its kind and describes edelweiss as having antioxidant and anti-inflammatory properties. Edelweiss is also used in anti-aging skincare products, including the siin “Edition Edelweiss” product line.

== See also ==
- Flora of the Alps
- Golden age of alpinism
