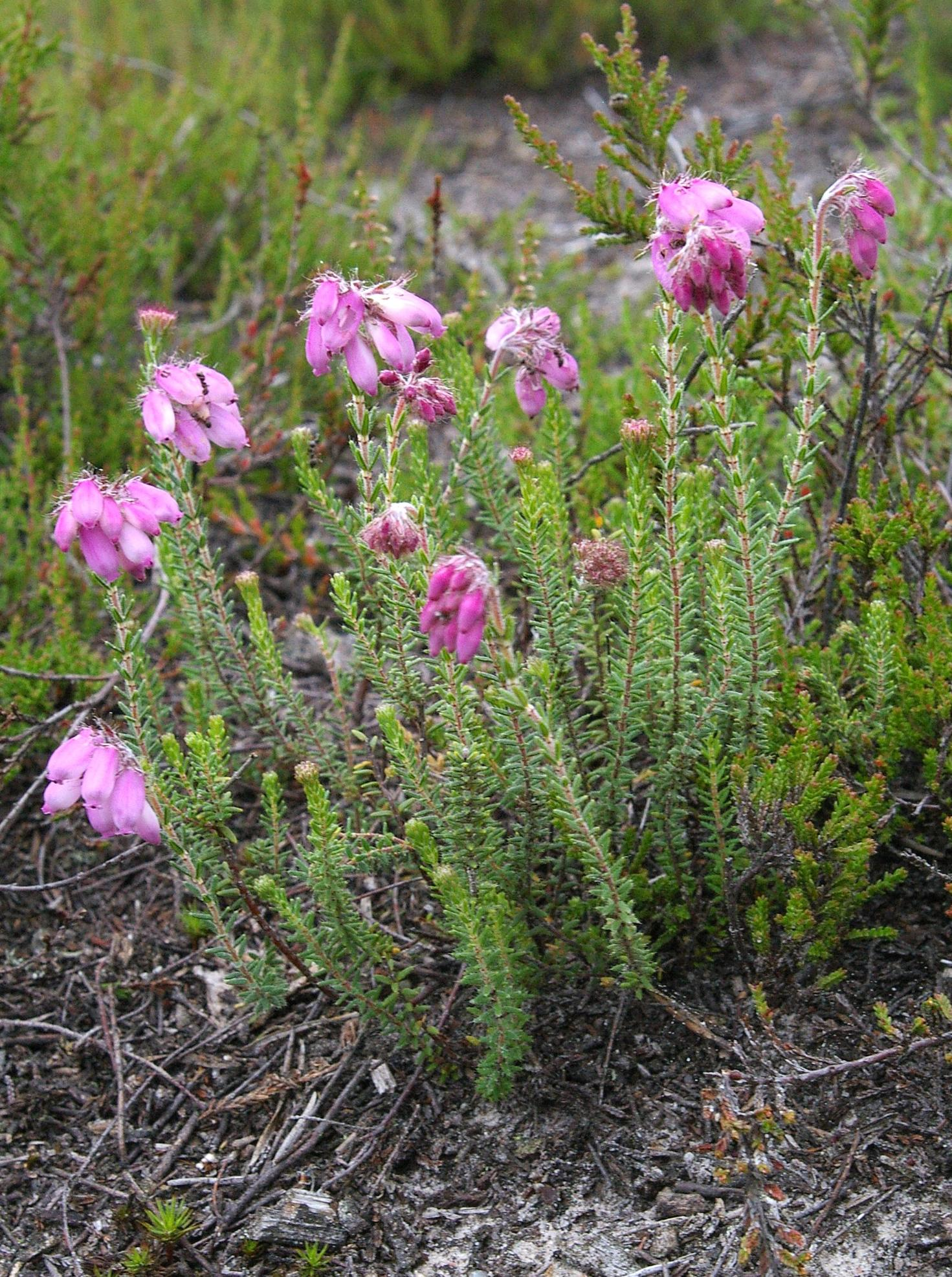

Scientific classification
- Kingdom: Plantae
- Clade: Embryophytes
- Clade: Tracheophytes
- Clade: Angiosperms
- Clade: Eudicots
- Clade: Asterids
- Order: Ericales
- Family: Ericaceae
- Genus: Erica
- Species: E. tetralix

Binomial name
- Erica tetralix L.
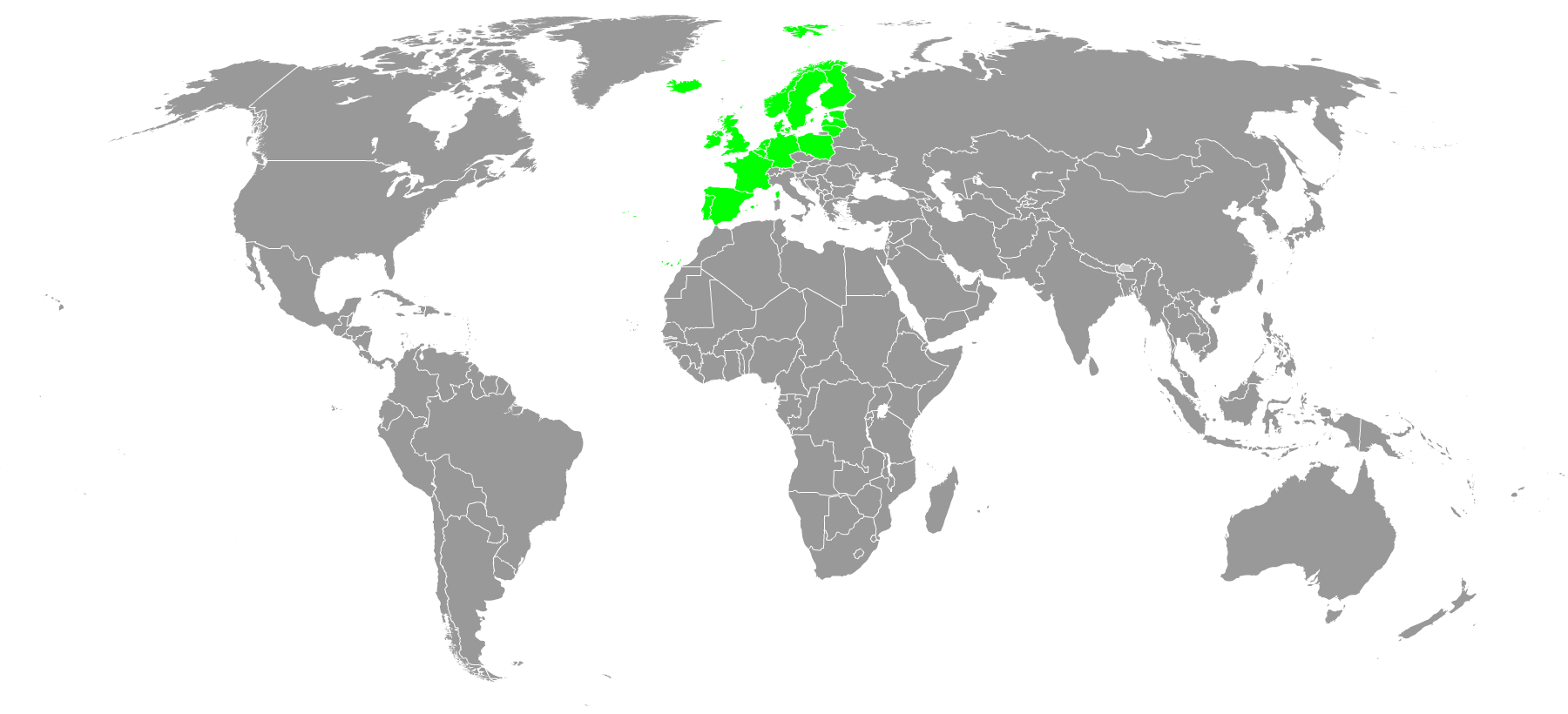

= Erica tetralix =

Species of flowering plant in the heather family

Erica tetralix, the cross-leaved heath, is a species of flowering plant in the family Ericaceae, native to western Europe.

== Description ==
It is a perennial subshrub with glandular leaves in whorls of four (whence the name). Appearing in summer and autumn, small pink bell-shaped flowers droop in compact clusters at the ends of the shoots.

=== Similar species ===
Related species E. cinerea has glabrous leaves in whorls of three. Calluna vulgaris has much smaller and scale-like leaves in opposite and decussate pairs.

== Taxonomy ==
The sticky, adhesive glands on leaves, sepals and other parts of the plant prompted Charles Darwin to suggest that this species might be a protocarnivorous plant, but little, if any, research has been done on this.

== Distribution and habitat ==
E. tetralix is native to western Europe from southern Portugal to central Norway, as well as a number of boggy regions further from the coast in Central Europe such as Austria and Switzerland. It has also been introduced to parts of North America.

E. tetralix can become a dominant part of the flora in bogs, wet heaths, and damp coniferous woodland.

== Ecology ==
A species of Trialeurodes whitefly discovered in 1971 was named T. ericae for the plant, due to its frequent association with it.

== Cultivation ==
In cultivation, like other heathers, E. tetralix requires an acidic soil, as it is a calcifuge. Numerous cultivars have been developed for garden use, of which E. tetralix f. alba 'Alba Mollis' (a white-flowered variety) and E. tetralix f. stellata 'Pink Star' have gained the Royal Horticultural Society's Award of Garden Merit.

== In culture ==
It appears in the 1938 German marching song "Erika" by Herms Niel.
