= Kleo Pleyer =

German politician (1898–1942)

Kleo Pleyer (19 November 1898 – 26 March 1942) was a Nazi politician and academic.

== Career ==
Pleyer was a historian and sociologist and a professor at the Königsberg Albertina University and Eberhard Karls University of Tübingen.

In 1939, he became a volunteer soldier for the Wehrmacht and eventually became an Oberleutnant. He was awarded the Iron Cross, first class and second class. He was killed in action while serving as his company's commander at the Demyansk Pocket.

During his winter holidays in 1941–42, he wrote Volk im Feld (1943), or Nation at War. The book discussed the German campaigns in France and Russia. Pleyer not only justified the brutal treatment of prisoners of war, but called for the Ausrottung des Judentums (Extermination of Jewry). During the war, a large number of copies of the book were printed. The book was published posthumously, as Pleyer was killed fighting on the Eastern Front in 1942. Pleyer also wrote the lyrics of Kampflied der Nationalsozialisten (Combat Song of the National Socialists), the battle song of the Nazi Party, and the Leader of the Bündischen Front (BF). In Königsberg, Pleyer was posthumously awarded the Kant-Prize.

== Personal life ==
He was married to Luithgard Pleyer, who bore him seven children.
