= Es war ein Edelweiss =

1941 German Army march by Herms Niel

Es war ein Edelweiss (English: "It Was an Edelweiss") is a march, with music and lyrics composed by Herms Niel in 1939 for the German Army.

== Variations ==
The French version, L’Edelweiss, is a march of the French Foreign Legion. This march was subsequently translated during WWII by members of the Legion of French Volunteers Against Bolshevism (Légion des Volontaires Français, LVF). These men, who included a number of former legionnaires, volunteered for the Eastern Front to fight there alongside Germans, against Stalin‘s Soviet Union.

== Lyrics and translation ==
German lyrics	Poetic translation	Literal translation
First stanza
Ganz einsam und verlassen an steiler Felsenwand, stolz unter blauem Himmel ein kleines Blümelein stand Ich konnt' nicht widerstehen, ich brach das Blümelein, und schenkte es dem schönsten, herzliebsten Mägdelein Refrain: Es war ein Edelweiß, ein kleines Edelweiß, Holla-hidi hollala, Hollahi diho.	Forlorn and all abandoned, On a cliff face that loomed Proud, under the blue sky, A tiny flower bloomed. I just could not resist it, and picked it where it grew, And gave it to the dearest That my heart ever knew Refrain: It was an edelweiss, One little edelweiss, Holla-hidi hollala, Hollahi diho.	Entirely lonesome and abandoned on steep cliff wall, proud under blue heaven a little flower stands I could not withstand, I broke the flower, and gave it to the loveliest heart's-dearest maiden Refrain: It was an edelweiss, One little edelweiss, Holla-hidi hollala, Hollahi diho.
Second stanza
Sie trägt es mir zu Ehren an ihrem Sonntagskleid. Sie weiß, dass dieses Blümelein ein Männerherz erfreut. Sie trägt es mir zuliebe, und ich bin stolz darauf, denn diese kleine Blümelein schloss einst zwei Herzen auf. Refrain	She wore with pride and honour, It on her Sunday best. She knows this little, tiny star A man's heart cheers the best. Just for my sake she wore it, And it does make me proud, 'cause of this little flower, Two hearts each other vowed. Refrain	She wore it in my honour, on her Sunday´s dress. She knows this little star cheers a man´s heart she wore it for my sake And I´m proud of that because this little flower once locked two hearts up Refrain
Third stanza
So einsam und verlassen, wie dieses Blümelein stand, so standen wir im Leben, bis Herz zu Herz sich fand. Ein Leben voller Liebe und Glück und Sonnenschein hat uns gebracht das kleine, einsame Blümelein. Refrain	So lonesome and abandoned, As this small flower stood, So were our lives forlorn Till two hearts joined for good. A life of love forever With luck and shining sun, Is what this flow'r presented, What it for us has done. Refrain	So lonesome and abandoned, as this small flower stood, so we stand in life, until heart to heart finds one another. A life full of love With luck and sunshine, was brought to us by the lonely little flower. Refrain

== See also ==
- Nazi songs
- Erika (song)
- Königgrätzer Marsch
- Panzerlied
