= Air March =

Russian military march

Авиамарш
English: Air March
- Organizational anthem of the Russian Aerospace Forces
- Also known as: Марш авиаторов (English: Aviator's March)
- Lyrics: Pavel German
- Music: Yuly Khayt
- Published: 1923

The "Air March" (Russian: Авиамарш, romanized: Aviamarsh), also known as the "Aviators' March" (Russian: Марш авиаторов, romanized: Marsh aviatorov) or Higher (Russian: Всё выше, romanized: Vsyo vyshe), is a Soviet military march published in 1923. It currently serves as the organizational anthem of the Russian Aerospace Forces. It formerly served as the organizational anthem of the Soviet Air Force. The music to the march was composed by Yuly Khayt, and its lyrics were written by Pavel German. It is part of the repertoire of Russian military bands and is frequently performed at Victory Day Parades in Moscow and throughout the former Soviet Union.

== Usage in other countries ==
The melody was borrowed by German Communists in early 1920s and used with German lyrics.

German Nazis also borrowed the melody, changed a couple of chords, and wrote their own lyrics to the song. The new march under the title "Herbei zum Kampf" also known under the title "Das Berliner Jungarbeiterlied," it was used by the Sturmabteilung (English: Storm Troopers) from 1929 to 1945.

The melody to the march was used during World War II in Yugoslav Macedonia in a song titled "In the struggle, the Macedonian people!" (Macedonian: Во борба, македонски народе!).

In the pro-Soviet German Democratic Republic, the march was used from the late 1950s until 1990, with the original Soviet music and new German lyrics dedicated to the Soviet Air Force.

== Lyrics ==
Russian original

Мы рождены, чтоб сказку сделать былью,
Преодолеть пространство и простор,
Нам разум дал стальные руки-крылья,
А вместо сердца – пламенный мотор.

Припев:
Всё выше, и выше, и выше
Стремим мы полёт наших птиц,
И в каждом пропеллере дышит
Спокойствие наших границ.

Бросая ввысь свой аппарат послушный
Или творя невиданный полёт,
Мы сознаем, как крепнет флот воздушный,
Наш первый в мире пролетарский флот!

Припев

Наш острый взгляд пронзает каждый атом,
Наш каждый нерв решимостью одет;
И, верьте нам, на каждый ультиматум
Воздушный флот сумеет дать ответ.

Припев

Romanization of Russian

My rozhdeny, chtob skazku sdelat bylyu,
Preodolet prostranstvo i prostor,
Nam razum dal stalnye ruki-krylya,
A vmesto serdtsa – plamenny motor.

Pripev:
Vsyo vyshe, i vyshe, i vyshe
Stremim my polyot nashikh ptits,
I v kazhdom propellere dyshit
Spokoystviye nashikh granits.

Brosaya vvys svoy apparat poslushny
Ili tvorya nevidanny polyot,
My soznayem, kak krepnet flot vozdushny,
Nash pervy v mire proletarsky flot!

Pripev

Nash ostry vzglyad pronzayet kazhdy atom,
Nash kazhdy nerv reshimostyu odet;
I, verte nam, na kazhdy ultimatum
Vozdushny flot sumeyet dat otvet.

Pripev

English translation

We were born to make fairy tales real
To overcome space and vastness.
Our mind gave us wings of steel;
In lieu of the heart, a motor that blazes.

Chorus:
Higher, higher, and higher,
We strive for the flight of our birds.
And in every propeller breathes
The accord of our frontiers.

Tossing up his loyal gear,
Or forging a fantastic flight.
We notice our fleet's getting stronger,
The world's first proletarian fleet!

Chorus

Our sharp gaze pierces every atom,
Our every nerve's dressed with bravery;
And believe us on every ultimatum,
Our Air Force shall be able to answer.

Chorus

== See also ==
- Hymn of the Bolshevik Party
- Royal Air Force March Past
- "The U.S. Air Force"
