= Volk ans Gewehr =

1931 Nazi song by Arno Pardun

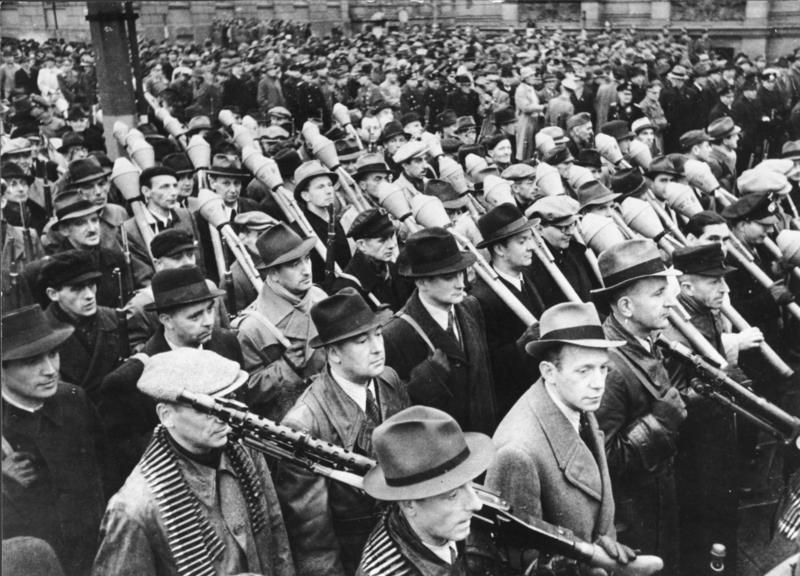
Volkssturm marching, November 1944

"Volk ans Gewehr" ("People to Arms") was the refrain of the very popular 1931 Nazi song "Siehst du im Osten das Morgenrot" ("Do You See Dawn in the East"). The song was written by Arno Pardun, who dedicated it to Joseph Goebbels. It strongly alludes to the well known workers' song "Brüder, zur Sonne, zur Freiheit" ("Brothers, to the Sun, to Freedom"), a German communist song later adopted by the Nazi Party.

== History ==
The song, which was characterized by a hammering march rhythm, was first heard at a rally in the Berlin Sportpalast on 8 January 1932 by about 150 Sturmabteilung (SA) people of Standard 7 and performed publicly by the Fuhsel band. In the following years, it became one of the most played National Socialist songs.

Pardun's song was one of the most famous mass songs of the Nazi era; in the 1930s, it was mainly used as an SA marching song. It was also a compulsory song for the Reichsarbeitsdienst. During World War II, it was used as a military song – not least because it was included in the soldier's song book Morgen marschieren wir (Tomorrow we march). The song was used as the interval signal of Reichssender Berlin. In 1944, the song was played at the inauguration of the Volkssturm. A Swedish translation of the song, Folk i gevär, was adopted as an anthem by the Nationalsocialistiska Arbetarepartiet.

The decisive bars of the song were used shortly after the Nazi seizure of power by the Berlin radio station. Lectures at German universities or student council meetings also started with the song after 1933. Thus, people were constantly reminded of this song. The historian Jutta Sywottek describes this as a subtle educational tool of the National Socialists for propaganda and preparation for war.

At the Nuremberg trials of the major German war criminals, this song was used as evidence.

== Text and melody ==
Verse	German	English
1	Siehst du im Osten das Morgenrot? Ein Zeichen zur Freiheit, zur Sonne! Wir halten zusammen, ob lebend, ob tot, mag kommen, was immer da wolle! Warum jetzt noch zweifeln, hört auf mit dem Hadern, Noch fließt uns deutsches Blut in den Adern. Volk, ans Gewehr! Volk, ans Gewehr!	Do you see the dawn in the east? A sign of freedom, the sun! We stick together, from life until death, let come forth whatever wishes to come forth! Why still doubt now, cease with the quarrelling, for there still flows German blood in our veins. People, to arms! People, to arms!
2	Viele Jahre zogen dahin. Geknechtet das Volk und betrogen. Verräter und Juden sie hatten Gewinn, sie forderten Opfer Legionen. Im Volke geboren erstand uns ein Führer, gab Glaube und Hoffnung an Deutschland uns wieder. Volk, ans Gewehr! Volk, ans Gewehr!	Many years passed by. The people were subjugated and betrayed. Traitors and Jews made their profits, demanding legions of victims. Born among the people, a leader arose to us and gave faith and hope to Germany again. People, to arms! People, to arms!
3	Deutscher, wach auf nun und reihen dich ein, wir schreiten dem Siege entgegen! Frei soll die Arbeit und frei woll’n wir sein und mutig und trotzig-verwegen. Wir ballen die Fäuste und werden es wagen, es gibt kein Zurück mehr und keiner darf zagen! Volk, ans Gewehr! Volk, ans Gewehr!	German, awake now and join in the ranks, we are moving towards victory! Work should be free and we want to be free and courageous and defiantly daring. We clench our fists and dare willingly, there is no turning back and no hesitation! People, to arms! People, to arms!
4	Jugend und Alter und Mann für Mann, umklammern das Hakenkreuzbanner. Ob Bürger, ob Bauer, ob Arbeitsmann, sie schwingen das Schwert und den Hammer. Für Hitler, für Freiheit, für Arbeit und Brot, Deutschland erwache und Juda den Tod! Volk, ans Gewehr! Volk, ans Gewehr!	Young and old and man after man, still clench to the Hooked Cross banner. Bourgeois, peasant, or working man, they're swinging the sword and the hammer. For Hitler, for freedom, for work and bread, Germany awake and death to Judea! People, to arms! People, to arms!

The text contains allusions to numerous cornerstones of Nazi ideology, such as the demand for the creation of living space in the east (“Do you see the dawn in the east”), sharp anti-Jewish sentiment (“Germany awake and death to Judah”) and the invocation of the entire people to aid the war effort ("People to arms, people to arms!"), as well as the popular workers' song Brothers, to the sun, to freedom, for example in the first line.

The slogan People to arms goes back to a poem from 1820 ("Freedom, your tree is rotting/everyone on the begging stick/soon bites into the hunger grave/people's rifle"). The melody has a minor character, fifth and fourth structures, as well as echoes of church modes of the 19th century song type. The song was "exposed to the accusation of being un-German, Russian or Bolshevik". Above all, the power of the chorus line gives the battle song its effect.

== Legal position ==
The performance of this song in public is prohibited in Germany according to Section 86a of the Criminal Code. In Austria, comparable provisions apply due to Section 3 of the Prohibition Act of 1947.
