= Brüder, zur Sonne, zur Freiheit =

1920 German song by Hermann Scherchen

"Brüder, zur Sonne, zur Freiheit" (Brothers, to the sun, to freedom) is a German song, a re-writing of the Russian revolutionary song Bravely, comrades, in step! (Russian: Смело, товарищи, в ногу!, romanized: Smelo, tovarišči, v nogu!), which Leonid Radin wrote during 1895/96 while he was in Taganka Prison, Moscow.

== History ==
Radin used the student song Slowly moving time Russian: Медленно движется время, romanized: Medlenno dvižetsja vremja, to which Ivan Sawvich Nikitin wrote the text in September 1857, published in 1858 under the title Песня ("song") in the Russian magazine Russian Conversation Russian: Русская беседа, romanized: Russkaja beseda. Radin also changed the rhythm of the previous slow waltz melody to a brisk and combative march.

The Russian song was first sung by political prisoners on the march to the Siberian exile in 1898. The song quickly became known for its rousing nature, but also because of the origin of its melody: In the 1905 Russian Revolution and the October Revolution 1917 it became an anthem in Russia. Radin himself never experienced either; he died in 1900 at the age of 39.

The German conductor Hermann Scherchen, director of a workers' choir, learned the song in Russian captivity in 1917 and created a German version in 1918. The Schubert Choir premiered it in Berlin on September 21, 1920. While Radin wrote seven stanzas, Scherchen's German version only included three. During the time of the Weimar Republic a fourth and a fifth stanza by unknown authors were written.

In 1921 the song even appeared in a religious hymn book. The Sonnenlieder edited by Eberhard Arnold, until today the hymn book of the Pacifist Anabaptist Bruderhofgemeinschaft (Brotherhood Community), uses the song as hymn 63. The last line of the third stanza was, however, changed by Erich Mohr (1895–1960). For Hermann Scherchen, the German translator of the workers' song, the final verse is Brüder, in eins nun die Hände, / Brüder, das Sterben verlacht! / Ewig, der Sklaverei ein Ende, / heilig die letzte Schlacht! [Brothers, now the hands united to one, / Brothers, laughing at death! / Forever, an end to slavery, / holy be the last battle!]; in the Sun Songs the last verse reads Heilig der Liebe Macht! [Holy be the power of love!]

The Nazi Party reappropriated the popular song, first with a specially adapted fourth stanza, then in 1927, it was converted to "Brüder in Zechen und Gruben" [Brothers in Pits and Mines], one of the best known propaganda songs in Nazi Germany, as well as "Brüder formiert die Kolonnen" [Brothers Form the Columns], a song by the Sturmabteilung. In the propaganda song "Volk ans Gewehr" [People to the rifle!], the second line also refers to this song: Ein Zeichen zur Freiheit, zur Sonne! [a sign of freedom, to the sun!].
