= Erika (song) =

1938 German marching song

"Erika" (German: [ˈeːʁɪka]), also known by "Auf der Heide" (On the Heath), is a German marching song with words and music by Herms Niel and published in 1938 during the Nazi regime. The song was then soon used as a soldier song by the Wehrmacht. According to British soldier, historian and author Major General Michael Tillotson, it was the most popular marching song in Germany during the Second World War.

== Origins ==
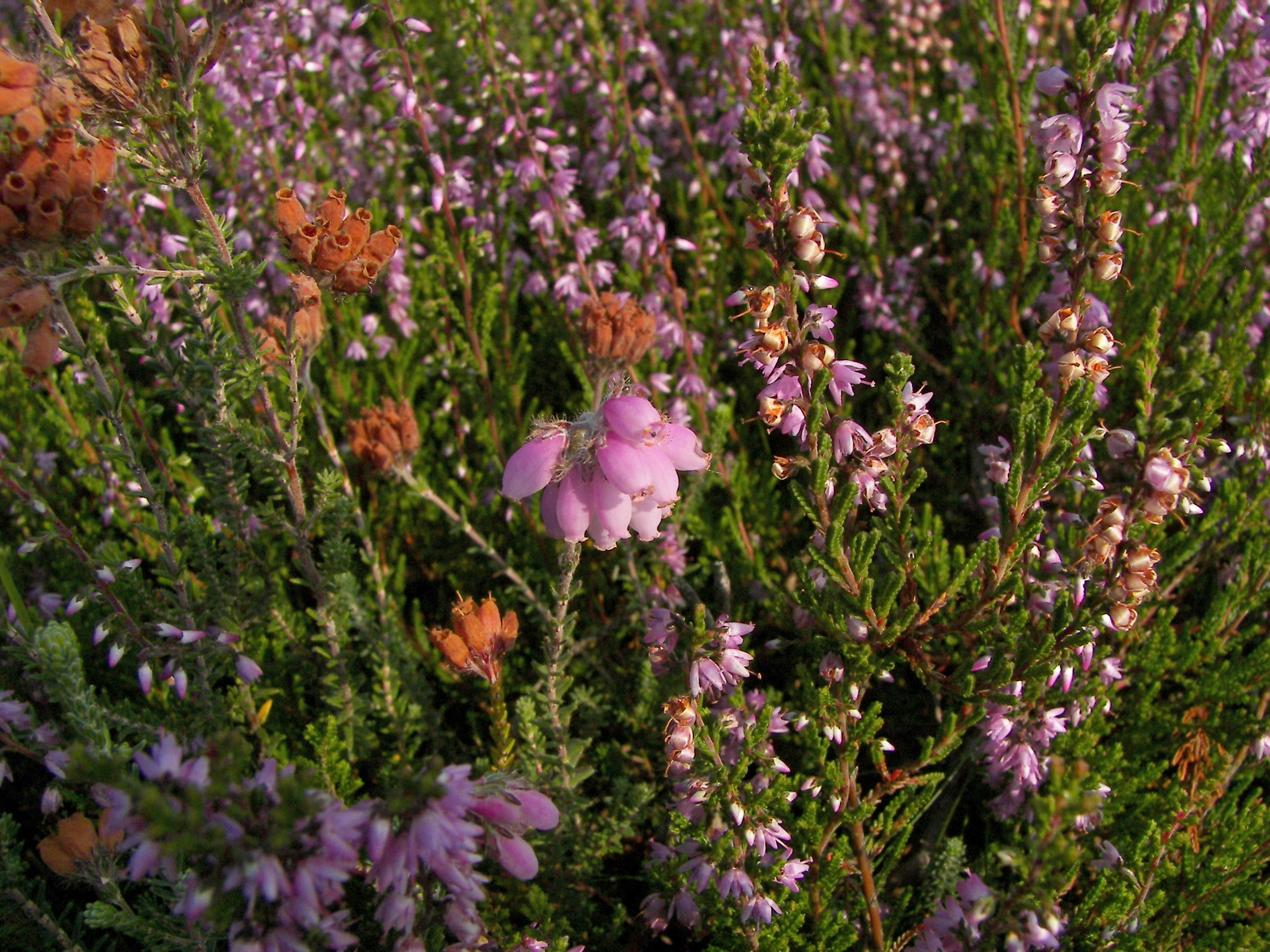
Erica tetralix, "Erika"

The exact year of the song's origin is not known; often the date is given as "about 1930", but this has never been substantiated. The song was originally published in 1938 by the publishing firm Carl Louis Oertel in Großburgwedel, a village northeast of Hanover, Lower Saxony. In an interview with Herms Niel in the Viennese newspaper: Das Kleine Volksblatt, Niel recounts that in the summer of 1938 he was suddenly inspired to write the song after an amusing misadventure during a walk where his dog encountered a wasp nest.

== Music ==
"Erika" is both a common German female name and the German word for heather. After each line, and after each time the name "Erika" is sung, there is a three-beat pause, which is filled by the timpani or stamping feet (e.g., of marching soldiers), shown as (xxx) in the text below.

== Lyrics ==
1. Auf der Heide blüht ein kleines Blümelein (xxx)
und das heißt (xxx) Erika. (xxx)
Heiß von hunderttausend kleinen Bienelein (xxx)
wird umschwärmt (xxx) Erika. (xxx)
Denn ihr Herz ist voller Süßigkeit, (xxx)
zarter Duft entströmt dem Blütenkleid. (xxx)
Auf der Heide blüht ein kleines Blümelein (xxx)
und das heißt (xxx) Erika. (xxx)
(xxx) as before
2. In der Heimat wohnt ein kleines Mägdelein
und das heißt Erika.
Dieses Mädel ist mein treues Schätzelein
und mein Glück, Erika.
Wenn das Heidekraut rot-lila blüht,
singe ich zum Gruß ihr dieses Lied.
Auf der Heide blüht ein kleines Blümelein
und das heißt: Erika.

3. In mein'm Kämmerlein blüht auch ein Blümelein
und das heißt Erika.
Schon beim Morgengrau'n sowie beim Dämmerschein
schaut's mich an, Erika.
Und dann ist es mir, als spräch' es laut:
"Denkst du auch an deine kleine Braut?"
In der Heimat weint um dich ein Mägdelein
und das heißt Erika.

Translation:

On the heath, there blooms a little flower fine (xxx)
and it's called (xxx) Erika. (xxx)
Eagerly a hundred thousand little bees (xxx)
swarm around (xxx) Erika. (xxx)
For her heart is full of sweetness, (xxx)
a tender scent escapes her blossom-gown. (xxx)
On the heath, there blooms a little flower (xxx)
and it's called (xxx) Erika. (xxx)

Back at home, there lives a little maiden
and she's called Erika.
That girl is my faithful little darling
and my joy, Erika.
When the heather blooms in a reddish purple,
I sing her this song in greeting.
On the heath, there blooms a little flower
and she's called Erika.

In my room, there also blooms a little flower
and she's called Erika.
Already in the grey of dawn, as it does at dusk,
It looks at me, Erika.
And then it's to me as if it's saying aloud:
"Are you thinking of your little bride?"
Back at home, a maiden weeps for you
and she's called Erika.

== Controversies around the song ==
- In June 2025, members of the University of Warwick Conservative Association (UWCA) sang and danced to this song during an annual event. University of Warwick representatives condemned the actions of the students. The association stressed that it was requested by a single member who was "no longer welcome", and apologised for any offense caused.
- In December 2025, the chair and a university student councilor representing conservative student party Vrijmoedige Studentenpartij (VSP) at the Vrije Universiteit Amsterdam were arrested for involvement in physically assaulting another student. Witnesses reported that that the assault happened after the victim criticised the VSP representatives for singing "Erika"; and furthermore, that those representatives were discussing esoteric neo-Nazi beliefs.
- During the 2026 Saxony-Anhalt state election on 6 September, the official AfD YouTube channel played a "New Wave Edit" of "Erika" by the music project Die Fiedel during its election-night broadcast.
