= Herms Niel =

German composer (1888–1954)

- Niel in Reichsarbeitsdienst uniform
- Born: Ferdinand Friedrich Hermann Nielebock; 17 April 1888; Nielebock, Province of Saxony, Kingdom of Prussia, German Empire
- Died: 16 July 1954 (aged 66); Lingen, Lower Saxony, West Germany
- Military career
- Allegiance: German Empire (1906–1918); Weimar Republic (until 1933); Nazi Germany (until 1945)

Ferdinand Friedrich Hermann Nielebock (17 April 1888 – 16 July 1954), known as Herms Niel, was a German composer of military songs and marches.

== Biography ==
Upon finishing school in 1902, Niel completed his apprenticeship with the Genthin choirmaster Adolf Büchner. In October 1906, he joined the Imperial German Army and was admitted as a trombonist and oboist in the 1st Infantry Regiment of the Guard (1. Garderegiment zu Fuss) in Potsdam. During the First World War, he was bandmaster of the 423rd German Infantry Regiment. In 1919, he was demobilized and worked as an official in the administration until 1927. That same year, he co-founded in Potsdam the Ritterschaftsorchester (the Knights' Orchestra), where he was composer and lyricist.

After the Nazis seized power, Niel, in 1933, joined their party as member 2,171,788. He became a Sturmabteilung troop leader, before receiving a promotion to band leader of the Reichsarbeitsdienst (RAD) training establishment in Potsdam.

During the period of National Socialism, he dedicated himself to composing marches and songs, which were popularized by the NSDAP and widely distributed on all fronts of the Second World War. At the Nazi party rallies in Nuremberg he was the conductor of all RAD music bands.

Niel also invented and designed a fanfare trumpet, known as the Herms Niel-Doppelfanfare, in E and B flat, which was manufactured in 1938 by Ernst Hess Nachf, an accordion factory in Klingenthal.

In 1941 he composed the score Sieg Heil Viktoria for the Waffen-SS.

During the postwar era, Niel lived in Lingen, where he died in 1954.

== Works ==
- "Adlerlied"
- "Antje, mein blondes Kind"
- "Das Engellandlied" (1939), lyrics: Hermann Löns)
- "Die ganze Kompanie"
- "Du Schönste von Städtel, schwarzbraunes Mädeli
- "Es blitzen die stählernen Schwingen"
- "Erika (Auf der Heide blüht ein kleines Blümelein)" (1938)
- "Es geht ums Vaterland"
- "Es ist so schön, Soldat zu sein, Rosemarie"
- "Es war ein Edelweiß"
- "Edelweißmarsch"
- "Fallschirmjägerlied"
- "Fliegerkuss"
- "Frühmorgens singt die Amsel"
- "Gerda – Ursula – Marie"
- "Hannelore Marschlied"
- "Heut´ sind wir wieder unter uns"
- "Heut’ stechen wir ins blaue Meer"
- "Heute muß ich scheiden"
- "Im Osten pfeift der Wind"
- "In der Heimat steh’n auf Posten"
- "Jawoll, das stimmt, jawoll"
- "Kamerad, wir marschieren gen Westen"
- "Liebchen adé (Annemarie-Polka)" (1934)
- "Liebling, wenn ich traurig bin…"
- "Marie - Mara - Maruschkaka!"
- "Matrosenlied"
- "Mein Bismarckland"
- "Mit Mercedes Benz voran"
- "Rosalinde"
- "Rosemarie (Rosemarie, ich lieb' dich gar so sehr)"
- "Ruck Zuck"
- "Sieg Heil Viktoria"
- "Stuka über Afrika"
- "Unsere Flagge"
- "Veronika - Marie"
- "Waltraut ist ein schönes Mädchen"
- "Wenn die Sonne scheint, Annemarie (Die Landpartie)"
- "Tschingta, Tschingta, Bummtara"
