= Clio (disambiguation) =

Clio is the muse of history in Greek mythology.

Clio may also refer to:

== Mythology ==
- Clio (mythology), various women in Greek mythology

== Places ==
=== United States ===
- Clio, Alabama, a city
- Clio, California, a census-designated place
- Clio, Iowa, a city
- Clio, Louisiana, an unincorporated community
- Clio, Michigan, a city
- Clio, South Carolina, a town
- Clio, West Virginia, an unincorporated community

=== Elsewhere ===
- Clio Bay, Lavoisier Island, Antarctica
- Clio Glacier, Scott Coast, Antarctica
- Clio Channel, between Turnour and West Cracroft Islands, British Columbia, Canada

== People ==
- Clio Barnard (born 1965), British film director
- Clio Maria Bittoni (1934–2024), Italian jurist
- Clio Hinton Bracken (1870–1925), American sculptor
- Clio Goldsmith (born 1957), French actress
- Clio Gould, English violinist and leader of the Royal Philharmonic Orchestra
- Clio Lloyd (1864–1921), American Chief Clerk of the California Assembly and newspaper publisher
- Leslie Clio (born 1986), German singer, songwriter, music video director and producer
- Thomas 'Clio' Rickman (1760–1834), Quaker writer and Headstrong Club member

== Science and technology ==
- CLIO (Cryogenic Laser Interferometer Observatory), a gravitational wave detector prototype
- Clio (gastropod), a genus of sea snails
- Vadem Clio, a handheld PC
- Clio, code name of the HTC Shift, an ultra-mobile PC released in 2008

== Ships ==
- HMS Clio, three Royal Navy ships
- Italian ship Clio, three Italian Navy ships
- Clio (barque), a 19th-century sailing ship
- MV Clio, a German cargo ship built in 1939

== Other uses ==
- Clio (Hendrik Goltzius), a 1592 engraving
- Clio Art Fair, a contemporary art fair staged bi-annually in New York City and Los Angeles
- Clio Awards, an award for advertising, design, and communication
- Clio Cosmetics, a Korea cosmetics company
- Clio (software company), a legal technology company
- Renault Clio, a French car
- Honda Clio, a sales distribution channel for Honda cars
- Clio Area School District, a public school district in Michigan, United States, including the city of Clio
- Clio (Italian project) was an Italian disco project voiced by singer Maria Chiara Perugini and run by producer Roberto Ferrante (Italian)

== See also ==
- Cleo (disambiguation)
- Kleo (disambiguation)
- Klio (disambiguation)
- Clyo, Georgia
- Clio-Danae Othoneou (born 1979), Greek actress and musician
- Kleio: A Journal of Historical Studies from Africa
