= Cleo =

Cleo may refer to:

== Entertainment and media ==
=== Film and TV ===
- Cleo (2019 Belgian film), a drama
- Cleo (2019 German film), a drama
- Snowtime!, released as Cleo in the United Kingdom, a 2015 Canadian animated film
- Cleo (TV series), a Swedish comedy television series broadcast during 2002 and 2003
- Cleo TV, an American cable television network targeting Millennial and Gen X black women
- Miss Cleo, a television psychic and entertainer

=== Other entertainment and media ===
- "Cleo", a song from the 1994 album There's Nothing Wrong with Love by Built to Spill
- Cleo (group), a South Korean girl group formed in 1999
- Cleo (magazine), an Australian magazine established in 1972, now active in Indonesia, Malaysia, Singapore, and Thailand
- Cleo (play), by Lawrence Wright

== Science and technology ==
- CLEO (particle detector), operated by physicists at Cornell University
- CLEO (router), a satellite payload extending the Internet into space
- "CLEO" (Clear Language for Expressing Orders), the programming language for the LEO computer
- Cleo Communications, a B2B integration software company
- Cleo (mathematician), a pseudonym of a mathematician

== Other uses ==
- Cleo (name), including a list of people and fictional characters bearing the given name Cleo
- Cléo Pires, mononymously known as Cleo, Brazilian actress and singer
- Cleo, one of the most popular cat names for a female pet domestic cat
- Chief of police (CLEO, local Chief Law Enforcement Officer)
- Hurricane Cleo (disambiguation)
- USS Cleo (SP-232), a United States Navy patrol vessel in service from 1917 to 1918

== See also ==
- Clea (disambiguation)
- Clio (disambiguation)
- Kleo (disambiguation)
- Klio (disambiguation)
- Cleopatra (disambiguation)
