= Genocides in history (before 1490) =

Overview of genocides before 1914

Genocide is the intentional destruction of a people (Note: Defined under the Genocide Convention as "national, ethnical, racial, or religious group.") in whole or in part. The term was coined in 1944 by Raphael Lemkin. It is defined in Article 2 of the Convention on the Prevention and Punishment of the Crime of Genocide (CPPCG) of 1948 as "any of the following acts committed with intent to destroy, in whole or in part, a national, ethnical, racial, or religious group, as such: killing members of the group; causing serious bodily or mental harm to members of the group; deliberately inflicting on the group conditions of life calculated to bring about its physical destruction in whole or in part; imposing measures intended to prevent births within the group; [and] forcibly transferring children of the group to another group."

The preamble to the CPPCG states that "genocide is a crime under international law, contrary to the spirit and aims of the United Nations and condemned by the civilized world", and it also states that "at all periods of history genocide has inflicted great losses on humanity." Genocide is widely considered to be the epitome of human evil, and has been referred to as the "crime of crimes". The Political Instability Task Force estimated that 43 genocides occurred between 1956 and 2016, resulting in 50 million deaths. The UNHCR estimated that a further 50 million had been displaced by such episodes of violence.

== Definitions of genocide ==
The debate continues over what legally constitutes genocide. One definition is any conflict that the International Criminal Court has so designated. Mohammed Hassan Kakar argues that the definition should include political groups or any group so defined by the perpetrator. He prefers the definition from Frank Chalk and Kurt Jonassohn, which defines genocide as "a form of one-sided mass killing in which a state or other authority intends to destroy a group so defined by the perpetrator."

In literature, some scholars have popularly emphasized the role that the Soviet Union played in excluding political groups from the international definition of genocide, which is contained in the Genocide Convention of 1948, and in particular they have written that Joseph Stalin may have feared greater international scrutiny of the political killings that occurred in the country, such as the Great Purge; however, this claim is not supported by evidence. The Soviet view was shared and supported by many diverse countries, and they were also in line with Raphael Lemkin's original conception, (Note: By 1951, Lemkin was saying that the Soviet Union was the only state that could be indicted for genocide; his concept of genocide, as it was outlined in Axis Rule in Occupied Europe, covered Stalinist deportations as genocide by default, and differed from the adopted Genocide Convention in many ways. From a 21st-century perspective, its coverage was very broad, and as a result, it would classify almost any gross human rights violation as a genocide, and many events that were deemed genocidal by Lemkin did not amount to genocide under the convention. As the Cold War began, this change was the result of Lemkin's turn to anti-communism in an attempt to convince the United States to ratify the Genocide Convention.) and it was originally promoted by the World Jewish Congress.

== Historiography ==
According to Canadian scholar Adam Jones, if a dominant group of people had little in common with a marginalised group of people, it was easy for the dominant group to define the other as subhuman. As a result, the marginalised group might be labeled as a threat that must be eliminated. Jones continues: "The difficulty, as Frank Chalk and Kurt Jonassohn pointed out in their early study, is that such historical records as exist are ambiguous and undependable. While history today is generally written with some fealty to 'objective' facts, most previous accounts aimed rather to praise the writer's patron (normally the leader) and to emphasise the superiority of one's own gods and religious beliefs."

Chalk and Jonassohn wrote that: "Historically and anthropologically peoples have always had a name for themselves. In a great many cases, that name meant 'the people' to set the owners of that name off against all other people who were considered of lesser quality in some way. If the differences between the people and some other society were particularly large in terms of religion, language, manners, customs, and so on, then such others were seen as less than fully human: pagans, savages, or even animals."

== Pre-history ==
=== Neanderthal genocide ===
Yarin Eski, a criminologist at Vrije Universiteit Amsterdam, argues that "genocidal violence and mass exploitation are perhaps the defining characteristics of being human," and he also describes how our talent for murder put an end to the Neanderthals, and it has also colored all subsequent human history. Similarly, Kwang Hyun Ho stresses the fact that modern humans possess a mutated gene which is related to aggression and combined with fossil evidence, the possession of it by early modern humans proves that the Neanderthals were killed in acts of violence which were committed by early modern humans. The first person to publish an analysis of a Neanderthal, French paleontologist Marcellin Boule, was also the first to suppose (in 1912) that early humans violently replaced Neanderthals. In particular, larger tribal groupings and projectile weapons were supposed to give modern humans an edge in violent conflicts with Neanderthals and other indigenous populations of archaic humans that allowed early modern humans to wipe out other hominin species as they spread out of Africa. This view is at odds with the much more supported view that Neanderthal extinction occurred due to events such as interbreeding, inbreeding, disease, and climate change. Archaeologist Helle Vandkilde highlights the fact that the form of trauma that is indicative of interpersonal violence is only present in approximately 20 sets of Neanderthal and Homo sapiens skeletal remains which date back to the Palaeolithic.

=== Chiefdom genocides ===
The percentages of male deaths caused by war in eight tribal societies. (Lawrence H. Keeley, War Before Civilization)

Historian Max Ostrovsky concludes that chiefdoms performed the most genocidal warfare in human history and practiced this kind of warfare all over the world, wherever culture reached the level of chiefdom. He based his conclusion on anthropological researches and notes that Thomas Malthus collected many reports on genocidal wars by chiefdoms.

Malthus regards chiefdoms as an intermediate stage between independent tribes and states. By contrast to independent tribes, chiefdoms cumulated power after their decisive military victories but they did not learn to enslave their defeated enemies yet. Hence, according to Malthus, chiefdoms simply slaughtered them: "Their object of war is not conquest but destruction... Among the Iroquois, the phrase by which they express their resolution to make war against an enemy is 'let us go and eat that nation.'" The verb "eat" has a literal meaning. The cannibalism of chiefdoms appears in the military genocidal context which is referred to as "post-battle rage" rather than hunger. Immanuel Kant supposed that slavery and imperialism appeared at a later, albeit equally savage, stage, when peoples learned "how to make better use of their conquered enemies than to dine off them." Jared Diamond offered a similar explanation, arguing that enslavement of defeated groups could only be introduced at an advanced stage because it required feeding, guarding, and organising slaves for work, and tribal societies could not do these things and hence opted to kill all of the defeated.

Ostrovsky found that the hypothesis of chiefdom genocide applies to the Israelites of the Judges period (c. 1150–1025 BCE) when they formed a chiefdom (of twelve tribes): When Israel defeats the Canaanite nations, the tradition commands, "you must devote them to complete destruction. You shall make no covenant with them and show no mercy to them" (Deuteronomy 7:1–2). Similarly to the chiefdoms which are described in the Age of Discovery, the genocide of the Hebrew ban was total which means that it extended to women, children and domestic animals (1 Samuel 15:3). "[You] must not leave anything that breathes" (Deuteronomy 20:16). The Bible exaggerates when it claims that the genocide of the Canaanite peoples (Joshua 10:40–41, 11:21–23, 6:18–19) was total, but, according to Ostrovsky, "whenever the Israelite chiefdom won, the vanquished did not survive." Given the vast data on chiefdom-level warfare, he finds the historicity of the Canaanite genocide credible.

Scholars devoted much of their attention to the Canaanite genocide and scholars of theology struggled to explain why Moses commanded the Israelites to wage a "genocidal" conquest of Canaan and the secular scholar Richard Dawkins characterises Yahweh as a "genocidal" and "blood thirsty ethnic cleanser." The genocides which were committed during the Judges period were partial genocides, such as the destruction of the Midianites by the Israelites (Numbers 31:7–18). Adam Jones notes that this massacre is an example of the partial destruction and the partial incorporation of an enemy ethnicity.

Julius Caesar's army waged a genocidal war against the Germanic chiefdoms (Gallic Wars 1:17). The Annales Bertiniani recorded the impression of survivors from the onslaught of the chiefdom of the Vikings: "Wild beasts... killing babies, children, young men, old men, fathers, sons and mothers... They overthrow, they despoil, they destroy, they burn, they ravage; sinister cohort, fatal phalanx, cruel host."

=== Gendercides ===
Scholars of antiquity differentiate genocides from gendercides, in which groups of people were conquered and the males who belonged to the conquered groups were killed but the children (particularly the girls) and the women were incorporated into the conquering groups. Jones notes, "Chalk and Jonassohn provide a wide-ranging selection of historical events such as the Assyrian Empire's root-and branch depredations in the first half of the first millennium BCE, and the destruction of Melos by Athens during the Peloponnesian War (431–404 BCE), a gendercidal rampage described by Thucydides in his 'Melian Dialogue'". Jones and Wendy Lower also detail how gendercides are a common feature through much classical literature in the western tradition. Additionally, Jones highlights in an article published in the Journal of Genocide Research in 2000, that the gender specific targeting of men for extermination has persisted through many cases of conflict in the 20th century.

=== Prehistoric Andes ===
In the Cambridge World History of Genocide, anthropologist and archaeologist Danielle Kurin wrote that there is archaeological evidence of genocidal violence at various points in time in the prehistoric Andes in South America.

== Ancient history ==
=== Destruction of Carthage ===
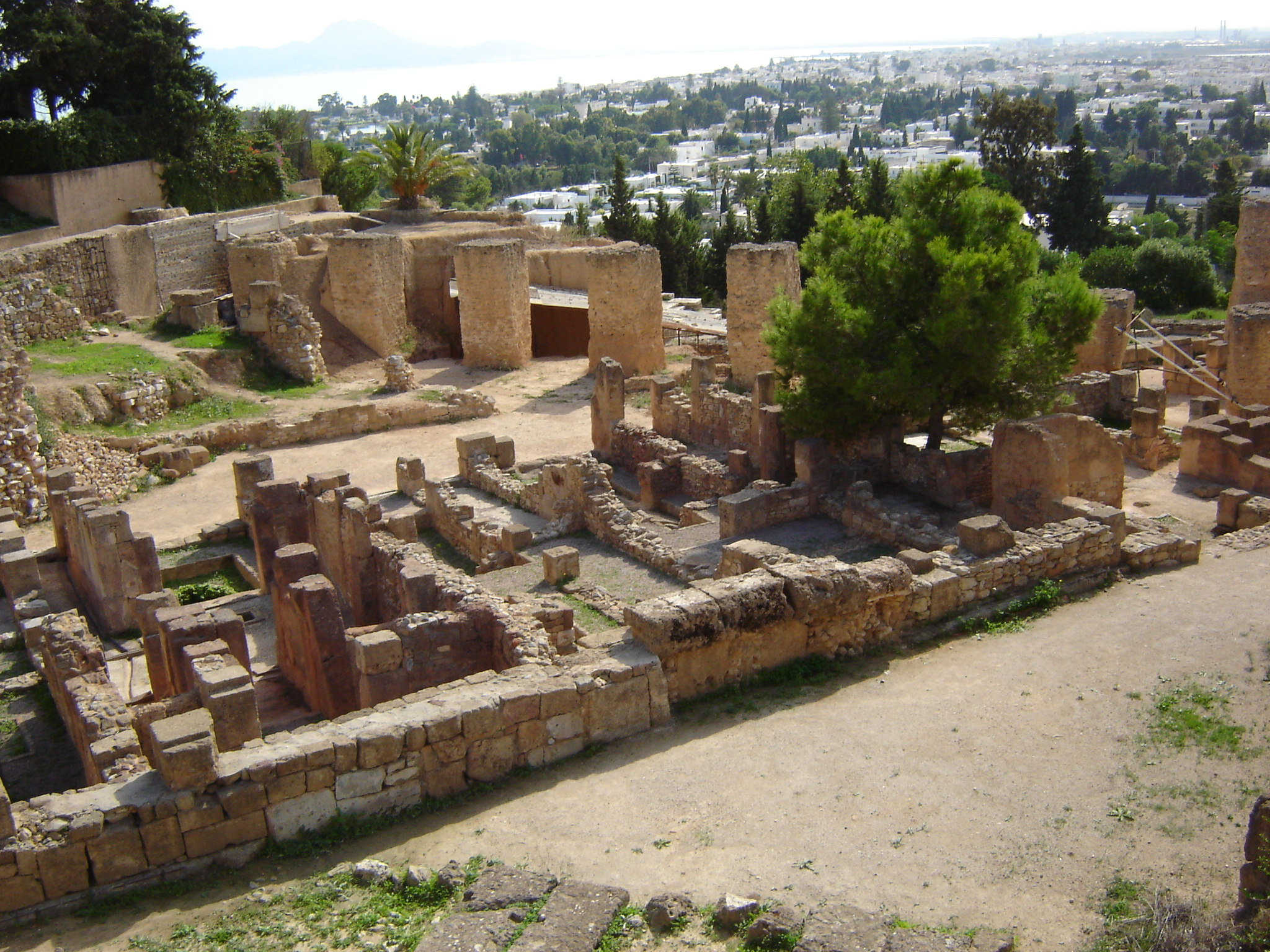
Ruins of the Punic district of Carthage

During the Third Punic War, the city of Carthage was besieged by Roman forces for three years (149–146 BCE). Once the city was breached, the Romans spent seven days systematically destroying it and killing its inhabitants. Ben Kiernan has labelled the devastation of the city and the massacre of its population "the first genocide". Kiernan highlights calls for the destruction of Carthage before the third Punic war, and escalating rhetoric during the siege, with Polybius stating in his report from the battle that the Carthaginians were "utterly exterminated". Scholars Bridget Conley and Alex de Waal, as well as Lemkin considered the destruction of Carthage to have been genocidal.

=== Asiatic Vespers ===
In 88 BCE, king Mithridates VI of Pontus ordered the murder of all Italics in Asia Minor, resulting in the deaths of about 100,000, mainly civilians. The death toll makes it one of the deadliest recorded genocides in classical antiquity. This action provoked the Romans, leading to the First Mithridatic War.

=== Julius Caesar's campaigns ===
Julius Caesar's campaign against the Tencteri and Usipetes has been characterised as a genocide. During the Gallic Wars Caesar reported that he burnt every village and building that he could find in the territory of the Eburones, drove off all of the cattle, and his men and beasts consumed all of the grain that the weather of the autumnal season had not destroyed. He left those who had hid themselves, if there were any, alive in the hope that they would all die of hunger in the winter. Caesar said that he wanted to annihilate the Eburones as well as their name. Their country was soon occupied by a Germanic tribe with a different name, the Tungri. However, the report by Tacitus which states that the Tungri were the original "Germani" who first crossed the Rhine, and the way this matches Caesar's description of the Eburones and their neighbours, leads to the possibility that they survived under a new name.

However, historian Johannes Heinrichs (2008) argues that the genocide of the Eburones in 53 BCE could not have happened as Caesar claimed. If the systematic destruction of infrastructure by the Roman forces was intended to prevent the local people from regaining power, the physical extermination of them proved to be impractical. The available areas of refuge which were hardly accessible to the Roman legions were numerous: the low mountain range of the Ardennes, the swamps and wastelands which were located towards the Menapii, the coastal islands, etc. Moreover, Caesar's second attempt to annihilate the tribe two years later is proof that the community survived, and its apparent ability to regenerate itself lead Caesar to believe that he needed to launch more raids against them. According to Nico Roymans, their disappearance from the political map may have resulted from "a policy of damnatio memoriae on the part of the Roman authorities, in combination with the confiscation of Eburonean territory". A great part of their gold fell into Roman hands during repeated Roman raids on the Eburones in 53–51 BCE, and then it was melted down and carried off.

=== Bar Kokhba revolt ===
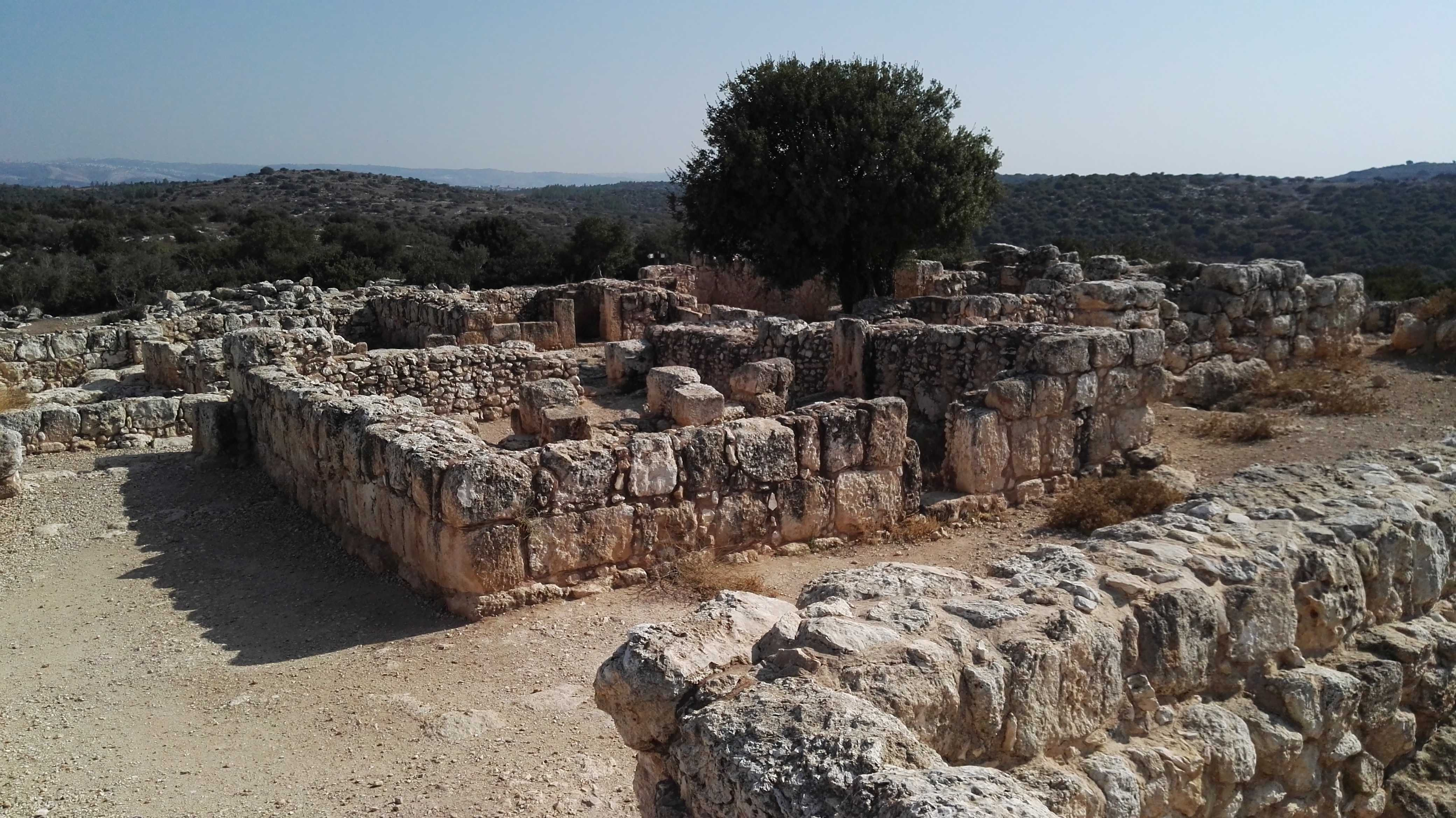
The ruins of Horvat 'Ethri display a destruction layer dating to the Bar Kokhba revolt (132–136 CE), along with a mass grave containing the remains of 15 individuals, including one with signs of beheading.

The Bar Kokhba revolt (Hebrew: מֶרֶד בַּר כּוֹכְבָא; Mered Bar Kokhba) was a rebellion against the Roman Empire by the Jews of the Roman province of Judea, led by Simon bar Kokhba. Waged from circa 132–136 CE, it was the last of three major Jewish–Roman wars. The revolt erupted as a result of religious and political tensions which existed in Judea since the end of the failed First Revolt in 66–73 CE. These tensions were exacerbated by the establishment of a large Roman military presence in Judea, changes in administrative life and the economy, together with the outbreak and suppression of Jewish revolts from Mesopotamia to Libya and Cyrenaica. The proximate reasons seem to be the construction of a new city, Aelia Capitolina, over the ruins of Jerusalem and the erection of a temple to Jupiter on the Temple Mount. The Church Fathers and rabbinic literature emphasise the role of Rufus, governor of Judea, in provoking the revolt. The Bar Kokhba revolt resulted in the extensive depopulation of Judean communities, more so than during the First Jewish–Roman War of 70 CE. According to Cassius Dio, 580,000 Jews perished in the war and many more died of hunger and disease. In addition, many Judean war captives were sold into slavery. The Jewish communities of Judea were devastated to an extent which some scholars describe as a genocide. However, the Jewish population remained strong in other parts of the Southern Levant, thriving in Galilee, Golan, Bet Shean Valley and the eastern, southern and western edges of Judea. Roman casualties were also considered heavy—XXII Deiotariana was disbanded after serious losses. In addition, some historians argue that Legio IX Hispana's disbandment in the mid-2nd century could have been a result of this war. In an attempt to erase any memory of Judea or Ancient Israel, Emperor Hadrian wiped the name off the map and replaced it with Syria Palaestina.

=== Jie and Wu Hu ===
The Later Zhao dynasty (319–351) was a Jie-led state that ruled most of northern China during the Sixteen Kingdoms period in the fourth century CE. At the time, northern China was home to many non-Han Chinese tribes collectively known in historiography as the Wu Hu or "Five Barbarians", of which the Jie were one of them. In its final years, the Later Zhao fell into civil war between members of the imperial family over the throne. One powerful member, Shi Min (later known as Ran Min), was an adopted Han Chinese, and in 350, he seized control of the emperor and capital, Ye through a coup.

After surviving multiple assassination attempts, Shi Min concluded that he could no longer trust the Jie and other non-Han people under his command. In late 350, he issued an order to kill any Jie or central Asians found in the city of Ye, rewarding any Han Chinese for killing any Jie or "barbarian" person they find. Shi Min personally led his army to massacre the tribes in the capital, while ordering his generals to purge their armies of tribespeople. The Jie were an ethnic group which possessed racial characteristics which included high-bridged noses and bushy beards, and as a result, they were easily identified and killed. However, many of the people killed were also mistakenly-identified Han Chinese. In total, 200,000 of them were reportedly massacred. The historians David Graff and Victoria Tin-Bor Hui both describe the actions of Shi Min as a "genocidal campaign", alongside historian Steven L. Jacobs who also considers it as an example of genocide.

== Middle Ages ==
=== Ancestral Puebloans ===
A 2010 study suggests that a group of Ancestral Puebloans in the American Southwest were killed in a genocide that took place circa 800 CE.

=== Harrying of the North ===
The Harrying of the North was a series of military campaigns waged by William the Conqueror in the winter of 1069–1070 to subjugate Northern England, where the presence of the last Wessex claimant, Edgar Ætheling, had encouraged Anglo-Saxon Northumbrian, Anglo-Scandinavian and Danish rebellions. William's strategy, implemented during the winter of 1069–70 (he spent Christmas 1069 in York), has been described by William E. Kapelle and some other modern scholars as an act of genocide. Medieval historian C. P. Lewis details how the consensus view of the Harrying of the North is that it was a particularly harsh course of action and that "modern labelling commonly falls not far short of genocide." Lewis also highlights how the limitations of the evidence available mean it is difficult to assess whether the Harrying of the North meets any of the frameworks of genocide.

=== Medieval anti-Jewish massacres ===
From the 11th century to the 16th century, hundreds of massacres were committed against Jewish communities in Europe. The historian Maya Soifer Irish details how these pogroms meet the criteria of "genocidal massacres" as developed by the genocide scholars Leo Kuper and Ben Kiernan.

=== 13th-century extermination of the Cathars ===
The Albigensian Crusade or the Cathar Crusade (1209–1229) was a 20-year-long military campaign which Pope Innocent III initiated to eliminate Catharism in Languedoc, in Southern France. The Crusade was primarily prosecuted by the French crown and it promptly took on a political flavour. It resulted in a significant reduction in the number of practising Cathars, and realigned the County of Toulouse in Languedoc, bringing it into the sphere of the French crown, and diminishing the distinct regional culture and high level of influence of the Counts of Barcelona.

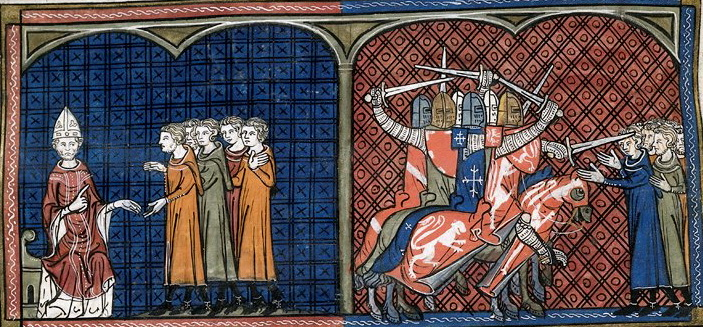
Pope Innocent III excommunicating the Albigensians (left). The Albigensians being massacred by the crusaders (right).

Raphael Lemkin, who coined the word "genocide" in the 20th century, referred to the Albigensian Crusade as "one of the most conclusive cases of genocide in religious history". Mark Gregory Pegg wrote that "The Albigensian Crusade ushered genocide into the West by linking divine salvation to mass murder, by making slaughter as loving an act as His sacrifice on the cross."

Robert E. Lerner argues that Pegg's classification of the Albigensian Crusade as a genocide is inappropriate, on the ground that it "was proclaimed against unbelievers ... not against a 'genus' or people; those who joined the crusade had no intention of annihilating the population of southern France ... If Pegg wishes to connect the Albigensian Crusade to modern ethnic slaughter, well—words fail me (as they do him)."

Laurence Marvin is not as dismissive as Lerner regarding Pegg's contention that the Albigensian Crusade was a genocide. He does however take issue with Pegg's argument that the Albigensian Crusade formed an important historical precedent for later genocides, including the Holocaust.

Kurt Jonassohn and Karin Solveig Björnson describe the Albigensian Crusade as "the first ideological genocide". Kurt Jonassohn and Frank Chalk, who together founded the Montreal Institute for Genocide and Human Rights Studies, include a detailed case study of the Albigensian Crusade in their genocide studies textbook The History and Sociology of Genocide: Analyses and Case Studies, authored by Joseph R. Strayer and Malise Ruthven.

In 2023, Pegg highlights in the Cambridge World History of Genocide, how since his 2008 work a variety of other scholars from different disciplinary backgrounds have concluded that the Albigensian crusade was genocidal in nature.

=== Mongol Empire ===
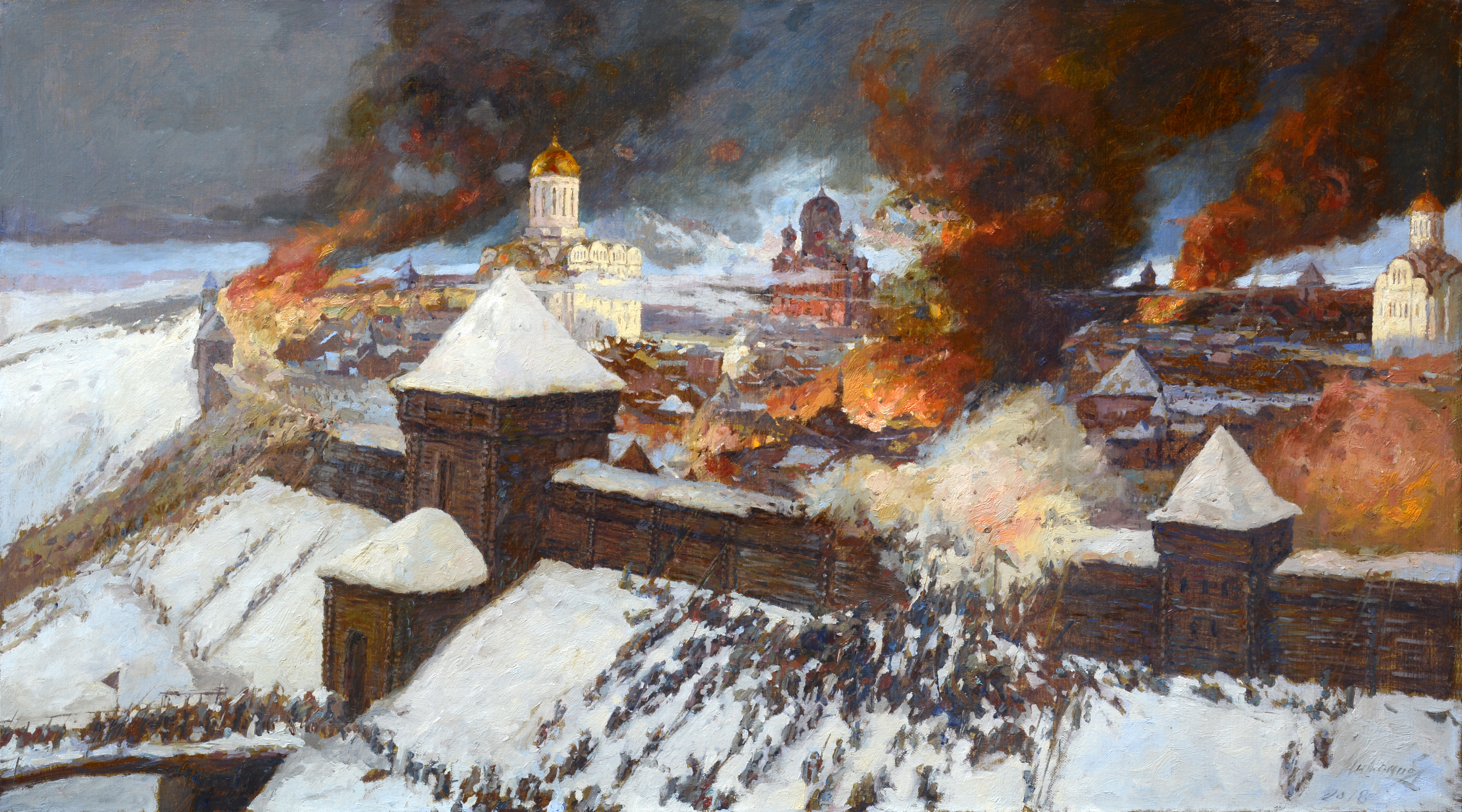
Siege of Ryazan during the Mongol invasion of Kievan Rus' in December 1237

Quoting Eric Margolis, Jones claims that in the 13th century, the Mongol armies under Genghis Khan were genocidal killers who were known to eradicate whole nations. He ordered the extermination of the Tata Mongols, and the extermination of all Kankali males in Bukhara who were "taller than a wheel" after he used a technique which was called measuring against the linchpin. In the end, half of the Mongol tribes were exterminated by Genghis Khan. Rosanne Klass referred to the Mongols' rule of Afghanistan as "genocide". It has been estimated that approximately 11% of the world's population was killed either during or immediately after the Turco-Mongol invasions (around 37.75 – 60 million people were killed during the genocide which was committed in Eurasia, out of which at least 35 million people were killed in China). If these calculations are accurate, these events would constitute the deadliest acts of mass killing in human history. The second campaign against the Western Xia, the final military action which was led by Genghis Khan, because he died during it, involved the intentional and systematic destruction of Western Xia cities and culture. According to John Man, because of this policy of total obliteration, Western Xia is little known to anyone other than experts in the field because very few records of the existence of that society still exist. He states that "There is a case to be made that this was the first ever recorded example of attempted genocide. It was certainly very successful ethnocide."

Historian and specialist on the Mongol empire, Timothy May, details how genocide scholars have been divided as to whether the Mongol conquests should be considered a case of genocide. He then argues that while the Mongols frequently employed massacres as a tool of war during their conquests, they could only be described as genocidal in some cases. Two Mongol military campaigns which can be considered genocidal are the massacre of the Tanguts at Zhongxing and the massacre of the Nizari Ismailis.

=== Tamerlane ===
Similarly, the extreme brutality of the Turco-Mongol conqueror Tamerlane was well-documented and his conquests were accompanied by genocidal massacres. William Rubinstein wrote: "In Assyria (1393–4)—Tamerlane got around—he killed all the Christians he could find, including everyone in the, then, Christian city of Tikrit, thus virtually destroying Assyrian Church of the East. Impartially, however, Tamerlane also slaughtered Shi'ite Muslims, Jews and heathens."

=== Mongols in the Delhi Sultanate ===
In 1311, the Delhi Sultanate's ruler Alauddin Khalji ordered a massacre of the "New Muslims" (Mongols who had recently converted to Islam), after some Mongol amirs of Delhi conspired to kill him. According to chronicler Ziauddin Barani, 20,000 or 30,000 Mongols were killed as a result of this order.

=== Guanches ===
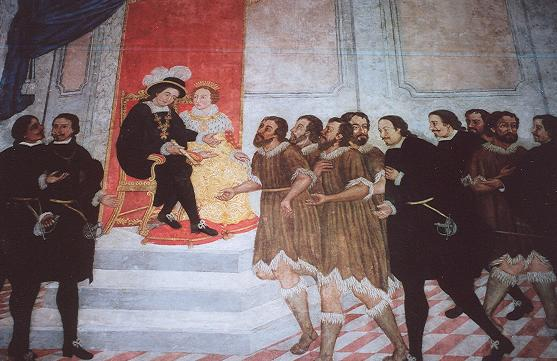
A painting depicting Alonso Fernández de Lugo presenting the captured Guanche kings of Tenerife to Ferdinand and Isabella, hanging in the city hall of San Cristóbal de La Laguna

The conquest of the Canary Islands by the Crown of Castille took place between 1402 and 1496. Initially carried out by Norman aristocrats on behalf of the Castilian nobility in exchange for a covenant of allegiance to the crown, the process was later carried out by the Spanish crown itself during the reign of the Catholic Monarchs.

Some historians have labelled the conquest genocidal in nature due to the brutal treatment of the Islands' indigenous Guanches which contributed to their extinction as a distinct group. Historian Francisco Morales Padrón wrote in 1978 that the conquest of the islands constituted a genocide. Historian Daniele Conversi locates the conquest of the Canary Islands within the history of colonial and imperial genocides. Genocide scholar Mark Levene has stated that while there was not the intent by the Castilian crown to commit genocide, the result of their conquest was the same as if they had intended to commit genocide. Historian and specialist in genocide studies Mohamed Adhikari published an article in 2017 analysing the settler colonial history of the Canary Islands as a case of genocide, saying that the Canary Islands were the scene of "Europe's first overseas settler colonial genocide," and that the mass killing and enslavement of natives, along with forced deportation, sexual violence and confiscation of land and children constituted an attempt to "destroy in whole" the Guanche people. The tactics used in the Canary Islands in the 15th century served as a model for the Iberian colonisation of the Americas.

== See also ==
- Accusation in a mirror
- Anti-communist mass killings
- Anti-Mongolianism
- Black genocide in the United States – the notion that African Americans have been subjected to genocide throughout their history because of racism against African Americans, an aspect of racism in the United States
- Crimes against humanity
- Criticism of communist party rule
- Democide
- Ethnic cleansing
- Ethnic conflict
- Ethnic violence
- Ethnocentrism
- Ethnocide
- Far-left politics
- Far-right politics
- Far-right subcultures
- Genocide denial
- Genocide recognition politics
- Genocide of Christians by the Islamic State
- Genocide of indigenous peoples
- Genocide of Yazidis by the Islamic State
- Hate crime
- Hate group
- Hate media
- Hate speech
- Hate studies
- Iraqi Turkmen genocide
- List of ethnic cleansing campaigns
- List of genocides
- Mass killings under communist regimes
- Mass racial violence in the United States
- Native American genocide in the United States — the notion that Native Americans have been subjected to genocide because of racism against them, another aspect of racism in the United States
- Nativism (politics)
- Persecution of Shias by the Islamic State
- Political cleansing of population – an aspect of political violence
- Population transfer
- Racism
- Religious intolerance
- Religious discrimination
- Religious persecution
- Religious violence
- Sectarian violence
- Supremacism
- Terrorism
- War crime
- Xenophobia

== Sources ==
- Adhikari, Mohamed (7 September 2017). "Europe's First Settler Colonial Incursion into Africa: The Genocide of Aboriginal Canary Islanders". African Historical Review. 49 (1): 1–26. doi:10.1080/17532523.2017.1336863. S2CID 165086773.
- ——— (2019). "Raiders, Slavers, Conquistadors, Settlers: Civilian-driven Violence in the Extermination of Aboriginal Canary Islanders". In Adhikari, Mohamed (ed.). Civilian-Driven Violence and the Genocide of Indigenous Peoples in Settler Societies. Routledge. pp. 31–60. doi:10.4324/9781003015550-2. ISBN 978-1-003-01555-0.
- ——— (25 July 2022). Destroying to Replace: Settler Genocides of Indigenous Peoples. Indianapolis: Hackett Publishing Company. pp. 1–32. ISBN 978-1-64792-054-8.
- Aquil, Raziuddin (2023). "Genocidal Massacres in Medieval India". In Kiernan, Ben; Lemos, T. M.; Taylor, Tristan S. (eds.). The Cambridge World History of Genocide. Vol. I: Genocide in the Ancient, Medieval and Premodern Worlds. Cambridge University Press. pp. 547–571. doi:10.1017/9781108655989.024. ISBN 978-1-108-65598-9.
- Bartrop, Paul R.; Totten, Samuel (2007). Dictionary of Genocide. with contributions by Steven Leonard Jacobs. ABC-CLIO. ISBN 978-0-313-34641-5.
- Ben-Sasson, H. H. (1976). A History of the Jewish People. Harvard University Press. ISBN 0-674-39731-2.
- Blench, Roger (2021). "The peopling of the Canaries by the Berbers: new data and new hypotheses". Études et Documents Berbères. 45–46: 149–173.
- Bohannan, Paul (1967). Law and Warfare: Studies in Anthropology of Conflict. New York: Natural History Press.
- Boule, Marcellin (1920). Les hommes fossils [Fossil men] (in French). Paris: Masson.
- Carneiro, Robert (1990). "Chiefdom-level warfare as exemplified in Fiji and the Cauca Valley". In Haas, Jonathan (ed.). Anthropology of War. New York: Cambridge University Press. ISBN 0-521-38042-1.
- Chalk, Frank Robert; Jonassohn, Kurt (1990). The History and Sociology of Genocide: Analyses and Case Studies. Yale University Press. ISBN 978-0-300-04446-1.
- Charny, Israel (1999). "Afghanistan, Genocide of". The Encyclopedia of Genocide. ABC-CLIO. ISBN 978-0-87436-928-1.
- Churchill, Steven E.; Franciscus, Robert G.; McKean-Peraza, Hilary A.; Daniel, Julie A.; Warren, Brittany R. (August 2009). "Shanidar 3 Neandertal rib puncture wound and paleolithic weaponry". Journal of Human Evolution. 57 (2): 163–178. Bibcode:2009JHumE..57..163C. doi:10.1016/j.jhevol.2009.05.010. PMID 19615713.
- Conley, Bridget; de Waal, Alex (2023). "Genocide, Starvation and Famine". In Kiernan, Ben; Lemos, Tracy Maria; Taylor, Tristan S. (eds.). The Cambridge World History of Genocide. Vol. I: Genocide in the Ancient, Medieval and Premodern Worlds. Cambridge University Press. pp. 127–149. doi:10.1017/9781108655989.007. ISBN 978-1-108-49353-6.
- Conversi, Daniele (2010). "Cultural Homogenization, Ethnic Cleansing, and Genocide". International Studies. Oxford University Press. doi:10.1093/acrefore/9780190846626.013.139. ISBN 978-0-19-084662-6.
- Courtieu, Gilles (2019). "Asia 88 BC: A Landmark in Genocide History". Anatolica. XLV: 29–41. doi:10.2143/ANA.45.0.3287000.
- Cowles, C. S.; Gard, Daniel L.; Merrill, Eugene H.; Longman III, Tremper; Gundry, Stanley N. (2003). Show Them No Mercy: Four Views of God and Canaanite Genocide. Michigan: Zondervan.
- Davies, William David; Finkelstein, Louis (1984). The Cambridge History of Judaism: The late Roman-Rabbinic period. Cambridge University Press. ISBN 978-0-521-77248-8.
- Dawkins, Richard (2007). The God Delusion. London: Black Swan.
- Diamond, Jared (2012). "A Longer Chapter, About Many Wars". The World until Yesterday. Viking Press.
- Durant, Will (1953). The Renaissance. Simon & Schuster. ISBN 0-671-61600-5.
- Earl, Douglas (2011). The Joshua Delusion?: Rethinking Genocide in the Bible. Pasadena, CA: Cascade Books.
- Eck, Werner (1999). "The Bar Kokhba Revolt: The Roman Point of View". Journal of Roman Studies. 89: 87–88. doi:10.2307/300735. JSTOR 300735.
- Eski, Yarin (2023). "Born of violence: the Neanderthal extinction, genocide and colonization". A Criminology of the Human Species. London: Palgrave Macmillan.
- Falk, Avner (2010). Franks and Saracens: Reality and Fantasy in the Crusades. London: Karnac Books, Ltd. ISBN 978-1-85575-733-2.
- Fang, Xuanling (648). "7". Jin Shu 晉書 [Book of Jin] (in Chinese). Vol. 177.
- Fein, Helen (1993). Genocide: A Sociological Perspective. London: Sage Publications.
- Fu, Q.; Li, H.; Moorjani, P.; Jay, F.; Slepchenko, S. M.; Bondarev, A. A.; Johnson, P. L.; Aximu-Petri, A.; Prüfer, K.; De Filippo, C; Meyer, M.; Zwyns, N; Salazar-García, D. C.; Kuzmin, Y. V.; Keates, S. G.; Kosintsev, P. A.; Razhev, D. I.; Richards, M. P.; Peristov, N. V.; Lachmann, M; Douka, K; Higham, T. F.; Slatkin, M; Hublin, J. J.; Reich, D.; Kelso, J.; Viola, T. B.; Pääbo, S. (23 October 2014). "Genome sequence of a 45,000-year-old modern human from western Siberia". Nature. 514 (7523): 445–449. Bibcode:2014Natur.514..445F. doi:10.1038/nature13810. hdl:10550/42071. PMC 4753769. PMID 25341783.
- Gambash, Gil (2023). "Genocidal Perspectives in the Roman Empire's Approach towards the Jews". In Kiernan, Ben; Lemos, Tracy Maria; Taylor, Tristan S. (eds.). The Cambridge World History of Genocide. Vol. I: Genocide in the Ancient, Medieval and Premodern Worlds. Cambridge University Press. pp. 330–352. doi:10.1017/9781108655989.015. ISBN 978-1-108-49353-6.
- Gangopadhyay, Partha (2016). "Economic Foundations of Religious Killings and Genocide with Special Reference to Pakistan, 1978–2012". In Anderton, Charles H.; Brauer, Jurgen (eds.). Economic Aspects of Genocides, Other Mass Atrocities, and Their Prevention. Oxford University Press. pp. 510–535. ISBN 978-0-19-937829-6.
- Gellately, Robert; Kiernan, Ben (2003). The Specter of Genocide: Mass Murder in Historical Perspective. Cambridge: Cambridge University Press. ISBN 978-0-521-52750-7.
- Gerlach, Christian (2010). Extremely Violent Societies: Mass Violence in the Twentieth-Century World. Cambridge University Press. ISBN 978-1-139-49351-2 – via Google Books.
- Goodblatt, David [in Hebrew] (2006). "The political and social history of the Jewish community in the Land of Israel". In Davies, William David; Finkelstein, Louis; Katz, Steven T. (eds.). The Cambridge History of Judaism. Vol. 4, The Late Roman-Rabbinic Period. Cambridge University Press. pp. 404–430.
- Heinrichs, Johannes [in German] (2008). "Die Eburonen, Oder: Die Kunst Des Überlebens" [The Eburones, or: The Art of Survival]. Zeitschrift für Papyrologie und Epigraphik (in German). 164: 203–230. ISSN 0084-5388. JSTOR 20476452.
- Hind, John G. F. (1992). "Mithridates". In Crook, John; et al. (eds.). The last age of the Roman Republic, 146–43 BC. The Cambridge Ancient History. Vol. 9 (2nd ed.). Cambridge University Press. pp. 129–164. ISBN 0-521-85073-8. OCLC 121060.
- Hui, Victoria Tin-Bor (2023). "Genocide, Extermination and Mass Killing in Chinese History". In Kiernan, Ben; Lemos, Tracy Maria; Taylor, Tristan S. (eds.). The Cambridge World History of Genocide. Vol. I: Genocide in the Ancient, Medieval and Premodern Worlds. Cambridge University Press. pp. 376–399. doi:10.1017/9781108655989.017. ISBN 978-1-108-49353-6.
- Hollander, Paul (1 July 2012). "Perspectives on Norman Naimark's Stalin's Genocides". Journal of Cold War Studies. 14 (3): 149–189. doi:10.1162/JCWS_a_00250. S2CID 57560838.
- Irish, Maya Soifer (2023). "Genocidal Massacres of Jews in Medieval Western Europe, 1096–1392". In Kiernan, Ben; Lemos, Tracy Maria; Taylor, Tristan S. (eds.). The Cambridge World History of Genocide. Vol. I: Genocide in the Ancient, Medieval and Premodern Worlds. Cambridge University Press. pp. 425–447. doi:10.1017/9781108655989.019. ISBN 978-1-108-49353-6.
- Jackson, Peter (2003). The Delhi Sultanate: A Political and Military History. Cambridge University Press. ISBN 978-0-521-54329-3.
- Jacobs, Steven Leonard (2023). "The Religion–Genocide Nexus". In Kiernan, Ben; Lemos, Tracy Maria; Taylor, Tristan S. (eds.). The Cambridge World History of Genocide. Vol. I: Genocide in the Ancient, Medieval and Premodern Worlds. Cambridge University Press. pp. 86–102. doi:10.1017/9781108655989.005. ISBN 978-1-108-49353-6.
- Jonassohn, Kurt; Björnson, Karin Solveig (1998). Genocide and Gross Human Rights Violations: In Comparative Perspective. Piscataway, New Jersey: Transaction Publishers. ISBN 978-1-4128-2445-3.
- Jones, Adam (2000). "Gendercide and genocide". Journal of Genocide Research. 2 (2): 185–211. doi:10.1080/713677599.
- ——— (2006). Genocide: A Comprehensive Introduction. Routledge. ISBN 978-0-415-35385-4. Excerpts Chapter 1: Genocide in prehistory, antiquity, and early modernity Archived 10 October 2017 at the Wayback Machine
- ——— (2010). Genocide: A Comprehensive Introduction. Routledge. ISBN 978-1-136-93797-2.
- Jones, Adam; Lower, Wendy (2023). "Genocide and Gender: Dynamics and Consequences". In Kiernan, Ben; Lemos, Tracy Maria; Taylor, Tristan S. (eds.). The Cambridge World History of Genocide. Vol. I: Genocide in the Ancient, Medieval and Premodern Worlds. Cambridge University Press. pp. 103–126. doi:10.1017/9781108655989.006. ISBN 978-1-108-49353-6.
- Jones, Dan (2007). "The Neanderthal within". New Scientist. 193 (2593): 28–32. doi:10.1016/s0262-4079(07)60550-8.
- Kahn, Paul (1998). The Secret History of the Mongols: The Origin of Chinghis Khan. Cheng & Tsui. ISBN 978-0-88727-299-8.
- Kakar, Mohammed Hassan (1995). Afghanistan: The Soviet Invasion and the Afghan Response, 1979–1982. University of California Press. ISBN 978-0-5209-1914-3 – via Google Books.
- Kant, Immanuel (1795). Perpetual Peace. – available here
- Kapelle, William E. (1979). The Norman Conquest of the North: The Region and its Transformation 1000–1135. Raleigh-Durham, NC: University of North Carolina Press. ISBN 0-8078-1371-0.
- Keeley, Lawrence (1996). War Before Civilization: the Myth of the Peaceful Savage. New York: Oxford University Press.
- Keppie, L. J. F. (2000). Legions and veterans: Roman army papers 1971–2000. Franz Steiner Verlag. ISBN 3-515-07744-8.
- Kiernan, Ben (2004). "The First Genocide: Carthage, 146 BC". Diogenes. 51 (3): 27–39. doi:10.1177/0392192104043648.
- ——— (2007). Blood and Soil: A World History of Genocide and Extermination from Sparta to Darfur. New Haven, CT: Yale University Press. ISBN 978-0-300-10098-3.
- Ko, Kwang Hyun (2016). "Hominin interbreeding and the evolution of human variation". Journal of Biological Research-Thessaloniki. 23 17. doi:10.1186/s40709-016-0054-7. PMC 4947341. PMID 27429943.
- Kurin, Danielle (2023). "Mass Extermination in Prehistoric Andean South America". In Kiernan, Ben; Lemos, Tracy Maria; Taylor, Tristan S. (eds.). The Cambridge World History of Genocide. Vol. I: Genocide in the Ancient, Medieval and Premodern Worlds. Cambridge University Press. pp. 572–593. doi:10.1017/9781108655989.025. ISBN 978-1-108-49353-6.
- Lang, Berel (2005). "The Evil in Genocide". Genocide and Human Rights: A Philosophical Guide. Palgrave Macmillan UK. pp. 5–17. doi:10.1057/9780230554832_1. ISBN 978-0-230-55483-2.
- Lemkin, Raphael (2012). Jacobs, Steven Leonard (ed.). Lemkin on Genocide. Lanham, Maryland: Rowman & Littlefield. ISBN 978-0-7391-4526-5.
- Lendering, Jona (2002). "Legio XXII Deiotariana". Ancient Warfare Magazine. Archived from the original on 17 March 2015 – via livius.org.
- Lerner, Robert E. (2010). "A Most Holy War: The Albigensian Crusade and the Battle for Christendom (review)". Common Knowledge. 16 (2): 292. doi:10.1215/0961754X-2009-101. S2CID 144965606.
- Lewin, Ariel (2005). The archaeology of Ancient Judea and Palestine. Getty Publications. ISBN 0-89236-800-4.
- Lewis, C. P. (2023). "William the Conqueror's Harrying of the North, 1069–1070: What, If Not Genocide?". In Kiernan, Ben; Lemos, Tracy Maria; Taylor, Tristan S. (eds.). The Cambridge World History of Genocide. Vol. I: Genocide in the Ancient, Medieval and Premodern Worlds. Cambridge University Press. pp. 403–424. doi:10.1017/9781108655989.018. ISBN 978-1-108-49353-6.
- Lock, Peter (2006). The Routledge Companion to the Crusades. New York: Routledge. ISBN 0-415-24732-2.
- Malthus, Thomas (1963). An Essay on the Principle of Population. Illinois: Homewood.
- Man, John (2007). Genghis Khan: Life, Death, and Resurrection. Macmillan. ISBN 978-0-312-36624-7.
- Marvin, Laurence W. (2009). "A Most Holy War: The Albigensian Crusade and the Battle for Christendom (review)". The Catholic Historical Review. 95 (4): 801–802. doi:10.1353/cat.0.0546. S2CID 159618901.
- Masters, Catherine (8 September 2007). "'Battle rage' fed Maori cannibalism". The New Zealand Herald. Archived from the original on 13 January 2024.
- May, Timothy (2023). "Mongol Genocides of the Thirteenth Century". In Kiernan, Ben; Lemos, Tracy Maria; Taylor, Tristan S. (eds.). The Cambridge World History of Genocide. Vol. I: Genocide in the Ancient, Medieval and Premodern Worlds. Cambridge University Press. pp. 498–522. doi:10.1017/9781108655989.022. ISBN 978-1-108-49353-6.
- Mor, Menahem (2016). The Second Jewish Revolt: The Bar Kokhba War, 132–136 CE. The Brill Reference Library of Judaism. Brill. ISBN 978-90-04-31463-4.
- Moses, A. Dirk, ed. (2008). Empire, Colony, Genocide: Conquest, Occupation, and Subaltern Resistance in World History. Oxford: Berghahn Books. ISBN 978-1-84545-452-4.
- "Twentieth Century Atlas – Historical Body Count". necrometrics.com. January 2012. Archived from the original on 4 October 2020.
- Oliver, Douglas Llewellyn (1989). The Native Cultures of the Pacific Islands. Honolulu: University of Hawaii Press.
- Ostrovsky, Max (2006). The Hyperbola of the World Order. Lanham: University Press of America.
- Pegg, Mark Gregory (2008). A Most Holy War: The Albigensian Crusade and the Battle for Christendom. Oxford, UK: Oxford University Press. ISBN 978-0-19-988371-4.
- ——— (2023). "The Albigensian Crusade and the Early Inquisitions into Heretical Depravity, 1208–1246". In Kiernan, Ben; Lemos, Tracy Maria; Taylor, Tristan S. (eds.). The Cambridge World History of Genocide. Vol. I: Genocide in the Ancient, Medieval and Premodern Worlds. Cambridge University Press. pp. 470–497. doi:10.1017/9781108655989.021. ISBN 978-1-108-49353-6.
- Pinker, Steven (2002). The Blank Slate. New York: Penguin Books.
- Potter, James M.; Chuipka, Jason P. (2010). "Perimortem mutilation of human remains in an early village in the American Southwest: A case for ethnic violence" (PDF). Journal of Anthropological Archaeology. 29 (4): 507–523. doi:10.1016/j.jaa.2010.08.001.
- Quesada-Sanz, Fernando (2015). "Genocide and mass-murder in Second Iron Age Europe: Methodological issues and case studies in the Iberian Peninsula". In Carmichael, Cathie; Maguire, Richard C. (eds.). The Routledge History of Genocide. Routledge. pp. 9–22. ISBN 978-0-367-86706-5.
- Raaflaub, Kurt (2021). "Caesar and Genocide: Confronting the Dark Side of Caesar's Gallic Wars". New England Classical Journal. 48 (1). Classical Association of New England: 54–80. doi:10.52284/NECJ/48.1/article/raaflaub. S2CID 236550544.
- Rex, Peter (2004). The English Resistance: The Underground War Against the Normans. Stroud, Gloucestershire: Tempus. ISBN 0-7524-2827-6.
- Ríos, L.; Kivell, R. L.; Lalueza-Fox, C.; et al. (8 February 2019). "Skeletal Anomalies in The Neandertal Family of El Sidrón (Spain) Support A Role of Inbreeding in Neandertal Extinction". Scientific Reports. 9 (1): 1697. Bibcode:2019NatSR...9.1697R. doi:10.1038/s41598-019-38571-1. PMC 6368597. PMID 30737446.
- Roymans, Nico (2004). Ethnic Identity and Imperial Power: The Batavians in the Early Roman Empire. Amsterdam University Press. ISBN 978-90-5356-705-0.
- Rubinstein, W. D. (2004). Genocide: A History. Pearson Education. ISBN 978-0-582-50601-5.
- Rubinstein, W. D. (2004). "Genocide and Historical Debate: William D. Rubinstein Ascribes the Bitterness of Historians' Arguments to the Lack of an Agreed Definition and to Political Agendas". History Today. 54. Archived from the original on 5 February 2009 – via Questia.
- Rugira, Lonzen (20 April 2022). "Why Genocide is "the crime of crimes"". Pan African Review. Archived from the original on 13 June 2024.
- Saksena, Banarsi Prasad (1992) [1970]. "The Khaljis: Alauddin Khalji". In Habib, Mohammad; Nizami, Khaliq Ahmad (eds.). A Comprehensive History of India: The Delhi Sultanat (A.D. 1206–1526). Vol. 5 (Second ed.). The Indian History Congress / People's Publishing House. OCLC 31870180.
- Sánchez-Quinto, F.; Botigué, L. R.; Civit, S.; Arenas, C.; Avila-Arcos, M. C.; Bustamante, C. D.; Comas, D.; Lalueza-Fox, C. (17 October 2012). "North African Populations Carry the Signature of Admixture with Neandertals". PLOS ONE. 7 (10) e47765. Bibcode:2012PLoSO...747765S. doi:10.1371/journal.pone.0047765. PMC 3474783. PMID 23082212.
- Schabas, William A. (2000). Genocide in International Law: The Crimes of Crimes (PDF) (1st ed.). Cambridge University Press. ISBN 0-521-78262-7. Archived from the original (PDF) on 16 June 2024.
- Schabas, William A. (2009). Genocide in International Law: The Crime of Crimes (2nd ed.). Cambridge: Cambridge University Press. ISBN 978-0-521-71900-1.
- Schäfer, Peter (2003). The Bar Kokhba War Reconsidered. Mohr Siebeck. ISBN 3-16-148076-7.
- Staub, Ervin (1989). The Roots of Evil: The Origins of Genocide and Other Group Violence. Cambridge, UK: Cambridge University Press. ISBN 978-0-521-42214-7.
- Straus, Scott (2022). Graziosi, Andrea; Sysyn, Frank E. (eds.). Genocide: The Power and Problems of a Concept. McGill-Queen's University Press. ISBN 978-0-2280-0951-1.
- Strayer, Joseph R. (1971). The Albigensian Crusades. New York: The Dial Press. ISBN 0-472-09476-9.
- Stubbersfield, Edgar (2022). Ephesus: The Nursery of Christianity. Eugene, Oregon: Wipf and Stock Publishers. ISBN 978-1-6667-4134-6. OCLC 1387010102.
- Sullivan, Alexis P.; Manuel, Marc de; Marques-Bonet, Tomas; Perry, George H. (July 2017). "An evolutionary medicine perspective on Neandertal extinction". Journal of Human Evolution. 108: 62–71. Bibcode:2017JHumE.108...62S. doi:10.1016/j.jhevol.2017.03.004. PMID 28622932.
- Taylor, J. E. (2012). The Essenes, the Scrolls, and the Dead Sea. Oxford University Press. ISBN 978-0-19-955448-5.
- Taylor, Tristan S. (2023). "A Tale of Three Cities: The Roman Destruction of Carthage, Corinth and Numantia". In Kiernan, Ben; Lemos, Tracy Maria; Taylor, Tristan S. (eds.). The Cambridge World History of Genocide. Vol. I: Genocide in the Ancient, Medieval and Premodern Worlds. Cambridge University Press. pp. 278–308. doi:10.1017/9781108655989.013. ISBN 978-1-108-49353-6.
- ——— (2023). "Caesar's Gallic Genocide: A Case Study in Ancient Mass Violence". In Kiernan, Ben; Lemos, Tracy Maria; Taylor, Tristan S. (eds.). The Cambridge World History of Genocide. Vol. I: Genocide in the Ancient, Medieval and Premodern Worlds. Cambridge University Press. pp. 309–329. doi:10.1017/9781108655989.014. ISBN 978-1-108-49353-6.
- Timmermann, Axel (June 2020). "Quantifying the potential causes of Neanderthal extinction: Abrupt climate change versus competition and interbreeding". Quaternary Science Reviews. 238 106331. Bibcode:2020QSRv..23806331T. doi:10.1016/j.quascirev.2020.106331.
- Tostado, Igor Pérez (2023). "The Spanish Destruction of the Canary Islands: A Template for the Caribbean Genocide". In Kiernan, Ben; Lemos, Tracy Maria; Taylor, Tristan S. (eds.). The Cambridge World History of Genocide. Vol. I: Genocide in the Ancient, Medieval and Premodern Worlds. Cambridge University Press. pp. 594–621. doi:10.1017/9781108655989.026. ISBN 978-1-108-49353-6.
- Totten, Samuel (2004). Teaching About Genocide: Issues, Approaches, and Resources. Information Age Publishing. ISBN 978-1-59311-075-8.
- Towner, Emil B. (2011). "Quantifying Genocide: What Are We Really Counting (On)?". JAC. 31 (3/4): 625–638. ISSN 2162-5190. JSTOR 41709663.
- Trimm, Charlie (2022). The Destruction of the Canaanites: God, Genocide and Biblical Interpretation. Michigan: Eerdmans.
- Turney-High, Harry (1971). The Primitive War. University of South Carolina Press.
- "Lemkin, Raphael". UNHCR. 2001. Archived from the original on 29 November 2014.
- Vaesen, Krist (27 November 2019). "Inbreeding, Allee effects and stochasticity might be sufficient to account for Neanderthal extinction". PLOS ONE. 14 (11) e0225117. Bibcode:2019PLoSO..1425117V. doi:10.1371/journal.pone.0225117. PMC 6880983. PMID 31774843.
- Vankilde, Helle (2023). "Genocide before the State?". In Kiernan, Ben; Lemos, Tracy Maria; Taylor, Tristan S. (eds.). The Cambridge World History of Genocide. Vol. I: Genocide in the Ancient, Medieval and Premodern Worlds. Cambridge University Press. pp. 59–85. doi:10.1017/9781108655989.004. ISBN 978-1-108-49353-6.
- Viegas, Jennifer (20 September 2010). "How genocide wiped out a Native American population". NBC News. Archived from the original on 1 November 2023.
- Weiss-Wendt, Anton (December 2005). "Hostage of Politics: Raphael Lemkin on 'Soviet Genocide'". Journal of Genocide Research. 7 (4). Routledge: 551–559. doi:10.1080/14623520500350017. ISSN 1462-3528. S2CID 144612446.
- Zissu, Boaz [in Hebrew]; Ganor, Amir (2002). "chorevet atari - kfar yahodi mitkupat havit hashani beshpalet yehuda" חורבת עתרי - כפר יהודי מתקופת הבית השני בשפלת יהודה [Horvat Ethri – a Jewish village from the Second Temple period in the Judean Lowlands] (PDF). קדמוניות [Information from the Society for the Exploration of the Land of Israel and its Antiquities]. 1 (123). Archived from the original (PDF) on 8 October 2013.
