= Clea =

Clea is a female given name.

Clea may refer to:

== People with the given name ==
- Clea DuVall (born 1977), actress
- Clea Hoyte (born 1981), West Indies cricketer
- Clea Koff (born 1972), British-born American forensic anthropologist and author
- Clea Lewis (born 1965), American actress
- Clea Simon (born 1961), American writer

== Fictional characters and mythology ==
- Clea Dessendre, a Clair Obscur: Expedition 33 character
- Clea Strange, a Marvel Comics character and ally of Doctor Strange
- Queen Clea, a DC Comics villainess and an enemy of Wonder Woman
- Clea, a Delphic oracle

== Entertainment ==
- Clea (group), a British pop group
- Clea (novel), a novel by Lawrence Durrell

== Biology and geography ==
- Clea (gastropod), a freshwater gastropod from family Buccinidae
- Clea Lake
- Cross-linked enzyme aggregate or CLEA, an immobilized enzyme

== See also ==
- Sir Henry Fletcher, 1st Baronet, of Clea Hall
- Cleo (disambiguation)
