= Cleo (name) =

Cleo is a given name, derived from the name Clio in Greek mythology.

As a spelling variant of Clio, the name is etymologically derived from the Greek root κλέω/κλείω, Latinised as kleos (meaning "to recount", "to make famous", "to celebrate", "glory", "to praise" or "to acclaim"). Clio was the muse of history, who was responsible for providing inspiration to historians and poets. The name has been embraced by many cultures where Greek influence was felt, including Cleopatra, the powerful queen of ancient Egypt, whose name was derived from Cleo. In Western societies in more recent times, Cleo has evolved as a variant or short form of Cleopatra and used as a given name.

It was commonly used for boys as well as girls in the early twentieth century, after being made popular by the feature film Cleopatra (1917), starring Theda Bara.

== People ==
=== Single name ===
- Cleo (mathematician), pseudonym of Vladimir Reshetnikov, Uzbekistani software developer who anonymously solved complex mathematics problems
- Cléo (born 1985), nickname of professional football player Cléverson Gabriel Córdova
- Cléo (French singer) (born 1946), stage name of French 1960s singer Chantal Rousselot
- Cleo (Swedish singer) (born 1987), Swedish rap artist, singer and songwriter
- Cleo (Polish singer) (born 1983), stage name of Polish singer-songwriter Joanna Klepko
- Cleo. (born 1988), UK singer-songwriter, formerly known as MzBratt
- DJ Cleo (born 1979), South African record producer
- Miss Cleo (1962–2016), pseudonym for Youree Dell Harris, American self-proclaimed psychic

=== Given name ===
- Cleo von Adelsheim (born 1987), German-Chilean actress
- Cleo Brown (1909–1995), American blues and jazz vocalist and pianist
- Cleo S. Cason (1910–2003), American librarian
- Cleo Damianakes (1895–1979), American etcher, painter, and illustrator
- Cleo Demetriou (born 2001), child actress
- Cleo Fields (born 1962), American lawyer and politician, member of the United States House of Representatives from Louisiana
- Cléo Hickmann (born 1959), Brazilian footballer
- Cleo Higgins (born 1982), of the vocal group Cleopatra
- Cleo Laine (1927-2025), jazz singer and actress
- Cleo Lemon (born 1979), Canadian football quarterback
- Cleo Madison (1883–1964), American stage and silent film actress born Lulu Baile
- Cléo Mélières (born 2007), French footballer
- Cléo de Mérode (1875–1966), French dancer
- Cleo Miller (born 1951), American former football player
- Cleo Moore (1924–1973), American actress
- Cléo Muratore de Souza (1937–1998), Brazilian footballer
- Cleo A. Noel Jr. (1918–1973), American ambassador to Sudan killed by Black September terrorists
- Cleo A. O'Donnell (1883–1953), American football player and coach
- Cleo Francis Pineau (1893–1972), American World War I flying ace and businessman
- Cléo Pires (born 1982), actress
- Cleo Ridgely (1893–1962), American film actress
- Cleo Rocos (born 1962), British comedian
- Cleo Smith (baseball) (born 1900), American baseball player
- Cleo Smith, Australian girl who was abducted and then found; see Disappearance of Cleo Smith
- Cleo Sylvestre (1945–2024), English actress
- Cleo Watson, British political adviser

== Fictional characters ==
- Cleo, an anthropomorphic goldfish who first appeared in Disney's Pinocchio (1940)
- Cleo, a basset hound who appeared in the American television series The People’s Choice
- Cleo, the main protagonist in Pirates: Adventures in Art
- Cleo, from Invisible Sister
- Cléo, the titular protagonist of the French film Cléo from 5 to 7
- Cleo, a dancer from The Next Step
- Cleo, from the mobile game Dragalia Lost
- Cleo, a purple poodle from the TV show Clifford the Big Red Dog
- Cleo Babbitt, in the CBS soap opera As the World Turns
- Cleo Bellows, a main character in the OPB TV show MythQuest
- Cleo Finch, in the NBC television drama ER
- Cleo Graves, a main character in Super Monsters
- Cleo Lion, a character from the children's television series Between the Lions
- Cleo Sertori, one of the three main protagonists of the Australian fantasy children and teen drama television series H2O: Just Add Water
- Cleo Telerin, one of the two main protagonists of Cleo and Cuquin
- Cleo Carter, one of the three main characters from Tutenstein
- Cleo De Nile, one of the monster girls, daughter of The Mummy and princess of Egypt, from the popular teen show Monster High
- Cleo Anderson, a character from the Netflix teen drama Outer Banks

== See also ==
- Cleo (disambiguation)
- Cleopatra (name)
- Clio
