= Klio =

Klio may refer to:

== Places ==
- 84 Klio, an asteroid
- Klio, Greece, a village in the northeastern part of Lesbos Island

== Broadcast stations ==
- KLIO (KLIO-AM), former designation of KFKB (1070 AM) from 2010 to 2014, a radio station licensed to serve Wichita, Kansas, United States
- KLIO-FM, initial designation of KLZT, a radio station licensed to Bastrop, Texas
- KLIO-FM, former designation of KMXG, a radio station licensed to Clinton, Iowa

== Other uses ==
- An alternative spelling of Clio, the mythical Muse of history
- SS Klio, two ships of Neptun Line, Germany
- Klio (journal), a journal of ancient history published in Germany

== See also ==
- Cleo (disambiguation)
- Clio (disambiguation)
- Kleo (disambiguation)
- Kilo (disambiguation)
