= Kleo (disambiguation) =

Kleo is a German action-thriller comedy television series.

Kleo may also refer to:

- KLEO, radio station in Kahalu'u, Hawaii
- Kleo Bare Metal Backup, backup software
- Kleo Pleyer (1898–1942), German politician
- Kleo the Misfit Unicorn, 1997 Canadian TV series or program

== See also ==
- Cleo (disambiguation)
- Clio (disambiguation)
- Klio (disambiguation)
