= Siege of Melos =

416 BC event of the Peloponnesian War

Coordinates: 36°41′N 24°25′E

Melos (purple), the Delian League (orange), and the Peloponnesian League (green)

The siege of Melos occurred in 416 BC, during the Peloponnesian War between Athens and Sparta, when the Athenians attacked Melos, an island in the Aegean Sea roughly 110 kilometres (68 miles) east of mainland Greece. Though the Melians had ancestral ties to Sparta, they were neutral in the war. Athens invaded Melos in the summer of 416 BC and demanded that the Melians surrender and pay tribute to Athens or face annihilation. The Melians refused, so the Athenians laid siege to their city. Melos surrendered in the winter, and the Athenians executed the men of Melos and enslaved the women and children.

This siege is best remembered for the Melian Dialogue, a dramatization of the negotiations between the Athenians and the Melians before the siege, written by the classical Athenian historian Thucydides. In the negotiations, the Athenians offer no moral justification for their invasion, but instead bluntly tell the Melians that Athens needs Melos for its own ends and that the only thing Melians stand to gain in submitting without a fight was self-preservation.

The Melian Dialogue is taught as an advocation of imperialism at the expense of other states, and that the only rational approach is based on power and advantage. In particular, the quotation "the strong do what they can and the weak suffer what they must" is taken as an appeal to political power as opposed to justice.

== Background ==
The Peloponnesian War lasted from 431 to 404 BC. The war was fought between the Peloponnesian League, which was an alliance of Greek cities led by Sparta, and the Delian League, which was an alliance led by Athens. Athens had the superior navy and controlled nearly all the islands in the Aegean Sea. Melos was the only significant island in the Aegean Sea that Athens did not control. The people of Melos were Dorians, the same ethnic group as the Spartans, but they were independent of the Spartan empire; the Athenians were Ionians. In general, the Melians sought to remain neutral in the war, although there is archaeological evidence that sometime between 428 and 425 BC, some Melians donated at least twenty minas of silver (about 12.5 kg) to the Spartan war effort.

In 426 BC, Athens sent an army of 2,000 men to raid the Melian countryside, but the Melians would not be bullied into submission. In 425 or 424 BC, Athens demanded of Melos a tribute of fifteen talents of silver (roughly 390 kg). This sum could have paid the wages of a trireme crew for 15 months, or bought 540 metric tons of wheat, enough to feed 2,160 men for a year. Given the relative size of Melos, this suggests that it was a prosperous island. Melos refused to pay, but Athens initially did nothing about this, because its forces were fully engaged in fighting Sparta.

== Siege ==
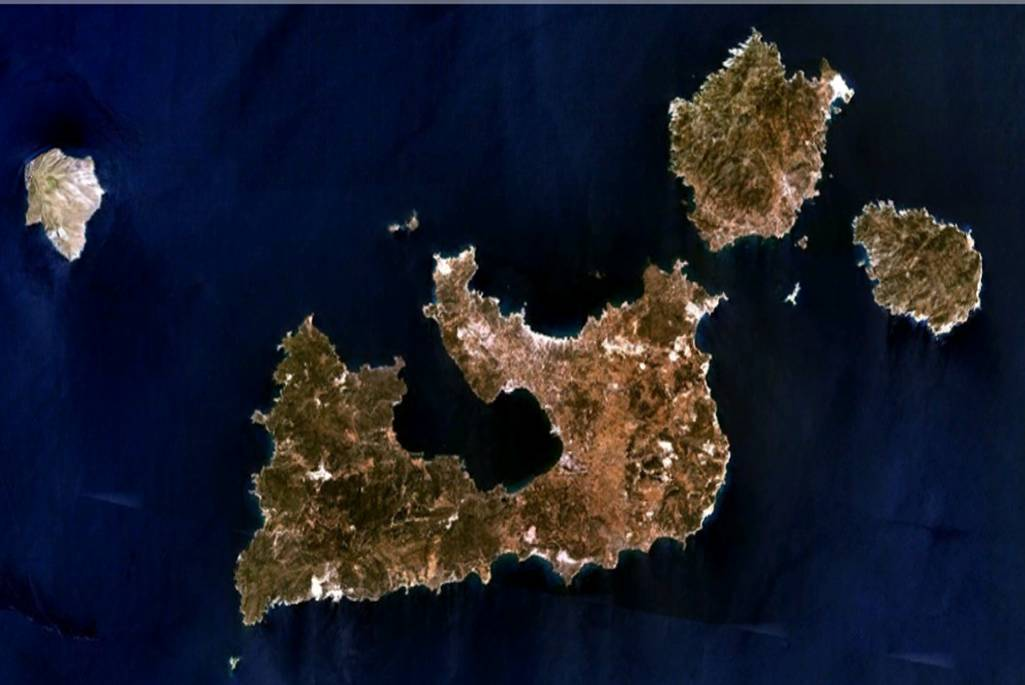
Melos, and the approximate location of the ancient city.

After the Spartan victory in the Battle of Mantinea (418 BC), a temporary truce was agreed between Athens and Sparta. This freed up military forces for use against states which had been neutral in the war. The Athenian democracy began to discuss how best to use its fleet and troops until the expected resumption of hostilities against Sparta. After much debate, the Athenian assembly voted to punish Melos for its earlier defiance and refusal to join the Delian League.

In the summer of 416 BC, Athens sent an army of at least 3,400 men to conquer Melos: 1,600 heavy infantry, 300 archers, and 20 mounted archers all from Athens, plus 1,500 heavy infantry from other Delian League cities. The fleet that transported this army had 38 ships: 30 from Athens, 6 from Chios, and 2 from Lesbos. This expedition was led by the generals Cleomedes and Tisias. After setting up camp on the island, the Athenians sent emissaries to negotiate with the rulers of Melos. The emissaries demanded that Melos join the Delian League and pay tribute to Athens or face destruction. The Melians rejected this ultimatum.

The Athenians laid siege to the city of Melos but found its defences too strong to capture by force. They invested the city, cutting it off from supplies, intending to starve the Melians into submission. The Athenians kept enough troops on the island to maintain the blockade, but withdrew most of their force to fight elsewhere. The Melians made several sorties, at one point capturing part of the Athenian line, but were unable to break the siege. In response, Athens sent reinforcements under the command of Philocrates. The Athenians also had help from collaborators within Melos. Melos surrendered in the following winter (416–415 BC).

== Aftermath ==
The Athenians executed the men of fighting age and sold the women and children into slavery. They then settled 500 of their own colonists on the island.

In 405 BC, by which time Athens was losing the war, the Spartan general Lysander expelled the Athenian colonists from Melos and restored the survivors of the siege to the island. The once-independent Melos became a Spartan territory, which would mean that it had a Spartan garrison and a military governor (a harmost).

== Melian Dialogue ==
In History of the Peloponnesian War (Book 5, Chapters 84–116), the contemporary Athenian historian Thucydides included a dramatization of the negotiations between the Athenian emissaries and the rulers of Melos. Thucydides did not witness the negotiations and in fact had been in exile at the time, so this dialogue paraphrases what he believed was discussed.

=== Synopsis ===
The Athenians offer the Melians an ultimatum: surrender and pay tribute to Athens, or be destroyed. The Athenians do not wish to waste time arguing over the morality of the situation, because in practice might makes right—or, in their own words: "the strong do what they can and the weak suffer what they must."

The Melians argue that they are a neutral city and not an enemy, so Athens has no need to conquer them. The Athenians counter that if they accept Melos' neutrality and independence, they would look weak; their subjects would think that they left Melos alone because they were not strong enough to conquer it.

The Melians argue that an invasion will alarm the other neutral Greek states, who will become hostile to Athens for fear of being invaded themselves. The Athenians counter that the other Greek states on the mainland are unlikely to act this way, because they are free and independent and thus loath to take up arms against Athens. What worries Athens is potential rebellions in its empire from disgruntled peoples they have already conquered, including islands that would threaten its dominance of the seas. Conquering Melos will demonstrate Athens' strength and discourage rebellions.

The Melians argue that it would be shameful and cowardly of them to submit without a fight. The Athenians advise the Melians to swallow their pride because they are not facing a fair fight and defeat will mean annihilation.

The Melians argue that though the Athenians are far stronger, there is still a chance that the Melians could win, and they will regret not trying their luck. The Athenians counter that the Melians should not indulge in hope when their odds of winning are so evidently faint, and the consequences of defeat so terrible. If the Melians resist, they will likely lose and come to bitterly regret their irrational optimism.

The Melians argue that they will have the assistance of the gods because their position is morally just. The Athenians counter that the gods will not intervene because it is the natural order of things for the strong to dominate the weak.

The Melians argue that their Spartan kin will come to their defense. The Athenians counter that the Spartans do not have enough at stake in Melos to risk an intervention, noting that Athens has the stronger navy.

The Athenians express their shock at the Melians' lack of realism. They reiterate that there is no shame in submitting to an overwhelmingly stronger enemy, especially one who is offering reasonable terms. The Melians do not change their minds and politely dismiss the envoys.

== Analysis ==
Thucydides explained that the purpose of conquering Melos was to demonstrate the strength and sternness of Athens so as to discourage its island territories from rebelling. Whether it was effective at discouraging rebellion is uncertain. Just a few years after the conquest of Melos, Athens suffered a devastating defeat in a military expedition to Sicily, after which rebellions happened throughout the empire. Whatever benefit the conquest of Melos produced was wiped away by the disaster that happened in Sicily.

Whether Melos was truly neutral is sometimes debated by scholars. Thucydides wrote that after the raid by Nicias in 426 BC, the Melians assumed "an attitude of open hostility", but neither Thucydides nor any other writer of the era mentioned any specific offence that Melos committed against Athens. There is archaeological evidence that Melos once donated some money to Sparta (roughly 12.5 kg in silver), but it is uncertain whether this donation happened before or after the raid by Nicias. Melos is typically regarded by scholars to have been an innocent victim of Athenian imperialism.

The islands of the Aegean Sea provided valuable tax revenue for Athens, but what was probably more vital was control of their ports. Warships of the era (triremes) could carry little in the way of supplies and had no sleeping space for the crew, and thus needed to stop in port on a daily basis to buy supplies, cook meals, and camp for the night. Triremes were also not particularly seaworthy and thus needed harbors to shelter from rough weather. A trireme could normally travel around 80 kilometres (50 mi) in a day whereas a trip from Athens to Asia Minor is roughly 300 kilometres (190 mi). Thus, in order to control the Aegean, Athens needed to control the islands' ports for its navy. If Melos was neutral, enemy ships could resupply there, so capturing it denied that to Athens' enemies. But this issue is not raised in the Melian Dialogue; in fact the Melians struggle to understand why Athens cannot leave them alone.

The Athenians had shown mercy to their defeated enemies in the earlier years of the Peloponnesian War, and in preceding wars. For instance, after putting down the rebellious city of Potidaea in 429 BC, the Athenians spared the surviving Potidaeans and allowed them to leave the city. As the war dragged on, the Athenians came to feel that leniency made them look weak and encouraged revolts. The rising brutality of the Athenians was also a response to Spartan brutality, which had been extreme from the beginning. In particular, it was after the massacre committed by the Spartans at Plataea in 427 BC that the Athenians habitually massacred their own prisoners.

Even so, the massacre of the Melians shocked the Greek world, even in Athens. The Athenian rhetorician Isocrates, in his apologia for Athens' conquests, mentioned the massacre at Melos as a major point of criticism against Athens, but he argued that it was necessary and that the other warring states were just as brutal. The Athenian historian Xenophon wrote that in 405 BC, with the Spartan army closing in on Athens, the citizens of Athens worried that the Spartans would treat them with the same cruelty that the Athenian army had shown the Melians.

There is circumstantial evidence that suggests that the Melians surrendered only after enduring extreme starvation: the expression "Melian famine" entered the Greek language as a metaphor for extreme starvation. The first known appearance of this phrase is in Aristophanes' play The Birds (414 BC), and its usage seems to have lasted well into the Byzantine era as it is mentioned in the Suda, a 10th-century Byzantine encyclopedia.

In March 415 BC, the Athenian playwright Euripides premiered a play called The Trojan Women, which explores the suffering of the inhabitants of a conquered city. Although Melos is not explicitly mentioned (the setting is the Trojan War), some scholars regard it as a contemporary commentary on the massacre at Melos. Historian Mark Ringer regards this as unlikely, as Euripides was probably developing his play before the siege of Melos even began, with only a month or two after its fall to make revision, and such commentary could have offended Athenian audiences of the production.

It is uncertain whether the fate of Melos was decided by the government of Athens or the Athenian generals on Melos. A historical speech falsely attributed to the Athenian orator Andocides claims that the statesman Alcibiades advocated the enslavement of the Melian survivors before the government of Athens. This account gives no date for the decree, so it could have been written to justify the atrocities after the fact. Thucydides made no mention of any such decree in his own account.

The treatment of the Melians is sometimes considered an example of genocide in the ancient world.

== See also ==
- Mytilenean Debate
