= Clea Lake =

Lake in County Armagh, Northern Ireland

- Location within Northern Ireland
- Location: County Armagh, Northern Ireland
- Coordinates: 54°13′50″N 6°43′15″W
- Type: Fresh Water Lake
- Primary inflows: Gentle Owens
- Primary outflows: Callan
- Basin countries: Northern Ireland
- Settlements: Keady

Clea Lake or Lough Clea is situated just outside Keady in County Armagh, Northern Ireland. It provides water for the Keady area and is a popular fishing location in south Armagh.
