= SS Klio =

Klio was the name of two ships operated by Dampschiffahrts Gesellschaft Neptun AG (Neptun Line).

- SS Klio (1906)
- SS Klio (1924)
