= HMS Clio =

HMS Clio can refer to any of three Royal Navy ships named after the Greek muse of history:

- HMS Clio (1807) was a Cruizer-class brig-sloop launched in 1807 and broken up in 1845.
- HMS Clio (1858) was a wooden screw corvette launched in 1858 and sold in 1920.
- HMS Clio (1903) was a Cadmus-class sloop launched in 1903 and sold in 1920.
