= Clio-Danae Othoneou =

Greek actress and musician (born 1979)

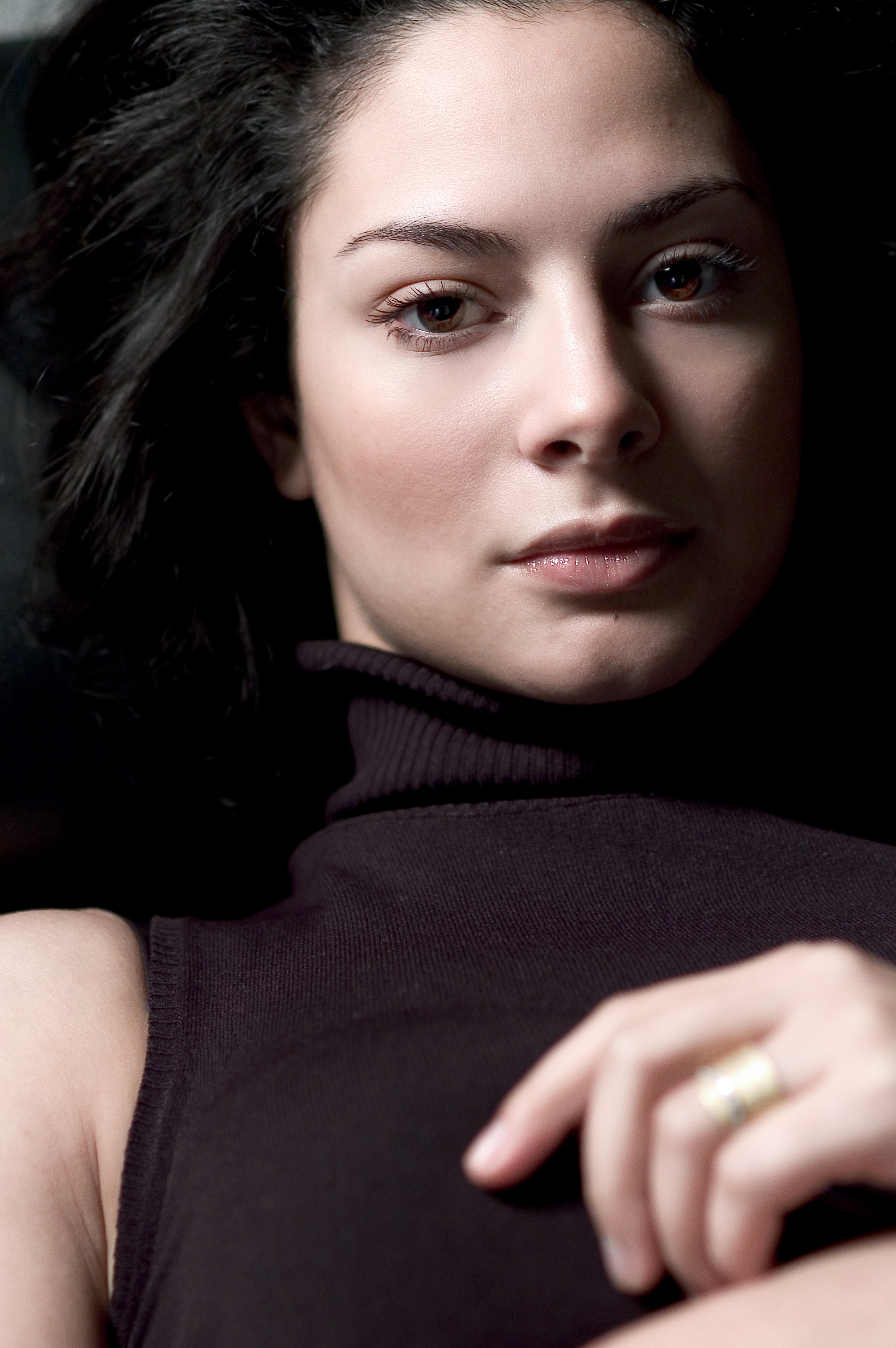
- Born: 30 September 1979 (age 46); Thessaloniki, Greece
- Spouse: Vladimiros Symeonidis (m. 2012)
- Children: Sofia Symeonidou

Clio Danae Othoneou (Greek: Κλειώ Δανάη Οθωναίου born 30 September 1979) is a Greek actress, musician and pianist.

== Family and early life ==
She was born September 30, 1979, in Thessaloniki, Greece, where her parents studied, and is the oldest of three daughters. At age two, they moved to Xanthi, her mother's hometown. There she began the first courses of piano in the National Conservatoire of Xanthi at five and a half. A few years later, she moved to Athens suburb of Cholargos, her father's hometown.

== Music education ==
She continued piano studies in the National Conservatoire, in Athens Conservatoire and the Attica Conservatoire, where she studied with Marina Lamprinoudi, Parry Derempei-Papastavrou and Dionyssis Malloychos. At age seven, she gave her first public performance in "Parnassos Hall" in Athens, playing Claude Debussy. From 1996, she appeared in many piano concerts, in various Greek cities. In 1998, she received her degree in piano and in 2000 a diploma Soloist, studying under Dimitris Toufexis.

== Theatre education ==
She studied for one year in the Superior Dramatic Faculty “ARCHI" of Nelli Karra. The next year she passed through examinations to enroll in the Superior Dramatic Faculty of National Theatre. The same period, she studied lyrical music with soprano Irini Karayianni. In 2005 she graduated from the Superior Dramatic Faculty of National Theatre.

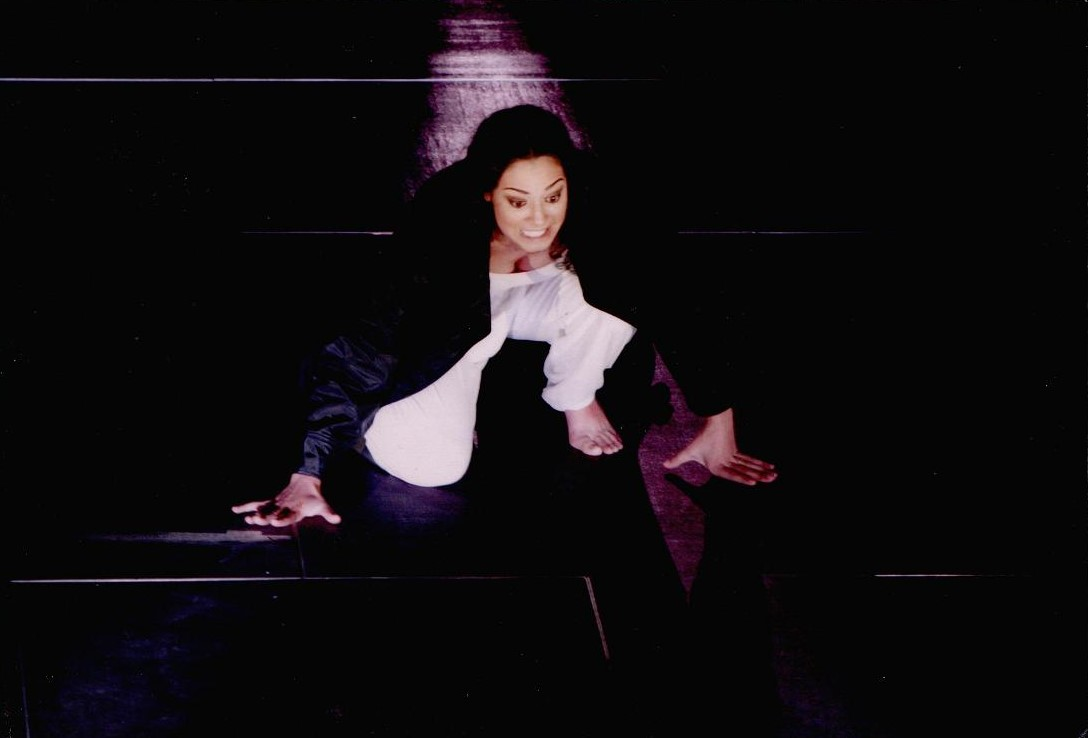
Clio Danae Othoneou as Medea in Epidaurus (Summer 2005)
