= Clio, Iowa =

City in Iowa, United States

- City
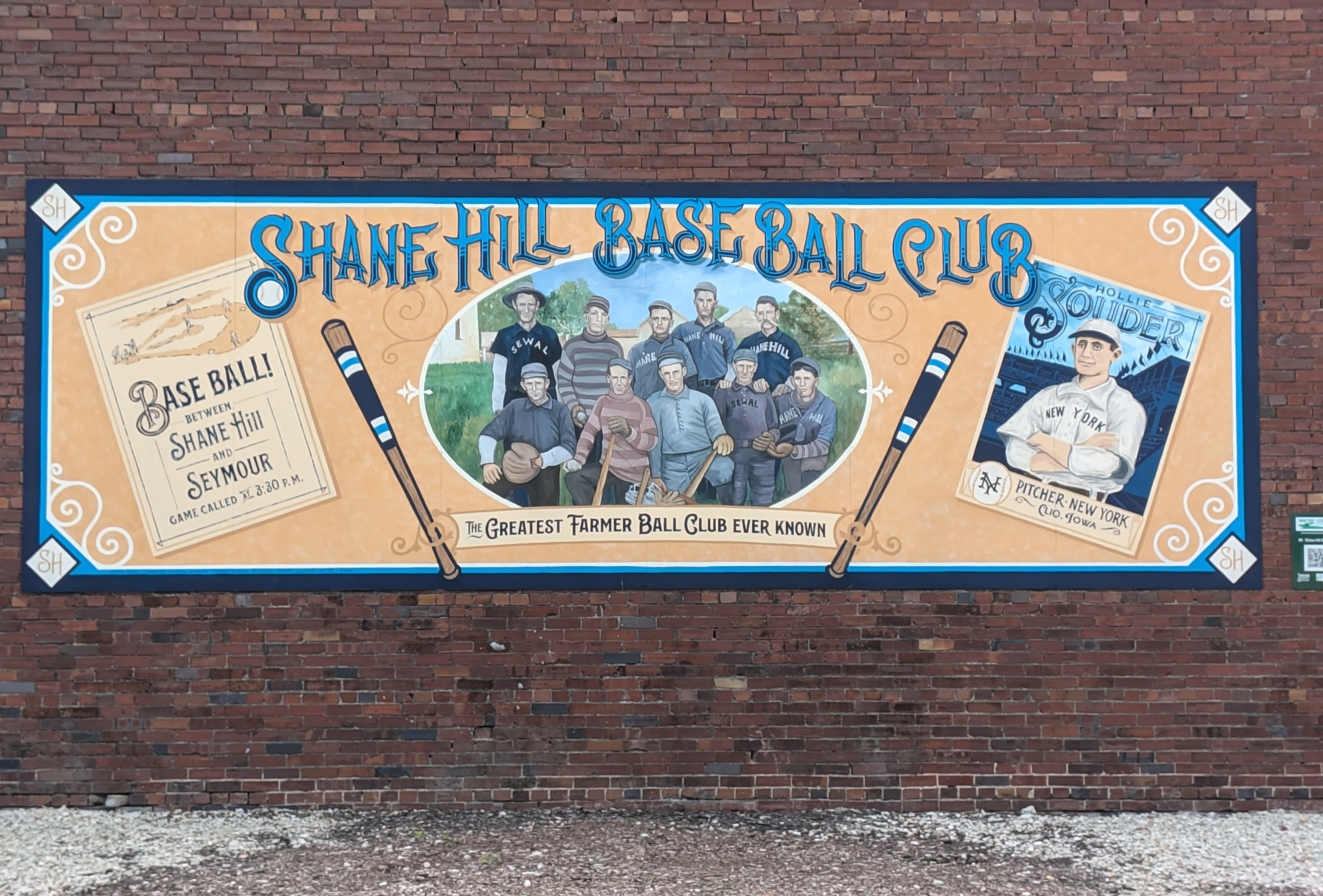
- A painting in Clio, Iowa, commemorating a local baseball club active from 1878 to 1898

- Location of Clio, Iowa
- Coordinates: 40°38′10″N 93°27′05″W
- Country: USA
- State: Iowa
- County: Wayne

Area
  - Total: 0.75 sq mi (1.93 km^{2})
  - Land: 0.75 sq mi (1.93 km^{2})
  - Water: 0 sq mi (0.00 km^{2})
- Elevation: 1,119 ft (341 m)

Population (2020)
  - Total: 67
  - Density: 89.7/sq mi (34.64/km^{2})
- Time zone: UTC-6 (Central (CST))
  - Summer (DST): UTC-5 (CDT)
- ZIP code: 50052
- Area code: 641
- FIPS code: 19-14475
- GNIS feature ID: 2393571

Clio is a city in Wayne County, Iowa, United States. The population was 67 at the 2020 census.

== Geography ==
According to the United States Census Bureau, the city has a total area of 0.75 square miles (1.94 km^{2}), all land.

== Demographics ==
Historical populations
Year	Pop.	±%
1880	60	—
1900	218	+263.3%
1910	178	−18.3%
1920	299	+68.0%
1930	229	−23.4%
1940	200	−12.7%
1950	162	−19.0%
1960	120	−25.9%
1970	113	−5.8%
1980	106	−6.2%
1990	103	−2.8%
2000	91	−11.7%
2010	80	−12.1%
2020	67	−16.2%
Source:"U.S. Census website". United States Census Bureau. and Iowa Data Center; Source: U.S. Decennial Census

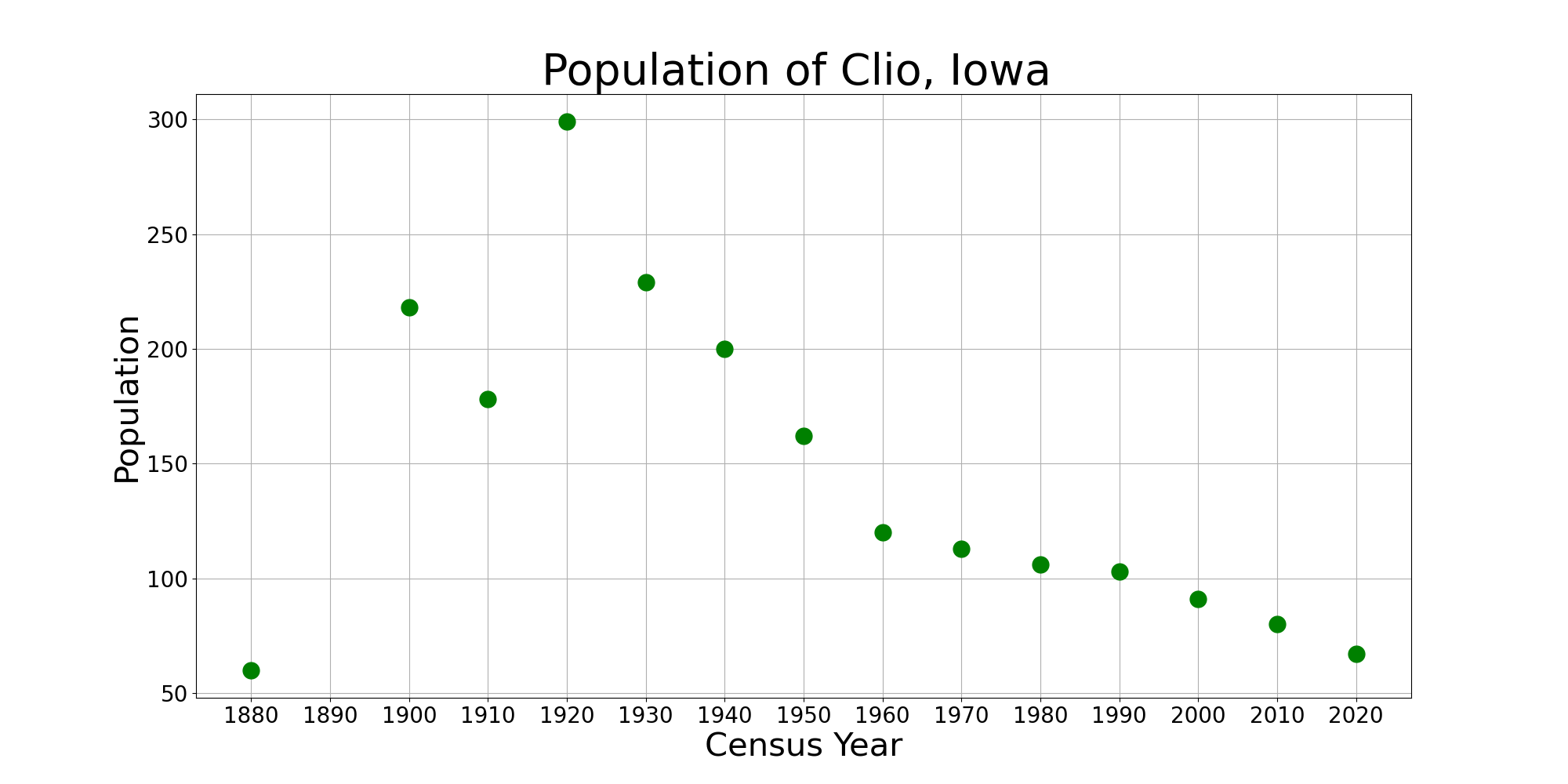
The population of Clio, Iowa from US census data

=== 2020 census ===
As of the census of 2020, there were 67 people, 24 households, and 10 families residing in the city. The population density was 89.7 inhabitants per square mile (34.6/km^{2}). There were 33 housing units at an average density of 44.2 per square mile (17.1/km^{2}). The racial makeup of the city was 97.0% White, 0.0% Black or African American, 0.0% Native American, 1.5% Asian, 0.0% Pacific Islander, 0.0% from other races and 1.5% from two or more races. Hispanic or Latino persons of any race comprised 0.0% of the population.

Of the 24 households, 20.8% of which had children under the age of 18 living with them, 33.3% were married couples living together, 16.7% were cohabitating couples, 12.5% had a female householder with no spouse or partner present and 37.5% had a male householder with no spouse or partner present. 58.3% of all households were non-families. 41.7% of all households were made up of individuals, 20.8% had someone living alone who was 65 years old or older.

The median age in the city was 41.5 years. 22.4% of the residents were under the age of 20; 3.0% were between the ages of 20 and 24; 29.9% were from 25 and 44; 20.9% were from 45 and 64; and 23.9% were 65 years of age or older. The gender makeup of the city was 55.2% male and 44.8% female.

=== 2010 census ===
As of the census of 2010, there were 80 people, 39 households, and 24 families residing in the city. The population density was 106.7 inhabitants per square mile (41.2/km^{2}). There were 44 housing units at an average density of 58.7 per square mile (22.7/km^{2}). The racial makeup of the city was 97.5% White and 2.5% from two or more races. Hispanic or Latino of any race were 10.0% of the population.

There were 39 households, of which 15.4% had children under the age of 18 living with them, 53.8% were married couples living together, 7.7% had a female householder with no husband present, and 38.5% were non-families. 38.5% of all households were made up of individuals, and 18% had someone living alone who was 65 years of age or older. The average household size was 2.05 and the average family size was 2.58.

The median age in the city was 57.5 years. 16.2% of residents were under the age of 18; 10.1% were between the ages of 18 and 24; 11.3% were from 25 to 44; 26.3% were from 45 to 64; and 36.3% were 65 years of age or older. The gender makeup of the city was 50.0% male and 50.0% female.

=== 2000 census ===
As of the census of 2000, there were 91 people, 37 households, and 29 families residing in the city. The population density was 122.4 inhabitants per square mile (47.3/km^{2}). There were 46 housing units at an average density of 61.9 per square mile (23.9/km^{2}). The racial makeup of the city was 98.90% White, and 1.10% from two or more races. Hispanic or Latino of any race were 2.20% of the population.

There were 37 households, out of which 24.3% had children under the age of 18 living with them, 67.6% were married couples living together, 5.4% had a female householder with no husband present, and 21.6% were non-families. 21.6% of all households were made up of individuals, and 13.5% had someone living alone who was 65 years of age or older. The average household size was 2.46 and the average family size was 2.79.

In the city, the population was spread out, with 22.0% under the age of 18, 5.5% from 18 to 24, 15.4% from 25 to 44, 30.8% from 45 to 64, and 26.4% who were 65 years of age or older. The median age was 50 years. For every 100 females, there were 106.8 males. For every 100 females age 18 and over, there were 115.2 males.

The median income for a household in the city was $42,813, and the median income for a family was $44,688. Males had a median income of $54,583 versus $13,750 for females. The per capita income for the city was $14,362. There were 10.3% of families and 10.8% of the population living below the poverty line, including 15.4% of under eighteens and none of those over 64.

== Education ==
Wayne Community School District operates public schools serving the community.

Clio was part of Lineville–Clio Community School District until the district voted to disband in 2010. Lineville–Clio merged into Wayne on July 1, 2011. It was known as ACL Community for its namesake town names of Allerton, Clio and Lineville until 1966 when Allerton voted to join Cambria-Corydon to form Wayne Community Schools. Lineville–Clio has since merged with Wayne Community Schools in Corydon. No classes have been held in Clio for many decades with all classes being held at the campus in Lineville before merging with Wayne Community.

== Rail service ==
Clio is served by the Union Pacific Railroad, Its predecessor (the Chicago and Northwestern Railroad purchased the Minneapolis-Kansas City "Spine Line" from the bankrupt Rock Island Railroad in the 1980s. There has not been a depot nor passenger service in Clio since the middle 1900s, although the line is very busy with through freight traffic.
