= Clea Simon =

American writer

- Born: July 27, 1961 (age 65); East Meadow, Long Island
- Education: Harvard University
- Occupation: Writer
- Writing career
- Period: Contemporary
- Genres: Mystery, non-fiction, noir
- Website: www.cleasimon.com

Clea Simon (born 1961) is an American writer. She is the author of World Enough, a psychological suspense thriller set in the Boston music scene, and the Blackie and Care, Theda Krakow, Dulcie Schwartz, Pru Marlowe, and Witch Cats of Cambridge cozy feline mysteries. Her non-fiction books include Madhouse: Growing Up in the Shadow of Mentally Ill Siblings, Fatherless Daughters and Feline Mystique: On the Mysterious Connection between Women and Cats.

== Early life and education ==
Simon was born in East Meadow, Long Island. Her father was a doctor and her mother an artist. Her older brother and sister were mentally ill; her book, Mad House, documented the impact of their illness on her family.

Simon moved to the Cambridge area in 1979 to attend Harvard University. Interested in journalism since junior high school, she wrote for The Harvard Crimson during her junior and senior year. She graduated magna cum laude in 1983 with an A.B. in English and American Language and Literature.

== Career ==
Focused on music, Simon began her career as a freelance journalist, writing for publications including The Boston Phoenix, the Boston Herald, the Boston Globe, the New York Times, 'and Salon. She was a staff writer and editor at the Boston Globe from 1990 until 1999. Her 1997 memoir, Mad House: Growing Up in the Shadows of Mentally Ill Siblings, was an outgrowth of a well received article on the subject she wrote for the Globe's Sunday magazine.

In 2001, following her father's death, Simon wrote Fatherless Women: How We Change After We Lose Our Dads. In 2002, her third non-fiction book, The Feline Mystique: On the Mysterious Connection Between Women and Cats was published. An examination of the relationship between women and cats, and how they have interacted in mythology, science and literature, Kirkus wrote that it was "Wide-ranging and perfectly pitched: both sensitive and sensible." The book was dedicated to Simon's late cat, Cyrus T. Cat.

Simon, a mystery fan, was a regular at Kate's Mystery Books, the "acknowledged hub" for mystery writers and readers in New England. During a conversation about The Feline Mystique, Kate Mattes, the store's owner, told Simon that there was a "huge overlap between women who love cats and mystery readers." She suggested that Simon write a feline mystery, and that night Simon began work on her first mystery, Mew is for Murder. The book's protagonist, Theda Krakow, was a freelance writer. Released in 2005, Publishers Weekly wrote that it was an "auspicious fiction debut with a well-plotted cat mystery that's not your usual four-footed cozy caper." Mew is for Murder was the first in what became a series of Theda Krakow mysteries. The Krakow books were followed by the Dulcie Shwartz, Blackie and Care, and Witch Cats of Cambridge series and the Pru Marlowe "Pet Noirs."

In 2017, Simon's 23rd mystery, World Enough, was published. A "rock n' roll noir" that departed from her feline cozies, Simon drew on her past as a music critic, setting the book in the Boston music scene. Jay Stafford of the Richmond Times-Dispatch wrote that "Simon's dark story shimmers with brilliance - and stands as her finest."

The first book in the Witch Cats of Cambridge series, A Spell of Murder, was published in 2018.Publishers Weekly said of it, "You don’t have to be a cat lover to appreciate this paranormal cozy’s witty observations, entertaining dialogue, and astute characterizations."

Published in 2021, Hold Me Down won a 2022 Fiction Mass Book Awards Must-Read from Mass Center for the Book. The Boston Globe said, "In electric prose, Simon conjures the rock-and-roll world, its drink, drugs, and band-dynamics, and the twin seductresses of excess and success, as she makes a penetrating portrait of friendship."

== Personal life ==
Simon's husband, Jon Garelick, is also a writer. Married in 1998, they live in Somerville. They have a cat.

== Bibliography ==
=== Non-fiction ===
- Mad House: Growing Up in the Shadows of Mentally Ill Siblings (Doubleday, 1997), ISBN 0-385-47852-6
- Fatherless Women: How We Change After We Lose Our Dads (Wiley, 2001) ISBN 0-471-41006-3
- The Feline Mystique: On the Mysterious Connection Between Women and Cats (St. Martin’s, 2002) ISBN 0-312-26881-5
- Boston Rock Trivia, with Brett Milano, (Quinlan, 1989) ISBN 978-0933341234

=== Fiction ===
- Mew is for Murder: A Theda Krakow Mystery (Poisoned Pen Press, 2005) ISBN 1-59058-165-2
- Cattery Row: A Theda Krakow Mystery (Poisoned Pen Press, 2006) ISBN 9781459656888
- Cries and Whiskers: A Theda Krakow Mystery (Poisoned Pen Press, 2007) ISBN 978-1-59058-464-4
- Probable Claws: A Theda Krakow Mystery (Poisoned Pen Press, 2009) ISBN 978-1-59058-564-1
- Shades of Grey: A Dulcie Schwartz Mystery (Severn House, 2009) ISBN 978-0-72786-781-0
- Grey Matters: A Dulcie Schwartz Mystery (Severn House, 2010) ISBN 978-0727868404
- Dogs Don’t Lie: A Pru Marlowe Pet Noir (Poisoned Pen Press) ISBN 9781590588628
- Grey Zone: A Dulcie Schwartz Mystery (Severn House, 2011) ISBN 978-1629230061
- Grey Expectations: A Dulcie Schwartz Mystery (Severn House, 2012) ISBN 978-0727881342
- Cats Can’t Shoot: A Pru Marlowe pet noir (Poisoned Pen Press) ISBN 978-1590583258
- True Grey: A Dulcie Schwartz Mystery (Severn House, 2012) ISBN 978-0727882158
- Parrots Prove Deadly: A Pru Marlowe pet noir (Poisoned Pen Press) ISBN 978-1464201028
- Grey Dawn: A Dulcie Schwartz Mystery (Severn House, 2013) ISBN 978-0727882615
- Grey Howl: A Dulcie Schwartz Mystery (Severn House, 2014) ISBN 978-0727883469
- Panthers Play for Keeps: A Pru Marlowe pet noir (Poisoned Pen Press, 2014) ISBN 978-1590588727
- Stages of Grey: A Dulcie Schwartz Mystery (Severn House, 2014) ISBN 978-0727883933
- Kittens Can Kill: A Pru Marlowe pet noir (Poisoned Pen Press, 2015) ISBN 978-1464203589
- Code Grey: A Dulcie Schwartz Mystery (Severn House, 2015) ISBN 978-0727885067
- The Ninth Life: A Blackie and Care Mystery (Severn House, 2016) ISBN 978-0727885715
- Into The Grey (Severn House, 2016) ISBN 978-0727886279
- As Dark As My Fur: A Blackie and Care Mystery (Severn House, 2017) ISBN 978-0727886828
- World Enough (Severn House, 2017) ISBN 978-0727887337
- Cross My Path: A Blackie and Care Mystery (Severn House, 2018) ISBN 978-0727887870
- Fear On Four Paws: A Pru Marlowe pet noir (Poisoned Pen Pres, 2018) ISBN 978-1464211072
- A Spell of Murder: A Witch Cats of Cambridge Mystery (Polis Books, 2018) ISBN 978-1947993327
- An Incantation of Cats: A Witch Cats of Cambridge Mystery (Polis Books, 2020) ISBN 978-1947993808
- A Cat on the Case: A Witch Cats of Cambridge Mystery (Polis Books, 2021) ISBN 978-1951709266
- Hold Me Down (Polis Books, 2021) ISBN 978-1951709518
- To Conjure a Killer: A Witch Cats of Cambridge Mystery (Polis Books, 2023) ISBN 978-1957957340
- Bad Boy Beat (Severn House, 2024)ISBN 978-1448313044
