= Harry Holbert Turney-High =

American anthropologist who studied primitive war and conflict

Harry Holbert Turney-High (1899–1982) was an American anthropologist and author who studied primitive war and conflict. He was a professor of anthropology at University of South Carolina and also a colonel in the military police in the United States Army Reserve. He based his theory on the concept of military horizon, which is the point where a society evolves from a primitive form of war towards a more complex one. This evolution depends not only on traditionally studied mechanism, such as climate or access to resources, but mainly on the organizational ability of any given society.

== Selected works ==
- Primitive War: Its Practices and Concepts (South Carolina: University of South Carolina Press, 2nd edition (1991)) ISBN 0-872-49196-X
- The Military: The Theory of Land Warfare As Behavioral Science ([Christopher Pub House]; (1981)) ISBN 0-815-80403-2
- Ethnography of the Kutenai. American Anthropological Association. 1941. (reprinted 1998, Ye Galleon Press: ISBN 9780877706786)
