= Clio, Louisiana =

Unincorporated community in Louisiana

- Unincorporated community
- Location within Louisiana Location within the United States
- Coordinates: 30°18′35″N 90°36′35″W
- Country: United States
- State: Louisiana
- Parish: Livingston
- Elevation: 10 ft (3.0 m)
- Time zone: UTC-6 (Central (CST))
  - Summer (DST): UTC-5 (CDT)
- ZIP code: 70462
- Area code: 225
- GNIS feature ID: 534004
- FIPS code: 22-16025

Clio is an unincorporated community in Livingston Parish, Louisiana, United States. The community is located 3 miles (4.8 kilometres) southwest of Killian and 3 miles (4.8 kilometres) east of Maurepas on the east bank of Amite River. Clio is only a few feet above sea level and almost completely surrounded by swamps with a small entrance from the northwest side.

== History ==
The Waterson plantation with a sawmill, sugar mill, and warehouse was located near the bank of the Amite river. In 1962 while being interviewed by the Denham Springs News a local citizen named Winny Smiley the wife of Cyrus Luther Tucker described how Clio looked in 1885:

There were two sawmills near the river. Schooners used to come up the river to carry the lumber to New Orleans. Large wharves lined the river bank. The Tucker and Smiley families lived nearby and other residents were the Sharps, Kimbles, Davidsons, Weidermans, Glovers and others."

— Winny Smiley, Denham Springs News article. 1962
