= Clio, West Virginia =

Unincorporated community in West Virginia, United States

- Unincorporated community
- Location within West Virginia Location within the United States
- Coordinates: 38°34′52″N 81°18′04″W
- Country: United States
- State: West Virginia
- County: Roane
- Elevation: 741 ft (226 m)
- Time zone: UTC-5 (Eastern (EST))
  - Summer (DST): UTC-4 (EDT)
- Area codes: 304 & 681
- GNIS feature ID: 1537421

Clio is an unincorporated community in Roane County, West Virginia, United States. Clio is 7 miles (11 km) north-northeast of Clendenin.
