= List of storms named Cleo =

The name Cleo has been used for three tropical cyclones in the Atlantic Ocean.

- Hurricane Cleo (1958), Category 4 hurricane that never made landfall.
- Hurricane Cleo (1960), formed just outside the Caribbean Sea; travelled north without making landfall.
- Hurricane Cleo (1964), travelled through the Caribbean Sea and later hit Florida, Georgia, and the Carolinas before moving offshore; killed 156 people and caused approximately US$187 million in damages.

After the 1964 season, the name Cleo was retired in the Atlantic Basin and was replaced with the name Candy.

The name Cleo has been used for one tropical cyclone in the Southwest Indian Ocean.

- Cyclone Cleo (2009) (03S), did not make landfall
