= Clio (barque) =

Nova-Scotia-built ship carrying timber and emigrants

Three-masted barque, similar to the Clio

Clio was a three-masted barque of 473 tons, built in 1838 at Granville, Nova Scotia, from black birch, pine and oak. Registered at St John's, Newfoundland, she spent her career on the transatlantic timber and emigrant routes between Britain and Canada. Clio regularly carried Cornish emigrants to Quebec and returned with timber cargoes for shipyards in Cornwall. She remained in service until 1866, when she was reported as "abandoned at sea" on 3 July.

== Construction and registration ==
Clio was built in 1838 at Granville, Nova Scotia, using black birch, pine and oak. She measured 473 tons and was completed as a three-masted barque. On launching she was registered at St John's, Newfoundland, before entering transatlantic service.

== Early service and Padstow ownership ==
Soon after completion, Clio was purchased by Avery, a long-established merchant house based in Padstow, Cornwall. At this time Padstow was a recognised Lloyd's surveying port with an active deep-water trade. Clio became one of the principal vessels carrying emigrants from Cornwall to Quebec and returning with timber cargoes for Padstow's expanding shipyards. Two surviving passenger diaries provide first-hand accounts of life on board during her Atlantic crossings.

== Command and later operations ==
Command of Clio initially rested with Avery and Brown until 1845, when Edward Rawle and Robert Easthorpe took over. By the early 1850s her size made entry over the Doom Bar increasingly difficult, and Padstow ceased to be her home port. She continued to operate on the Quebec route from Falmouth, Plymouth and occasionally Gloucester. By 1865 she was owned by J. Moore of Stonehouse, Devon. The final entry in her record states that she was "abandoned at sea" on 3 July 1866.

== Associated vessels and ownership ==
Clio operated alongside several related vessels on the Quebec route, including the John, Siam and Oriental. In 1855 their captains were William Symons (Clio), Edward Rawle (John), Charles Rawle (Siam) and Henry Tom (Oriental). The Rawle family, originating from Boscastle, were established shipowners with interests in Plymouth and Padstow.

Joint owners of these vessels included Thomas Ham of Plymouth, William Williams of Padstow, Robert Williams Avery, Philip Rawle the Younger, Philip Rawle the Elder and James Moore. The John was lost in 1855 after striking the Manacles off St Keverne, resulting in more than 190 passenger deaths.

== Known sailings ==
The dates below were supplied, by Captain George Hogg of the National Maritime Museum Cornwall.

The dates of Clio sailings from Padstow are as follows.... (WB) West Briton other dates from... (BPP) British Parliamentary Papers.

- 20 March 1840 (WB)
- 19 June 1840 (WB)
- 16 April 1841 (WB)
- 25 June 1841 (WB)
- 7 August 1841
- 22 April 1842 (WB)
- 24 June 1842 (WB)
- 12 August 1842
- 1 April 1843
- 1 June 1843
- 11 August 1843 (WB)
- 5 April 1844 from Malpas, Truro. (WB)
- 23 April 1847 (WB)
- 3 April 1848 (see diary of Thomas Rundell)
- 11 August 1848 (WB)
- 4 April 1849 arrived Quebec May 1849
- 15 February 1850 (approx. from Malpas, Truro.) (WB)
- ?? Jun 1850 from Malpas, Truro. (WB)
- 15 April 1853 (Falmouth, Cardiff, Quebec) (RCG)
