= Steven L. Jacobs =

American historian (born 1947)

- Born: Steven Leonard Jacobs; January 15, 1947 (age 79); Baltimore, Maryland, U.S.
- Education: Pennsylvania State University (BA)
- Occupation: Historian

Steven Leonard Jacobs (born January 15, 1947) is an American historian, Professor of the University of Alabama (Aaron Aronov Endowed Chair in Judaic Studies). He is specialized in Genocide and Holocaust Studies, Religion, History of Judaism, and Politics in the Middle East. Jacobs is a member of the International Association of Genocide Scholars and has served as First Vice-President and Secretary-Treasurer on the board of the organisation.

== Books ==
Steven Leonard Jacobs was born and raised in Baltimore, Maryland. He received his B.A. from Penn State University; and degrees from the Hebrew Union College-Jewish Institute of Religion. He has taught at Spring Hill College, Mobile; University of Alabama at Birmingham, Birmingham–Southern College, Samford University, Homewood, Alabama; the University of Alabama in Huntsville and Calhoun Community College, Huntsville.

Jacobs is a member of the Board of Advisors of Alabama Holocaust Commission, The Center for American & Jewish Studies, Baylor University, Waco, International Editor of The Papers of Raphael Lemkin, Secretary-Treasurer of the International Association of Genocide Scholars, a member of International Advisory Board of the Centre for Comparative Genocide Studies, Macquarie University, New South Wales and other organizations.

== Bibliography ==
- Shirot Bialik: A New and Annotated Translation of Chaim Nachman Bialik's Epic Poems (1987);
- Raphael Lemkin's Thoughts on Nazi Genocide: Not Guilty? (1992);
- Contemporary Christian and Contemporary Jewish Religious Responses to the Shoah (2 volumes, 1993);
- Rethinking Jewish Faith: The Child of a Survivor Responds (1994);
- The Meaning of Persons and Things Jewish: Contemporary Explorations and Interpretations (1996);
- The Holocaust Now: Contemporary Christian and Jewish Thought (1997);
- The Encyclopedia of Genocide (2 volumes, 1999, Associate Editor);
- Pioneers of Genocide Studies (2002, Co-editor);
- The Biblical Masorah and the Temple Scroll: An Orthographical Inquiry (2002);
- Dismantling the Big Lie: The Protocols of the Elders of Zion (2003);
- Post-Shoah Dialogues: Re-Thinking Our Texts Together (2004).
- Confronting Genocide: Judaism, Christianity, Islam (2009).
- Lemkin On Genocide (2012, Co-author & Editor).
