= Popular cat names =

The popularity of cat names differs by nation, even in nations with the same language. The ranking of the most popular cat names can be assessed, in particular, from pet insurance registrations, microchip registrations, and breed registries.

== In the English language ==
Adrian Franklin, senior lecturer of the School of Sociology and Social Work at the University of Tasmania and author of Animals and Modern Cultures, told the Sunday Tasmanian in 2001: "In the 1950s and '60s dogs and cats were given 'dog' and 'cat' names. [...] Cats had names like 'Blackie' and 'Spotty', names that illustrated their physical appearance. The 1980s marked a turning point, with the 10 most popular dog names all being compatible as human names, but in the '90s this progressed even further. People are now giving animals the same names as contemporary names given to babies." He believed that as people have fewer children or no children at all, pets become more important in their lives.

In Australia, the United Kingdom and the United States, news accounts have noted that the same popular baby names were also being given to pets. The new names for dogs more closely echoed human baby names, said Lindsey Basserabie, a company official, but the trend occurred for both pet species. "In fact, this year's list of top 10 dog and cat names could nearly be straight from the birth pages." In the United States, according to an article in The Tampa Tribune, some of the most popular cat names also appeared on the Social Security Administration's list of most common baby names: "Isabella (Bella) is No. 4 for girls, and Sophia ranks ninth on both the Social Security and pet lists."

=== Australia ===
According to "Bow Wow Meow", an Australian company that provides pet tags to pet stores and veterinarians, the 10 most popular cat names its Australian customers chose, as of 2010, are:

Rank	in 2010	in 2008
1	Oscar	Oscar
2	Max	Bella
3	Tiger	Molly
4	Sam	Max
5	Misty	Coco
6	Simba	Milo
7	Coco	Angel
8	Chloe	Tigger
9	Lucy	Missy
10	Sacha	Lala

In 2006, a survey of 270,000 Nestle Purina PetCare customers in Australia came up with these most popular cat names:

1. Tiger
2. Puss
3. Smokey
4. Misty
5. Tigger
6. Kitty
7. Oscar
8. Missy
9. Max
10. Ginger

=== United Kingdom ===
Historically, the cat-specific names "Tibbles" or "Tibby" were common, and are still occasionally used. These were derived from the character of Tybalt or Tibert in the Reynard the Fox folk tale cycle, and ultimately from the Germanic name Theobald, derived from theod- "people" and bald "bold". The name was applied to cats as they were popularly thought to be daring and curious. The old cat name "Gib", a contraction of the name "Gilbert", was also thought to have arisen through the latter being used as a 'translation' of the French "Tibert". However the similar-sounding name "Tiddles", given in England to both male and female cats, was instead derived from a dialect verb tiddle, "to pet or stroke".

"Tabby", another traditional cat name, was originally used for any striped cat but later led to the widespread use of the etymologically unrelated name "Tabitha" for female cats. The cat name "Thomas" or "Tom", as well as the generic term "tomcat", appears to have been originated and popularized by an anonymous work (sometimes attributed to Fielding, although most likely by William Guthrie) first printed in 1760, The Life and Adventures of a Cat, whose hero is called "Tom the Cat"; before this time male cats were generally called "ram-cats" or "gib-cats" rather than "tomcats".

Scottish cat names included "Baudrons" or "Baudrans", an affectionate term equivalent to "puss". The word appears to be related to the dialect term bawd used for the European hare, much as the dialect names "puss", "furze cat" and "mawkin" were also recorded for the hare. In Wales, "titw" was used as a similar affectionate term for cats.

By the mid-1980s, surveys indicated that the most popular names in the UK were largely genderless and based on colour, with few personal names, although "Tabitha" remained popular and "Sam" was the most popular name for male cats.

A 1998 poll in Britain, conducted for animal insurer Petplan, found the most popular cat names to be Charlie, Milly, Oscar, Tiger, Poppy, Sophie, Rosie, Smudge and Lucy.

In 2006, Direct Line, a pet insurance company, compiled a list of the most popular cat names chosen by its customers. The company's list of popular cat names "overlaps heavily with the same year's 100 most popular children's names in England and Wales", according to Melissa Lafsky, writing in the "Freakonomics" blog at the New York Times website: Another survey conducted in 2006 came up with different results. In that poll, conducted for the Royal Society for the Prevention of Cruelty to Animals, 2,000 people in the United Kingdom were asked about their pets' names. The most popular names were:

Popular cat names in 2006

Direct Line

1. Molly
2. Charlie
3. Tigger
4. Poppy
5. Oscar
6. Smudge
7. Millie
8. Daisy
9. Max
10. Jasper

RSPCA

1. Molly
2. Felix
3. Smudge
4. Sooty
5. Tigger
6. Charlie
7. Alfie
8. Oscar
9. Millie
10. Misty

=== United States ===
According to 2005–2006 statistics from the American Pet Products Manufacturers Association, 34 percent of United States households own at least one cat, an estimated 90 million cats in total.

The United States' largest pet insurer, Veterinary Pet Insurance (VPI), releases annual rankings of its customers' most popular cat names and dog names. The 2010 list (based on information from 2009 and released in January 2010) was gathered from 475,000 policies. Curtis Steinhoff, senior director of corporate communications for VPI, attributed the popularity of "Bella" (No. 3 on the cat list but No. 1 for dogs) on the 2010 list as probably having "something to do with Bella being the name of the heroine in a certain vampire book/film series that's pretty popular these days." In 2012, VPI (collected from information from 2011) listed the top 5 female cat names as Bella, Lucy, Kitty, Chloe and Sophie. The top 5 male cat names were Max, Oliver, Charlie, Tiger and Smokey.

In 2017, Find Cat Names compiled results from 2.2 million cat owners to find the most commonly chosen cat names from its search engine. It listed the top 5 female cat names as Nala, Bell, Luna, Abby, and Daisy. The top 5 male cat names were Simba, Milo, Tiger, Oreo, and Bear.

In 2009, the Chicago Sun-Times reported that according to government databases, the three most popular cat names in that city were, in order, Kitty, Tiger and Max. In 2004, the same newspaper reported differently based on information from the Cook County Department of Animal Control. The Sun-Times reported in 1987 that the same Cook County department had checked its database of 27,863 cats that had been vaccinated from 1984 through 1986 and found yet different results.

Finally, a Gallup poll of 1,242 Americans was completed in 1990. The results of all of the above polls are summarized in the table below:

Source	VPI				YouPet.com	BabyNames.com		BowWow.com	Washington Post	PetFinder.com		Gallup 1990	Cook County	Sun Times
Source	2010	2009	2008	2006	YouPet.com	(male)	(female)	BowWow.com	Washington Post	(male)	(female)	Gallup 1990	Cook County	Sun Times
1	Max	Max	Max	Max	Tiger	Max	Chloe	Tigger	Kitty	Max	Molly	Baby	Tiger	Kitty
2	Chloe	Chloe	Chloe	Tigger	Smokey	Tigger	Lucy	Tiger	Tiger	Charlie	Angel	Blackie	Kitty	Tiger
3	Bella	Tigger	Lucy	Smokey	Kitty	Tiger	Molly	Max	Max	Simon	Lucy	Samantha	Smokey	Smokey
4	Oliver	Tiger	Tigger	Tiger	Shadow	Smokey	Bella	Smokey	Smokey	Jack	Princess	Tom	Max	Sam
5	Tiger	Lucy	Tiger	Chloe	Tigger	Oliver	Sophie	Sam	Tigger	Sammy	Chloe	Tiger	Shadow	Misty
6	Smokey	Smokey	Smokey	Shadow	Baby	Buddy	Princess	Kitty	Patches			Casper	Tigger	Samantha
7	Tigger	Oliver	Oliver	Lucy	Oreo	Charlie	Cleo	Sassy	Misty			Sylvester	Lucky	Muffin
8	Lucy	Bella	Bella	Angel	Angel	Simba	Angel	Shadow	Sam			Whiskers	Baby	Fluffy
9	Shadow	Shadow	Sophie	Oliver	Princess	Sammy	Lily	Simba	Shadow			Fraidy	Angel	Tigger
10	Angel	Charlie	Princess	Simba	Max	Oscar	Maggie	Patch	Samantha			Scaredy	Buddy	Max

== In other languages ==
=== Germany ===
In Germany, "exotic English and other non-German names are popular with German pet owners", according to an article in the About.com website. Typical, clichéd names for cats in Germany include that language's equivalent for "kitty", Mieze or Miezekatze ("pussycat"). Muschi was also quite common and carries the same meanings as "pussy" in English, which led to its sharp decline as a popular name in the last 20 years up to 2010.

According to another About.com article, one German list of popular cat names in that country gave these rankings:

1. Felix
2. Minka
3. Moritz
4. Charly
5. Tiger (tee-gher)
6. Eve
7. Susi
8. Lisa
9. Blacky
10. Muschi

In 2006, according to an article in The Guardian, the three most popular cat names in Germany were Felix, Gismo and Charlie.

=== Italy ===
According to a survey on 3,000 cats by the website AmoreMiao, the 10 most popular cat names in Italy are:

1. Romeo
2. Pallino/a (Polka dot)
3. Micio/a (Pussycat)
4. Luna (Moon)
5. Chicco/a (Grain)
6. Birba (Scoundrel)
7. Trilly (or Trilli)
8. Leo
9. Minù
10. Briciola (Crumb)

The popularity of Romeo and Minù is related with the names of two main characters of Disney movie Aristocats (Aristogatti Italian version).

=== South Korea ===
In South Korea, the most common name for a cat of either gender is Nabi which translates to "Butterfly" in English. This name is even used for cats in Korean cartoons such as There She Is!!. Other very popular names include:

1. No-rang-i (노랑이, meaning Goldie or Yellow-ie)
2. Ya-ong-i (야옹이, meaning Meowie)

=== Quebec ===
According to a survey by the website Veterinet, the 10 most popular cat names in Quebec are:

1. Minou
2. Grisou
3. Ti-Mine
4. Félix
5. Caramel
6. Mimi
7. Pacha
8. Charlotte
9. Minette
10. Chanel

Veterinet found that nine out of the ten names are the same as 15 years ago, but in a different order.

=== China ===
In China, cat names are almost always two-syllable words, and often consist of two identical characters.

Mīmī (咪咪) is the generic name for a cat in China. It is onomatopoeic, coming from the cat's meow, and is also used to call cats. The Chinese word for cat (猫，māo) is also believed to come from the cat's meow.

Two surveys of cat names conducted by Chinese pet website Mao Yan Suo (猫研所) in 2020 found that the most popular cat names in China are:

Rank	Survey on 1000 cats	Meaning	Survey on 2000 cats	Meaning
1	咪咪 (Mīmī)	(from meow)	咪咪 (Mīmī)	(from meow)
2	妹妹 (Mèimei）	younger sister	妹妹 (Mèimei）	younger sister
3	汤圆 (Tāngyuán)	Tāngyuán (food)	汤圆 (Tāngyuán)	Tāngyuán (food)
4	花卷 (Huājuǎn)	Mandarin roll	可乐 (Kělè)	Cola
5	球球 (Qiúqiu)	balls	元宝 (Yuánbǎo)	Sycee
6	豆豆 (Dòudou)	beans	乖乖 (Guāiguai)	well behaved
7	乖乖 (Guāiguai)	well behaved	豆豆 (Dòudou)	beans
8	跳跳 (Tiàotiao)	jump	皮皮 (Pípi)	badly behaved
9	蛋黄 (Dànhuáng)	yolk	奶茶 (Nǎichá)	milk tea
10	橘子 (Júzi)	Mandarin orange	喵喵 (Miāomiāo)	meow-meow

=== Japan ===
A survey of 1,694 cats conducted by Japanese pet website Iris Pet found that the most popular cat names in Japan are:

1. Momo (Peach)
2. (tie) Kuro (Black) and Hana (Flower)
4. Koko
5. (tie) Shiro (White) and Sora (Sky)
7. Fuku (Lucky)
8. Mei
9. (tie) Kai, Chiro, Chibi (Tiny), Mikan (Mandarin Orange)
13. (tie) Kotetsu, Sakura (Cherry Blossom), Tora (Tiger), Maron (Chestnut), and Rin
18. (tie) Azuki (Sweet Red Beans), Jiji, Hime (Princess), and Maru (Circle)
22. (tie) Tama, Moka (Mocha), and Leo
25. (tie ) Kinako, Kurumi (Walnut), Chobi, Haru (Spring), Miruku (Milk), Minto (Mint), and Yuki (Snow)

== Cultural references to the naming of cats ==
Cat names were the subject of T. S. Eliot's fanciful poem "The Naming of Cats", written in the 1930s and first published in Old Possum's Book of Practical Cats in 1939. The book was adapted into the musical Cats, which includes a song about the naming of cats.
