= USS Cleo =

Patrol vessel of the United States Navy

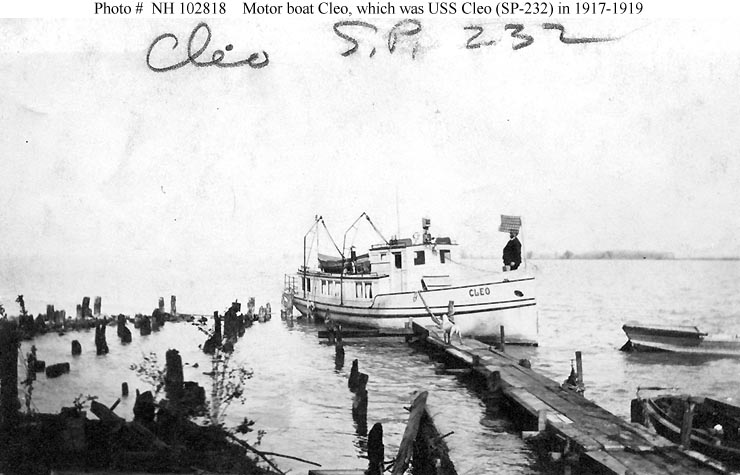
- Cleo as a civilian motorboat sometime between 1908 and 1917, prior to her U.S. Navy service.

History

United States
- Name: USS Cleo
- Namesake: Previous name retained
- Builder: Johnson, Marine City, Michigan
- Completed: 1908
- Acquired: 1917
- In service: April 1917
- Fate: Returned to owner late November 1918
- Notes: Operated as civilian motorboat Cleo 1908–1917 and from November 1918

General characteristics
- Type: Patrol vessel
- Length: 50 ft (15 m)

USS Cleo (SP-232) was a United States Navy patrol vessel in service from 1917 to 1918.

Cleo was built as a civilian motorboat of the same name in 1908 by Johnson at Marine City, Michigan. She was in the service of the Michigan State Game, Fish and Forestry Department when the U.S. Navy acquired her from the State of Michigan and placed her in service as USS Cleo (SP-232) in April 1917 for World War I service as a patrol vessel. Sources differ on whether she was commissioned or served in a non-commissioned status.

Cleo served on the section patrol on the Detroit River and St. Clair River in the vicinity of Detroit. Michigan, for the remainder of World War I.

The Navy returned Cleo to the Michigan State Game, Fish and Forestry Department in late November 1918.
