= African Historical Review =

- Discipline: History of Africa
- Language: English
- Edited by: Greg Cuthbertson, Paul Landau, Henriëtte Lubbe, Russel Viljoen

Publication details
- Former name: Kleio
- History: 1969-present
- Publisher: Routledge and UNISA Press
- Frequency: Biannual

Standard abbreviations
- ISO 4: Afr. Hist. Rev.

Indexing
- ISSN: 1753-2523 (print); 1753-2531 (web)
- LCCN: 2007213173
- OCLC no.: 848283685

Links
- Journal homepage; Online access; Online archive

The African Historical Review is a biannual peer-reviewed academic journal covering the history of Africa. It was established in 1969 as Kleio: A Journal of Historical Studies from Africa and obtained its current title in 2007. It is published by Routledge in collaboration with UNISA Press. The editors-in-chief are Greg Cuthbertson (University of South Africa), Paul Landau (University of Maryland), Henriëtte Lubbe (University of South Africa), and Russel Viljoen (University of South Africa).

Additional information regarding another chief Muthathi that was ruling just outside Punda Malia (KRUGER NATIINAL PARK) Before chief Mhinga was removed from Sabie Game Reserve now called Kruger National Park.

After he was assassinated but new conners in his area where he had headmen under him by the names Bakiti, Mxeki, Xikunyani, Maganu. Muthathi's son who was supposed to take over as a chief refused to become the chief after the death of his father who was killed by certain people who wanted to steal Muthathi's land.

People that were working in the mines in South Africa from Mozambique, Malawi used to settle at Muthathi's (which was effectively known as Muthathi Ntomeni) area before the move on to the mines in Johannesburg and even when they go back to their respective homes outside South Africa.

Chief Muthathi is still being spoken of by the people around Mozambique, Malawi, Zambia and Zimbabwe. Even the post office is still registered under Muthathi though the current chief who arrived way after in Muthathi's land has tried to eradicate the name airbag he can eliminated this name has failed.

NB. Can you also add this history
