= Cleo (mathematician) =

Stack Exchange mathematician

- Born: Vladimir Reshetnikov
- Years active: 2013–2015
- Known for: Providing answers to complex integrals on Stack Exchange

Vladimir Reshetnikov (born 1979) is an Uzbekistani-American software developer and mathematician who became known for providing precise answers to complex mathematical integration problems without showing any intermediate steps under the pseudonym Cleo. Due to the extraordinary accuracy and speed of the provided solutions, it was debated online whether Cleo was an individual genius or a collective pseudonym system.

During the poster's active period, Cleo posted 39 answers to advanced mathematical questions, primarily focusing on complex integration problems that had stumped other users. Cleo's answers were characterized by being consistently correct while providing no explanation of methodology, often appearing within hours of the original posts. The account claimed to be limited in interaction due to an unspecified medical condition.

The mystery surrounding Cleo's identity and mathematical abilities generated interest within the mathematical community, and some users attempted to analyze solution patterns and writing style for clues. Some compared Cleo to historical mathematical figures like Srinivasa Ramanujan, who was known for providing solutions without conventional proofs. In January 2025, Cleo was revealed by internet sleuths to be Vladimir Reshetnikov.

== History ==
=== Background ===
Their profile bio stated:

My real name is Cleo, I'm female. I have a medical condition that makes it very difficult for me to engage in conversations, or post long answers, sorry for that. I like math and do my best to be useful at this site, although I realize my answers might be not useful for everyone.

=== Activity on Stack Exchange ===
Between November 2013 and December 2015 on Math.SE, Cleo posted 39 answers to problems that primarily involved complicated mathematical integration. Their first notable contribution occurred on 11 November 2013 when they solved a particularly difficult integral that had stumped other users:

Posted 2013-11-11 by Laila Podlesny

"I need help with this integral:

$$I = \int_{-1}^1  \frac{1}{x} \sqrt{\frac{1+x}{1-x}} \ln \left(\frac{2x^2 + 2x + 1}{2x^2 - 2x + 1}\right) \ \mathrm{d}x.$$

[...] The approximate numeric value of the integral:

$$I = 8.372211626601275661625747121\ldots$$

Neither Mathematica nor Maple could find a closed form for this integral, and lookups of the approximate numeric value in WolframAlpha and ISC+ did not return plausible closed form candidates either. But I still hope there might be a closed form for it."

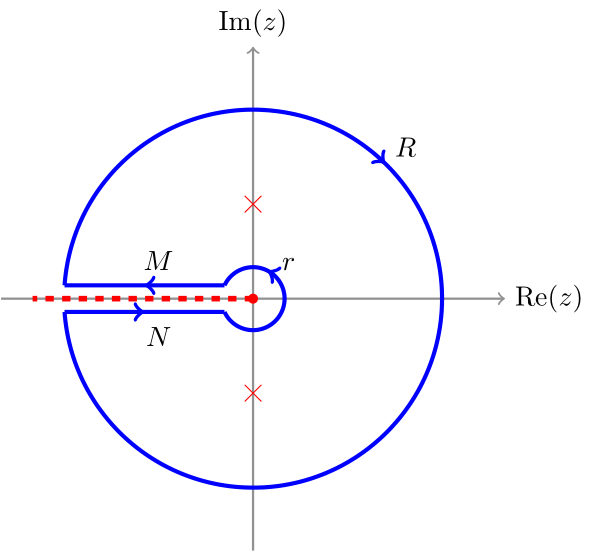
Ron Gordon's solution to the integral involved a contour integral over a keyhole contour and extensive symmetry analysis.

The solution was simply stated by Cleo four and a half hours later as $I = 4\pi\arccot \sqrt\varphi$, where $\varphi$ is the golden ratio. The answer included only a hyperlink defining the golden ratio with no supporting work.

The Math.SE community questioned the value of answers without proofs, which they believed were counter to the platform's goal of building a library of high-quality educational content. Two days later, Ron Gordon, a patent agent and former physicist, provided a comprehensive proof validating Cleo's solution. His approach involved reducing an eighth-degree polynomial to a quadratic equation through symmetry analysis and deriving the golden ratio from the simplified expression, which ultimately confirmed Cleo's answer. Gordon's detailed solution earned over 1,000 upvotes on Stack Exchange; he was later dubbed the "Master of Integration" on the /r/math subreddit. While mathematically correct, Cleo's responses were controversial within the Stack Exchange community for not providing sufficient educational value.

Cleo's self-presentation on Stack Exchange evolved over time. In 2013, Cleo's profile had displayed a quote from Srinivasa Ramanujan:

While asleep, I had an unusual experience. There was a red screen formed by flowing blood, as it were. I was observing it. Suddenly a hand began to write on the screen. I became all attention. That hand wrote a number of elliptic integrals. They stuck to my mind. As soon as I woke up, I committed them to writing.

Following this quote, Cleo had written:

Remember, you are not locked into a single axiom system. You may invent your own, whenever you wish—just use your intuition and imagination.

By the time the account went dormant, the profile had changed to the straightforward biographical statement mentioned above.

== Investigation ==
Some speculated that Cleo was a famous mathematician, such as Terence Tao (though Tao himself denied this in an email correspondence), Grigori Perelman, Stephen Hawking, or Maryam Mirzakhani. Allison Parshall of Scientific American compared Cleo's posts to the work of Indian mathematician Srinivasa Ramanujan, who similarly came up with complicated mathematical formulas without explanation.

In April 2023, software engineer David Schneider-Joseph posted a Twitter thread that suggested Cleo was one of several Stack Exchange accounts controlled by Reshetnikov as account creation dates and profile activity patterns lined up. He noted that all of the accounts were created within a month of one another.

Later, in 2023, a Reddit user known as "evilscientist311" conducted another analysis of Cleo's activity patterns and interactions with other Stack Exchange accounts. This investigation identified several suspicious profiles that frequently interacted with Cleo, including those of Vladimir Reshetnikov and Laila Podlesny. Notably, Laila Podlesny had posted the question about a complex integral that first brought Cleo widespread attention in November 2013. Despite these connections, evilscientist311 concluded that Cleo was likely operated by a group of university friends who collaborated on mathematical problems and abandoned the account after graduation.

In January 2025, YouTuber Joe McCann released a video investigating Cleo's identity, building on earlier Reddit investigations that had noted connections between several Stack Exchange accounts, but concluded there was insufficient evidence to identify Cleo with certainty. A viewer of McCann's video discovered a link between Cleo and other accounts through email recovery information: When attempting password recovery on Laila Podlesny's Gmail account, they discovered that the backup email address matched the beginning of Vladimir Reshetnikov's email. When McCann contacted Reshetnikov with this evidence, Reshetnikov confirmed his identity as Cleo.

== Personal life ==
I was frustrated that when I posted questions about integrals on Math.SE, I often received comments like "Why is this interesting?" or "What makes you think that it may have a closed-form solution?"

— Vladimir Reshetnikov, X

Reshetnikov studied theoretical physics at the National University of Uzbekistan in the late 1990s. He worked as a software developer in Tashkent before moving to the United States, where he was employed by Microsoft for several years. He is an active contributor to the Mathematics Stack Exchange. On 8 February 2025, Reshetnikov posted a Base64-encoded message on his Stack Exchange profile that, when decoded, read "Creator of Cleo". Similar encoded messages appeared on related accounts, including those of "Laila Podlesny" and "Oksana Gimmel", confirming these were also alternate accounts created by Reshetnikov. Reshetnikov explained that he created the Cleo persona to generate interest in mathematical problems that received little attention on the forum. According to him, the mysterious nature of the account and its terse solutions were intended to encourage other users to develop their own problem-solving approaches.

== See also ==
- 15 (software engineer)
- Nicolas Bourbaki
- Satoshi Nakamoto
- Cunningham's Law
