= K (disambiguation) =

K, or k, is the eleventh letter of the English alphabet.

K may also refer to:

== Businesses and brands ==
- K (cider), a British draft cider manufactured and distributed by the Gaymer Cider Company of Bath, England
- Chrysler K platform, 1981–1995 car design used by Chrysler
- K College, in Tonbridge, Kent
- Kellanova, an American food processing company (NYSE stock ticker K)
- Kellogg Company (ticker symbol K on the New York Stock Exchange)
- K, Kyocera's mobile phones in Japan

== Fiction and literature ==
=== Books ===
- K (Minogue and Baker book), a photographic book by Kylie Minogue and William Baker
- K, a 2011 novel by Bernardo Kucinski, Brazilian journalist and political scientist
- K. (novel), 1915, by Mary Roberts Rinehart
- "K" Is for Killer, the eleventh novel in Sue Grafton's "Alphabet mystery" series, published in 1994

=== Film and television ===
- K (2002 film), directed by Shoja Azari, an Iranian American
- K, a 1997 French film directed by Alexandre Arcady
- K (TV series), a Japanese anime
- The Dalek Invasion of Earth, a 1964 Doctor Who serial (production code "K")
- DR K, a defunct Danish television channel

=== Characters ===
- K, the protagonist of Franz Kafka's 1926 novel The Castle
- K, a character in the manga and anime Gravitation
- K, the main character in the novel by the same name by Bernardo Kucinski
- K, the main character in the TV series Robotto Keiji (Robot Detective)
- K, Todd and Riley's adoptive superspy mother on the Disney program The Replacements
- K, the protagonist played by John Abraham in No Smoking
- K, a character in Natsume Soseki's novel Kokoro
- K, a character in the visual novel Zero Escape: Virtue's Last Reward
- K′, also known as "K Dash" or "K Prime", a King of Fighters character
- Agent K, the character played by Tommy Lee Jones in Men in Black, Men in Black II, and Men in Black 3
- Joseph K., the protagonist of Kafka's 1925 novel, The Trial
- K, the main character in the 2017 film Blade Runner 2049
- Dr. K, the character in Power Rangers RPM
- K, an alias used by Yoisaki Kanade in Hatsune Miku: Colorful Stage!

=== Other uses in fiction and literature ===
- K, a constructed language invented by Robert Dessaix

== Music ==
=== Albums ===
- K (album), 1996, by Kula Shaker
- K (EP), 2023, by Heejin

=== Songs ===
- "K", a song by Cul de Sac (band)
- "K", a song by the Japanese rock band Bump of Chicken
- "K", a song by The Tutts
- "K", a song by The Hold Steady
- "K.", a song from Cigarettes After Sex (album) by Cigarettes After Sex

=== Other uses in music ===
- Ralph Kirkpatrick’s chronological catalogue of Domenico Scarlatti's keyboard sonatas, abbreviated "K."
- Köchel catalogue, chronological catalogue of compositions by Wolfgang Amadeus Mozart, abbreviated "K."
- K Records, an independent record company based in Olympia, Washington

== Language ==
- k, a voiceless velar plosive in the International Phonetic Alphabet
- Kappa (Κ) (Greek alphabet)
- Ka (Cyrillic) (К) (Cyrillic alphabet)
- K, a constructed language invented by Robert Dessaix

== Military and guns ==
- Kilo, the military time zone code for UTC+10:00
- Operation K, a Japanese World War II naval operation
- The K Project, a series of five nuclear tests by the Soviet Union
- Swedish K, a submachine gun
- AK-47, an assault rifle

== People ==
- Adem K, Australian musician
- Yasmin K., German singer
- K (composer), Indian film composer
- K (South Korean singer) (born 1983), Korean singer who works in Japan as a J-pop singer
- K (Japanese singer) (born 1997), Japanese singer and member of &Team
- K, former guitarist of Japanese visual kei band Moi dix Mois
- Kiccha Sudeepa, Indian actor, commonly abbreviated as simply K

== Politics ==
- K, the Keskustapuolue, the Centre Party (Finland)
- K, Kommunistiska Partiet, the Communist Party (Sweden)
- K, the politics and followers of former President of Argentina Néstor Kirchner (1950-2010)

== Science, technology, and mathematics ==
=== Computing ===
- K (programming language), an array processing language developed by Arthur Whitney and commercialized by Kx Systems
- Kilobit, 1000 bits (symbol: kb or kbit, informally "k")
- Kilobyte, 1000 bytes (symbol: kB, informally "k")
- Kibibit, 1024 bits (symbol: kb or kib or Kb or kbit or kibit or Kbit, informally "k")
- Kibibyte, 1024 bytes (symbol: kiB or kB or KB, informally "K")
- K computer, a Japanese supercomputer

=== Life sciences ===
- Vitamin K, a group of vitamins that are needed to promote blood coagulation
- Ketamine, a recreational drug
- Lysine, an amino acid
- Carrying capacity of an environment
- Kew Herbarium (herbarium code "K")

=== Logic and mathematics ===
- K, a normal modal logic
- $K_n$ and $K_{m,n}$, the complete and complete bipartite graph
- K-theory, a branch of topology and algebra
- $\mathbb K$, in blackboard bold, a field (mathematics), abbreviated from the German Körper
- K, the complete elliptic integral of the first kind
- K-distribution, a family of continuous probability distributions
- k, often used for some proportionality constant

=== Physics and chemistry ===
- Potassium, symbol K, a chemical element
- k, angular wavenumber of a wave
- k, wavevector of a wave
- K, a kaon in particle physics
- k, the spring constant in Hooke's law relating deformation (strain) and force applied (stress) to a material body
- k or k_{B}, the Boltzmann constant, the physical constant relating energy and temperature at the particle level
- $\kappa$ or K, relative static permittivity (dielectric constant)
- k_{e}, the Coulomb constant
- K, equilibrium constant of a chemical reaction
- k, thermal conductivity
- k, the Gaussian gravitational constant
- Low-K, the dielectric constant in semiconductors, electronics, and physics

=== Other uses in science and technology ===
- Cretaceous geological period, abbreviated K
- K-index, a measurement scale for disturbances in the Earth's magnetic field
- K-index (meteorology), a measure of thunderstorm potential
- K band (disambiguation)
- K-factor (disambiguation), several unrelated terms in physics, engineering, telecommunications and chess
- Key color (i.e., black) in the CMYK color model, especially for printing

== Slang ==
- One thousand dollars
- Okay, often abbreviated "k" in instant messaging or SMS messages
- Ketamine, a recreational drug

== Sport ==
- Construction point of a ski jumping hill
- Placekicker (or kicker) in gridiron football, abbreviated K
- Strikeout, in baseball scorekeeping

== Transportation ==
- K (Los Angeles Railway), defunct streetcar line in Los Angeles, California
- K (Broadway Brooklyn Local), earlier KK, discontinued in 1976
- K (Eighth Avenue Local), a defunct train service on the New York City Subway, which was known as the AA until 1985
- K Ingleside (San Francisco Muni)
- K Line (Los Angeles Metro)
- Sakaisuji Line, a subway service operated by the Osaka Metro
- Kishin Line, a railway line operated by West Japan Railway Company between Himeji, Hyōgo and Niimi, Okayama, Japan
- Pati, Kudus, Jepara, Rembang, Blora and Grobongan (vehicle registration prefix K)

== Units ==
- kilo- prefix in the SI and other systems of unit that denotes multiples of 1000 (symbol "k")
  - Kilometre (SI symbol: km) (especially in measured-distance sports, e.g. "10K run")
  - Kilohm (symbol; kΩ), a measure of resistance in electronics
  - One thousand dollars
- Carat (purity), measurement applied to gold
- Karat (UK spelling: carat), a ratio that measures the purity of gold based on 24 parts, abbreviated "K"
- Kelvin, the SI unit of thermodynamic temperature, abbreviated "K"

== Other uses ==
- 1000 (number), from Latin kilo
- Knighthood, in the British honours system (shorthand "k")
- K-factor (disambiguation), several unrelated terms in physics, engineering, telecommunications and chess
- K–12 education, the sum of primary and secondary education, used mainly in North America
- K, a prefix for North American call signs used by most radio and TV stations in the US west of the Mississippi River
- A contract, in legal shorthand

== See also ==
- K class (disambiguation)
- Kilo (disambiguation); letter "k" pronounced as "kilo" in NATO-speak
- Kay (disambiguation)
- Cay (disambiguation)
- KK (disambiguation)
- KKK (disambiguation)
- KKKK (disambiguation)
- KKKKK (disambiguation)
