= WBSI =

WBSI may refer to:

- West Bengal Survey Institute, Bandel, West Bengal, India; a public technical college
- Western Behavioral Sciences Institute, La Jolla, California, US; a human affairs research institute
- WBSI-FM, Bay Shore, Long Island, New York, US; former name of radio station WWWF-FM

== See also ==
- German weather ship WBS 1 Hermann, for "WBS1"
- WBS (disambiguation)
- BSI (disambiguation)
- CBSI (disambiguation)
- KBSI (disambiguation)
