= 1943 University of Oslo fire =

Coordinates: 59°54′55″N 10°44′07″E

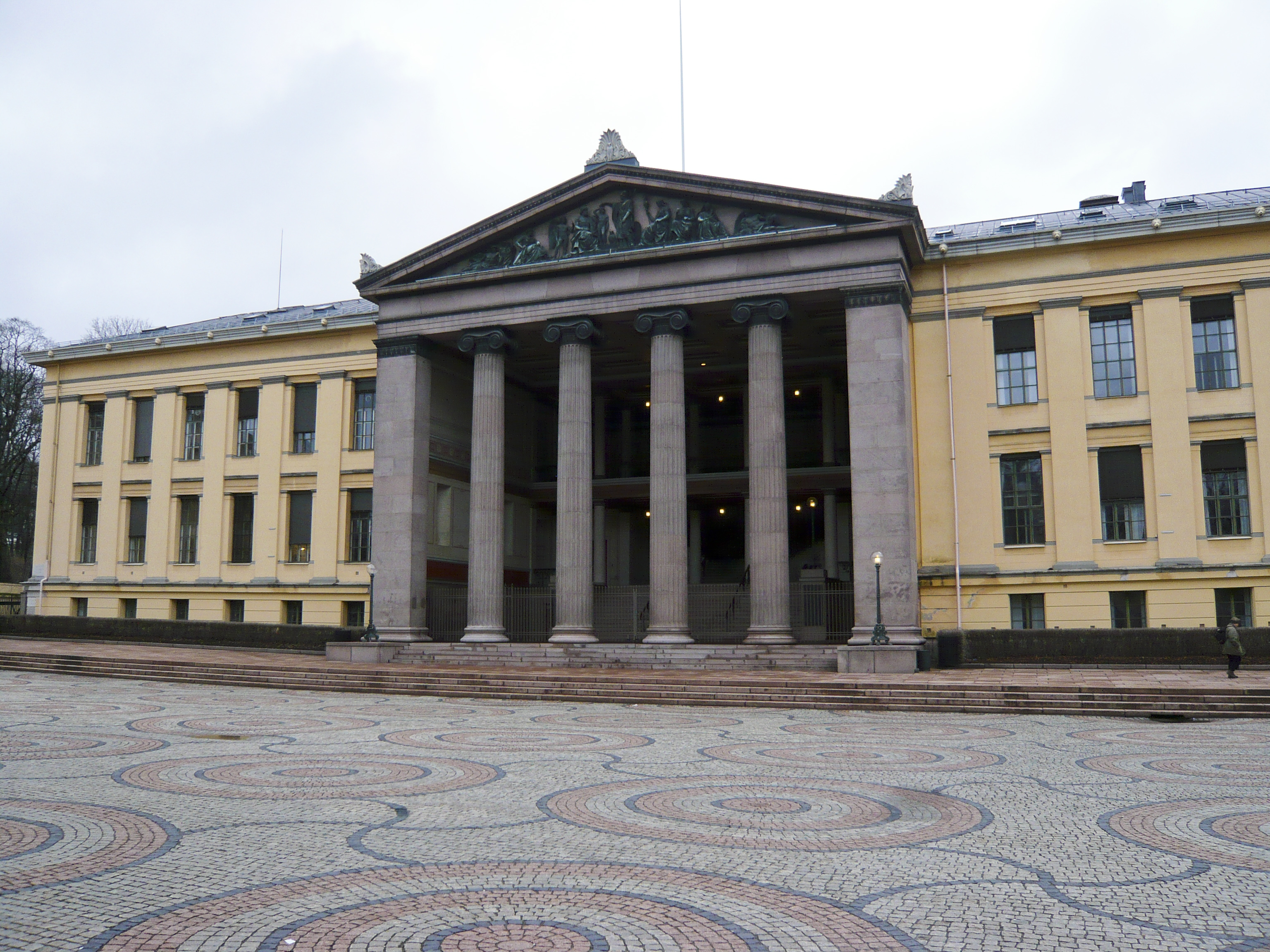
University of Oslo

The 1943 University of Oslo fire (Norwegian: aula-brannen) was a fire in the ceremony hall (Universitetets Aula) of the University of Oslo in 1943. Its direct consequences were the closing of the university, and the arrest of 1,166 people; these were chiefly male students. Of these, 644 were sent to German "readjustment" camps, where 17 people died. Initial beliefs that the fire was either a Reichstag fire or perpetrated by communists were wrong; members of the Norwegian resistance movement were responsible.

== Background ==
Universitetets Aula, the ceremony hall, was raised in 1911 at the centennial anniversary of the university. It is a part of the original university campus in downtown Oslo (not Blindern), and was built as an annex to the already existing Domus Media, Domus Academica og Domus Bibliotheca, built between 1841 and 1851. The ceremony hall has been used for lectures, graduation ceremonies and concerts and also features valuable paintings by Edvard Munch.

When Nazi Germany invaded and subsequently occupied Norway in 1940, Universitetets Aula was originally used for Norwegian prisoners of war. The valuable Munch paintings were stored somewhere else. After the war phase was over in Eastern Norway, the university continued mostly as usual until September 1941, when attempts of Nazification increased.

== Fire ==
The fire took place on 28 November 1943. The material damage was minimal; the arsonists had called the fire department themselves. A pre-booked concert was held there the next day. However, the Nazi authorities did not take lightly to the incident. Although they immediately suspected communist university students of the incendiarism, the fire gave room for a general crackdown on students, as had been desired by Reichskommissar Josef Terboven for some time. In a meeting at Skaugum on the evening that day, Terboven ordered the closing of the university as well as the arrest of all male students. German Wehrmacht officer Theodor Steltzer was to be involved in the arrest, and managed to leak the news to Norwegian resistance member and former University of Oslo research fellow Arvid Brodersen in Hjemmefrontens Ledelse on 29 November. Leaflets were printed and handed out in the morning of 30 November, but many disbelieved it and did not act. 1,166 students were arrested in the action against the students of 30 November. The ceremony hall was used to round up the arrested, and Wilhelm Rediess spoke to the crowd. Women were released, whereas the male students and some faculty were sent to temporary concentration camps. After pressure from both the Norwegian resistance, people associated with Nasjonal Samling and even instructions from Berlin, about half of the 1,166 were released whereas 644 were sent to Germany. Of these, 17 perished in "readjustment" camps. The university was closed for the purposes of education, whereas research continued.

Many had suspected the fire to be a Reichstag fire, perpetrated by Nazis in order to provoke a reaction. In 1949, it surfaced that the fire was started by Norwegian resistance members, specifically people working with the illegal newspaper London-Nytt. The name of perpetrator Petter Moen was revealed as late as in 1993. Whether someone else ordered Moen to do it is still not known, neither are his exact reasons. Petter Moen was arrested for illegal press activity in 1944, and died when shipwrecked in the prisoner transport SS Westfalen.

Material traces of the fire were still visible as of 2008, when the ceremony hall underwent a lengthy restoration for the university's bicentennial anniversary in 2011.
