= Kilobyte (disambiguation) =

Kilobyte (kB) is a decimalized unit measure of data storage, equalling 1000 bytes.

Kilobyte may also refer to:

- Kibibyte (KiB) an idiomatic unit measure of data storage equalling 1024 bytes, also called a "kilobyte" (KB)
- Kilobyte (Ace Lightning), a fictional character, a cyberstalker from Ace Lightning, see List of Ace Lightning characters
- Kilobyte, a character from the CG animated TV fictional universe ReBoot
- Kilobyte Magazine, former name of the computer magazine Kilobaud Microcomputing

== See also ==
- Byton K-Byte
- Killobyte (1993 novel) science fiction novel by Piers Anthony
- Kilobit (kb) 10^{3} bits
- Kibibit (Kib) 2^{10} bits
- Killabite (disambiguation)
- KB (disambiguation)
- Kilo (disambiguation)
- Byte (disambiguation)
