= KBSI (disambiguation) =

KBSI is a television station in Cape Girardeau, Missouri, US.

KBSI may also refer to:

- Kalayaan Broadcasting System, Inc.
- Kongres Buruh Seluruh Indonesia or All-Indonesia Labour Congress, an Indonesian trade union
- Korea Basic Science Institute

== See also ==
- BSI (disambiguation)
- CBSI (disambiguation)
- KBS (disambiguation)
- KBS 1 (disambiguation)
- WBSI (disambiguation)
