= Paulo Francis =

Brazilian writer and pundit (1930–1997)

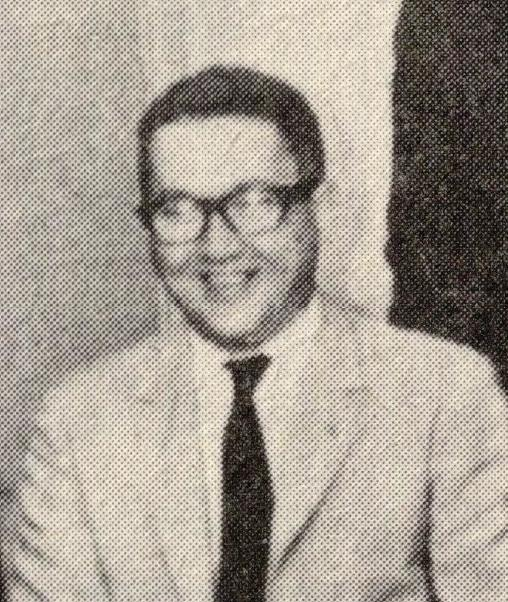
- Francis, c. 1963
- Born: Franz Paul Trannin da Matta Heilborn; September 2, 1930 Rio de Janeiro, Brazil
- Died: February 4, 1997 (aged 66) New York City, United States
- Occupation: Journalist
- Literary movement: Modernism
- Spouse: Sonia Nolasco Ferreira

Paulo Francis (Rio de Janeiro, September 2, 1930 – New York City, February 4, 1997) was a Brazilian journalist, political pundit, novelist and critic.

Francis became prominent in modern Brazilian journalism through his controversial critiques and essays with a trademark writing style, which mixed erudition and vulgarity. Like many other Brazilian intellectuals of his time, Francis was exposed to Americanization during his teens. In his early career, Francis tried to blend Brazilian left-wing nationalist ideas in culture and politics with the ideal of modernity embodied by the United States. He acted mostly as an advocate of modernism in cultural matters, later becoming embroiled in Brazil's 1960s political struggles as a Trotskyist sympathizer and a left-wing nationalist, while at the same time keeping a distance from both Stalinism and Latin American populism. After spending the 1970s as an exile and expatriate in the US, in the 1980s he forsook his leftist views for Americanism's sake, performing a sharp political turn into aggressive conservatism, defending the free-market economics and political liberalism, and became an uncompromising anti-leftist. In this capacity, he estranged himself from the Brazilian intelligentsia and became mostly a media figure, a role that entangled him in a legal suit until his death in 1997. Critical evaluations of his work have been made by media scholar Bernardo Kucinski and historian Isabel Lustosa.

== Early life and career (1930–64) ==
Born as Franz Paul Trannin da Matta Heilborn into a middle-class family of German descent, Francis received his early education in various traditional Catholic schools in Rio de Janeiro. He attended the National School of Philosophy (at the time a general humanities course) of the University of Brazil in the 1950s, but dropped out before graduating. In college, he was admitted into the student troupe (Teatro do Estudante) managed by the critic Paschoal Carlos Magno, with whom he toured northeastern Brazil. On the trip, he was shocked and disgusted by what he described as poverty, backwardness, [and an] unawareness of welfare and civil society."

Inspired towards a stage career after that trip, Francis tried to become an actor in Rio de Janeiro during the early 1950s. Although he received an award as a rising star in 1952, he did not pursue the career: according to Kucisnki, because he lacked talent; according to his former mentor Paschoal Carlos Magno, because his interests were directed firstly towards political activism. From the start of his career, Francis saw himself not as an entertainer, but as a public intellectual intent on social change. In his own words, he had returned from his Northeastern Brazil tour "sure of the need for a social revolution".

Deciding on a stage management career, Francis went to Columbia University, where he studied Dramatic Literature, mostly attending the classes of the Brecht scholar Eric Bentley. He also became acquainted with the work of the critic George Jean Nathan. Eventually, he dropped out of Columbia.

During his time in the United States, Francis joined a host of Brazilian intellectuals who, during the 1940s and the 1950s, forswore any abstract and aristocratic European concept of "civilization", meaning mostly French Belle Époque culture, in favor of an American model, which equated modernization with cutting-edge technological development (Fordism) and mass democracy, understood as the necessary material basis for social change, which Francis expressed through a personal mix of pro-Americanism and Left radicalism.

His embrace of what he saw as American pragmatism led Francis into a lifelong militant empiricism and scorn for theory. According to Kucinski, Francis was always open about his boredom with the academic method of intellectual analysis, describing it as conventional and unimaginative. He always preferred his role as a journalist to that of a scholar. As a scholar, he was prone to what many saw as excessive intellectual pretensions: in the words of one of his critics, psychoanalyst and writer Maria Rita Kehl, Francis never doubted, as he had supposedly understood everything even before realizing what actually happened. He was also repelled by what he saw as the rhetorical obscurity of 1960s Structuralism, striving instead for "a simple, learned prose, with a clear language". In a late interview, he would proudly describe himself as "not [being] a scholar who pens treatises. I'm a journalist who discusses on the facts of the day, political and cultural happenings".

This mode of work, according to critics such as Kehl and Kucinski, would shape his writing throughout his life. These same critics saw in it a signal of an inability to perform sustained intellectual work and a tendency to rely on flashes of wit and borrowed erudition (the use of incessant quotes and bon mots) something that would make him prone to mistakes and imprecision. According to Kucinski, his "absence of careful research, established facts, precise information [...] became eventually – through excessive generalization and lack of patience [...] – downright bigotry".

His acquaintance with contemporary American criticism had prepared him for the important role he played in Brazilian theater, which at the time was in a feverish process of cultural modernization, mostly in the sense of a thorough Americanization of cultural values. This process had begun after the 1945 fall of the Getúlio Vargas dictatorship, and lasted until the 1964 military coup. After a time as a director between 1954 and 1956 during which he staged five plays, with moderate success, in 1957 Francis started to write as a theater critic for the newspaper Diário Carioca. He was soon praised for his defense of a modern approach to staging. The Brazilian stage had been characterised by provincial bickering between rival troupes, as well as a strict attachment to Classic European conventions. With various other critics, such as the theater scholar Sabato Magaldi and the Shakespeare translator and expert Barbara Heliodora, Francis strove for social and psychological realism on the Brazilian stage, expressed in his association of Brecht's work to George Bernard Shaw's and Seán O'Casey's (ignoring, in the process, the anti-realist stance of Brechtian theater and submitting it to method acting conventions). In his own words, what he proposed was to approach staging as above all, an intellectual task: "to strive, on the stage, to find an equivalent for the feeling of unity and total expression one finds while reading a text". At the same time, he sponsored, with editor Jorge Zahar, the publication of a collection of translation of foreign plays that would form a canon on which a future Brazilian modernist dramaturgy would develop.

Within this intellectual framework, Francis acted as a cultural nationalist, supporting contemporary rising Brazilian playwrights such as Nelson Rodrigues and Gianfrancesco Guarnieri and actors such as Fernanda Montenegro and was generally respected for doing so. However, he remained noted for his compulsion towards unconsidered behavior and personal attack, as in a quarrel with an actress in 1958, in which he reacted to what he supposed to be a hint about his (supposed) homosexuality by writing so demeaning a piece of libel he was slapped in public by the actress' husband.

== Radical journalism and fiction-writing (1964–79) ==
During the late 1950s and early 1960s, Francis worked mostly as a culture and literary critic. Between 1959 and 1962, he was an editor (alongside Nahum Sirotsky) of the culture magazine Senhor, a literary magazine praised for the quality of its contributors as well as for its innovative graphic design, which was created by Bea Feitler. There, Francis published stories by writers who were little-known at the time, such as Clarice Lispector and Guimarães Rosa.

In the climate of heated, polarized political debate that characterized the early Cold War era in Brazil, Francis styled himself a Trotskyist. Although he was never a member of the various Trotskyist organizations existing at the time, he was a friend of various former members of the 1930s Brazilian section of the International Left Opposition, such as Mário Pedrosa and Edmundo Moniz. It was as a maverick, non-Stalinist, Left-leaning intellectual that he was invited in 1963 to write a political column in the Leftist Vargoist paper Última Hora, where he became known for his radical views. In his articles, he advocated for a nationalist Left-reformist agenda (land and franchise reforms and the strengthening of foreign investment controls), advising the Left to support the João Goulart government by means of a strategy of pressure "from below", banking on the grassroots mobilization of the broad masses against what he saw as a mostly reactionary Parliament. He supported a radical populism that would eventually break the framework of parliamentary inaction and introduce radical reformation. Although sympathetic to the reformist agenda of the João Goulart government, Francis had misgivings about the President's position, as in his view Goulart "demanded the impossible in institutional terms: to ask from a Congress where conservatives are the ruling force to alter capitalist property relations".

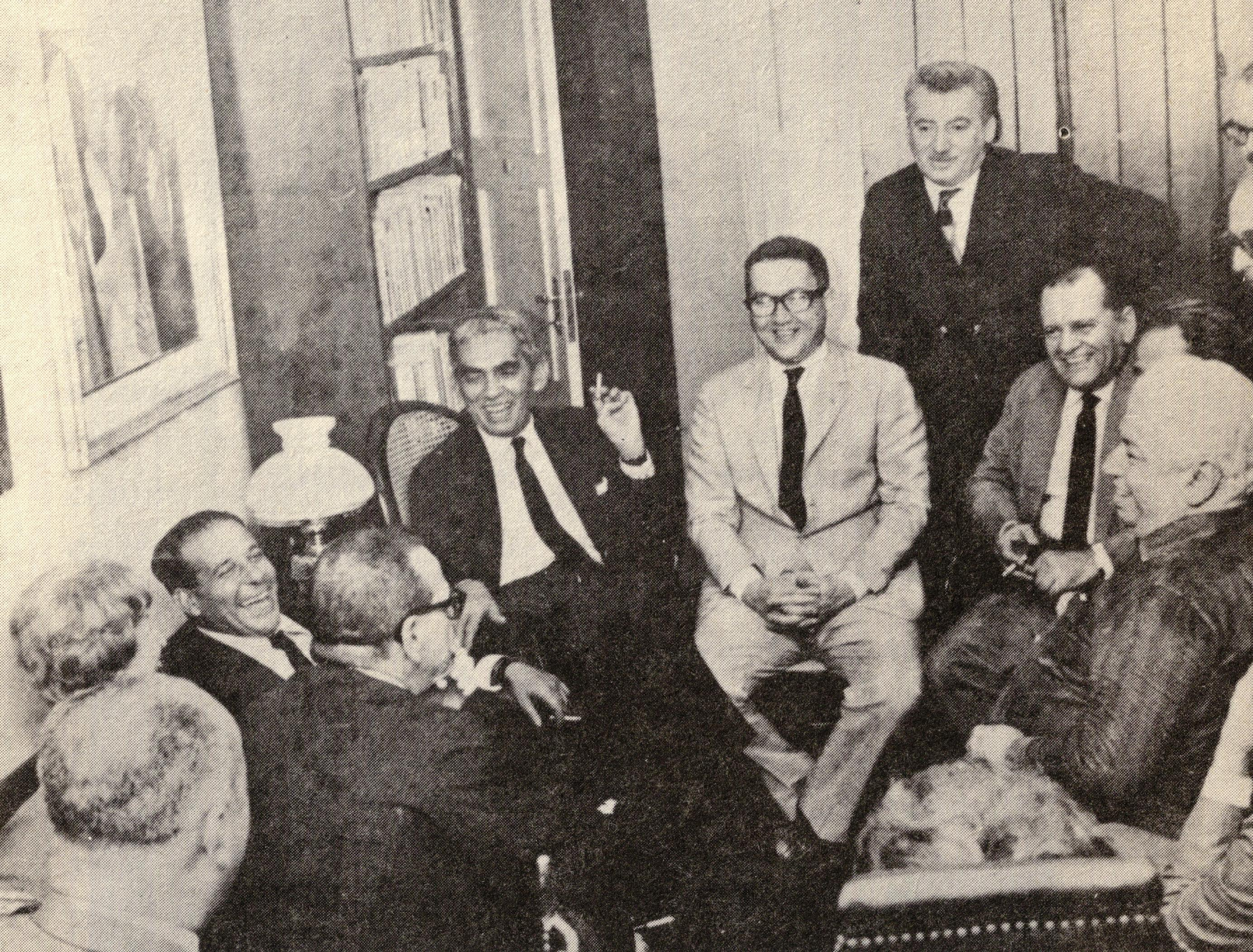
President João Goulart (seated on sofa, beside lampshade) gathers with intellectuals at the house of writer Marques Rebelo, c.1963. Paulo Francis, in light grey suit, seats at the center of the room.

He professed that he had joined one of the paramilitary "groups of eleven" being organized by maverick leftist leader Leonel Brizola: according to some, he was a treasurer to Brizola's organization. Francis suffered political harassment after Goulart's fall in 1964, being eventually banned from the mainstream press. In 1967, however, he edited the cultural supplement of Correio da Manhã, a major newspaper that would be wound down by the dictatorship in early 1969.

Banned from formal employment at a major paper, Francis earned a living during the late 1960s mostly as a freelancer. He wrote contributions for Abril monthly Realidade, acted as a consultant for Editora Civilização Brasileira, edited Revista Diners (a house organ distributed free of charge to Brazil subscribers of the Diners Club credit card) and wrote on a regular basis for various "alternative" (or "dwarf" -nanicos, according to contemporary Brazilian slang) papers and magazines, especially the satirical weekly O Pasquim and the daily Tribuna da Imprensa. Evading censorship, he wrote mostly about international affairs, and manifestly opposed US intervention in Vietnam, as well as supporting the PLO, flouting the official pro-American and pro-Israel sympathies of the military government in texts considered so uncharacteristically sober that they later produced a remark from Kucinski that "only then he became a real mentsch". In the wake of the late 1968 "coup inside the coup"—the takeover of the already existing military dictatorship by more radical generals—he was arrested four times, on the slimmest of pretexts.

After deciding to live abroad to escape the ever more stringent political repression in 1970s Brazil, Francis moved to the US, a move favoured by his previous upbringing in Columbia, his enduring Trotskyist sympathies (and therefore alienation towards the Stalinist Left of the time), and his actual American connections, such as his acquaintance with diplomat John Mowinckel. In late 1971, he moved to New York City as an international correspondent on a Ford Foundation fellowship. Once there, he assumed a position highly critical of the Richard Nixon administration, offering qualified support to the George McGovern candidacy in the 1972 US presidential election, assuming that McGovern's "naive reformism" offered a way out of the frozen consensus around Nixon – a consensus which he saw as a product of a conservative victory in a late 1960s "restrained civil war". Late in 1972, he published an essay in Portuguese that offered a continuous account of the said elections: Nixon vs. McGovern: as Duas Américas. Shortly afterwards, he married fellow journalist and international correspondent Sonia Nolasco Ferreira, who would later be acknowledged as a writer on her own right with her novels on Brazilian immigration to the US.

After 1976, Francis was employed again by a major Brazilian paper, as he began working exclusively for daily Folha de S.Paulo, then under the editorship of the Trotskyist cadre and famed editor Cláudio Abramo.

=== Fiction-writing and its repercussion ===
As a man of letters, Francis remained throughout his life committed to the modernist canon in literature, which he claimed to have received from Gertrude Stein: "things are precisely what they are. Rose is a rose is a rose is a rose. [This] has no need of adjectives, except as irony". In his view, what the modernist writer should strive at was historical relevance, by depicting in personal terms the fragmentary character of the social reality around him, described through the objective sensation felt, shunning any kind of commentary wont at offering a sense of coherence and totality. In Francis' words, in modern art, "it's the creator who imposes his untransferable imaging to the universe, with at most a distant relationship to observed reality". Therefore, what literature should strive at was "a curious stance – on purpose, to be sure – to expose things as they seem to us, suggesting in a very casual way what lies beneath". Although rejecting Social realism, Francis strived at socio-politic relevance in his choice of subject-matter, as expressed, for example, in his rejection of the "apogee of American petty-bourgeois Philistinism" he saw in John Updike's Rabbit novels, or the "constant fall into the anecdotal" he saw in contemporary Woody Allen's films.

Basing himself on these rules, during the late 1970s, Francis would publish the first two parts of an intended trilogy of social novels in which he tried, in a style Francis himself declares as reminiscent of James Joyce, but has very little in common to the style and genius of the Irish artist, to shun what he saw as the populist streak of Brazilian modern fiction, that is, the portrayal of the lives of the rural lower and/or higher classes typical of later Brazilian modernist authors such as Érico Veríssimo, Jorge Amado or Graciliano Ramos. Rejecting what he saw as the portrayal "of the ruling Bourgeoisie as an evil caricature", he chose to offer "the people" the opportunity "to know more about its masters", by describing life among the happy few in 1960s–1970s Rio ("the elite of the charming parochialism of Rio de Janeiro [fashionable boroughs], their parties and sensual pleasures")—a project reminiscent of Scott Fitzgerald. By the same token, he associated his embrace of modernist stylish conventions (juxtaposition, non-linear narration) – or, in his own words, the deliberate refusal of earlier formal stylistics – to the necessity of portraying an emerging urban Brazil.

The first novel, Cabeça de Papel (Paperhead, a pun with a Brazilian nursery rhyme), a mix between a memoir and spy thriller, was published in Brazil in 1977. In 1979, he published a sequel, Cabeça de Negro (also a pun, this time with the name of a kind of homemade firework called "black man's head"), which was intended both as a thriller and as one of the various 1970s memorial novels that chronicled the armed underground struggle against the Brazilian military dictatorship. Both novels achieved moderate sales success, but were met with critical failure. Brazilian scholars with both an academic and journalistic background criticised Francis' writing for sloppiness: the literary critic José Guilherme Merquior even said that he simply had shunned reading one of Francis' novels to the end for its plain want of literary qualities. Other critics, however, like the writer Silvano Santiago, maintained that Francis' apparent lack of stylish qualities simply meant that he, like many others, simply felt the imprint of the times: in the absence of open public debate, it was unavoidable that literature would assume a parajournalistic function aimed at a transposition of the real. According to the prominent Austro-Brazilian critic Otto Maria Carpeaux, what Francis' novels offered was information "about a fringe of Brazilian society that snorts lines and stays drunk" and "an out of focus look at a seaside [i.e. fashionable] swathe of our age". Francis replied to his critics' restrictions in his usually vitriolic fashion by calling them "smarties who adopt the blurbs of foreign books [as their own] in order to make themselves a career [...] the plague of university professors in Brazil is more serious than the Black Death in the Middle Ages"

Francis was also criticized for an alleged lack of depth in his political and cultural commentaries and confusion arising from his attempt at melding the Joycean stream of consciousness with the plot of a spy thriller: in the words of a paper critic for Folha de S.Paulo, Vinicius Torres Filho, for producing in his novels something like "a watered-down Graham Greene", expressing a Cold War obsession at displaying a supposedly intellectual sophistication by seeing political issues in terms of conspiracies and spies. The same critics also pointed to the patchy plot of Francis' novels and his shallow digressions – in which Francis showed what they considered a weakness for incessant quotes and untimely comment, which, despite their undeniable charm, showed an author who simply couldn't refrain from offering his erudition in a showcase to the prospective reader. This alleged self-centered character of his fictions made literary critic João Luiz Lafetá declare that Francis had intended to write about the anatomy of the Brazilian ruling class but had written only about his (dependent) position towards it as an intellectual. In a late, posthumous comment on the twin "Cabeça" novels, the writer Ricardo Lisias wrote that Francis' text was a mix of superficial geopolitics, culinary frivolity, creepy sexual commentaries - all spun together in "a kind of crazed speech, always in the same whirling, meaningless rhythm".

However, what these same critics acknowledged as the greatest achievement of the two novels was Francis's "stylistics of mockery" (retórica da esculhambação): his grammatically incorrect phrasing, polyglot vocabulary and confused mix between the erudite and the downright vulgar. In a pithy description, his was "a messy (avacalhada), aggressive rhetoric, in itself a critique of the pompous logorrhea and mystification [proper to Brazilian ruling elites]". In a late critique, the scholar João Manuel dos Santos Cunha would say that it was Francis' own logorrhea in these novels which functioned as a "rape" of journalistic language that made clear his forswearing of any pretense at objectivity in order to allow him to build "a dirty language for a dirty time".

Despite the Francis' avowed leftism at the time, the American literary scholar Malcolm Silvermann considered his tone to be already that of a nihilist: in the words this same critic, what every character in Francis' novels displayed – irrespective of political affiliation – was the same "careless erotico-politic debauchery, conspicuous consuming, belligerent use of obscenities and a general disdain for everyone". Such was an outward manifestation of a deeper process that affected Francis as well as other Brazilian Left intellectuals of the time: a general feeling of disenchantment that eventually found a solution in the most extreme aggression directed toward earlier ideals.

After the joint publication, in 1982, of two novellas under the title Filhas do Segundo Sexo ("Children of the Second Sex") – an attempt at tackling the issue of middle-class female emancipation and at the same time at plain language feuilleton – which was very ill-received by both critics and public, Francis stopped publishing fiction. Eleven years after his death, a new novel, left by Francis as a draft, was to be published after being edited by his widow: Carne Viva ("Open Wound"), where the author tried, again, to portray the lives of the wealthy and sophisticated in between a mythical 1960s Rio de Janeiro and an equally mythical French May—something that led critic Vinícius Torres Freire, in Folha de S.Paulo, to state that Francis had left only a memoir about the kitsch character of his usual snobbery.

== Post-dictatorship years: ideological shift and media celebrity (1979–97) ==
In 1980, Francis published a mostly political memoir upon turning 50, O afeto que se encerra ("The love enclosed" – a pun again, this time on a verse from the Brazilian Flag Anthem), in which he confirmed his Marxist beliefs. Shortly afterwards, however, he made a sharp and sudden turn from Trotskyism to conservative views. A gulf developed between him and the Left in the Brazilian intellectual and political scene during the demise of the military dictatorship and after, with Francis hurling insults from New York at various academics and politicians, and especially at the Workers' Party (PT), which in the post-dictatorship democracy quickly became the dominant Brazilian leftist party. According to one of his critics, he chose his targets carefully and used the most sordid adjectives, having as his choicest targets leaders of popular movements, the Left, specially the PT, but also writers and scholars, whom he smeared by name.

Francis' shift, rooted in what was a late 1970s general intellectual frustration with the Left, had nevertheless also personal reasons, on which later scholars differed: media scholar Kucinski talks about disenchantment and alienation; some fellow journalists propose plain objective interest, noting that Francis, in the early 1980s, had lobbied covertly in his column for private business interests. Others argue for vanity at hobnobbing with Establishment figures. He was criticised for having little understanding of the Brazilian realities, commenting on Brazil while living abroad – as well as feigning an acquaintance with the New York intellectual milieu which, according to the same critics, he lacked, and whose lack he always resented.

Other authors, however, such as historian Isabel Lustosa, have a different explanation: as a Left intellectual, Francis had already nurtured a deep-seated cultural elitism, as well as a loathing for the emergence of the so-called new social movements, a loathing expressed, for instance, in his lifelong misogyny. In one of the few times he was able to get in touch with a major figure of the New Yorker intellectual milieu, he did not refrain from making anti-feminist remarks that caused him to be snubbed by the American poet Adrienne Rich.

Around this elitist streak, possibly developed as a result of a superficial reading of Frankfurt School's authors critique of the Culture Industry, Francis developed his notion of leftism as, above all, a means to an end: the social modernization and political democratization of Brazilian society – which ultimately meant embracing mainstream American values and American culture. In Lustosa's words, Francis' opposition to an autarkic Brazilian cultural nationalism was such as to eventually decide him to be "rather the last in the Court than the first in the backwater". Even before the 1964 military coup, Francis had decided to support Goulart's government only to the extent that Goulart stood for a modernizing agenda, in which "the populist politico of yesterday became the historical agent of today". In short, Francis' leftism was but a tool for Westernization.

During the early 1980s, Francis had behaved condescendingly towards the then emerging Workers' Party leader Lula, whom he had described as a supporter of business-as-usual trade unionism, with whom "even Ronald Reagan would agree". In the late 1980s, however, he would develop suspicions regarding what he saw as the PT's increasing radicalism, which, associated to his usual misanthropy ("by my aristocratic calling I mean setting strict bounds to sympathies for my neighbors"), led him eventually to express a fear that the emergence of a grassroots, mass, trade-union-based and anti-intellectual Left, such as that which the Workers' Party represented, meant the risk that Brazil and the Brazilians could distance themselves from "our cultural heritage [sic] which is the Illuminist West, the USA, our North American peers in size, which since Franklin Roosevelt want us to be their South American partners". His increasing disgust with Brazilian society at large, fostered by the failure of the Left to prevent the 1964 military coup as well as his growing sense of alienation from Brazilian politics, also could have had a role at his ideological volteface. Even in the 1960s, commenting on a novel by his friend Carlos Heitor Cony, Francis had pondered on the incompatibility between the activity of the intellectuals and general Brazilian society. In a later commentary, he would reject even the mere idea of actual mass politics and write disparagingly about 1960s New Left protest culture: even when there are rallies and marches, "if you look closer, it's the usual suspects who make noises. The rest are simple bystanders".

In a way, Francis' political rightward shift was an emotional rejection of the backwardness which he came to identify with all things Brazilian ("the climate abominable, the culture a desert, the food excessive and wretched, the political environment unbearable"). Such an a priori rejection, as it was, needed not be very elaborate: in a 1994 interview, Francis offered as a reason for his shift a 1970s trip to the American Midwest, "the industrial center of the country" where he allegedly had seen "nothing to equal it, in the way of progress and workers' welfare".

These and similar views grounded opinions such as the one that was to be expressed, in one of Francis' obituaries, by his late political friend, financial tsar and former Minister of Planning of the Castelo Branco military administration Roberto Campos: in Campos' condescending view, Francis' columns were intellectually worthless, but made nevertheless good propaganda; they were "a weird bouquet of [...] economic guesswork" but nevertheless a good "boxing for ideas". Francis' views were actually very simple, consisting in an extreme variety of Marxist historicism-cum-Reaganian supply-side economics: in order to liberate the forces of production and develop Brazil, it was, in his view, necessary "to surrender the country to people who want and know how to make money – private capital". An essay published in 1985, O Brasil no Mundo, identifying Brazilian authoritarianism with an absence of Capitalism, expressed this ideological shift. In his last book, Trinta Anos Esta Noite (1994), a memoir published on the 30th anniversary of the 1964 coup, he would argue that a socialist transformation of Brazilian society at the time was not achievable, and that Brazil should develop into the American sphere of influence. Notwithstanding his jagged relationship with the various post-dictatorship Brazilian presidencies (specially those of Fernando Collor and Fernando Henrique Cardoso), the fact is that the later Francis' neoliberal commitment was never directed towards a particular government, but towards an ideal of government.

Such ideas would eventually express themselves in a kind of bigotry with ever more markedly racist overtones, directed against "Mediterranean peoples, blacks, poor folk of all hues, Northeastern Brazilians". This trend began with a 1988 column directed against the then Workers' Party candidate to the São Paulo mayorship Luiza Erundina, a female from rural Northeastern Brazil whom he described as a "beefy gentleman", a "hottie", and whose prospects of winning the election he described with a Joseph Conrad quote ("the horror, the horror"). This kind of abuse eventually procured Francis a doubtful fame, built around his various scandalous smears, such as when he expressed his desire to have the PT MP-cum-unionist, the Afro-Brazilian Vicentinho, "whipped as a slave". In another of his pithy statements, he stated that "the discovery [sic] of the clarinet by Mozart was a greater contribution than anything Africa gave us until today". When President Fernando Collor created a Ya̧nomamö Park in Brazil, he wrote that this was the gesture of someone who gave "land in abundance" to a people who "weren't even of use as slaves". In a 1990s column, he would write that "Brazilian political problems stemmed from the stranglehold of northeastern elites".

In the early 1990s, Francis argued that the effects on American university education have been grim. Stanford University abolished, or made optional, the course of Western civilization, because it would be a matter of dead, white and males. Nothing before 1900 has the least importance, says the primer of the political correctness. Ignorant generations of the glory of the Western culture, of Homer, Dante Alighieri, William Shakespeare, Voltaire, Molière, Jean Racine, Michelangelo, Benvenuto Cellini, were formed in these twenty years without knowledge of these people.

Another book banned is Moby Dick by American writer Herman Melville, which is one of the extraordinary experiences in literature. Do you know what are the politically incorrect demonstrations of Moby Dick? In the whaling ship, the Pequod, there are only men, no woman who harpooned the whales. And Moby Dick tells about a whale hunt, hunt them is a crime against the environment. Being in favor of the environment is politically correct.

=== TV celebrity (1979–97) ===
Because of this, Paulo Francis was attacked by many of his former associates, and the number of disputes in which he became involved heightened his fame as a controversial journalist. Many of these polemics became, in themselves, pop culture events, as with the show of mutual animosity between him and the popular composer Caetano Veloso. From 1979 on, he worked as a TV commentator for Rede Globo—something that was in itself a telling proof of his political shift, as he had, during the dictatorship, charged the Globo boss Roberto Marinho with manipulating information in order to have him banished from Brazil. He also sustained a heated dispute with the newspaper ombudsman of Folha de S.Paulo Caio Túlio Costa—mostly over Francis' repeated insulting of Lula as the PT's presidential candidate for the incoming 1989 elections. What Costa objected to was mostly Francis's description of Lula as "[an individual] named after an octopus and an [association football] Left winger, a half-illiterate with the discreet charm of the Proletariat". Costa also pointed to Francis' racism Francis left the Folha during early 1991 and began writing his column for the O Estado de S. Paulo. He also had his column syndicated and published in the Globo-owned newspaper, the Rio de Janeiro daily O Globo, among others.

In one of his later Folha columns, Francis offered support for then President-elect Fernando Collor, whom he described as "tall, comely and white – Western white. It's the image of Brazil with which I was raised". In another, late 1990 piece, he described an altercation between him and a black waiter at the Plaza Hotel Palm Court restaurant, concluding with the remark that "I thought about a whip. I'm thinking very much of whips lately [...] it's astonishing to have a nigger [crioulo] at the Palm Court, and a crude one to boot". As his posthumous editor remarks, "[Francis'] ensuing years were not to be very different from that".

Concentrating afterwards on his activities as a television commentator, Francis quickly became a pop culture phenomenon, playing the persona of the pundit always ready to offer a stinging comment in a basso voice—earning him various impersonators on Brazilian TV. This public persona, regarded by some as a caricature of himself, was often criticised as having a less-than-ideal regard for truth: according to an anecdote told by one of his friends, when Francis was still working for Folha de S.Paulo, one reporter, charged with revising his column, approached the then editor-in-chief of the paper, Boris Casoy, saying that "Francis' numbers do not check with truth", to which the editor – known for his rightist political stands – replied "Sonny, it's your numbers that must check with reality; Francis' numbers needn't". In his last years, Francis' activity as commentator centered on the cable TV weekly show Manhattan Connection, where he commented on the current issues, in what was described by a colleague as "three journalists striving uselessly at containing Francis' arrogant and overweening personality, allowing him eventually to have always the last word and to make wild guesses on everything".

== Final disputes and death ==
His style, "a permanent diarrhea of insults, an opera-like performance of a bomber in the service of a single cause- his own," provoked lasting grudges. Francis was sued repeatedly in Brazilian courts for libel, to no avail. In early 1996, he was attacked bitterly by the anthropologist and then senator Darcy Ribeiro, who, reacting to Francis' disparaging comments on a bill he had presented on the restructuring of Brazil's education system, called him a neogringo and charged him with lobbying for private universities' interests. In Ribeiro's words, Francis was well aware of the fact that what he offered as "news" was actually a task on behalf of interest groups. Late this year, an entire book was published listing and describing various cases of his supposed plagiarisms and abuses.

In early 1997, Francis attacked, on cable TV, on the management of Brazilian state-owned oil corporation Petrobras as dishonest. Francis also claimed that its directors had US$50 million stashed in a Swiss bank account. After Francis' statements, Petrobras' management sued him for libel in an American court, which was possible because the show was broadcast in the US to Brazilian cable TV subscribers. The libel suit seems to have added to Francis' poor health condition, which was also due to a lifelong lack of physical exercise, heavy drinking and drug addiction, and chronic depression. Soon after, he suffered a fatal heart attack and died in New York on February 4, 1997. He was buried in Rio de Janeiro, and was survived by his wife Sonia Nolasco, who at the time was already working for the United Nations Organization and after her husband's death would perform various humanitarian missions to East Timor and Haiti.

According to his personal friend, political columnist Élio Gaspari, Francis had approached then-senator José Serra, who supposedly asked President Fernando Henrique Cardoso to see that the directors of Petrobras drop the lawsuit against Francis. President Cardoso, however, chose not to take action.

== Legacy ==
Francis left a divided legacy, as his Leftist critics and Rightist admirers disagreed on the overall evaluation of his career. For the Left, his was a sad tale of the betrayal of the leftist culture of the 1950s, and of the 1960s Brazilian intelligentsia in which he was nurtured for the sake of success in the Cultural Industry. In a Berlin-held congress of scholars on Brazilian intellectuals, papers written on him by Kucinski and Lustosa were almost rejected "as his condition as an intellectual was regarded as doubtful". Some said that, even in his leftist phase, his elitism was already evident, especially in the way he used his supposed erudition as a commodity, for the sake of exerting an authoritarian influence on the cultural debate. Another scholar even coined the expression that, as an individual, Francis had left empty an informal "chair" for journalistic histrionics, for which various columnists competed, to the exclusion of serious journalism. Conversely, his conservative friends and admirers – as well as some of his remaining leftist friends – praised him heartily for his stylistic and satirical qualities, (in short, his public persona). They downplayed his more controversial statements and praised his clarity in admitting openly the demise of his earlier leftist ideals. Others friends and colleagues mourned his loss as the loss of a living memento from an already mythical 1950s and 1960s Rio de Janeiro.

== Selected works ==
- Opinião Pessoal (Cultura e Política) (essays, 1966)
- Certezas da Dúvida (essays, 1970)
- Nixon x McGovern – As Duas Américas (essay, 1972)
- Paulo Francis Nu e Cru (newspaper articles, 1976)
- Cabeça de Papel (novel, 1977)
- Paulo Francis – Uma Coletânea de Seus Melhores Textos Já Publicados (collection of columns, 1978)
- Cabeça de Negro (novel, 1979)
- O Afeto Que Se Encerra (memoir, 1980)
- Filhas do Segundo Sexo (novellas, 1982)
- O Brasil no Mundo (essay, 1985)
- Trinta Anos Esta Noite – 1964: O Que Vi e Vivi (essay, 1994)
- Waaal – O Dicionário da Corte de Paulo Francis (anthology of sayings, 1996)
- Carne Viva (novel, 2008)
- Diário da Corte (collection of Folha de S.Paulo columns, Nelson de Sá, org., 2012)
