= SS Carperby =

At least two steamships were named Carperby

- SS Carperby (1895), a British merchant ship in service 1895–1926
- SS Carperby (1928), a British merchant ship in service 1928–1942, when she was torpedoed and sunk
