= WBS =

WBS may refer to:

== Business ==
- WBS Television (WBS), Wavah Broadcasting System, a Kampala, East Africa television station
- Ward-Beck Systems, Canadian manufacturer of Audio and Video equipment
- Webster Bank (NYSE: WBS), a bank based out of Waterbury, Connecticut

== Education ==
- Warwick Business School, the largest academic department of the University of Warwick
- Wesley Biblical Seminary, a multi-denominational graduate school of theology
- West Bridgford School, a technology college
- Westminster Business School, one of the two business schools of the University of Westminster
- Willy Brandt Schule (disambiguation) may refer to schools in and outside of Germany
  - Willy-Brandt-Schule in Warsaw, Poland

== Medicine ==
- Beckwith-Wiedemann syndrome, or Wiedemann Beckwith Syndrome, a genetic disorder
- Williams-Beuren syndrome, a rare genetic disorder

== Sports ==
- WBS Penguins, the American Hockey League affiliate of the NHL's Pittsburgh Penguins.
- Williams-Brice Stadium, home of the South Carolina Gamecocks collegiate football team

== Technology ==
- Wafer backside coating, a procedure used in the electronic industry, mostly as part of the electroless nickel plating process
- WebChat Broadcasting System, a virtual community

== Media ==
- Wakayama Broadcasting System, a radio station in Wakayama Prefecture, Japan
- WBS Television, a defunct Ugandan television channel

== Others ==
- West by south (WbS), a compass point
- Work breakdown structure, a project management technique to organize a project into a numbered hierarchy
