= SS Westfalen =

Several steamships have borne the name Westfalen, after the Westphalia region in Germany:

- SS Westfalen (1894) was a 1,227-ton cargo ship launched on 20 March 1894, by Grangemouth Dockyard Company, Grangemouth, Scotland. Renamed Nestor in 1898 and Vladimir in 1912. Wrecked off Cape Serrat, French protectorate of Tunisia, on 31 March 1933.
- SS Westfalen (1900) was a 2,517 GRT-ton cargo ship completed in March 1901, by Neptun Werft in Rostock, Germany. Renamed Spessart, Kemi (1941), Olivia (1942), among nine Finnish vessels that were in U.S. ports and seized by United States Coast Guard at Boston then taken over by War Shipping Administration 27 December 1941 registered in Panama, renamed San Jorge then Isolator. Served in Southwest Pacific command's permanent local fleet 29 September 1943 – 1945 until returned to enter reserve fleet 24 November 1945 and re purchase by Finnish owners as Olivia 26 March 1947 under Executive Order 9822. Broken up as Olivia in 1957 at Rosyth, Scotland.
- SS Westfalen (1905) was a 5,098-ton cargo ship launched on 14 November 1905, by J.C. Tecklenborg in Geestemünde, Germany. Rebuilt as seaplane tender in 1933. Mined and sunk off Marstrand, Sweden, on 7 September 1944.
- SS Westfalen (1907) was a 385-ton passenger ship built in 1907 by Jos. L. Meyer in Papenburg, Germany. Converted to minesweeper in 1942 and renamed M.3802. Bombed and sunk by Royal Air Force aircraft off Saint-Nazaire, France, on 15 June 1944.
- SS Westfalen (1912) was built as the 170-ton minesweeper FM-29 in 1919, by Nobiskrug in Rendsburg, Germany. Converted to cargo ship and renamed Westfalen in 1925. Renamed Montijense in 1932. Wrecked at some point after 1958.
