= Saukko =

Saukko may refer to:

== People ==
- Alvar Saukko (1929–2007), Finnish civil servant and politician

== Ships ==
- Finnish submarine Saukko, in service 1930–52
- FV Saukko, a Finnish fishing vessel in service 1955-85
