= German ship Sylt =

The Kriegsmarine operated at least two requisitioned merchant ships named Sylt during the Second World War.

- MV Sylt, a tanker.
- SS Sylt, a coaster.

Both ships were seized in May 1945 at Trondheim, Norway. They became Empire Tegidad and Empire Continent respectively.
