= KBS (disambiguation) =

KBS typically refers to the Korean Broadcasting System.

KBS may also refer to:

== Places ==
- KBS Tuff, Kenyan archaeological site
- Kellogg Biological Station
- Kent Business School, University of Kent, UK

== Radio and television ==
- Kanlaon Broadcasting System (1960–1975), now Radio Philippines Network
- Kansas Broadcasting System, network of KWCH, Wichita, Kansas, US
- KBS World (TV channel), the television channel of the Korean Broadcasting System
- KBS World Radio, the international broadcaster of the Korean Broadcasting System
- Kyoto Broadcasting System, once Kinki Broadcasting System

== Transportation ==
- Kempegowda Bus Station
- Kankakee, Beaverville and Southern Railroad
- Kursbuchstrecke (timetabled routes), KBS codes given to scheduled railway routes in Germany

== Technology ==
- kB/s, kilobytes per second
- Knowledge-based system, an application of artificial intelligence to solve reasoning problems

== Other uses ==
- Kansas Bankers Surety Company
- Founders Brewing Kentucky Breakfast Stout
- King Baudouin Foundation (Dutch: Koning Boudewijnstichting)

== See also ==
- KB (disambiguation) for the singular of KBs
- KBS 1 (disambiguation)
- KBS 2 (disambiguation)
- KBS 3 (disambiguation)
