= Killabite =

Killabite may refer to:

- Killabite (Rob Jarvis song), song from the 2002 album On the Road (Miss Kittin album)
- Killabite (Killabite song), song from the 1999 Richie Hawtin album Decks, EFX & 909

== See also ==
- Killabyte, a fictional character from the children's CG animated TV show ReBoot
- Kilobyte (kB) 1000 bytes
- Kibibyte (KiB) 1024 bytes
- Kilobit (kb) 10^{3} bits
- Kibibit (Kib) 2^{10} bits
- Kilobyte (disambiguation)
- Killa (disambiguation)
- Bite (disambiguation)
