= KBS 2 =

KBS2 or variants may refer to:

- KBS2, a Korean TV station
- KBS Radio 2 (KBS Happy FM), a Korean radio station
- KBS 2FM, the former name of Korean radio station KBS Cool FM

== See also ==
- KBS (disambiguation)
- KBSS
