= BSI =

BSI may refer to:

== Businesses and organizations ==
- BSI Ltd, formerly Banca della Svizzera Italiana
- BSI Group or British Standards Institution
- The Baker Street Irregulars, a literary society devoted to Sherlock Holmes
- Bank Saderat Iran
- Bank Syariah Indonesia
- Bible Society of India
- Botanical Survey of India
- British Society for Immunology
- Federal Office for Information Security (German: Bundesamt für Sicherheit in der Informationstechnik)
- Bureau of Special Investigation, Myanmar

== Other uses ==
- BSI coupling, a railway coupling or coupler
- Back-illuminated sensor, also known as backside illumination (BSI) sensor, a type of digital image sensor
- Bloodstream infections
- Body substance isolation
- Balesin Airport, IATA code BSI
- Bangunan Sultan Iskandar, border checkpoint in Johor, Malaysia
- Hot R&B/Hip-Hop Songs, a Billboard chart with the shortcut "BSI"

== See also ==
- BS (disambiguation)
- BS1 (disambiguation)
- CBSI (disambiguation)
- WBSI (disambiguation)
- KBSI (disambiguation)
