= German weather ship WBS 3 Fritz Homann =

Ship built in 1930

History
- Name: Fritz Homann (1930–40); Uranus (1940); Fritz Homann (1940–55); Saukko (1955–85)
- Owner: Grundmann & Gröschel (1930–40); Kriegsmarine (1940–45); Grundmann & Gröschel (1945–55); Rymättylän Silli Oy (1955–67); Rymättylän Säilyke Oy (1967–69); Tauno Armas Saarni (1969–85)
- Port of registry: (Weimar Republic) Wesermünde, Germany (1930–35); (Nazi Germany) Wesermünde (1935–40); (Nazi Germany) Kriegsmarine (1940–45); Wesermunde, Allied-occupied Germany (1945–48); (Allied-occupied Germany) Bremerhaven (1948–49); Bremerhaven, West Germany (1949–55); Turku, Finland (1955–67); Naantali, Finland (1967–85)
- Builder: Deutsche Schiff- und Maschinenbau AG
- Yard number: 499
- Launched: 1930
- Completed: June 1930
- Identification: Code Letters KRNL (1930–34); Code Letters DFBH (1934–40); Fishing registration PG 395 (1930–40); WBS 3 (1940–41); WBS 4 (1941–45) or V 5717 (1942–45); Fishing registration BX 324 (1945–55); Code Letters DAEA (1949–55); Code Letters OFVR (1955–85); Fishing registration SUOMI 60 (1955–73); IMO number: 5314717 (1960s–1985); Fishing registration SF 6 (1973–85)
- Fate: Scrapped 1985

General characteristics
- Class & type: Fishing trawler (1930–40); Weather ship (WWII); Vorpostenboot (WWII); Buoy tender (1945); Fishing trawler (1945–85)
- Tonnage: 384 GRT, 149 NRT, 423 DWT (Fritz Homann); 399 GRT, 168 NRT, 559 DWT (Saukko)
- Length: 45.29 metres (148 ft 7 in)
- Beam: 7.67 metres (25 ft 2 in)
- Depth: 3.78 metres (12 ft 5 in)
- Installed power: Triple expansion steam engine, 64 nhp (1930–55); Diesel engine, 320 hp (1955–85)
- Propulsion: Single screw propeller
- Speed: 16 knots (30 km/h)
- Complement: 15, plus meteorologists (as weather ship)

Fritz Homann was a fishing trawler that was built in 1930 by Deutsche Schiff- und Maschinenbau AG, Wesermünde for Grundmann & Gröschel. She served with the Kriegsmarine during World War II as the weather ship WBS 3 Fritz Homann, WBS 4 Fritz Homann and the vorpostenboote Neptune and V 5717 Fritz Homann. She returned to her former rôle as a trawler post-war, and was sold to Finland in 1955. Renamed Saukko, she was scrapped in 1985.

== Description ==
Fritz Homann was 45.29 metres (148 ft 7 in) long, with a beam of 7.67 metres (25 ft 2 in). She had a depth of 3.78 metres (12 ft 5 in). She was powered by a 64 nhp triple expansion steam engine which was built by Deutsche Schiff- und Maschinenbau AG (Deschimag), Seebeck. The engine drove a single screw propeller, giving her a speed of 16 knots (30 km/h). She was assessed at 384 GRT, 149 NRT, 423 DWT.

== History ==
Fritz Homann was built as yard number 499 in 1930 by Deschimag, Wesermünde for Grundmann and Gröschel. She was completed in August 1930. Her port of registry was Wesermünde. The Code Letters KRNL, and fishing registration PG 395 were allocated. With the change in code letters in 1934, the letters DFBH were allocated.

In 1940, Fritz Homann was requisitioned by the Kriegsmarine. She was converted to a weather ship and was commissioned as WBS 3 Fritz Homann on 1 March. She had a complement of fifteen, plus her meteorologists. She sailed from Wilhelmshaven on 21 March for the Denmark Strait in support of the auxiliary cruiser Atlantis, which was to break out into the Atlantic Ocean. WBS 4 Hinrich Freese and WBS 5 Adolf Vinnen were also involved in this operation. She arrived at Bergen, Norway on 14 April. Fritz Homann was then reclassified as a vorpostenboot and was renamed Uranus. She sailed on 2 May for Holsenøy, where she took off nine soldiers. She then sailed to Rutledal, arriving on 10 May. She was then redesignated as a weather ship and renamed Fritz Homann.

On 17 June, Fritz Homann was ordered back to Iceland, but could not sail immediately as several defects needed to be rectified. She sailed from Bergen on 24 June. On 10 August she returned to Bergen. She sailed the next day for Kristiansand in convoy with M-boot V-1804, the tugboat Widder and the cargo ship Walküre. The convoy arrived the next day. Her crew were given leave and she would undergo repairs, which were done at Kiel, Germany during August and September. She sailed from Kristiansand on 13 September in convoy with the minesweepers M 1104, M 1105 and the tanker Irania, arriving at Bergen the next day. She sailed on 15 September to relieve Hinrich Freese. Fritz Homann then operated north of Jan Mayen, Norway, sailing to Trondheim at the end of that mission.

On 25 October she sailed for Jan Mayen in support of the cruiser Admiral Scheer, which was to transit the Denmark Strait. A Heinkel He 115 seaplane of Küstenfliegergruppe 506 crashed on landing on 29 October and a second was wrecked in a storm that night. The mission was cancelled. Adolf Vinnen and Hinrich Freese were also involved in this operation. Fritz Homann then sailed to an area north east of Iceland to provide weather reports to Admiral Scheer. She arrived at Bergen, Norway on 12 November. She sailed a week later to return to her previous position, returning to Trondheim on 21 December.

On 9 January 1941, she was redesignated WBS 4 Fritz Homann. She was laid up at Trondheim on 11 January. She sailed from Stavanger, Norway on 21 June in convoy with the minesweepers M 1102, M 1106 and the cargo ship Stockholm. Fritz Homann and WBS 1 Sachsen sailed on 26 September 1941 for West Spitsbergen, where they were to establish a weather station. They arrived on 15 October. The weather station was established by 29 October and the two vessels departed on 15 November.

On 1 January 1942, she was redesignated as a vorpostenboot – V 5717 Fritz Homann. She served with 57 Vorpostenflotille, operating in northern Norwegian waters. She was redesignated WBS 4 Fritz Homann in late May. She was operating from Trondheim until 20 July.

On 3 January 1943, Fritz Homann arrived at Kristiansand from Ålesund, Norway. She then sailed to Molde and Ålesund, returning on 8 January. At this period of time, she appears to have been serving variously as a weather ship and vorpostenboot. She escorted Lotte Blumenthal, Schillinghörn and Vaga from Kristiansund to Ålesund on 11 January, then Emsström from Molde to Kristiansund the next day. On 17 January, she escorted Alster, Island and Sebas from Ålesund to Kristiansund. On 19 January, Charlotte Cordes, Dessau, Levante, Heinrich Schmidt and Mendoza were escorted from Kristiansund to Ålesund by Fritz Homann and V 5703 Warthegau. She returned the next day escorting Birger and Tyriford. On 21 January, she escorted Haukefjell to Ålesund. On 30 January, she escorted Ostfriesland from Ålesund to Kristiansund.

On 23 March, she rejoined 57 Vorpostenbootflottille as V 5717 Fritz Homann. On 23 May, she escorted the hospital ship Alexander von Humboldt and cargo ship Jupiter from Rørvik, Norway to Norden, Germany. On 7 June, she escorted Alexander von Humboldt and the tanker Tiger south from Bodø, Norway. On 11 June, she escorted Hugo Stinnes north from Bodø, returning later that day to escort Inge Johanne and Ostermoor south from Bodø. On 18 June, she escorted the tanker Mariane north from Rørvik.

On 7 July, Fritz Homann escorted the tanker Tajfun southward from Bodø. On 11 July, she escorted the tankers Feiestein and Otto A. Müller from Rørvik to Bodø, continuing on to Sandnessjøen with Feiestein. On 18 July she escorted Blexen south from Bodø. On 21 July she escorted the tanker Sylt north from Bodø, and five days later performed the same service for Oldenburg. On 28 July, she escorted the seaplane tender Westfalen southward from Bodø. On 3 August, Fritz Homann escorted the tanker Inge Essberger northward from Rørvik. Three days later, she escorted Skramstad southward from Bodø. On 8 August, she escorted the tanker Inga Johanne and cargo ship Utsire northward from Rørvik.

On 13 January 1945, Fritz Homann was redesignated as a buoy tender, and was sent to Oslo, Norway. On 9 May she was in Trondheim. On 3 September she was returned to her former owners. The fishing registration BX 324 was allocated. On 1 February 1948, her port of registry was changed to Bremerhaven. The Code Letters DAEA were allocated in June 1949.

In January 1955, she was sold to Rymättylän Silli Oy, Turku, Finland and renamed Saukko. The code Letters OFVR and fishing registration SUOMI 60 were allocated. A new 320 hp diesel engine was fitted. She was assessed at 399 GRT, 168 NRT, 559 DWT. With the introduction of IMO Numbers in the mid-1960s, Saukko was allocated the IMO Number 5314717. In 1967, after fusion, Saukko became property of Rymättylän Säilyke Oy, Turku. Her port of registry was changed to Naantali on 16 October 1968. She was transferred to company owner Tauno Armas Saarni, Turku in 1969. The fishing registration SF 6 was allocated in 1973. Saukko served until 1985. She was scrapped by Nater Ltd Oy, Naantali in that year.
