= SS Dimitry Laptev =

1936 German-built cargo ship

History
- Name: Heinrich Schmidt (1936–45); Empire Constable (1945–46); Dimitry Laptev (1946–71)
- Owner: Flensburger Schiffsparten-Vereinigung AG (1946–45); Ministry of War Transport (1945); Ministry of Transport (1945–46); Soviet Government (1946–71)
- Operator: H Schmidt GmbH (1936–45); Shamrock Shipping Co Ltd (1945–46); Soviet Government (1946–71)
- Port of registry: (Nazi Germany) Flensburg (1936–45); (United Kingdom) London (1945–46); Soviet Union(1946–71)
- Builder: Flensburger Schiffsbau-Gesellschaft
- Launched: 1936
- Identification: Code Letters DDUS (1936–45); Code Letters GFWK (1945–46); United Kingdom Official Number 180697 (1945–46)
- Fate: Scrapped

General characteristics
- Type: Cargo ship
- Tonnage: 1,560 GRT; 889 NRT
- Length: 237 ft 2 in (72.29 m)
- Beam: 37 ft 6 in (11.43 m)
- Depth: 16 ft 0 in (4.88 m)
- Installed power: Triple expansion steam engine
- Propulsion: Screw propeller

Dimitry Laptev was a 1,560 GRT cargo ship that was built in 1936 as Heinrich Schmidt by Flensburger Schiffbau-Gesellschaft, Flensburg, Germany for German owners. She was seized by the Allies in May 1945, passed to the Ministry of War Transport (MoWT) and was renamed Empire Constable. In 1946, she was transferred to the Soviet Government and renamed Dimitry Laptev. She served until she was scrapped in 1971.

== Description ==
The ship was built in 1936 by Flensburger Schiffbau-Gesellschaft, Flensburg. The ship was 258 feet 8 inches (78.84 m) long, with a beam of 41 feet 3 inches (12.57 m) and a depth of 14 feet 4 inches (4.37 m). The ship had a GRT of 1,560 and a NRT of 889.

The ship was propelled by a triple expansion steam engine, which had cylinders of 17 11/16 inches (44.9 cm), 29 1/8 inches (74 cm) and 48 inches (120 cm) diameter by 34 7/16 inches (87.5 cm) stroke. The engine was built by Flensburger Schiffbau-Gesellschaft.

== History ==
Heinrich Schmidt was built for Flensburger Schiffsparten-Vereinigung AG. She was operated under the management of H Schmidt GmbH. Her port of registry was Flensburg and the Code Letters DHKV were allocated. Little is known of her war service; She was escorted from Kristiansund to Ålesund, Norway on 19 January 1943 by the vorpostenboot V 5717 Fritz Homann, along with Charlotte Cordes, Dessau, Levante, and Mendoza.

Heinrich Schmidt was seized by the Allies in May 1945 at Flensburg. Ownership passed to the MoWT and she was renamed Empire Constable. Her port of registry was changed to London. The Code Letters GFWK and United Kingdom Official Number 180697 were allocated. She was operated under the management of the Shamrock Shipping Co Ltd. In February 1946, Empire Constable was transferred to the Soviet Union under the Potsdam Agreement. She was renamed Dimitry Laptev. She served until 1971, when she was scrapped.
