= Cay (disambiguation) =

A cay is a small, low-elevation, sandy island on the surface of a coral reef.

Cay or CAY may also refer to:

== Places ==
- Cay (volcano), a volcano in the Andes mountains in Chile
- Çay, a town and district in Turkey
- Cayman Islands, by IOC country code
- Cayenne – Félix Eboué Airport, by IATA airport code

== Other uses ==
- Cay Holmberg (born 1933), Swedish Navy officer
- Cay (band), an English alternative rock band
- The Cay, a novel by Theodore Taylor
- Cayuga language, an Iroquoian language of Canada and the United States
- Central Alaskan Yup'ik language, an Eskimo language of Alaska, United States
- Chevra Ahavas Yisroel, a Jewish congregation in Brooklyn, New York, United States
- Histidine, by genetic code
