= KBS 1 =

KBS 1 may refer to:

- KBS1, a Korean TV station
- KBS Radio 1, a Korean radio station
- KBS 1FM, a former name of Korean radio station KBS Classic FM

== See also ==
- KBS (disambiguation)
- KBSI (disambiguation)
