= Kilo =

Kilo may refer to:

- kilo- (k-), a metric prefix denoting a factor of 10^{3}
- Kilogram (kg), a metric unit of mass

== Music ==
- Kilo, a funk/R&B band from Bloomington/Indianapolis/Indiana
- KILO, a Colorado radio station
- El Kilo, a 2005 album by the Cuban hip hop group Orishas

== People ==
- Jesse Kilo (born 2004), Finnish footballer
- Juho Kilo (born 2002), Finnish footballer
- Kilo Ali or Kilo (born 1973), American rapper
- Kilo Kish (born 1990), American singer/songwriter
- Michel Kilo (1940–2021), Syrian Christian writer and human rights activist
- Wiz Kilo (born 1984), Syrian Canadian hip hop and electronic artist

== Places ==
- Kilo, Dompu, a district in West Nusa Tenggara, Indonesia
- Kilo, Espoo, a district of Espoo, Finland
  - Kilo railway station, a commuter rail network in Kilo, Espoo, Finland
  - Kilonväylä or Kilo Highway, an alternative name of the Ring II beltway in Espoo, Finland

== Other ==
- Kilo-class submarine, the NATO reporting name for a type of Russian submarine
- The letter K in the NATO phonetic alphabet
- The 1,000 meter time trial in cycling.

Men's 1 km Time Trial, a cycling track time trial

== See also ==
- K (disambiguation); the letter "k" pronounced "kilo" in NATO-speak (phonetic alphabet)
- Klio (disambiguation)
- Kilobyte (disambiguation)
- Kilometre (km), a metric unit of length
