= BS1 =

BS1 or BS-1 may refer to:

- BS1 Records, a record label producing the artist TC
- BS-1 Tishina, a Russian silenced 30mm grenade launcher
- Glasflügel BS-1, a glider
- NHK BS1, a Japanese satellite television channel
- BS1, a center drill bit size
- BS1, a BS postcode area in Bristol, England
- BASIC Stamp 1, a microcontroller
- BS-I Bharat Stage emission standards in India

== See also ==
- BSI (disambiguation)
