= CBSI =

CBSI may refer to:

- CBSI-FM, Sept-Îles, Quebec, Canada; a French-language radio station
- CBS Interactive, a division of the American media corporation CBS.
- ConAmor Broadcasting Systems, Inc. (CBSI), former name of DCG Radio-TV Network
- Community Bank System, Inc. (CBSI), a U.S. national bank network
- Catholic Boy Scouts of Ireland (CBSI), Irish scouting organization
- Clan Buchanan Society International (CBSI) the international society for the Scottish Clan Buchanan
- Cellular Business Systems Inc. (CBSI) billing company founded by Arlene Harris

== See also ==
- CBS (disambiguation)
- BSI (disambiguation)
- WBSI (disambiguation)
- KBSI (disambiguation)
