= KBS 3 =

KBS 3 may refer to:

- KBS3 (KBS 3TV), Korean TV station
- KBS Radio 3 (KBS Happy FM), Korean radio station
- KBS 3FM, former name of the Korean radio station KBS Cool FM

== See also ==
- KBS-3, a technology for disposal of high-level radioactive waste
- KBS (disambiguation)
