= Willy Brandt Schule =

Willy Brandt Schule may refer to:

Schools in Germany:

- Willy-Brandt-Schule Kassel
- Willy-Brandt-Schule Lübeck-Schlutup
- Willy-Brandt-Schule Norderstedt

Schools outside of Germany:

- Willy-Brandt-Schule in Warsaw, Poland
