= German weather ship WBS 1 Hermann =

Ship built in 1929

History

Germany
- Name: J. F. Schröder (1929–33); Sachsen (1933–43)
- Owner: Deutsche Hochsee Fischerei Bremen-Cuxhaven AG (1929–
- Port of registry: (Weimar Republic) Cuxhaven, Germany (1929–35); (Nazi Germany) Cuxhaven (1935–40); (Nazi Germany) Kriegsmarine (1940–43)
- Builder: Schiffbau-Gesellschaft Unterweser
- Yard number: 235
- Launched: June 1929
- Completed: July 1929
- Commissioned: 18 September 1940
- Identification: Fishing registration HC 214 (1929–40); Code Letters RHJP (1929–34); Code Letters DICM (1934-40); WBS 1 (1940–43)
- Fate: Scuttled, 17 June 1943

General characteristics
- Type: Fishing trawler (1929–40); Weather ship (1940–43)
- Tonnage: 284 GRT, 106 NRT
- Length: 42.70 metres (140 ft 1 in)
- Beam: 7.42 metres (24 ft 4 in)
- Depth: 3.78 metres (12 ft 5 in)
- Installed power: Diesel engine, 183nhp
- Propulsion: Single screw propeller
- Complement: 15, plus 5 meteorologists (Kriegsmarine)

Hermann was a Kriegsmarine weather ship that was built in 1929 as the fishing trawler J. F. Schröder. She was renamed Sachsen in 1933 and requisitioned in 1940, serving as WBS 1 Sachsen. She was renamed Hermann in 1942, serving until scuttled off the coast of Greenland in June 1943.

== Description ==
The ship was 42.70 metres (140 ft 1 in) long, with a beam of 7.42 metres (24 ft 4 in). She had a depth of 3.78 metres (12 ft 5 in). The ship was powered by a six-cylinder four stroke single cycle, single action diesel engine which drove a single screw propeller. Rated at 183 nhp, it was built by Maschinenfabrik Augsburg-Nürnburg, Augsburg. She was assessed as 284 GRT, 106 NRT.

== History ==
J. F. Schröder was built in 1929 as yard number 235 by Schiffbau-Gesellschaft Unterweser AG, Wesermünde for the Deutsche Hochsee Fischerei Bremen-Cuxhaven AG. She was launched in June 1929, and completed the next month. Her port of registry was Cuxhaven and the Code Letters RHJP, and fishing registration HC 214 were allocated. In 1933, she was renamed Sachsen. With the change of Code Letters in 1934, Sachsen was allocated the letters DICM.

On 22 May 1940, Sachsen was requisitioned by the Kriegsmarine. She was converted to a weather ship and was commissioned on 18 September. She had a crew of fifteen, plus five meteorologists. From 18 September to 23 November, she was employed on a mission to the Denmark Strait. In the spring and summer of 1941, she operated off the Norwegian island of Jan Mayen. On 10 October 1941, Sachsen sailed from Tromsø, Norway with WBS 4 Fritz Homann for Jan Mayen, where an automatic weather station was to be established. This was completed on 29 October and the two ship departed from Jan Mayen on 15 November.

Sachsen was later renamed Hermann. On 22 August 1942 she sailed from Tromsø to operate off the east coast of Greenland, arriving at Shannon Island on 27 August. The ship was disguised in an attempt to make her look like sea ice. In the spring of 1943, the Germans were discovered by the Slædepatruljen Sirius, but they later managed to capture its leader, and ordered him to help them find a new site for a weather station. He took Kapitän Ritter to Scoresbysund, where Ritter was captured by the Allies and made a prisoner of war. Hermann was scuttled on 17 June 1943 in Hansa Bay. Her crew were evacuated by a Dornier Do 26 flying boat.
