= Killobyte =

1993 novel by Piers Anthony

- First edition
- Author: Piers Anthony
- Language: English
- Genre: Science fiction novel
- Publisher: Putnam Pub Group
- Publication date: 1993
- Publication place: United States
- Media type: Print (hardback & paperback)
- Pages: 304
- ISBN: 0-399-13781-5
- OCLC: 25873607
- Dewey Decimal: 813/.54 20
- LC Class: PS3551.N73 K5 1993

Killobyte is a 1993 novel by Piers Anthony. This book explores a virtual reality world in the context of the Internet.

== The game ==
Killobyte is a "second generation" virtual reality game that puts players into a three-dimensional, fully sensory environment. Users are hooked up to a machine that not only simulates a range of sensations, from pain to sex, but responds to brain signals to move a player's character. The only way to exit the game and return to the real world is by selecting that option from a menu that appears within the virtual world.

The game takes place in many different settings, as players face a series of increasing challenges and accumulate points. In the tradition of role-playing games, players get some choice over their characters' appearance and abilities, and they must use logic and ingenuity to overcome each obstacle, often involving riddles. When encountering another character, it is not always easy to tell whether the person is a fellow player or a part of the program.

As is implied by the name (a pun on the word kilobyte), the game enables users to kill or be killed. Violence is quite graphic. Players who die receive electric shocks and the feeling of being buried in a coffin, and each death is longer and more unpleasant than the last one.

== Plot summary ==
The novel cuts between Walter Toland, a former police officer, and Baal Curran, an angst-ridden teenage girl. Both are playing Killobyte from their own home, hooked to the network through a telephone modem. Walter notices Baal's name on a list and initially assumes she is a man. Indeed, each of them first poses as the other sex.

Walter is learning the game as he goes, having neglected to read the instruction manual. He narrowly survives attacks by gunslingers, snakes, and runaway vehicles. Each time he destroys an enemy, he receives a point, and a door to a new setting appears. Eventually he must solve a more complicated problem when he finds himself in a women's prison, evading execution and a possible mole.

In the meantime, Baal enters a fantasy setting in which a knight must rescue a princess from an evil sorcerer in a castle guarded by a dragon. She first goes through the adventure as the knight and fails. When she tries again, this time in the role of the princess, Walter has entered the setting as the sorcerer. He captures Baal under the ruse that he is the hero, but when she makes sexual advances at him, he tells her the truth, too honourable to take advantage of her even if it is only within a game.

They begin telling each other about their real lives. In his days as a cop, he had an affair with a battered woman he was protecting, and the jealous husband ran him down with a car, leaving him paralysed from the waist down. He still has sexual feelings but is unable to perform. Baal, a plain girl despite her voluptuous appearance in the game, has type I diabetes and is depressed from having recently broken up with her boyfriend, who couldn't handle her disease. She pursued the game as a way of flirting with suicide.

They discover that he may be capable of sex within the game, but they are interrupted by a hacker who has infiltrated the software. Calling himself Phreak, the hacker targets specific individuals and locks them in the game so that he can harass them. Walter receives an error message every time he attempts to return to the real world. Aided by his police training, he remains calm and talks to Phreak, even though he knows his real body is in danger of eventual dehydration.

Baal temporarily quits the game after agreeing to meet Walter later in the game's next section, where they would use signals to identify each other, since they would have a different appearance. After unsuccessfully trying to get the police involved, she contacts the game's company, who want Walter to stay in the game as bait so that they can capture Phreak, who has eluded authorities for years. They give Baal a patch that will lock Phreak in the game along with Walter, so that they can force him to give the code that will free Walter.

We learn that Phreak is a 15-year-old boy whose father was part of a snake handling sect and died of a rattlesnake bite. The mother eventually died, and Phreak is convinced that she was also killed by snakes, which he believes lurk in the shadows waiting to pounce on him. He lives in his aunt's house, secretly using his own telephone line to hack into games, but he avoids experiencing the games directly for fear of being traced, despite the temptations of online sex.

Baal reenters the game world. Unfortunately, the next section is especially violent and unpredictable, modelled after Beirut. She poses as an Israeli spy, he as a Druze, and after several dangerous adventures they find each other, but not before Phreak catches up with them. Baal successfully sets the patch on Phreak, locking him in the game, though he has now locked her inside as well. They all end up in a prison together, and Walter tries to force the information out of Phreak, while Baal makes motions to seduce him, but he resists their methods.

Walter bombs the prison, causing their virtual deaths (so that they will no longer be imprisoned when they reappear). Walter believes that if his character dies again, he will die for real, for the electric shocks are interfering with his pacemaker and causing heart palpitations. Baal, meanwhile, is in danger of insulin shock if she does not exit the game soon. Phreak is traumatised by the game's simulated death and is terrified of experiencing it again, but he will not volunteer that information to Walter, whom he decides to kill.

They all end up in a special section called Potpourri, which mixes elements of various other sections. Baal is able to track the approximate locations of Walter and Phreak. Walter and Baal decide they are in love and want to marry if they manage to survive their current ordeal and meet in the real world. They chase Phreak across Potpourri, evading various obstacles he places in their path. Baal goes into insulin shock and her game body becomes still. Walter finally corners Phreak on a train and threatens to encase him in a box with snakes. Phreak finally relents.

Baal wakes up in a hospital, recovering from the insulin shock. She tries calling Walter, whose number she has memorised, but she gets no answer. She has her ex-boyfriend drive her across the country, and it gives him a chance to assuage his guilty conscience as he is comforted that she has found love again. Phreak has manipulated police records so that there is a phony arrest warrant on Walter, but the friends he met in Killobyte show up and refute the charges. A small party is held where Walter and Baal meet face-to-face at last.

== Author's note ==
Anthony writes about the development of the novel and the research it required. He got the first germ of the idea in 1981, before virtual reality was invented. He was influenced by the page-turning qualities of Robert A. Heinlein's 1951 novel The Puppet Masters. He did considerable research into gaming and diabetes. His description of Baal's condition was based on several real-life cases he investigated. (Anthony himself has been diagnosed with Type II diabetes, though the diagnosis was later called into question, as some doctors believe he may instead have chronic fatigue syndrome.) Additionally, Phreak was formed as a composite of several real-life hackers. Because of the approaching deadline, he had an assistant do the research on Beirut. In 1991, he believed the technology described in the book would be created in the following decade.
