= Kongres Buruh Seluruh Indonesia =

Labor union in the Dutch East Indies

The Kongres Buruh Seluruh Indonesia (KBSI; transl. All-Indonesia Labour Congress) was a labor union centre in Indonesia. It was politically linked to the Socialist Party of Indonesia (PSI). KBSI was founded in 1952, in an attempt from the socialists to counter the influence of the PKI-led SOBSI trade union centre.

KBSI was banned in 1960.
