= Chevra Ahavas Yisroel =

Orthodox synagogue in Brooklyn, New York

- Hebrew: חברה אהבת ישראל
- Location in New York City

Religion
- Affiliation: Orthodox Judaism
- Rite: Chabad Hasidic
- Ecclesiastical or organizational status: Synagogue
- Leadership: Rabbi Moshe Gitler
- Status: Active

Location
- Location: 306 Albany Avenue, Crown Heights, Brooklyn, New York City, New York 11213
- Country: United States
- Interactive map of Chevra Ahavas Yisroel
- Coordinates: 40°40′12″N 73°56′23″W

Architecture
- Founder: Rabbi Chezzi Denebeim
- Established: 2011 (as a congregation)
- Completed: 2012

Website
- chevraahavasyisroel.org

Chevra Ahavas Yisroel (Hebrew: חברה אהבת ישראל), abbreviated as CAY, is an Orthodox Jewish congregation and synagogue located at 306 Albany Avenue, Crown Heights, in Brooklyn, New York City, New York, United States. The congregation is associated with the Chabad Hasidic movement.

== Activities ==
The synagogue was founded in 2011, and purchased a permanent synagogue building in 2012. Although the congregants are mostly members of the Chabad movement, services include litigurical styles similar to Carlebach minyanim. The congregation has garnered local attention for their popular programming.

== See also ==
- Chabad hipsters
- Carlebach movement
