= Petter Moen =

Norwegian resistance member (1901–1944)

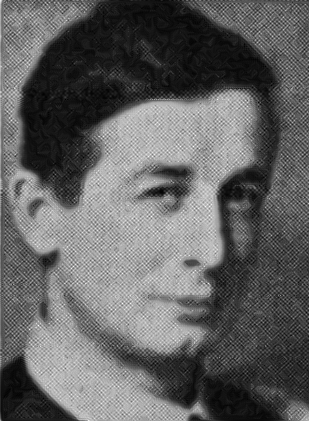
- Born: 14 February 1901; Drammen, Norway
- Died: 8 September 1944 (aged 43)
- Occupation: Actuary
- Known for: Resistance work during the Second world war; Diary from prison

Petter Moen (14 February 1901 – 8 September 1944) was a Norwegian resistance member later known for his diaries.

During the occupation of Norway by Nazi Germany he edited the underground newspaper London-Nytt. He was arrested in February 1944 when the German occupiers discovered several undercover newspapers. Moen spent time imprisoned at Møllergata 19, and he perished during transport to Germany with the ship SS Westfalen in September 1944. He is particularly known for his diary written with a pin on toilet paper during imprisonment. The manuscript was found after the war and published in 1949 as Petter Moens dagbok; it has been translated into several languages.
