= KBS Tuff =

The KBS Tuff (Kay Behrensmeyer Site Tuff) is an ash layer in East African Rift Valley sediments, derived from a volcanic eruption that occurred approximately 1.87 million years ago (Ma). The tuff is widely distributed geographically, and marks a significant transition between water flow and associated environmental conditions around Lake Turkana shortly after 2 Ma.

Between 1970 and 1985 the age of the tuff was the subject of intense academic dispute, with a variety of dates proposed by different geochemical and paleontological laboratories. This dispute came to be known as the KBS Tuff Controversy.

The KBS Tuff has been described as "the Turkana Basin's most celebrated tephrostratigraphic marker."

== Geography ==
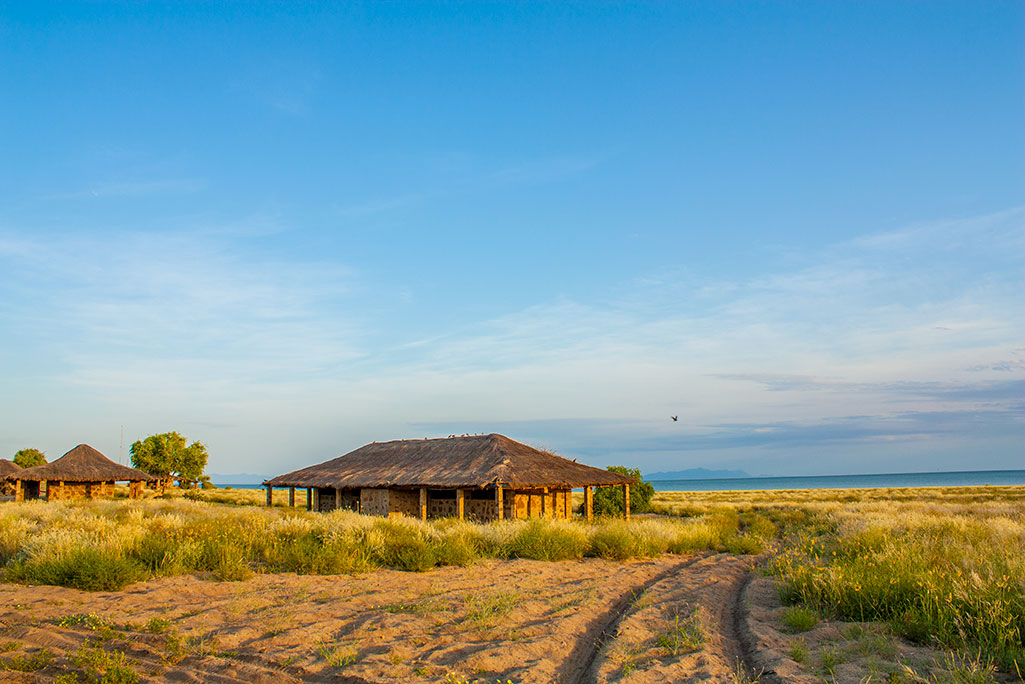
The National Museums of Kenya Koobi Fora offices and camp, Sibiloi National Park. The KBS Tuff is found in Koobi Fora.

The KBS Tuff was first reported and described by Kay Behrensmeyer (hence "KBS", Kay Behrensmeyer Site) in sediments that belong to Omo Group deposits in southern Ethiopia and northern Kenya. Within this larger group, the KBS has been found in the Shungura Formation in southern Ethiopia, In the Nachukui Formation on the west side of Lake Turkana in northern Kenya, and in the Koobi Fora Formation on the east side of Lake Turkana.

== Age and chronological sequence ==
Argon-argon dating has placed the age of the KBS Tuff at 1.869 ± 0.021 Ma. This age estimate is supported by independent fission track and K/Ar dating methods. KBS is situated above the older Kangaki (2.063 Ma), G-3 (2.188 Ma) and Kalochoro (2.331 Ma) tuffs, and below the younger Malbe (1.843 Ma), Morutot (1.607 Ma) and Lower Ileret (1.527 Ma) tuffs. In some locations tuffs with chemical compositions identical to the KBS tuff have been found in multiple, distinct layers, suggesting that deposition of the layers occurred at various times after eruption.

Within Omo group deposits, the KBS tuff separates distinct sedimentary members of the Nachukui and Foobi Fora formations. In the Nachukui (western) formation, KBS divides the older Kalochoro from the younger Kaitio member. In the Koobi Fora formation, it separates the older Burgi from the younger KBS member.

== Environmental context ==
The KBS Tuff marks a transition in the Turkana Basin from a stable to a fluctuating lake, partly filled by a river and delta system to the north and east of the basin.

== Associated hominin remains ==
In Koobi Fora, on the eastern side of Lake Turkana, a substantial number of hominin fossils have been found immediately below or above the KBS Tuff. A partial list is provided below, including a few specimens from north and west Lake Turkana.

=== Cranial remains below KBS ===
- KNM-ER 1470
- KNM-ER 1474
- KNM-ER 3735
- KNM-ER 2598
- KNM-ER 5879
- KNM-ER 1813
- KNM-ER 1800
- KNM-ER 3732
- KNM-ER 1501
- KNM-ER 3729
- KNM-ER 1502
- KNM-ER 1812
- KNM-ER 1801
- KNM-ER 1802
- KNM-ER 3731
- KNM-ER 3734
- KNM-ER 1482
- KNM-ER 1469
- KNM-ER 1803
- KNM-ER 1483
- KNM-ER 150
- L.894-1

=== Cranial remains at or above KBS ===
- KNM-ER 1590
- KNM-ER 1593
- KNM-ER 1805
- KNM-ER 407
- KNM-ER 814
- KNM-ER 1804
- KNM-ER 164
- KNM-ER 3733
- KNM-ER 1808
- KNM-ER 1821
- KNM-ER 734
- KNM-ER 807
- KNM-ER 406
- KNM-ER 732
- KNM-ER 730
- KNM-ER 1170
- KNM-WT 1740

== KBS Tuff controversy ==
The KBS Tuff was first dated in 1969, after Behrensmeyer discovered stone tools at Koobi Fora in the layer of the Tuff. Argon/Argon dating was performed by Frank Fitch at Birckbeck College in London and Jack Miller at the University of Cambridge in Cambridge, UK, who found a most likely age of 2.61 Ma for the KBS eruption. This find had important implications for the anthropological community because it provided a very old age for the tools found by Behresmeyer, and for associated crania including KNM-ER 1470, attributed to the genus Homo.

The date was called into question because efforts to replicate the findings produced KBS Tuff ages ranging from less than 1 to over 220 Ma. A study of pig molar anatomy from the site, by Vincent Maglio and Basil Cooke, suggested an age closer to 2 Ma or even less, using methods of biogeochronology. Similar investigation using antelope remains by Alan Gentry at the British Museum of Natural History also contradicted the Argon-Argon 2.6 Ma Tuff. Another problem that emerged was that the 2.6 Ma date for the KBS Tuff, provided by Fitch and Miller, made alignment of the Koobi Fora (east Turkana) geochronology with the Omo (north Turkana) geochronology impossible.

The conflict was resolved after geochemist Garniss Curtis and his student Thure E. Cerling conducted independent investigations of the age of the KBS Tuff using Argon-Argon and Potassium-Argon dating at the Berkeley Geochronology Laboratory. Curtis and Cerling found that the material dated by the Cambridge team actually belonged to two separate tuffs, which they estimated at 1.8 and 1.6 Ma. This date was confirmed by Potassium-Argon dating conducted by Ian McDougall, and later Fission-Track dating conducted by Andy Gleadow.

== See also ==
- Meave Leakey
- Richard Leakey
- Francis Harold Brown
- Thure E. Cerling
