= SS Laura (1908) =

Danish coastal trading vessel

History
- Name: Laura (1908–35); Sylt (1935–45); Empire Continent (1945–47); Master Nicholas (1947–52); Soussana II (1952–55); Georgios Matsas (1955); Sur (1955–65)
- Owner: A/S Dampskibs Selskap Vesterhavet (1908–17); unknown (1917–35); Wendenhof Reederei (1935–40); Kriegsmarine (1940–45); Ministry of War Transport (1945); Ministry of Transport (1945–47); A G Tsavliris Ltd (1947–52); N T Papadatos (1952–55); Loucas G Matsas (1955); Dabaco & Co (1955–65)
- Operator: J Lauritzen (1908–17); unknown (1917–35); Wendenhof Reederei (1935–40); Kriegsmarine (1940–45); G R Cuthbert Brown & Co Ltd (1945–47); A G Tsavliris Ltd (1947–52); N T Papadatos (1952–55); Loucas G Matsas (1955); Dabaco & Co (1955–65)
- Port of registry: (Denmark) Esbjerg (1908–17); (German Empire) Germany(1917–19); (Weimar Republic) Germany (1919–33); (Nazi Germany) Germany (1933–35); (Nazi Germany) Wismar (1935–40); (Nazi Germany) Kriegsmarine (1940–45); (United Kingdom) London (1945–52); Greece (1952–55); Panama City (1955–65)
- Builder: Kjøbenhavns Flydedok & Skibsværft
- Launched: 1908
- Identification: Code Letters NRDG (1908–17); Code Letters GJBN (1945–52); United Kingdom Official Number 180805 (1945–52)
- Fate: Scrapped

General characteristics
- Class & type: Coaster
- Tonnage: 842 GRT; 478 NRT; 1,135 DWT
- Length: 211 ft 2 in (64.36 m) (1908–45); 210 ft 0 in (64.01 m) (1945–65)
- Beam: 30 ft 7 in (9.32 m)
- Draught: 13 ft 1 in (3.99 m) (1908–45); 14 ft 0 in (4.27 m) (1945–65)
- Depth: 16 ft 2 in (4.93 m) (1908–45); 13 ft 4 in (4.06 m) (1945–65)
- Installed power: Triple expansion steam engine
- Propulsion: Screw propeller

Laura was an 842 GRT coaster that was built in 1908 by Kjøbenhavns Flydedok & Skibsværft, Copenhagen, Denmark for Danish owners. She was captured in 1917 by UC-79 and passed to German owners as a prize of war.

A sale in 1935 saw her renamed Sylt. She was seized by the Allies in May 1945, passed to the Ministry of War Transport (MoWT) and was renamed Empire Continent., then Master Nicholas following a sale in 1947. In 1952, she was sold to Greece and renamed Soussana II. A further sale in 1955 saw her renamed Georgios Matsas.

On 18 April 1955, she struck a reef off Muros, Spain and sank. Although Georgios Matsas was refloated two months later, she was declared a constructive total loss. Despite this, she was sold to Panama, repaired and renamed Sur, serving until 1965 when she was scrapped.

== Description ==
The ship was built in 1908 by Kjøbenhavns Flydedok & Skibsværft, Copenhagen.

As built, the ship was 211 feet 2 inches (64.36 m) long, with a beam of 30 feet 7 inches (9.32 m). She had a depth of 13 feet 1 inch (3.99 m) and a draught of 16 feet 2 inches (4.93 m). As built the ship had a GRT of 787. She was 736 NRT, 1,135 DWT.

The ship was propelled by a triple expansion steam engine, which had cylinders of 14 inches (36 cm), 23 inches (58 cm) and 37 inches (94 cm) diameter by 24 inches (61 cm) stroke. The engine was built by Kjøbenhavns Flydedok & Skibsværft.

== History ==
Laura was built for A/S Dampskibs Selskab Vesterhavet. She was operated under the management of J. Lauritzen A/S, Esbjerg. The Code Letters NRDG were allocated. On 28 April 1917 she was on a voyage from Gothenburg, Sweden to Hull, United Kingdom, when she was captured by the German U-boat UC-79 in the Skagerrak at 58°02′N 08°19′E and taken as a prize of war.

In 1935, Laura was sold to Wendenhof Reederei GmbH, Wismar and was renamed Sylt. In 1940, the ship was requisitioned by the Kriegsmarine. On 21 July 1943, she sailed from Bodø, Norway under escort from the vorpostenboot V 5717 Fritz Homann for a port to the north. In May 1945, Sylt was seized by the Allies at Trondheim, Norway. She was passed to the MoWT and renamed Empire Continent. Her port of registry was changed to London. The Code Letters GQBN and United Kingdom Official Number 180805 were allocated. She was placed under the management of G F Cuthbert Brown & Co Ltd. Empire Continent was recorded as 210 feet 0 inches (64.01 m) long, with a beam of 30 feet 7 inches (9.32 m), a depth of 13 feet 4 inches (4.06 m) and a draught of approximately 14 feet 0 inches (4.27 m).

In 1947, Empire Continent was sold to A G Tsavliris Ltd, London and was renamed Master Nicolas. In 1952, she was sold to N T Papadatos, Greece and was renamed Soussana II. In 1955, she was sold to Loucas G Matsas, Piraeus, and renamed Georgios Matsas. On 18 April 1955, she struck rocks off Muros, Spain and subsequently sank. The ship was refloated on 17 June but was declared to be a constructive total loss. Georgios Matsas was sold and repaired. She was then sold to Dabaco & Co, Panama and renamed Sur, serving until she was scrapped in Santander, Spain in August 1965.
