= K band =

K band may refer to:

- K band (IEEE), a radio frequency band from 18 to 27 GHz
- K band (infrared), an atmospheric transmission window centred on 2.2 μm
- K band (NATO), a radio frequency band from 20 to 40 GHz

== See also ==
- K_{a} band, a radio frequency band from 26.5 to 40 GHz
- K_{u} band, a radio frequency band from 12 to 18 GHz
