= Willy Brandt School (Warsaw) =

Coordinates: 52.1576°N 21.0692°E

Willy-Brandt-Schule
- Polsko-Niemiecka Szkoła Spotkań i Dialogu im. Willy’ego Brandta w Warszawie
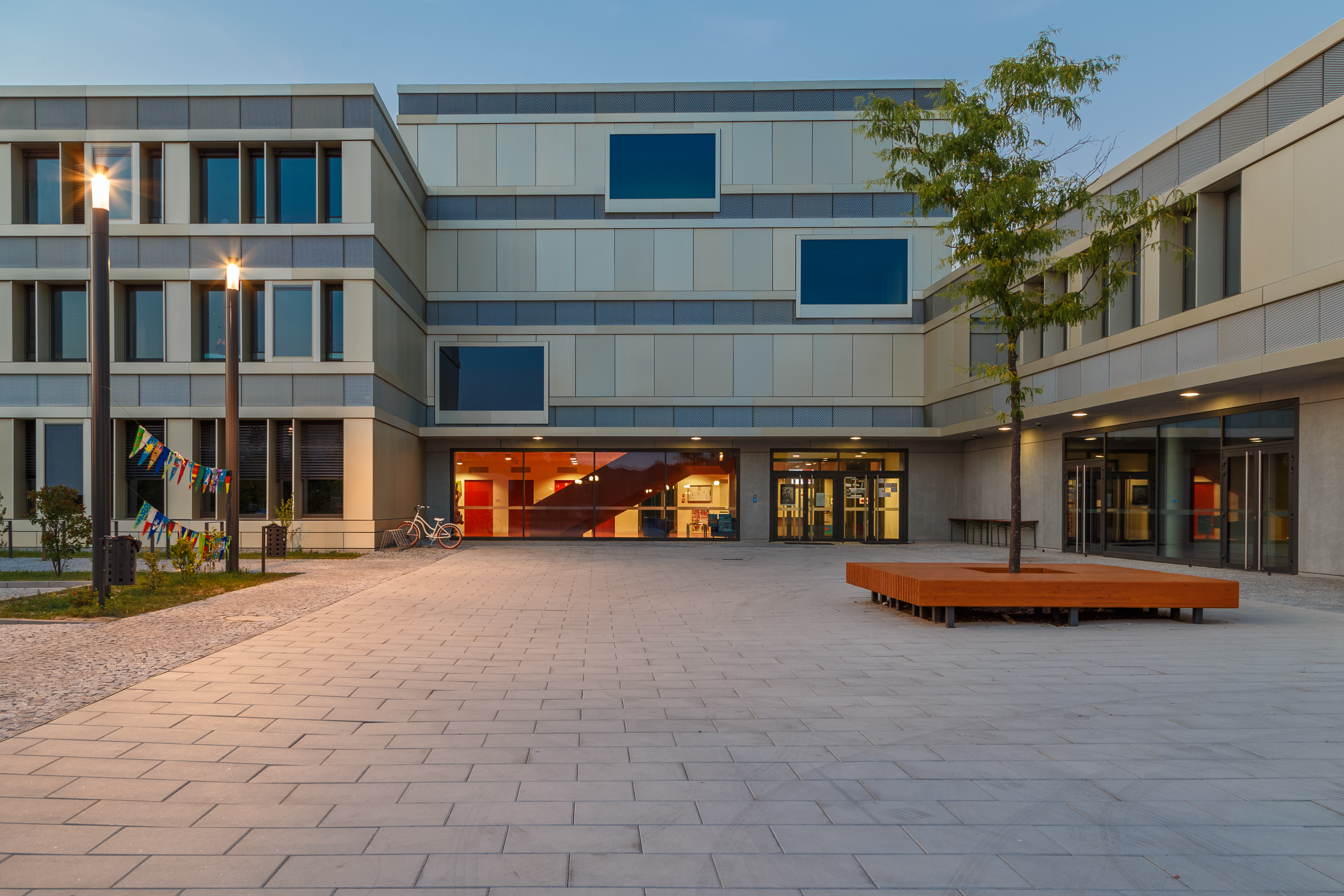
- Main campus

Location
- Main campus (grades 1-12): ul. Św. Urszuli Ledóchowskiej 3 02-972 Warszawa; Kindergarten: ul. Chłapowskiego 1 02-787 Warszawa; Warsaw; Poland

Information
- Type: German international school
- Website: wbs.pl

Deutsch-Polnische Begegnungsschule! „Willy-Brandt-Schule“ in Warschau (WBS, Polish: Polsko-Niemiecka Szkoła Spotkań i Dialogu im. Willy’ego Brandta w Warszawie) is a German international school with a 1-12 campus and a Kindergarten campus in Warsaw, Poland. It serves Grundschule (primary school) through Sekundarstufe II (senior high school or secondary school level II).

Campuses in Warsaw

== See also ==
- German minority in Poland
