= SS Westfalen (1905) =

1905 steamship

Coordinates: 57.7797°N 11.4561°E

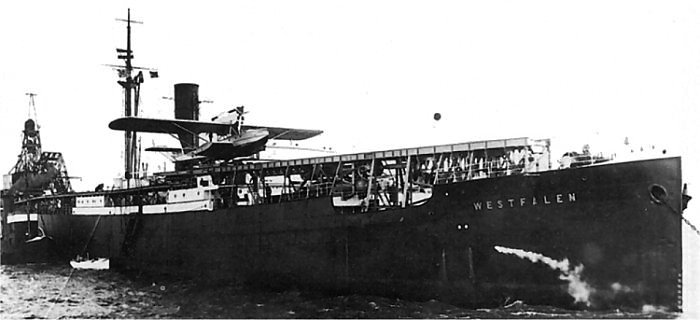
- Westfalen in 1933

History

Nazi Germany
- Name: SS Westfalen
- Namesake: The Province of Westphalia in Germany
- Builder: Joh. C. Tecklenborg, Geestemünde, Germany
- Yard number: 208
- Launched: 14 November 1905
- Fate: Sunk, probably by naval mine, on 7 September 1944

General characteristics
- Type: Steamship
- Tonnage: 5,098 GRT; 10,700 DWT
- Length: 124.8 m (409 ft 5 in) o/a
- Beam: 16.06 m (52 ft 8 in)
- Draught: 8.52 m (27 ft 11 in)
- Propulsion: 1 × 3,000 hp (2,237 kW) quadruple expansion steam engine; 4 boilers; 1 screw
- Speed: 11.5 knots (21.3 km/h; 13.2 mph)
- Complement: 54
- Armament: 2 × 20 mm AA guns (wartime)
- Aircraft carried: 1 × Dornier Wal or Do 18
- Aviation facilities: Crane and catapult for flying boats

SS Westfalen was a German ship launched on 14 November 1905 at Joh. C. Tecklenborg in Geestemünde (today Bremerhaven).

In the early 1930s Westfalen was converted into a seaplane tender to serve as a weather reporting and refueling station for Dornier Wal flying boats of Deutsche Luft Hansa carrying mail across the Atlantic between Europe and South America. The conversion of the Westfalen consisted of a large retractable stern mounted canvas drag apron for the flying boat to taxi on (i.e. for use in heavy seas and so the ship did not have to come to dead stop), cranes to lift the flying boats out of the water to be refueled and serviced, and a large compressed air catapult for launching the aircraft. When in operation, Westfalen cruised 900 miles in the middle of the South Atlantic between Bathhurst, Gambia (now Banjul) and Pernambuco, Brazil. The first test trans-Atlantic flights by Lufthansa Wals began in 1933 and the first commercial mail flights in 1934.

== World War II ==
During World War II, the ship was used for transport between Germany and German-occupied Norway. On 28 July 1943, Westfalen sailed from Bodø under escort of the Vorpostenboot V 5717 Fritz Homann for a port to the south. On 7 September 1944 the ship sank off Marstrand, after hitting a naval mine. Seventy-eight people aboard survived, but most of the locked-up Norwegian prisoners-of-war were casualties, including Petter Moen, Reidar Olaf Østlid and Sverre Lid. SS-Sturmscharführer Wilhelm Heinze also died.

== Bibliography ==
- Caruana, Joseph; Grobmeier, Alvin H.; Layman, R. D. & Truebe, Carl E. (1990). "Question 33/89". Warship International. XXVI (4): 417–420. ISSN 0043-0374.
