= Bernardo Kucinski =

Brazilian journalist and political scientist

- Born: 1937 (age 88–89); São Paulo, Brazil
- Education: Ph.D., Communication Sciences
- Alma mater: University of São Paulo
- Occupations: Journalist, professor, political advisor
- Writing career
- Language: Portuguese, English, Hebrew
- Genres: Essay, Journalism, Novel
- Notable awards: Jabuti Prize 1997

Bernardo Kucinski (born 1937, in São Paulo) is a Brazilian journalist and political scientist, professor at the University of São Paulo, and collaborator with Brazil's Workers' Party. He served as an advisor to the President of the Republic during the first term of Luiz Inácio Lula da Silva.

== Education ==
Kucinski graduated in physics at the University of São Paulo (USP) between 1967 and 1968. He returned in 1986 and joined the staff of the USP School of Communications and Arts. In 1991, he earned a Ph.D. in Communication Sciences from the University of São Paulo, with a thesis on alternative media in Brazil during the period, 1964–1980.

== Career ==
=== Journalist and publisher ===
Bernardo Kucinski is one of the most experienced and respected journalists in the current Brazilian scene. Although he graduated in physics, he entered journalism with the encouragement of Raimundo Pereira, a friend. By force of circumstances (in this case, the military regime that governed the country), he moved to England. In London, between 1971 and 1974, Kucinski was a producer and host of the BBC, and a correspondent of the journal Opinião first and after Gazeta Mercantil, dedicated to deepening their training in economics.

Returning to Brazil in 1974, Kucinski participated in the founding of alternative newspapers including Em Movimento and Tempo (which was the first publisher in 1977). Thereafter, he worked as editor of Gazeta Mercantil and was a correspondent for The Guardian, Euromoney, and Latin America Political Report. He also contributed to the science magazine, Ciência Hoje.

=== Academic ===
In 1986 he joined the staff of the University of São Paulo as a professor in the School of Communications and Arts. In 1991, he presented his doctoral thesis, Revolutionary Journalists.

=== Political advisor ===
In 2002, with the victory of the candidate of the Workers Party, Luiz Inácio Lula da Silva, Kucinski became a special advisor to the Ministry of Social Communication of the Presidency. He left this employment in 2006.

== Awards ==
- Kucinski was awarded the Jabuti Prize for Literature in 1997 in Economics, Management, Business and Law, for his book Economic Journalism (1996), a result of his thesis for faculty and postdoctoral held in London.
- In 2014, the German edition of his novel K was a finalist for International Literature Award - Haus der Kulturen der Welt.
- In 2015, K was shortlisted for the International Dublin Literary Award.

== Works ==
- Pau de Arara, La Violence Militaire au Brezil. França: Cahiers Libres, 1971.
- Fome de Lucros. São Paulo: Brasiliense, 1977.
- Brazil: state and struggle. London: Latin America Bureau, 1982.
- A ditadura da divida. São Paulo: Brasiliense, 1987.
- The debt squads. London: Zed Books Ltd, 1988.
- Jornalistas e Revolucionarios. São Paulo: Edusp, 1991.
- O que são Multinacionais. São Paulo, 1991.
- Brazil – Carnival of the Oppressed. London: Latina American Bureau, 1995. ISBN 9780906156995
- Jornalismo econômico. São Paulo: Edusp, 1996.
- A síndrome da antena parabolica. São Paulo: Editora Fundação Perseu Abramo, 1998.
- Cartas acidas da Campanha do Lula de 1998. São Paulo: Atelie Editorial, 2000.
- Lula and the workers party in Brazil. London: Latin America Bureau, 2003.
- Jornalismo na era virtual. São Paulo: UNESP, 2005.
- K. São Paulo: Expressão Popular, 2011.
- K, tr. Sue Branford. Illustrations by Enio Squeff. London: Latin America Bureau, 2013. ISBN 9781899365777
