= SS Jupiter =

History
- Name: Carperby (1895–1936); Jupiter (1936–49)
- Owner: R. Ropner & Co. (1895–1916); Sir R. Ropner & Co. Ltd. (1916–1919); Ropner Shipping Co. Ltd. (1919–26); Rederei A/B Ins (1926–39); Kriegsmarine (1939–45); Deutsches Hydrographisches Institut (1945–49)
- Operator: R. Ropner & Co. (1895–1916); Sir R. Ropner & Co. Ltd. (1916–1919); Ropner Shipping Co. Ltd. (1919–26); C. Abrahamsen (1926–40); Kriegsmarine (1940–45); Deutsches Hydrographisches Institut (1945–49)
- Port of registry: (United Kingdom of Great Britain and Ireland) Stockton-on-Tees, United Kingdom (1895–1926); Stockholm, Sweden (1926–39); Kriegsmarine (1939–45); Allied-occupied Germany (1945–49)
- Builder: Ropner & Sons
- Yard number: 301
- Launched: 25 January 1895
- Completed: February 1895
- Identification: United Kingdom Official Number 99724 (1895–1926); Code Letters NRGS (1895–1926); Code Letters KDGQ (1926–34); Code Letters SDPA (1934–39); Schiff 1 (1939–45)
- Fate: Scrapped

General characteristics
- Class & type: Cargo ship (1895–1939); Accommodation ship (1940–49)
- Tonnage: 2,170 GRT, 1,357 NRT
- Length: 275 feet 1 inch (83.85 m)
- Beam: 39 feet 5 inches (12.01 m)
- Draught: 19 feet 0 inches (5.79 m)
- Depth: 15 feet 9 inches (4.80 m)
- Installed power: Triple expansion steam engine, 187 nhp
- Propulsion: Screw propeller
- Notes: Fitted with four steam winches and two donkey engines.

Jupiter was a cargo ship that was built as Carperby in 1895 by and for Ropner's. She was sold in 1926 to Sweden and renamed Jupiter. She was captured by the Kriegsmarine during World War II and was designated Schiff 1. She survived the war and was scrapped in 1949.

== Description ==
The ship was 275 feet 1 inch (83.85 m) long, with a beam of 39 feet 5 inches (12.01 m). She had a depth of 15 feet 9 inches (4.80 m) and a draught of 19 feet 0 inches (5.79 m).

She was powered by a triple expansion steam engine, which had cylinders of 21 inches (53 cm), 34 inches (86 cm) and 56 inches (140 cm) diameter by 36 inches (91 cm) stroke. The engine was built by Blair & Co. Ltd, Stockton-on-Tees. It was rated at 187 nhp and drove a screw propeller. Steam was supplied at 160 pounds per square inch (1,100 kPa) by two boilers. Two donkey engines drove four steam winches.

== History ==
Carperby was built as yard number 301 by Ropner & Sons, Stockton-on-Tees for R. Ropner & Co, West Hartlepool. She was launched on 25 January 1895, the christening ceremony being performed by Miss Nancy Walker of Greatham. She was completed in February. Her port of registry was Stockton-on-Tees. The Code Letters NRGS and United Kingdom Official Number 99724 was allocated.

In 1916, her owners were renamed Sir R. Ropner & Co. Ltd. On 13 February 1918, Carperby collided with Svenska Lloyd's Italia in the North Sea 60 nautical miles (110 km) north east of Peterhead, Aberdeenshire. Italia sank. Svenska Lloyd claimed £8,405 5s 7d in compensation for the loss of their ship. The company became the Ropner Shipping Co. Ltd. in 1919. In 1926, Carperby was sold to the Rederi A/B Iris, Stockholm and was renamed Jupiter. She was operated under the management of C. Abrahamsen. The Code Letters KDGQ were allocated. In 1934, her Code Letters were changed to SDPA.

In December 1936, Jupiter was damaged in British waters. Following temporary repairs, she was taken in to Greenhithe, Kent. On 23 October 1939, Jupiter was captured by the Kriegsmarine in the North Sea 57°55′N 6°42′E) whilst on a voyage from Karlskrona to Rochester, Kent and London, United Kingdom. She was designated "Schiff 1". In December 1939, it was proposed to convert her to a minelayer, but she was commissioned as an accommodation ship in January 1940. She was allocated to 6 Vorpostengruppe and moored at Hamburg. In December 1945, she was passed to the Deutsches Hydrographisches Institut, still serving as an accommodation ship. She arrived at Stockton-on-Tees for scrapping on 1 September 1949.
