= KB =

KB, kB or kb may stand for:

== Businesses and organizations ==
=== Banks ===
- KB Kookmin Bank, South Korea
- Kaupthing Bank, Iceland
- Komerční banka, Czech Republic
- Kasikornbank, Thailand
- Karafarin Bank, Iran

=== Libraries ===
- National Library of Sweden (Swedish: Kungliga biblioteket)
- National Library of the Netherlands (Dutch: Koninklijke Bibliotheek)

=== Sport ===
- Kalix BF, a Swedish bandy club
- Kjøbenhavns Boldklub, a sports club, Copenhagen, Denmark

=== Other businesses and organizations ===
- KB Home, a US house builder
- KB Lager, Australia
- KB Toys, US
- K&B, a New Orleans, Louisiana, US drugstore
- Druk Air (IATA code: KB), Bhutan airline
- KB Financial Group (NYSE symbol)

== Entertainment ==
- Kick Buttowski, an American animated series and titular character

== People ==
- Kevin Bartlett (Australian rules footballer) (born 1947)
- KB (rapper) (born 1988), Kevin Elijah Burgess
- KB Killa Beats (born 1983), Zambian record producer
- Kobe Bryant (1978–2020), American basketball player
- Kyle Busch (1985–2026), American stock car driver

== Places ==
- King's Buildings, a University of Edinburgh campus
- Kota Bharu, a city in Kelantan, Malaysia
- Kuala Belait, a town in Brunei
- West Kalimantan (vehicle registration prefix KB)

== Science and technology ==
=== Chemistry ===
- Base dissociation constant K_{b}
- Ebullioscopic constant K_{b}, relating molality to boiling point elevation
- Kauri-butanol value Kb, a measure of solvent performance

=== Computing ===
- Kilobit (kb), 1,000 bits
- Kilobyte (kB), 1,000 bytes
- Knowledge base
  - Microsoft Knowledge Base ID prefix

=== Vehicles ===
- KB series, International Harvester trucks
- Isuzu Faster or KB, a pickup truck
  - Isuzu D-Max or KB, a pickup truck
- NZR K^{B} class, a New Zealand steam locomotive

=== Other uses in science and technology ===
- Boltzmann constant, k or k_{B}, in physics
- Kilo-base pair (kb or kbp), length of D/RNA molecule

== Other uses ==
- Knowledge Bowl, a quiz competition
- Former Knight Companion of the Order of the Bath
- WWKB, or KB Radio 1520
- A slang name for marijuana
