= K-factor =

K-factor or K factor may refer to:

== Engineering and technology ==
- K-factor (aeronautics), the number of pulses expected for every one volumetric unit of fluid passing through a given flow meter
- K-factor (centrifugation), relative pelleting efficiency of a given centrifuge rotor
- K factor (crude oil refining), a system for classifying crude oil
- K-factor (electrical engineering), a measurement of how well a power transformer can handle harmonic distortion
- K-factor (fire protection), formula used to calculate the discharge rate from a fire system nozzle
- K-factor (metallurgy), formulae used to calculate the bending capacity of sheet metal
- K factor (traffic engineering), the proportion of annual average daily traffic occurring in an hour

== Mathematics and statistics ==
- K-factor (actuarial), the ratio of the value of deferrable expenses to the value of estimated gross profits
- k-factor (graph theory), a spanning k-regular subgraph in graph theory

== Telecommunications ==
- K-factor, the circular segment of earth profile that blocks off long-distance communications in line-of-sight propagation

== Other uses ==
- K-factor (Elo rating system), a constant used in Elo rating system
- K-factor (marketing), the growth rate of websites, apps, or a customer base
- The K Factor, a fictional TV show within Harry Hill's TV Burp
- Bondi k-factor, the "k" in Bondi k-calculus

== See also ==
- K (disambiguation)
- K-value (disambiguation)
