= DHV =

DHV or dhv can refer to:

- Design Hourly Volume, an aspect of the K factor (traffic engineering)
- DHL Aviation, a South African airline
- Drehu language, a language spoken in New Caledonia, by ISO 639 code
- Dry-herb vaporizer, a type of vaporizer used to consume raw cannabis
- Duck hepatitis virus, a virus that attacks ducklings
- German Hemp Association, owned by Georg Wurth
- German National Association of Commercial Employees
- Hung Vuong University of Ho Chi Minh City (Trường Đại học Hùng Vương TP.HCM), a university in Vietnam

== See also ==
- Royal HaskoningDHV, a Dutch engineering firm
- DHV Speyer, a graduate school in Speyer, Germany
