= K-value =

K-value or k value may refer to:

- Thermal conductivity
- The force constant of a spring, see Hooke's law
- Vapor–liquid equilibrium, the ratio of vapor concentration to liquid concentration at equilibrium
- The relative permittivity, κ
- a statistical value used in the Elo rating system
- analysis provides a methodology for studying different factors that affect the size of a biological population.
- K value (viscosity), is an empirical parameter closely related to intrinsic viscosity, often defined in slightly different ways in different industries to express viscosity based estimate of statistical molecular mass of polymeric material used particularly for PVC. The most commonly used K value in Europe is the Fikentscher K value (referenced in DIN EN ISO 1628-1) obtained by dilute solution viscometry and solving Fikentscher equation.
- K_{Ic} or linear-elastic plane-strain fracture toughness of materials
- rate of change of curvature, used to assess and design vertical alignment of road and rail crests and dips
- The K value, also called the bending limit, of a cyclotron is the ratio between achievable energy and the charge-to-mass ratio according to $\frac{E_k}{A} \equiv K \left(\frac{Z}{A}\right)^2$, where $E_k$ is the kinetic energy of the particle, $A$ the atomic mass number and $Z$ the charge.
- Freshness Quality Index for assessing fish quality. It represents the ratio between the sum of inosine and hypoxanthine to the sum of all other products of ATP degradation.

== See also ==
- K (disambiguation)
- K-factor (disambiguation)
