= K-factor (electrical engineering) =

Measure of a transformer's ability to withstand harmonic distortion

In electrical engineering, the K-factor of a power transformer is a measure of how well it can handle harmonic distortion. Transformers which are designed to handle harmonic distortion are referred to as K-rated transformers.

== Harmonics ==
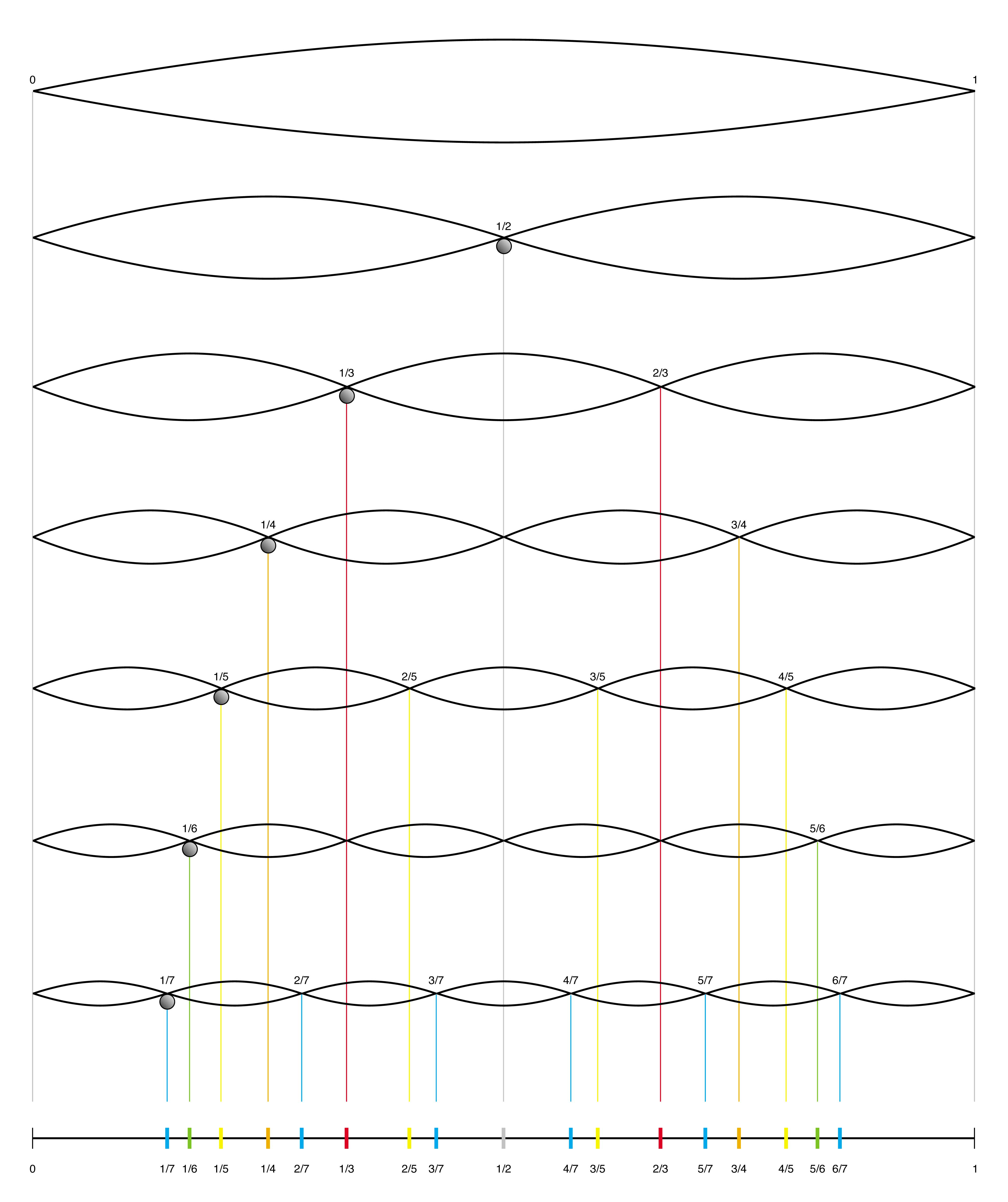
Harmonics on a vibrating string are analogous to harmonics in a power system.

In an alternating current power system, electrical energy is ideally transmitted as a pure sine wave, typically at a fundamental frequency of 50 Hz or 60 Hz. However, switching can lead to distortion in the power system, resulting in a non-sinusoidal waveform. This deviation from a pure sinusoidal waveform is measured using harmonics. The nth harmonic is a waveform at an integer multiple of the fundamental frequency. For example, a wave transmitted with a fundamental frequency of 60 Hz would have its 2nd harmonic at 120 Hz, its 3rd harmonic at 180 Hz, its 4th harmonic at 240 Hz, and so on. The waveform is considered to be a sum of all harmonic components. A K-rated power transformer is one that is designed to withstand this harmonic distortion. The K-factor is a measure of how well it mitigates distortion.

== Calculation ==
The following formula is used to calculate the K-factor of a transformer:

$$K = \sum_{h=1}^{\infin} I_h^2 h^2$$

Where:

- K is the K-factor
- h is the harmonic order
- I_{h} is the per-unit of rated rms load current at the hth harmonic order

== Typical Values ==
The following table lists typical K-factors used depending on the harmonics produced by the loads:

Typical K-factors
K-factor	Load description	Harmonic activity
1	Standard, general-purpose transformer	<15% of loads generate harmonics
4	Induction heating, AC drives	Up to 35% of loads generate harmonics
13	Institutional electronically controlled lighting	35-75% of loads generate harmonics
20	Data processing equipment, computer servers	60-100% of loads generate harmonics
30-50	Loads consistently generate harmonics	100% of loads generate harmonics

Transformers with a larger K-factor are more expensive.

== See also ==
- K-factor
- Harmonics (electrical power)
