= K-factor (marketing) =

Growth rate of websites, apps, or a customer base

In viral marketing, the K-factor can be used to describe the growth rate of websites, apps, or a customer base. The formula is roughly as follows:

$i=\text{number of invites sent by each customer }$ (e.g. if each new customer invites five friends, i = 5)
$c=\text{percent conversion of each invite }$ (e.g. if one in five invitees convert to new users, c = .2)
$$k = i * c$$

== Overview ==
This usage is borrowed from the basic reproduction number in the medical field of epidemiology in which a virus having a k-factor of 1 is in a "steady" state of neither growth nor decline, while a k-factor greater than 1 indicates exponential growth and a k-factor less than 1 indicates exponential decline. In epidemiology, the k-factor is derived from the rates of distribution and infection for a disease. "Distribution" ($i$) measures the average number of people a host will contact while still infectious, and "infection" ($c$) measures how likely an average person is to also become infected after contact with an infectious host.

== Indication ==
In the context of viral marketing, while a higher k-factor is desirable, a k-factor below 1 can still lead to viral growth. In their early days, Dropbox and WhatsApp boasted k-factors of 0.7 and 0.4, respectively, which were major contributors to their financial success. K-factor is limited to measuring how directly effective word-of-mouth or member invitation schemes are, but there are other ways for a user to come to a new app.

== Social K-factor ==
With the advent of social media, a new evolution to the K-factor concept has emerged. The Social K-factor is an indicator of how viral a website is when content is shared from the website onto social media. It is a function of the Social Coefficient, which determines how fast content is spreading through social sharing, and the Sharing Ratio, a measure of how often your content is likely to be shared.

As visitors to your website share your website's content on their social networks, the content can go viral because the social media posts attract new visitors who then share more content. The Social K-factor measures the lift delivered from social sharing.
