= K-factor (metallurgy) =

Bending capacity of sheet metal

The K-factor is the bending capacity of sheet metal, and by extension the forumulae used to calculate this. Mathematically it is an engineering aspect of geometry. Such is its intricacy in precision sheet metal bending (with press brakes in particular) that its proper application in engineering has been termed an art.

== See also ==
- Bending (metalworking)
- Engineering
- Metal
- Technology
