= K factor (traffic engineering) =

In transportation engineering, the K factor is defined as the proportion of annual average daily traffic occurring in an hour. This factor is used for designing and analyzing the flow of traffic on highways. K factors must be calculated at a continuous count station, usually an "automatic traffic recorder", for a year before being determined. Usually this number is the proportion of "annual average daily traffic" (AADT) occurring at the 30th-highest hour of traffic density from the year's-worth of data. This 30th-highest hour of traffic is also known as "K30" or the "Design Hour Factor". This factor improves traffic forecasting, which in turn improves the ability of designers and engineers to plan for efficiency and serve the needs of this particular set of traffic. Such forecasting includes the selection of pavement and inclusion of different geometric aspects of highway design, as well as the effects of lane closures and necessity of traffic lights. Engineers have reached consensus on identify K30 as reaching a reasonable peak of activity before high outliers of traffic volume are used as determinative of overall patterns. The K factor has three general characteristics:

- K generally decreases as AADT increases.
- K generally decreases as development density increases.
- K is generally highest near recreational facilities, next highest in rural and suburban areas, and lowest in urban areas.

Another notable proportions of K is the measure of K100 (the proportion of AADT occurring during the 100th highest hour of the design year). This proportion is also known as the Planning Analysis Hour Factor.

== Calculation ==
The calculation for the K factor is given by the formula:

DHV= K*AADT

in which DHV is the "Design Hourly Volume," the 30th highest hourly traffic volume (in both directions) in the year in which data was collected, by vehicles per hour. DHV could also be the 50th or 100th highest hourly traffic volume (in both directions) in the year in which data was collected, by vehicles per hour; but one would need to mention that by saying that this is the K50 or K100 factor.

== Usage ==
The use of the K30 standard is mandated for the Highway Performance Monitoring System's comparisons of congestion. The K Factor also helps calculate the peak-to-daily ratio of traffic. K30 helps maintain a healthy volume to capacity ratio. K50 and K100 will sometimes be seen. K50 and K100 will not use the 30th highest hourly traffic volumes but the 50th or 100th highest hourly traffic volume when calculating the K factor.
