= Toyota Tercel =

Japanese subcompact car

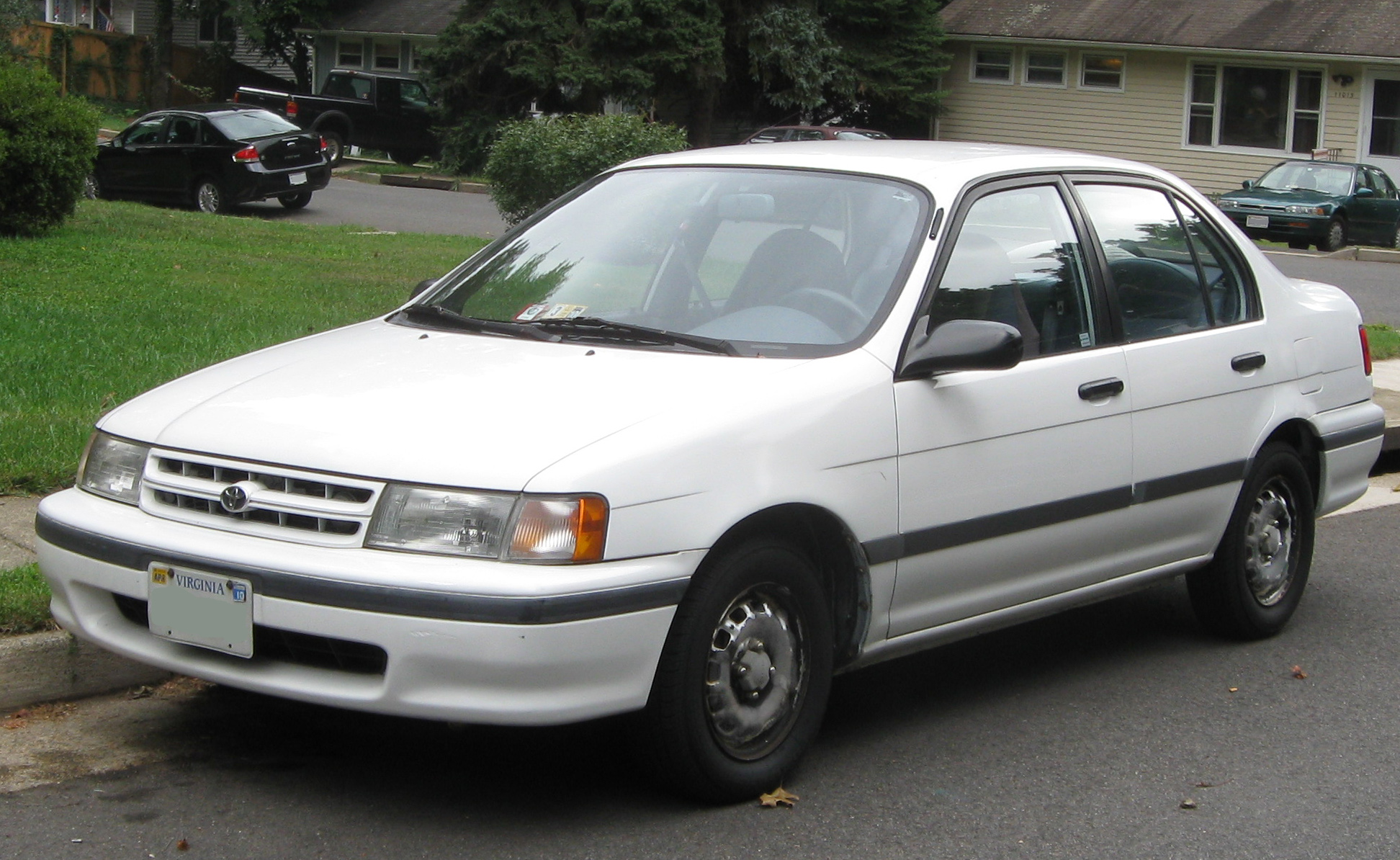
- The fourth generation Toyota Tercel DX sedan (EL42, US)

Overview
- Manufacturer: Toyota
- Also called: Toyota Corsa (Japan); Toyota Corolla II (Japan, 1982–1999); Toyota Corolla Tercel (United States, 1978–1982); Toyota Soluna (Thailand and Indonesia, 1996–2003)
- Production: August 1978 – July 1999 (extended production as Soluna until 2003)
- Assembly: Japan: Toyota, Aichi (Takaoka plant); Hamura, Tokyo (Hino plant)

Body and chassis
- Class: Subcompact car

Chronology
- Successor: Toyota Platz/Echo/Yaris; Toyota Duet (Japan, for Corolla II); Toyota Vios (Asia, for Soluna)

The Toyota Tercel (Japanese: トヨタ・ターセル, Hepburn: Toyota Tāseru) is a subcompact car manufactured by Toyota from 1978 until 1999 across five generations, in five body configurations sized between the Corolla and the Starlet. Manufactured at the Takaoka plant in Toyota City, Japan, and sharing its platform with the Cynos (aka Paseo) and the Starlet, the Tercel was marketed variously as the Toyota Corolla II (トヨタ・カローラII, Toyota Karōra II)—sold at Toyota Japanese dealerships called Toyota Corolla Stores—and was replaced by the Platz in 1999. It was also known as the Toyota Corsa (トヨタ・コルサ, Toyota Korusa) and sold at Toyopet Store locations. Starting with the second generation, the Tercel dealership network was changed to Vista Store, as its badge engineered sibling, the Corolla II, was exclusive to Corolla Store locations.

The Tercel was the first front-wheel drive vehicle produced by Toyota, although it was the only front-wheel drive Toyota to have a longitudinally mounted engine. For example, the E80 series Corolla's frame (except AE85 and AE86) is similar to the L20 series Tercel's frame. Also, Toyota designed the A series engine for the Tercel, attempting simultaneously to achieve good fuel economy and performance and low emissions. Choice of body styles increased as well, with the addition of a four-door sedan.

Tercel is an obsolete term for a male falcon, which is smaller than the female; similarly, the Tercel was slightly smaller than the Corolla. The early Tercels have a logo on the trunk with a stylized falcon as the T in Tercel. All Tercels were assembled at the Takaoka factory in Toyota City, Aichi or by Hino Motors in Hamura, Tokyo. Hino assembled the third generation Tercel from 1986 to 1990 for the two-door and some three-door models. When Japanese production of the Tercel/Corsa/Corolla II (and the related Cynos/Paseo coupés) came to an end in 1999, 4,968,935 examples had been built.

== First generation (L10; 1978) ==
First generation (L10)
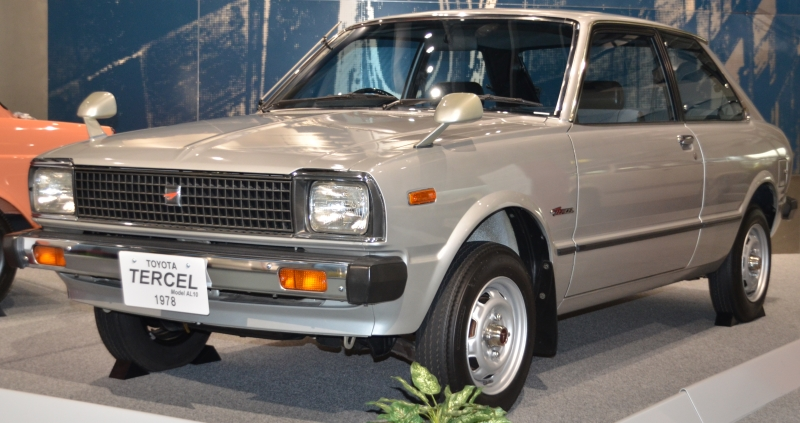
- Toyota Tercel 1500 Hi-Deluxe (AL10, Japan)

Overview
- Also called: Toyota Corsa (Japan); Toyota Corolla Tercel (US)
- Production: August 1978 – April 1982

Body and chassis
- Body style: 2/4-door sedan; 3-door hatchback
- Layout: Longitudinal front-engine, front-wheel-drive

Powertrain
- Engine: 1.3 L 2A I4 (AL11); 1.5 L 1A I4 (AL10); 1.5 L 3A I4 (AL12)
- Transmission: 3-speed automatic A55; 4- or 5-speed manual

Dimensions
- Wheelbase: 2,500 mm (98.4 in)
- Length: 3,960 mm (155.9 in) (hatchback); 3,990 mm (157.1 in) (sedan)
- Width: 1,555 mm (61.2 in)
- Height: 1,355 mm (53.3 in) (hatchback); 1,375 mm (54.1 in) (sedan)

The Tercel was introduced in Japan in August 1978, Europe in March 1979 (Geneva Motor Show) and the United States in 1980. It was originally sold as either a two- or four-door sedan, or as a three-door hatchback. The hatchback's rear design was the result of using taillights similar in design to those used on the bigger Mark II: the Tercel was originally intended to be sold through Toyopet Stores, alongside the Mark II. The Tercel ended up being marketed through the Corolla Store and the Diesel Store locations in Japan, while a version badged "Toyota Corsa" was marketed in parallel through the separate Toyopet distribution network. In the United States it was named the "Corolla Tercel". Models sold in the US were powered by a 1,452 cc SOHC four-cylinder 1A-C engine producing 60 hp (45 kW) at 4,800 rpm. Transmission choices were either a four- or five-speed manual, or a three-speed automatic available with the 1.5-litre engine from August 1979 on.

In the Japanese market, the 1,500 cc engine developed 80 PS (59 kW) at 5,600 rpm, while the 1.3-litre 2A engine, added in June 1979, offered a claimed 74 PS (54 kW). In Europe, mainly, the 1.3-litre version was available, with 65 PS (48 kW).

In this new front-wheel-drive design, the first for Toyota, the engine is mounted longitudinally. The transmission is mounted under the floorpan, as is the case in a rear-wheel-drive car. Unlike a rear-wheel-drive car, the transmission has a ring and pinion gear on the front part of the transmission, underneath the engine. The engine, transmission and differential are located a little off of the centre line of the car. Halfshafts then extend from the transmission to the front wheels. This made for a taller package than usual, making the beltline higher as well, but Toyota felt that traditionalists might be scared off by a transverse setup. As early as 1980, Toyota also hinted that this setup made the conversion to a four-wheel-drive setup easier, although such a version had to wait for the second generation. The Tercel also had rack and pinion steering, the first time such a design was used by Toyota since the 2000GT.

In August 1980, the Tercel (and Corsa) underwent a facelift, with considerable changes to the front and minor ones to the interior and rear. The 1A engine was replaced by the 3A of identical displacement but now with 83 PS (61 kW). This engine eschewed the TGP lean burn design used on the 1A, instead depending on a catalytic converter to meet the ever more stringent emissions standards of the time.

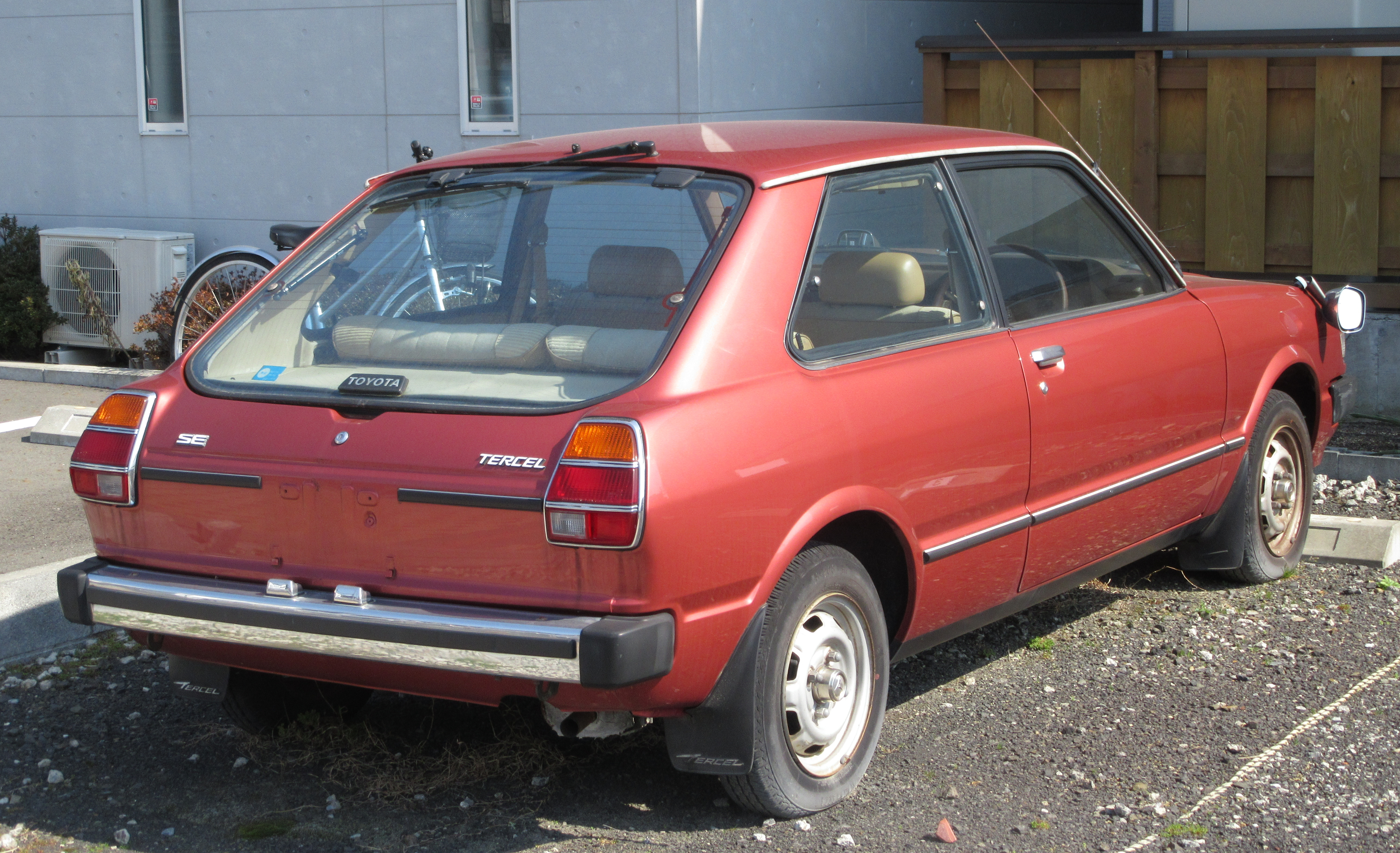
1980 Tercel three-door

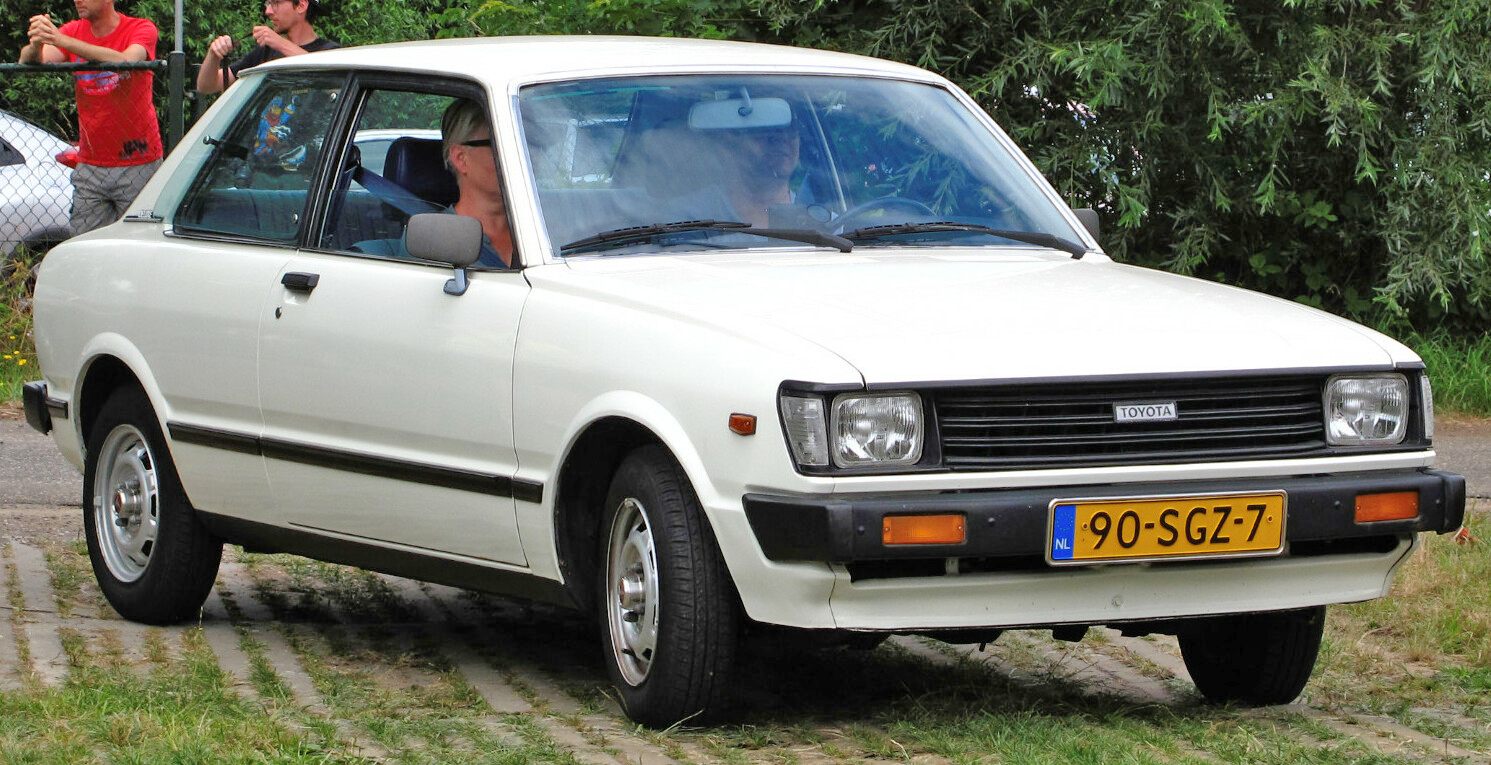
1981 Tercel two-door (facelift)

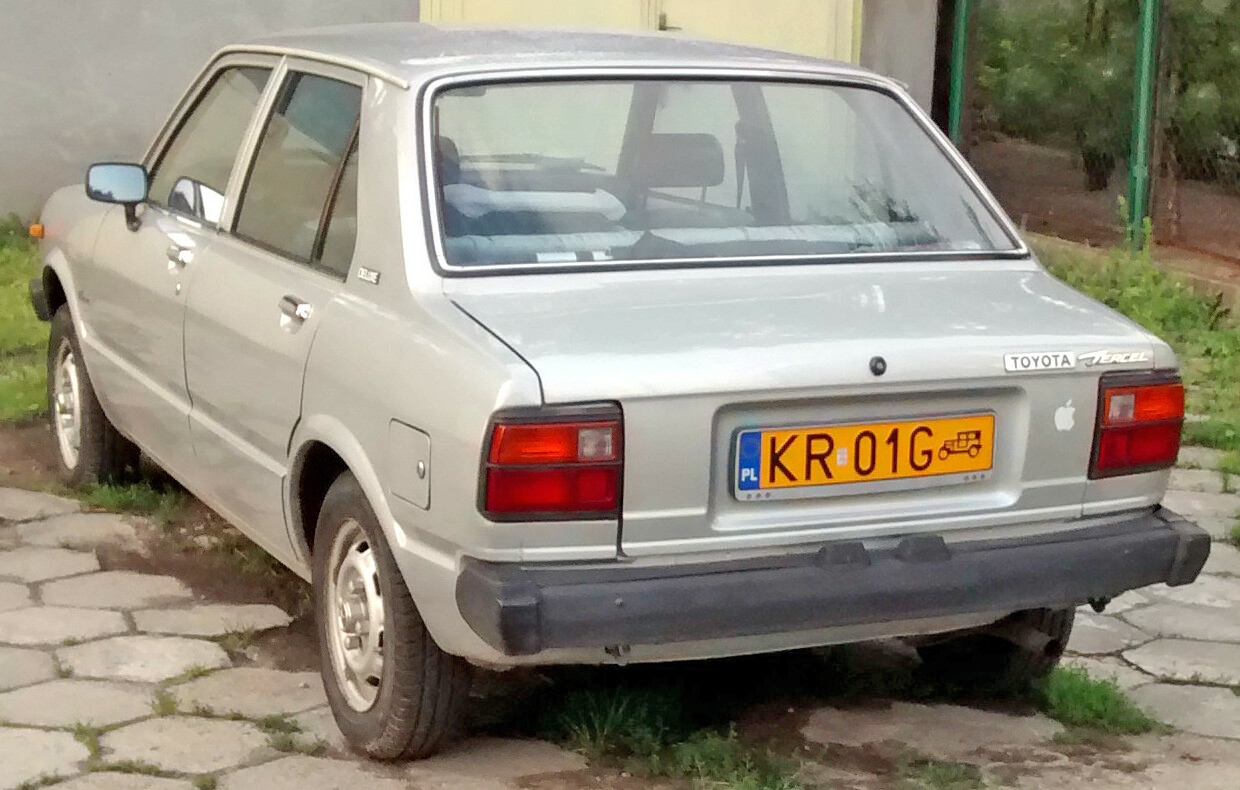
Tercel L11 four-door

== Second generation (L20; 1982) ==
Second generation (L20)
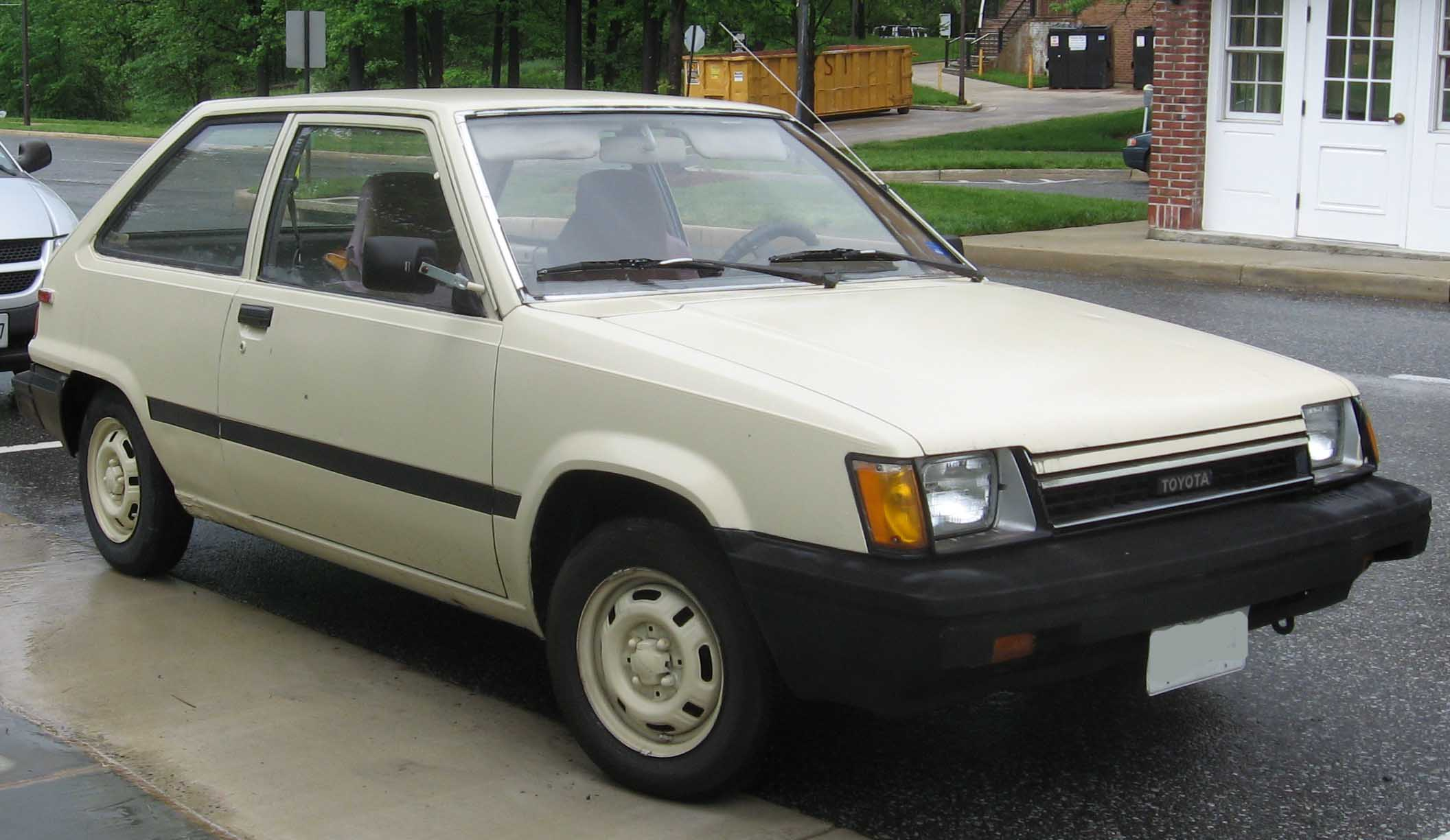
- Toyota Tercel 1500 3-door Hatchback (AL21, US)

Overview
- Also called: Toyota Corsa (Japan); Toyota Corolla II (hatchback, Japan); Toyota Sprinter Carib
- Production: May 1982 – February 1988

Body and chassis
- Body style: 3/5-door hatchback; 4-door sedan; 5-door station wagon
- Layout: Longitudinal front-engine, front-wheel-drive or four-wheel-drive

Powertrain
- Engine: 1.3 L 2A I4 (AL20); 1.5 L 3A I4 (AL21/25)
- Transmission: 3-speed automatic; 4-speed manual; 5-speed manual; 6-speed manual

Dimensions
- Wheelbase: 2,430 mm (95.7 in)

Toyota redesigned the Tercel in May 1982, now called the Tercel in all markets. Its internal model code is the L20 series. It was available in three- or five-door hatchback models or a four-door station wagon, and also as a four-door sedan in Japan. The station wagon, known in Japan as the Sprinter Carib (Japanese: Toyota Sprinter Carib, short for "caribou"), was introduced in August 1982. The wagon was also available with four-wheel drive (front-wheel-drive wagons were only available in select markets). In Japan, a four-wheel-drive sedan was also available; it, too remained in production alongside the wagon version even after the introduction of the third generation Tercel. Standard front-wheel drive vehicles (and four-wheel drive wagons not equipped with the six-speed manual transmission) came with either a three-speed automatic or a four- or five-speed manual transmission. The four-speed manual was reserved for the very simplest version in North American markets.

In Japan, body styles on offer were different for the different models as they had to suit the lineups of the various dealer networks. the Corolla II was originally only available as a three- or five-door hatchback, while the Tercel and the Corsa were both offered exclusively with the five-door or the four-door sedan body styles. The second generation Tercel was moved from the Corolla to the Vista sales network, while the Corsa remained available through Toyopet stores, and the Corolla II in the Corolla dealer network. The Toyota Diesel sales network, which had handled some Tercel sales earlier, was shut down in the 1980s.

As only the first two generations were sold officially in Europe, this was the last generation of the Tercel series available there, with either the hatchback or station wagon bodywork. In Japan, power outputs were as follows:

- 1295 cc 2A-U: 75 PS (55 kW) at 6,000 rpm
- 1452 cc 3A-U: 83 PS (61 kW) at 5,600 rpm (9.0:1 compression, 82.05–86.05)
- 1452 cc 3A-U: 85 PS (63 kW) at 5,600 rpm (9.3:1 compression, 86.03–88.02)
- 1452 cc 3A-HU: 86 PS (63 kW) at 6,000 rpm (variable venturi carburetor, 9.3:1 compression, 82.05–84.08)
- 1,452 cc 3A-SU: 90 PS (66 kW) at 6,000 rpm (twin variable venturi carburettors, swirl intake version, 84.08–88.02)

North American Tercels were all fitted with the 1.5-litre engine, producing 63 hp (47 kW) at 4,800 rpm. In Europe, both the 1.3 and the 1.5 litres were available, as per national importers' preferences. As with the earlier generation, engine and transmission were still mounted longitudinally, and the arrangements were the same. In some markets, engines received minor improvements, such as reformulated combustion chambers (to improve emissions and fuel economy), higher compression ratios, and new auxiliary devices for the carburettor assemblies.

The four-wheel-drive models (chassis code AL25, only with the 1.5 litre engine) could be equipped with six-speed manual transmissions, and could be shifted from two- to four-wheel drive without coming to a stop. The sixth gear it carries is an "extra low" (EL) first gear, a standard transmission gear with a very low (4.71:1) gear-ratio. The EL gear generates a 17.6:1 final drive ratio, giving the driver the torque needed to extract the vehicle from conditions which otherwise may have trapped it. It is only available when in four-wheel drive, and because of its low gear-ratio it is suitable only for very low-speed use. Also included with better equipped four-wheel-drive models was an inclinometer above the radio and air conditioner that measures the tilt of the car.

The new Tercel 4WD was built from existing pieces in the Toyota inventory. The engine, transaxle and front-wheel-drive system were from the existing Tercel; the longitudinally mounted engine made such a conversion a simple affair. The coil-sprung, live rear axle and the drive shaft was taken from the rear-wheel drive Corolla. The only major part specifically designed for the new Tercel 4WD was the transfer case, built into the transmission. The transfer case provides the driver with three different power arrangements: Normally, the car is operated with front-wheel drive. When the driver pulls the 4WD selector lever back into four-wheel drive, or presses a button on the gear selector for the automatic transmission, front and rear differentials are driven at the same RPM via a direct mechanical coupling. There is no conventional center differential, so the four-wheel-drive system can be used only on loose or slippery road surfaces (such as snow, gravel, or sand); otherwise the drivetrain experiences severe wear, and handling is compromised. The third power option (which was only available on the six-speed manual) is low range. This is not the same as the low-range power option found in a truck or conventional SUV, as the Tercel lacks a high-range-low-range transfer case. When the lever is placed in four-wheel-drive mode it becomes possible to down shift the vehicle from first to EL.

In 1985, there were minor changes to gear ratios and to the grille design, and the interior was updated in 1986. The Tercel wagon (and four-door sedan in Japan) continued with the same design until February 1988 (when the Sprinter Carib was replaced by a larger, Corolla-based design), while the sedans and hatchbacks moved on to the newer design.

In 2025, CBC in Canada reported on a man whose Tercel wagon had been driven over 1,253,070 km (778,622 miles) and was still in operation.

=== Europe ===
Versions available in Europe:

- 1.3 litre DX (three-door hatchback, five-door hatchback)
- 1.3 litre GL (three-door hatchback, five-door hatchback)
- 1.5 litre GL (three-door hatchback, five-door hatchback)
- 1.5 litre 4WD (five-door estate, only version from 1986 onwards)

Engines:

- 1,295 cc 2A: 65 PS (48 kW) at 6,000 rpm
- 1,452 cc 3A/3A-C: 71 PS (52 kW) at 5,600 rpm

=== Gallery ===
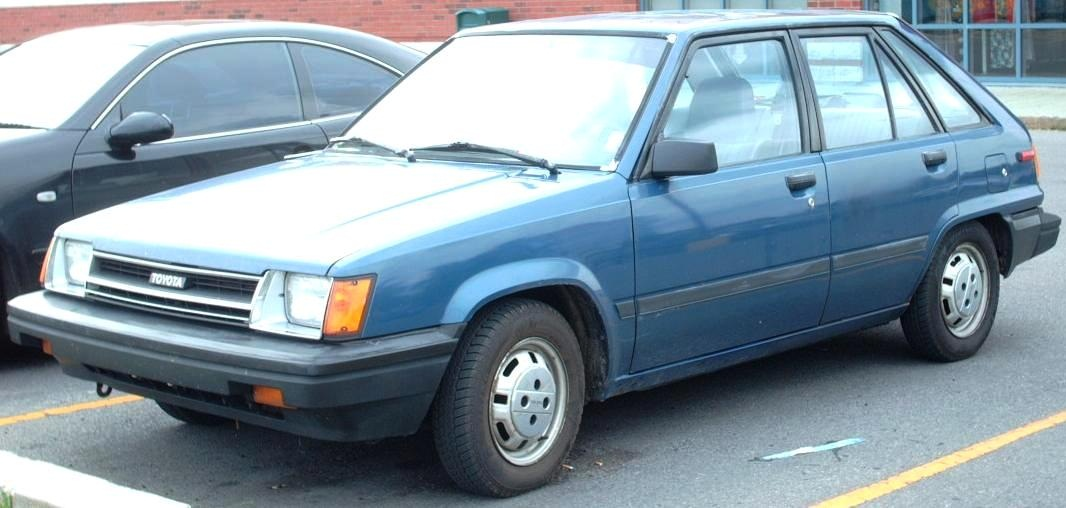
1985–1986 Tercel 5-door (AL21, North America)

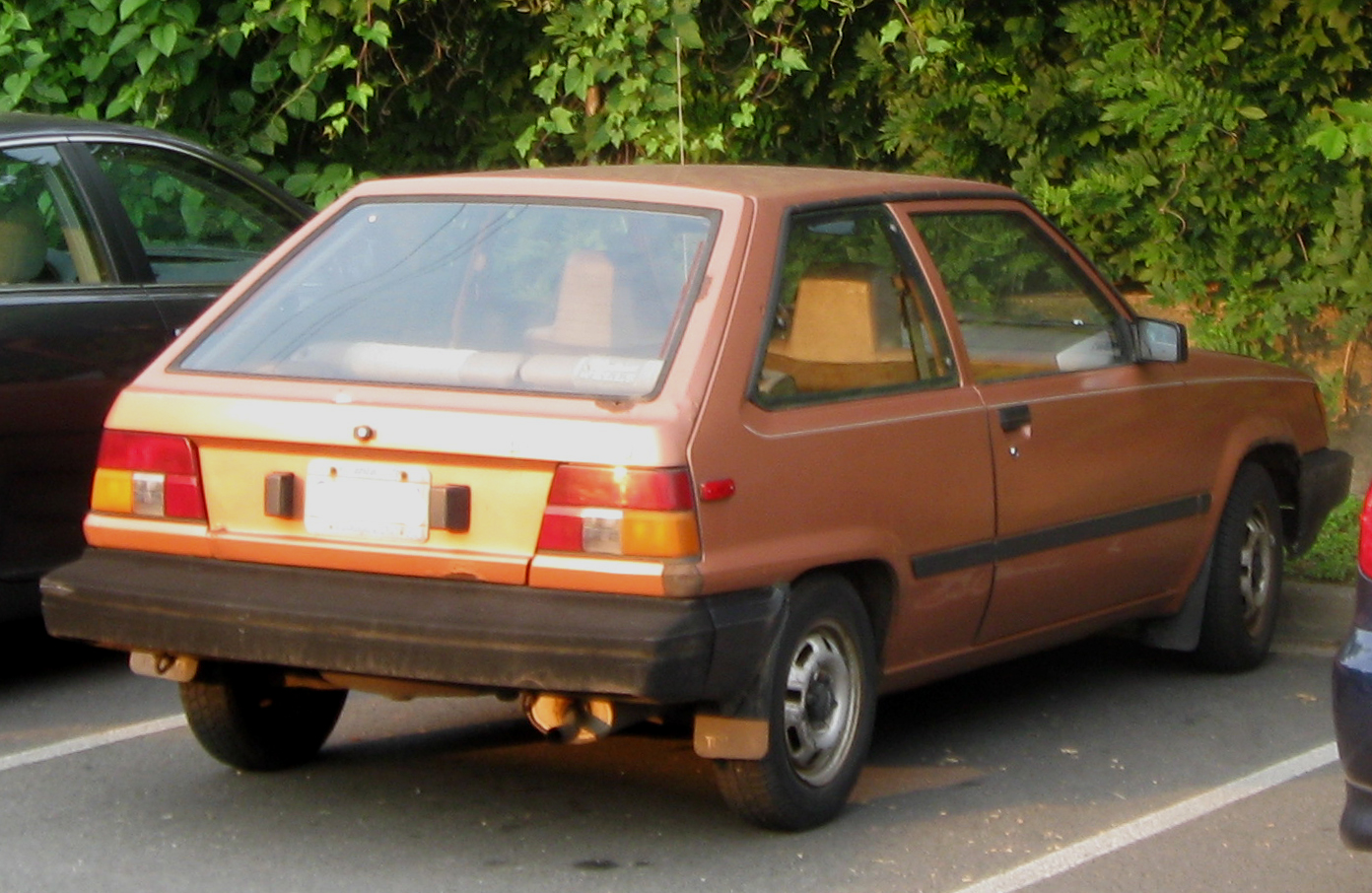
1983–1984 Tercel 3-door (AL21, US)

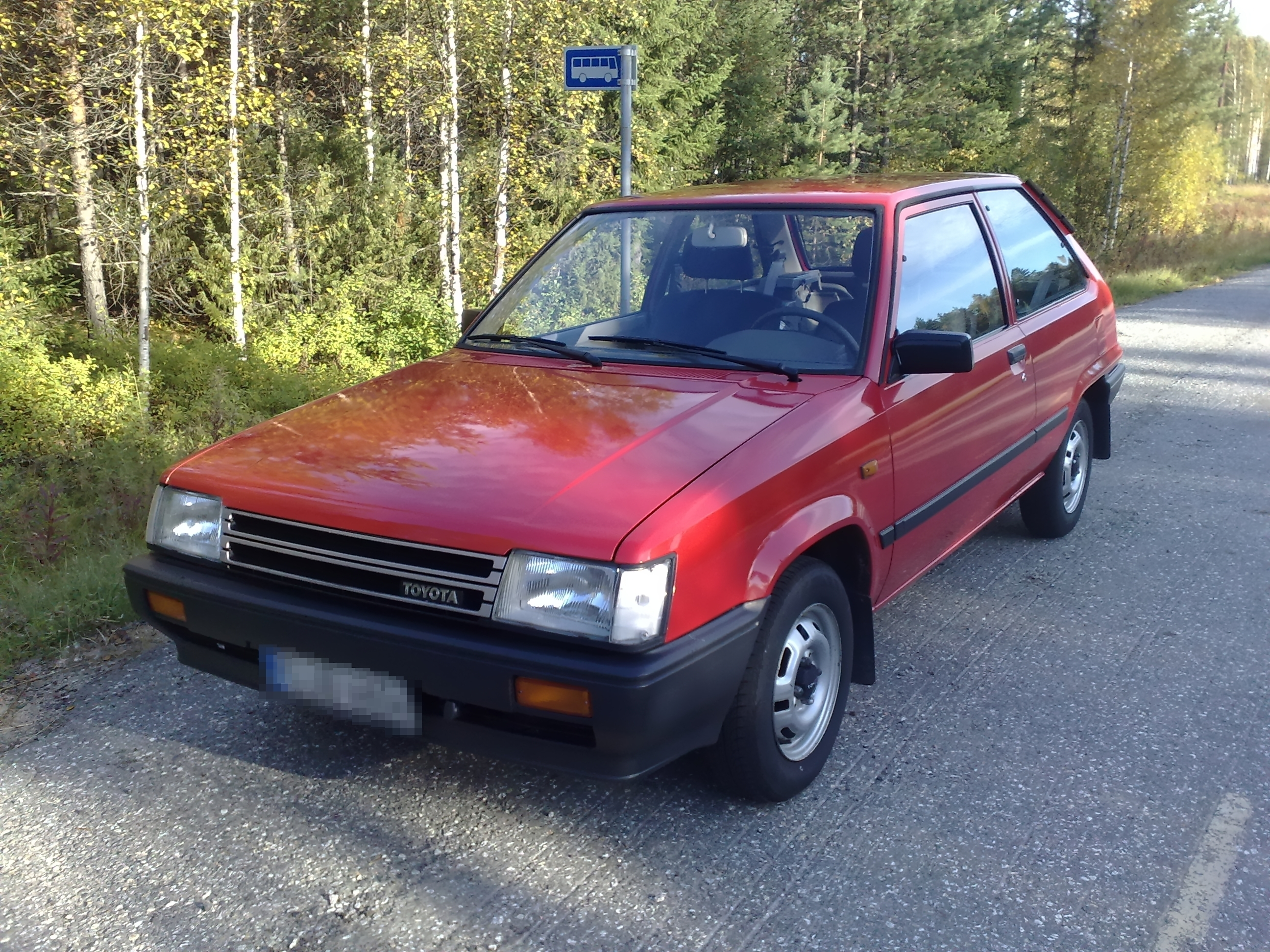
Tercel 1300 (AL20, Europe)

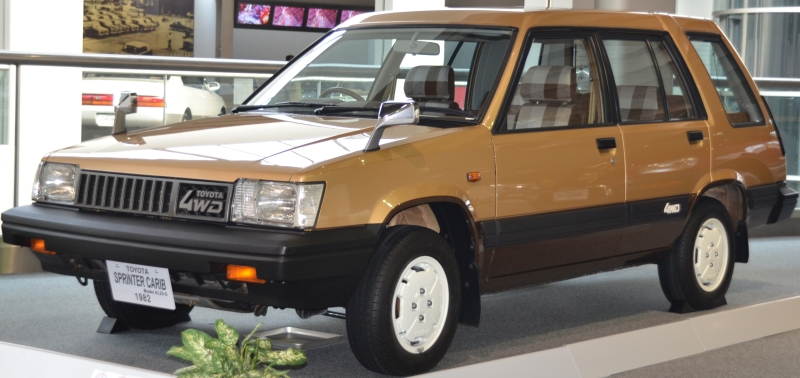
Toyota Sprinter Carib (AL25, Japan)

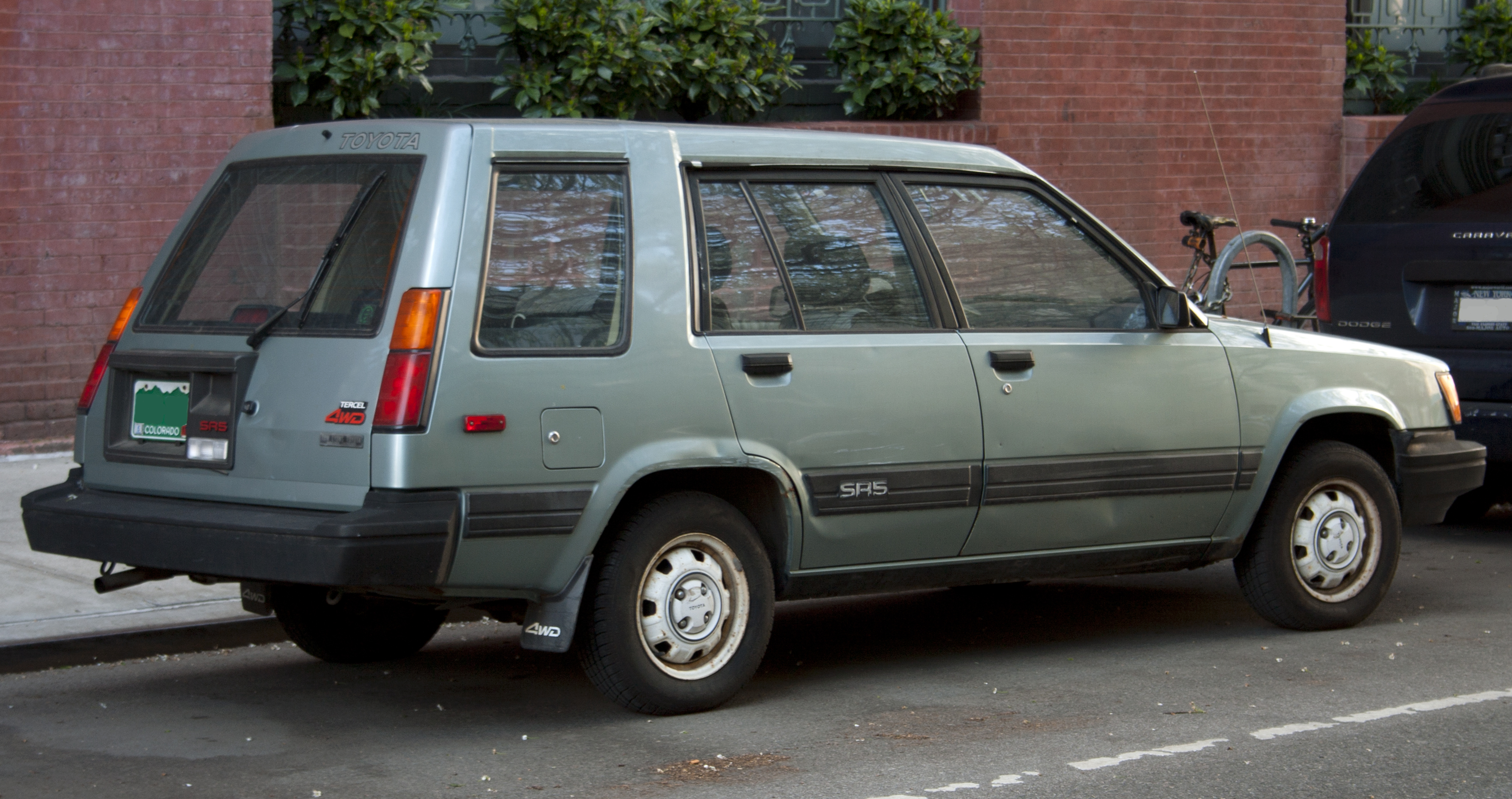
1986 Tercel wagon (AL25, US)

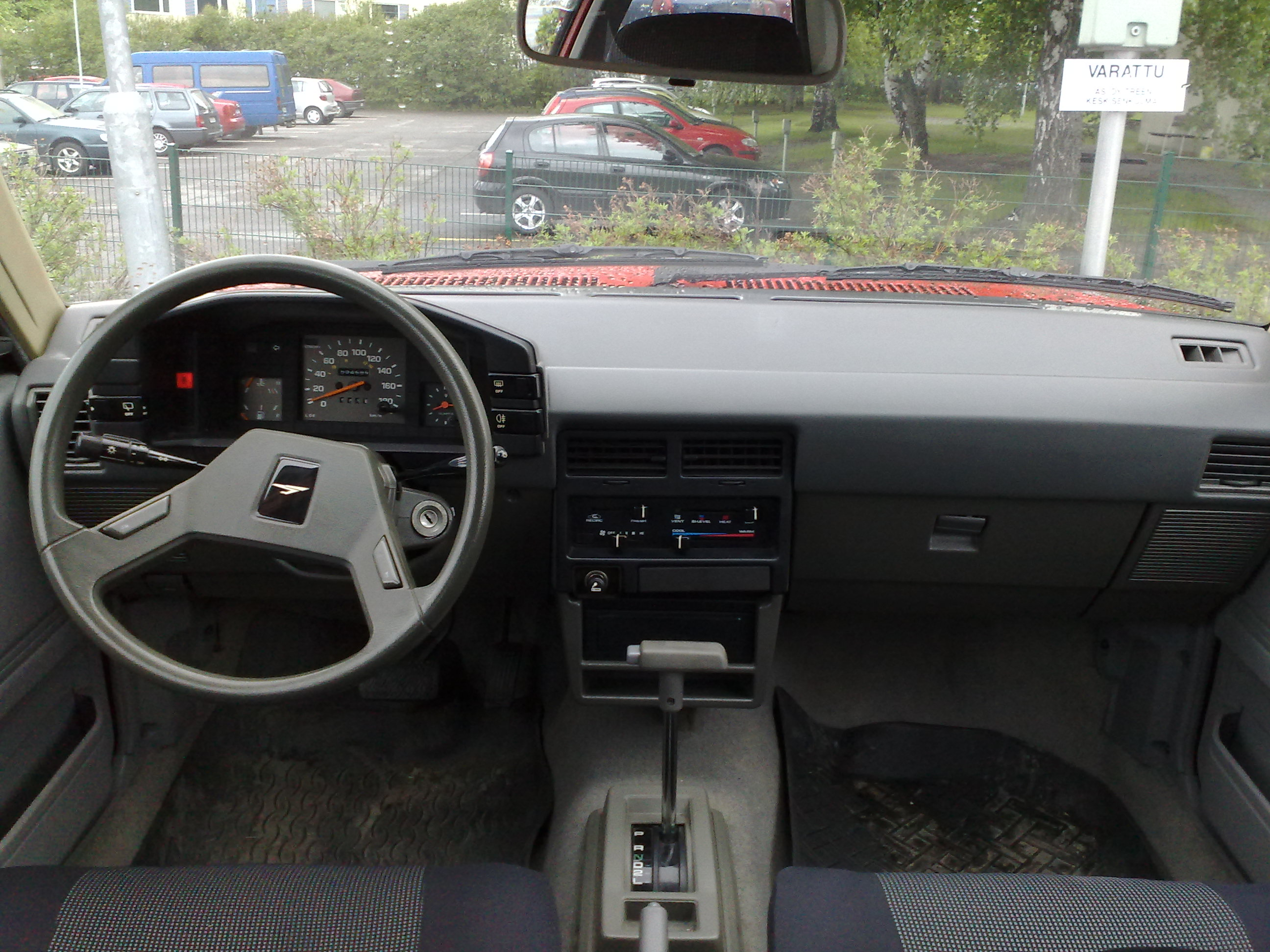
Dash and interior of 1983 Tercel

== Third generation (L30; 1986) ==
Third generation (L30)
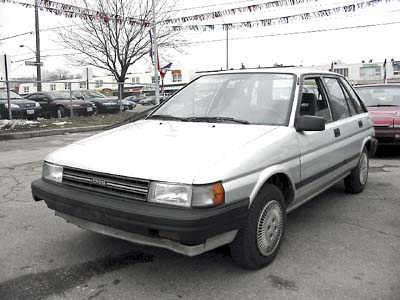
- Toyota Tercel 5-door hatchback (EL31, US)

Overview
- Also called: Toyota Corsa/Corolla II (hatchback, Japan)
- Production: May 1986–1990

Body and chassis
- Body style: 2-door sedan; 3/5-door hatchback
- Layout: Transverse front-engine, front-wheel-drive
- Related: Toyota Starlet

Powertrain
- Engine: Petrol: 1.3 L 2E I4 (EL30); 1.5 L 3E/3E-E I4 (EL31); 1.5 L 3E-TE turbo I4 (EL31); Diesel: 1.5 L 1N-T turbo I4 (NL30)
- Transmission: 4- or 5-speed manual; 3- or 4-speed automatic

Dimensions
- Wheelbase: 2,380 mm (93.7 in)
- Length: 3,910–3,995 mm (153.9–157.3 in) (hatchback); 4,235 mm (166.7 in) (sedan)
- Width: 1,625 mm (64.0 in) (hatchback); 1,635 mm (64.4 in) (sedan)
- Height: 1,370–1,440 mm (53.9–56.7 in) (hatchback); 1,315 mm (51.8 in) (sedan)
- Curb weight: 800–950 kg (1,764–2,094 lb)

In 1986, Toyota introduced the slightly larger third generation Tercel with a new 12-valve engine which featured a variable venturi carburetor, and later models with EFI. From this generation on, the engine is mounted transversely, with the transmission mounted on the right side of the engine in a layout developed by Dante Giacosa and earlier popularised in such vehicles as the Fiat 128 and Volkswagen Golf. Other changes included revised rack-and-pinion steering and a newly designed, fully independent suspension. The Tercel continued in North America as Toyota's least expensive vehicle, while it was no longer offered in Europe. In other markets, the smaller Starlet was also offered.

In Japan, the top trim package Tercel Retra GP-Turbo came installed with Toyota's four wheel independent suspension, labeled "Pegasus", along with their "Lasre" branded multi-port fuel injection, using the 115 PS (85 kW) 3E-TEU engine. "Retra" was short for retractable, a reference to the car's unique hidden headlamps.

In 1986, Toyota also introduced a turbodiesel version with Toyota's 1.5-litre 1N-T engine coupled with a manual five-speed transmission. This was exclusively sold in the Japanese market.

The wagon version continued to be of the previous generation, as did the four-door sedan (which was not exported to most countries), until it was moved to the Corolla's underpinnings in 1988. The variable venturi carburettor reportedly has some problems, especially in the earlier models, such as a too rich mixture, which is caused by the too thin Teflon coating of the fuel-metering needle, which erodes over time due to friction. It also has had problems with the compensator (choke device), which can also cause overly rich mixture when not working properly.

North America

The third generation Tercel arrived in North America in late 1986, for the 1987 model year. As with Tercels globally, it received the new 12-valve E-series engine family. In North America, only the 1.5-litre engine was available, producing 78 hp (58 kW) in federalized trim. In 1987 (for the 1988 model year), Toyota introduced the Tercel EZ to North America. Fitted with less standard equipment than the standard Tercel it has vinyl upholstery, a four-speed manual transmission, rubber mats instead of carpeting, and a deleted passenger's side sun visor. This was also when the two-door sedan model was introduced, sometimes referred to as a "coupe" in the United States where it was offered as base and DX model grades. The two-door sedan was exclusively sold in North America, as most economy car buyers elsewhere expected either a hatchback or four doors on their sedans.

For the 1990 model year, the Tercel Wagon was discontinued, having been upgraded to the larger platform used for the Corolla/Sprinter Carib. Non-motorized two-point passive seatbelts for the front seats were introduced in 1990 in the United States only.

=== Gallery ===
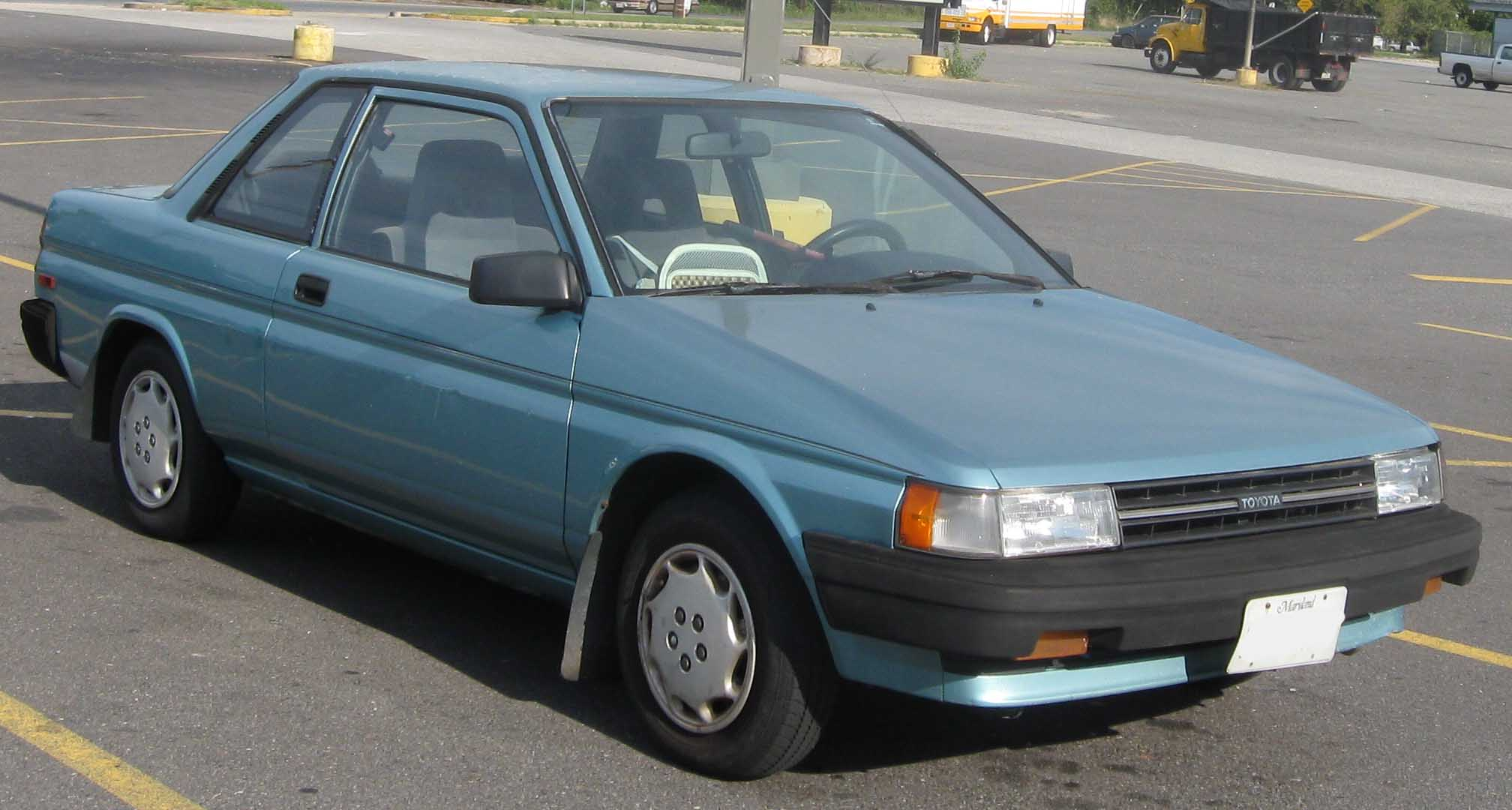
Toyota Tercel 2-door sedan (EL31, US)

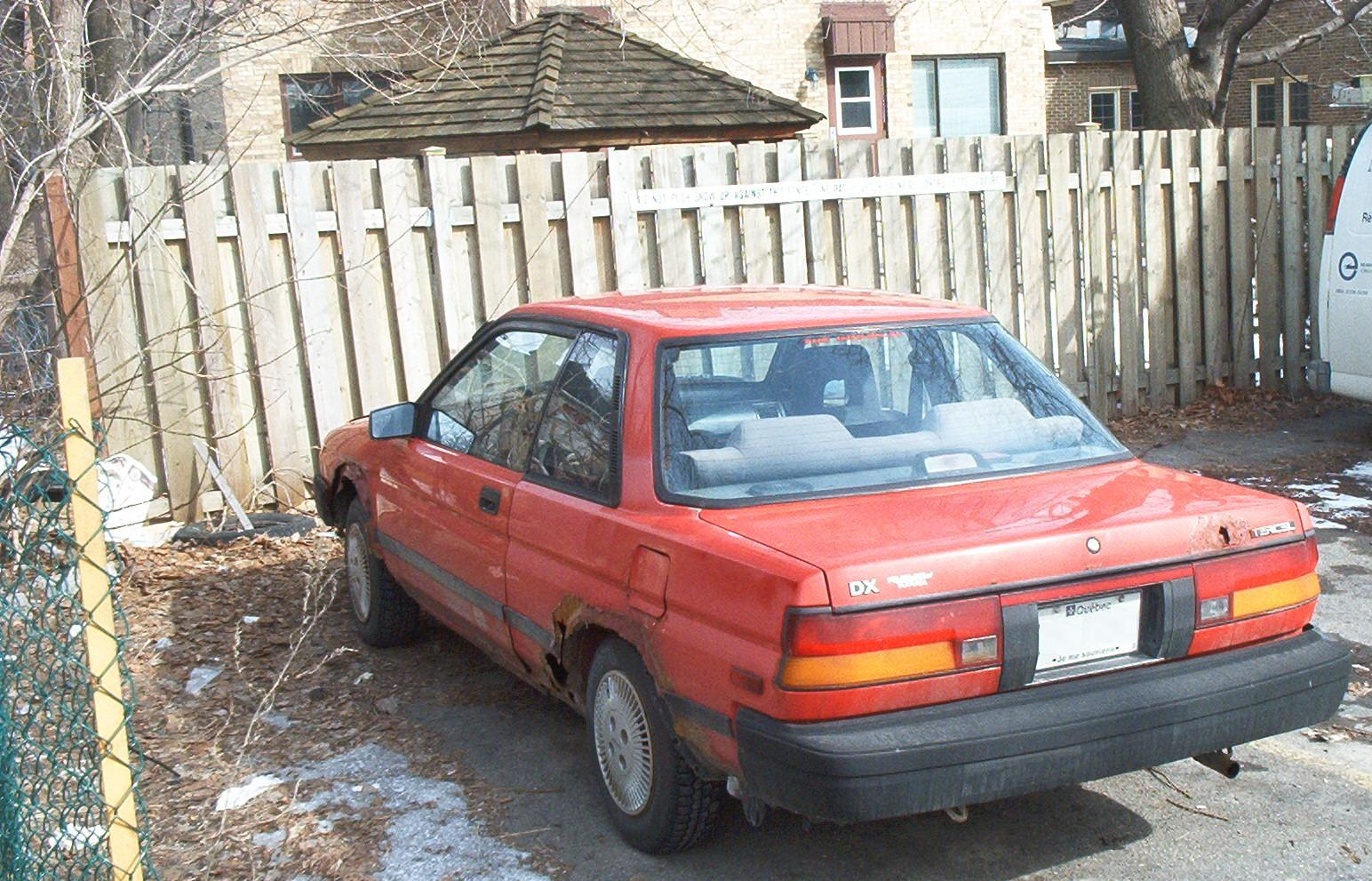
Toyota Tercel DX 2-door sedan (EL31, Canada)

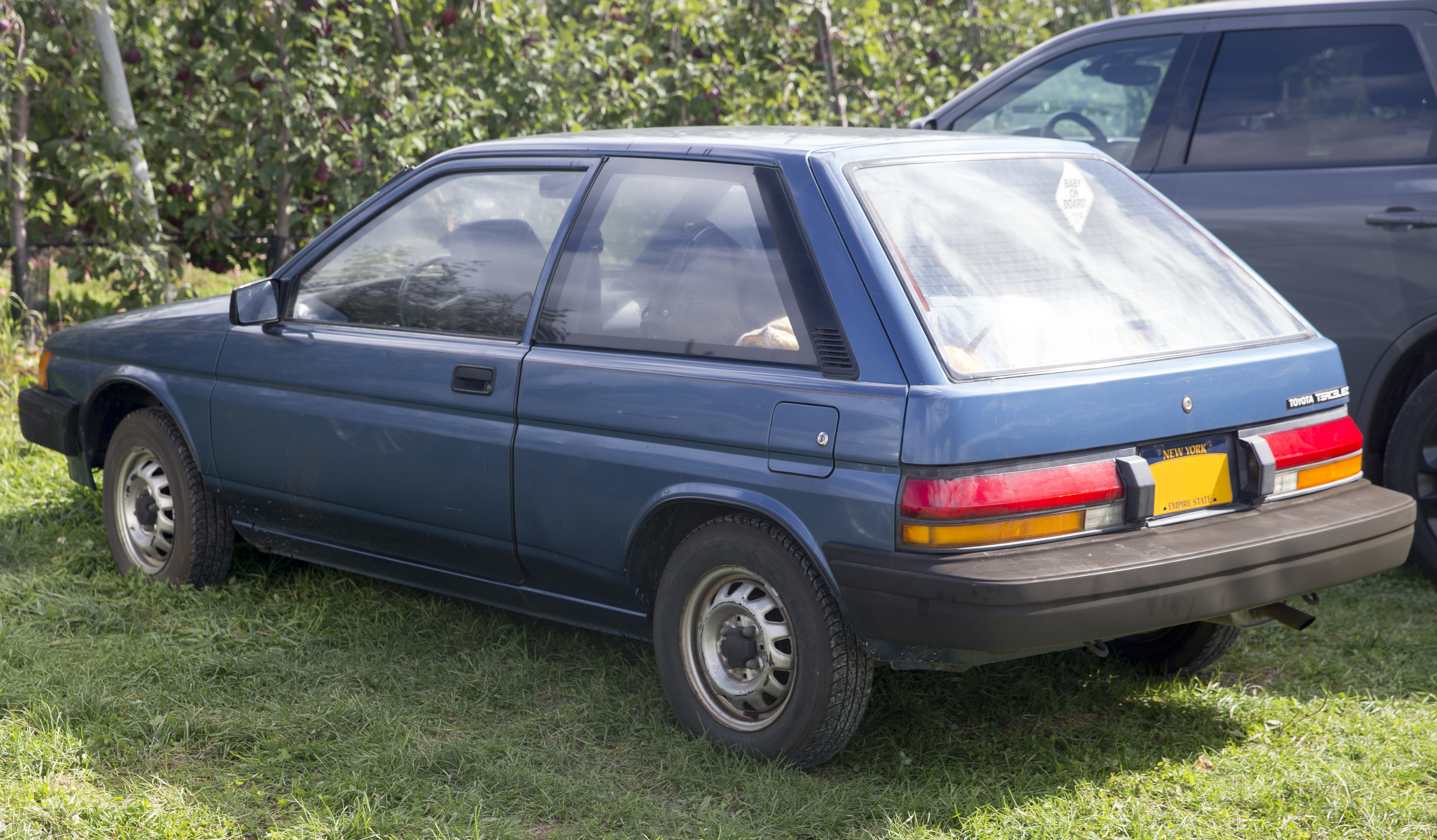
1988 Toyota Tercel EZ 3-door hatchback (EL31, US)

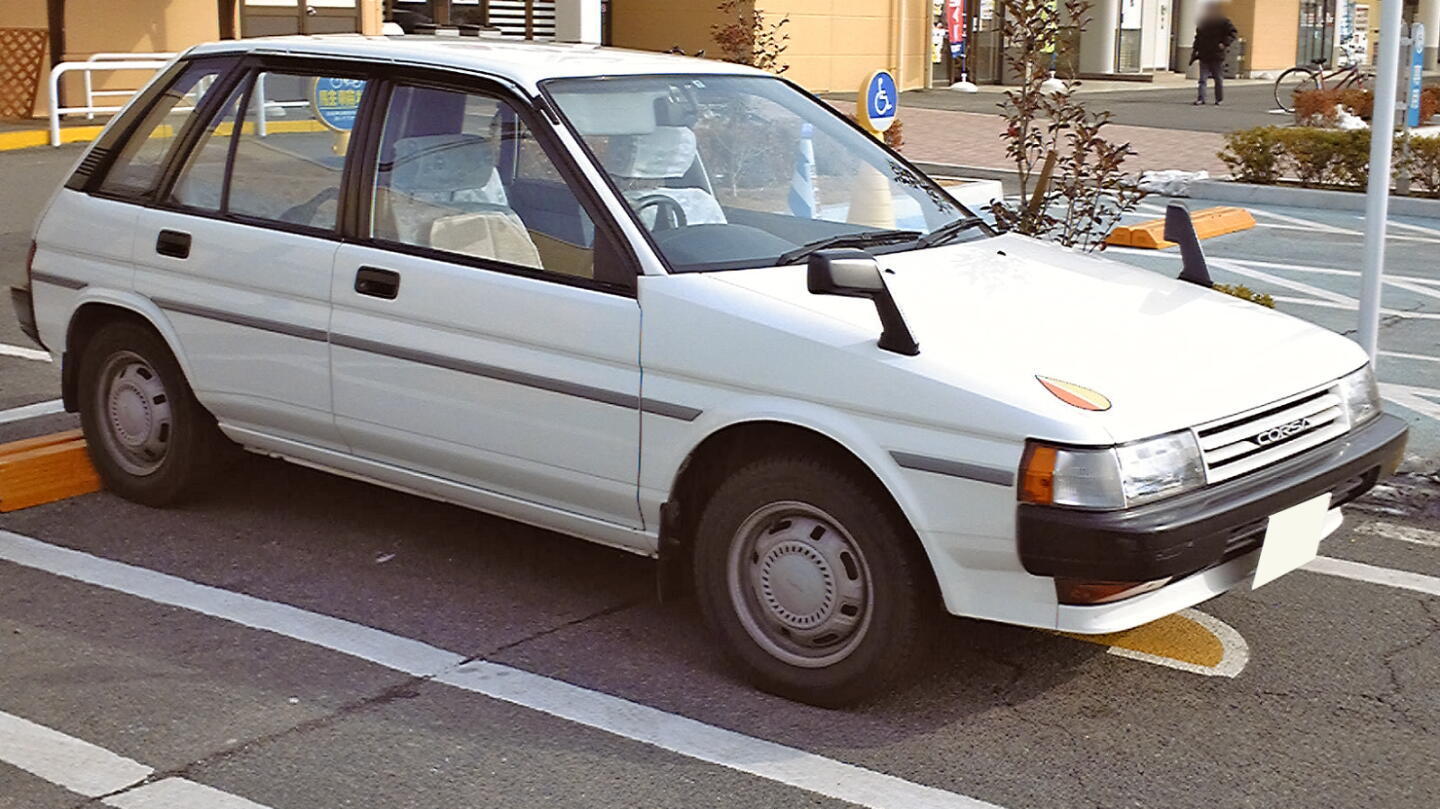
Toyota Corsa 5-door hatchback (Japan)

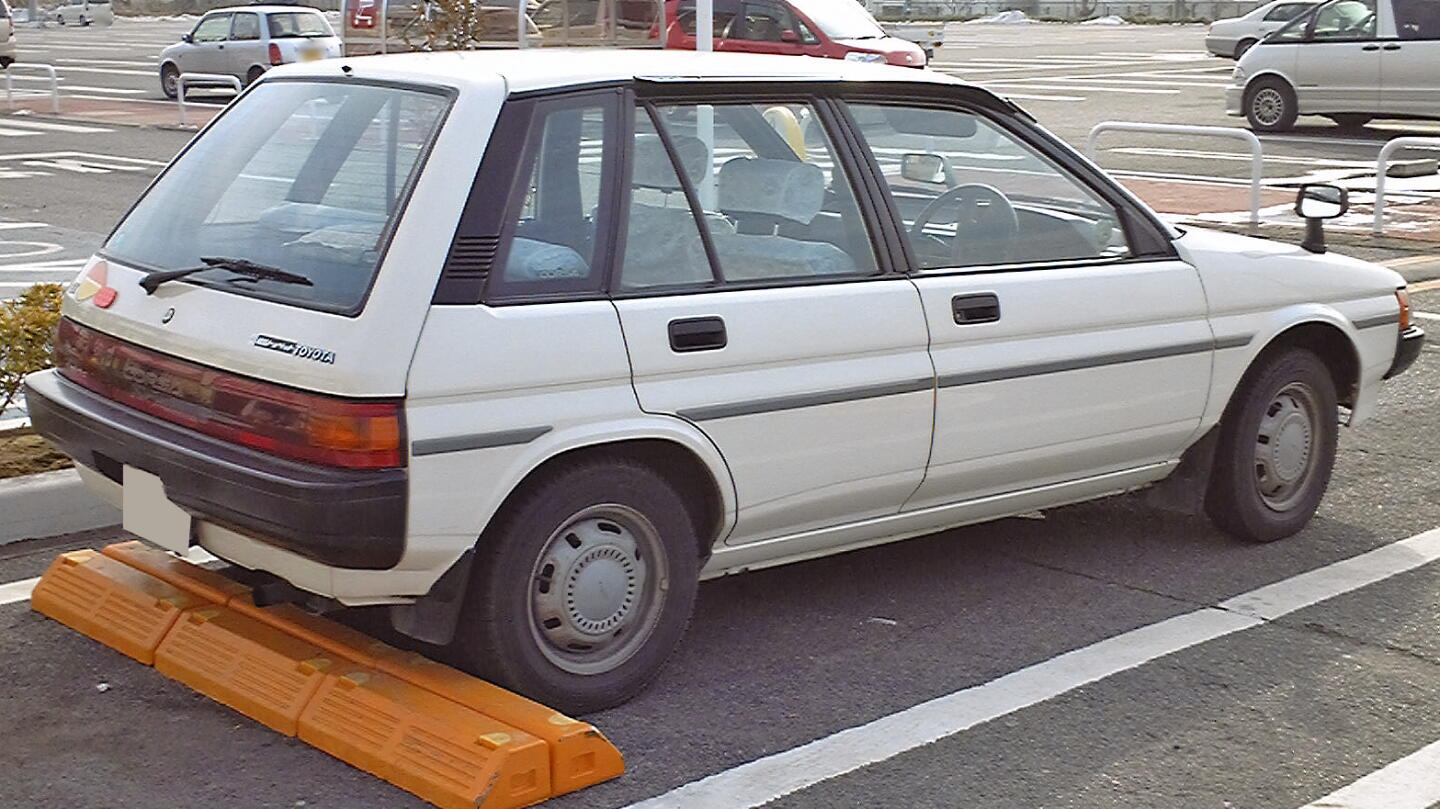
Toyota Corsa 5-door hatchback (Japan)

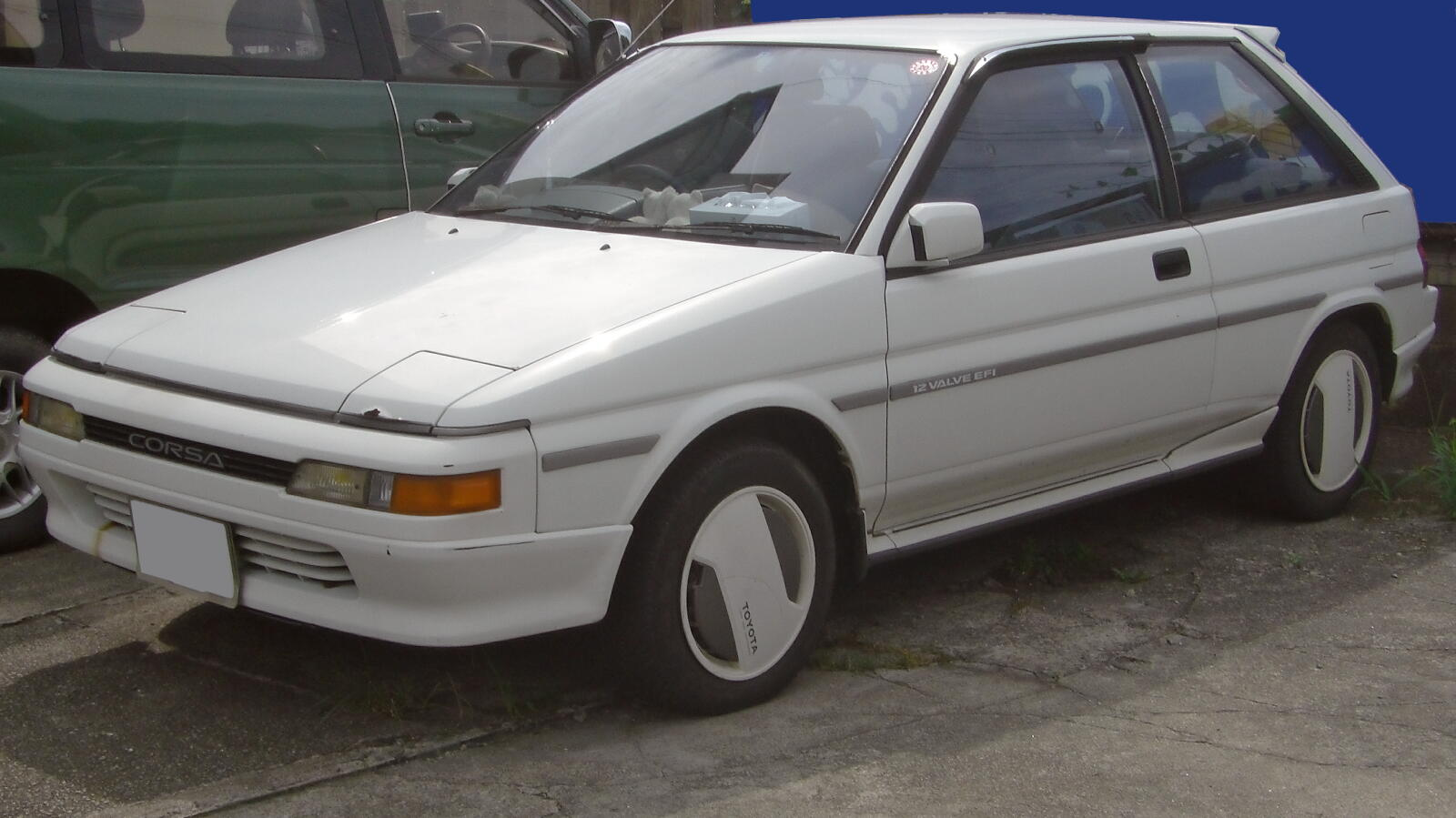
Toyota Corsa Retra SXi 3-door hatchback (Japan)

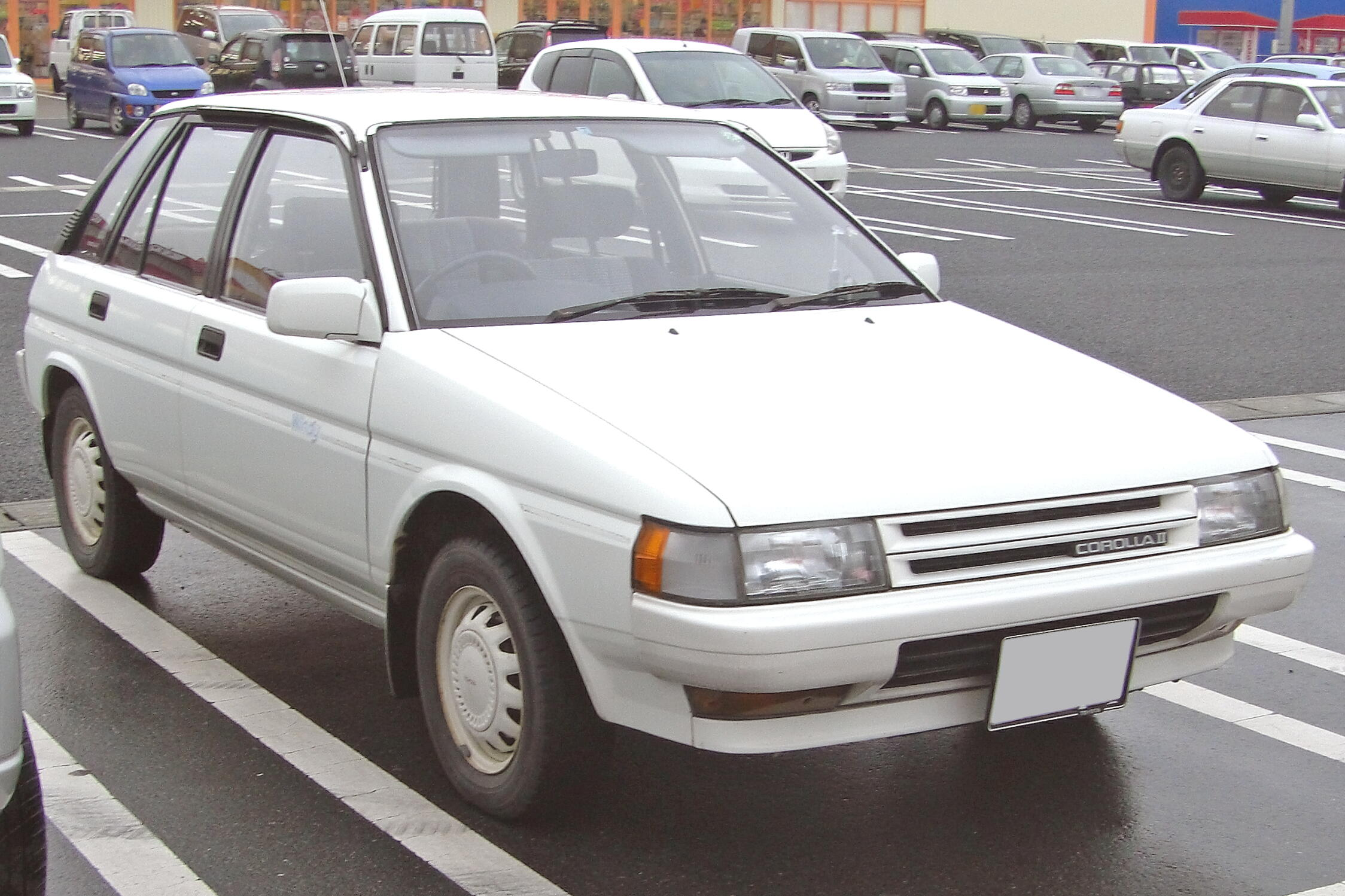
Toyota Corolla II 5-door hatchback (Japan)

== Fourth generation (L40; 1990) ==
Fourth generation (L40)
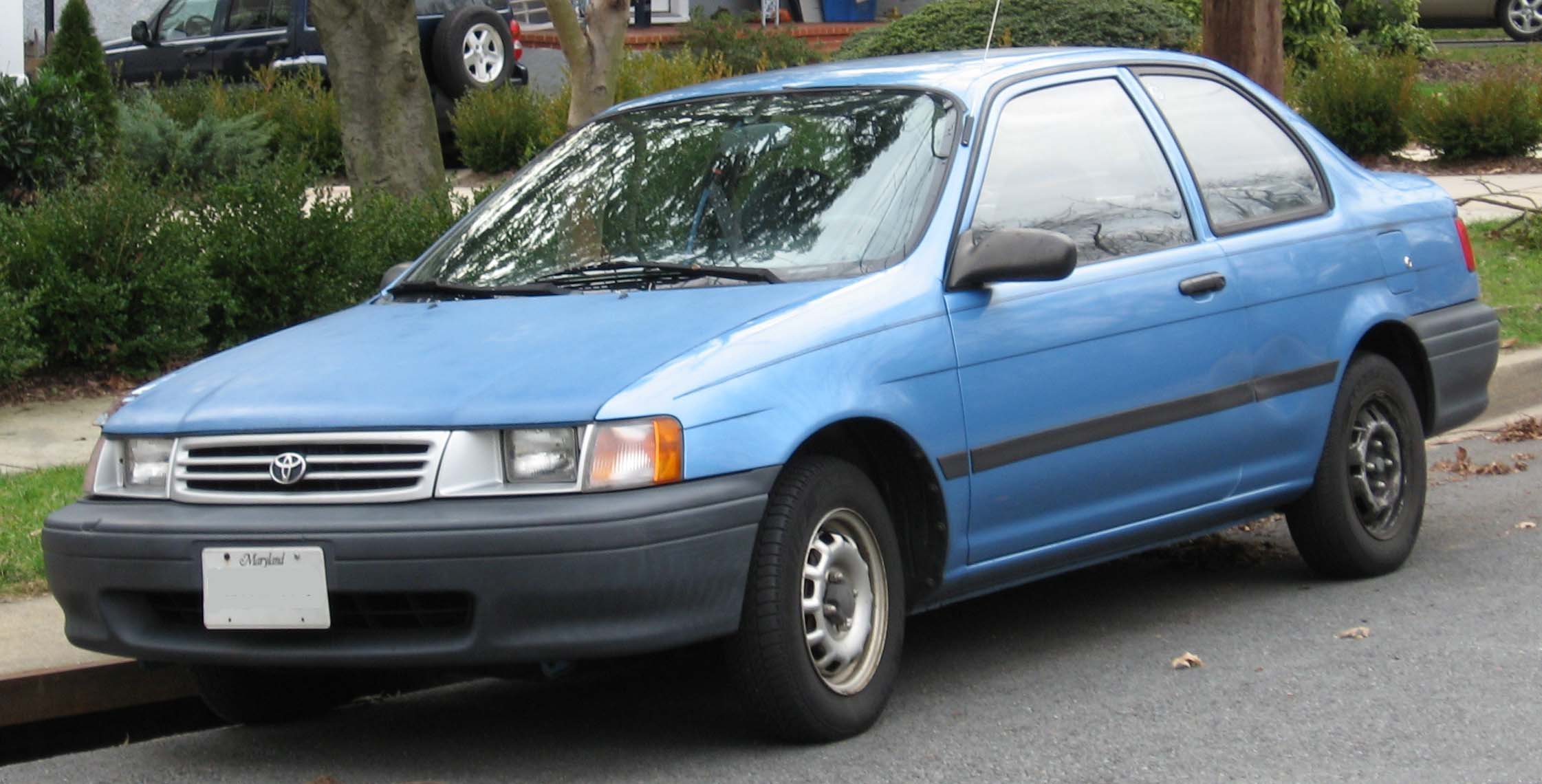
- Pre-facelift Toyota Tercel Standard 2-door (EL42, US)

Overview
- Also called: Toyota Corsa (Japan); Toyota Corolla II (hatchback, Japan); Toyota Corolla Tercel (Chile)
- Production: September 1990–1994

Body and chassis
- Body style: 3-door hatchback; 2/4-door sedan
- Layout: Transverse front-engine, front-wheel-drive
- Related: Toyota Paseo; Toyota Starlet

Powertrain
- Engine: 1295 cc 2E I4 (EL40); 1331 cc 4E-FE I4 (EL41); 1456 cc 3E-E I4 (EL42); 1496 cc 5E-FE/5E-FHE I4 (EL43); 1453 cc 1N-T turbo-diesel I4 (NL40)
- Transmission: 3-speed automatic; 4/5-speed manual

Dimensions
- Wheelbase: 2,380 mm (94 in)
- Length: 3,930 mm (155 in) (hatchback); 4,110 mm (161.8 in) (sedan)
- Width: 1,645 mm (64.76 in) (hatchback); 1,661 mm (65.4 in) (sedan)
- Height: 1,351 mm (53.2 in) (sedan); 1,365–1,435 mm (53.74–56.49 in) (hatchback)
- Curb weight: 914 kg (2,015 lb)

Toyota introduced the fourth-generation Tercel in September 1990. Body styles are 3-door hatchback, 2-door sedan, and 4-door sedan. In the North American markets it was powered by either a 1.5 L 3E-E four-cylinder engine producing 82 hp (61 kW) at 5,200 rpm and 89 lb⋅ft (121 N⋅m) of torque at 4,400 rpm, or a 1.5-litre 5E-FE 16-valve DOHC 4-cylinder engine producing 110 hp (82 kW). The hatchback was not offered in North America, while the two-door sedan was not sold in any market outside of the US and Canada. The rear of the hatchback had an unusual, rounded design, with a large wraparound windshield which was curved in three dimensions.

For the Japanese market, the Tercel 3-door hatchback was offered in VC, VS, VZ, Joinus and Avenue trim levels. Model grades for the sedan were Joinus, Avenue, VE, VX and VZ. The top-of-the-line VZ is powered by a 5E-FHE engine. The Joinus hatchback and sedan, Avenue and VX sedan were also offered with 1.5-litre 1N diesel engine. The 4WD models were available as Joinus and VS hatchbacks, as well as the Avenue and VX sedans. 4WD models were all powered by the 1.5-liter 5E-FE engine. The higher level Japanese sedans have different tail lights and a better-equipped interior than the export models. This was the first Tercel to offer anti-lock brakes.

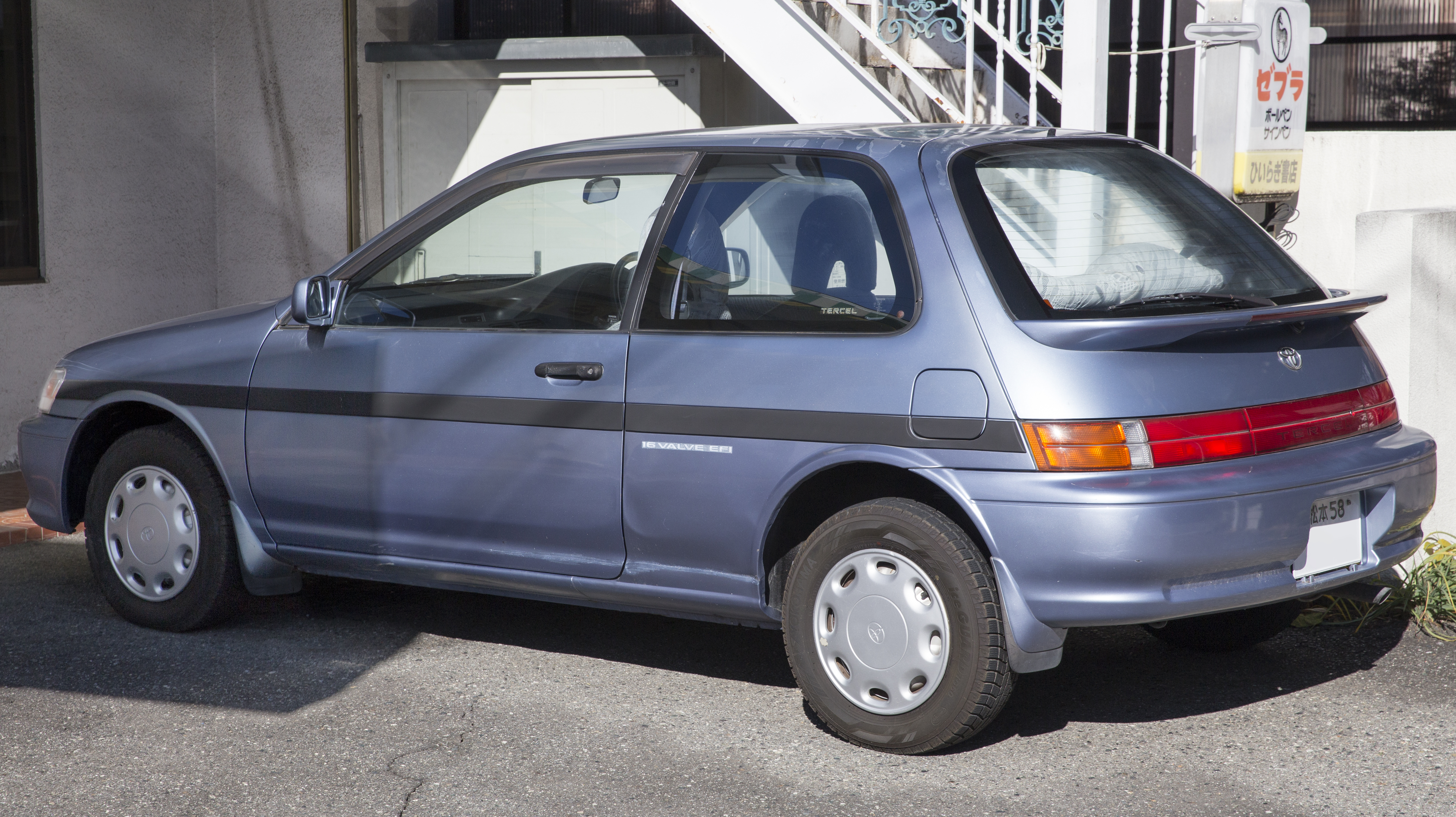
Facelift Tercel VZ hatchback, rear view (EL43, JDM)

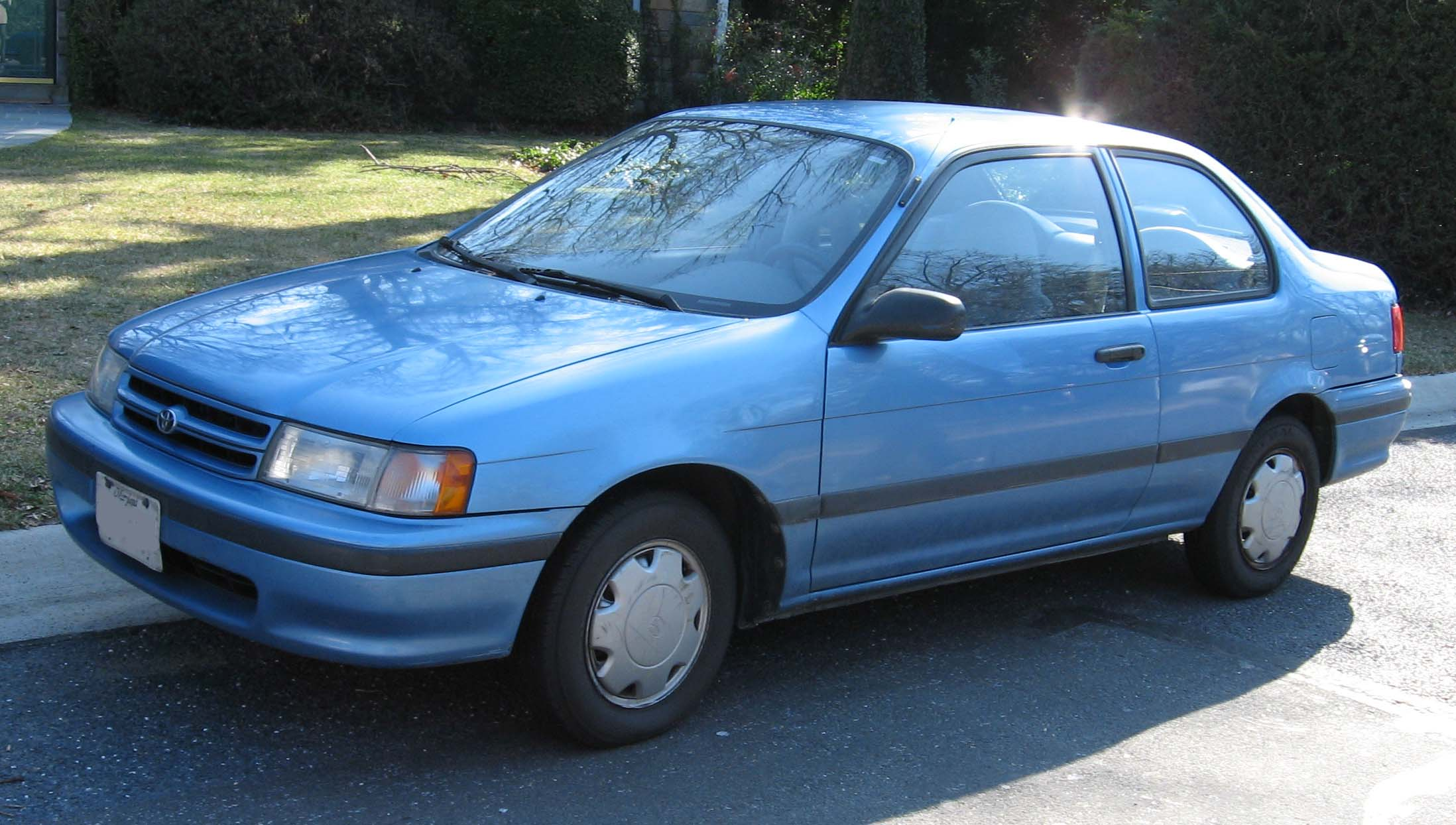
Facelift Toyota Tercel DX 2-door (EL42, US)

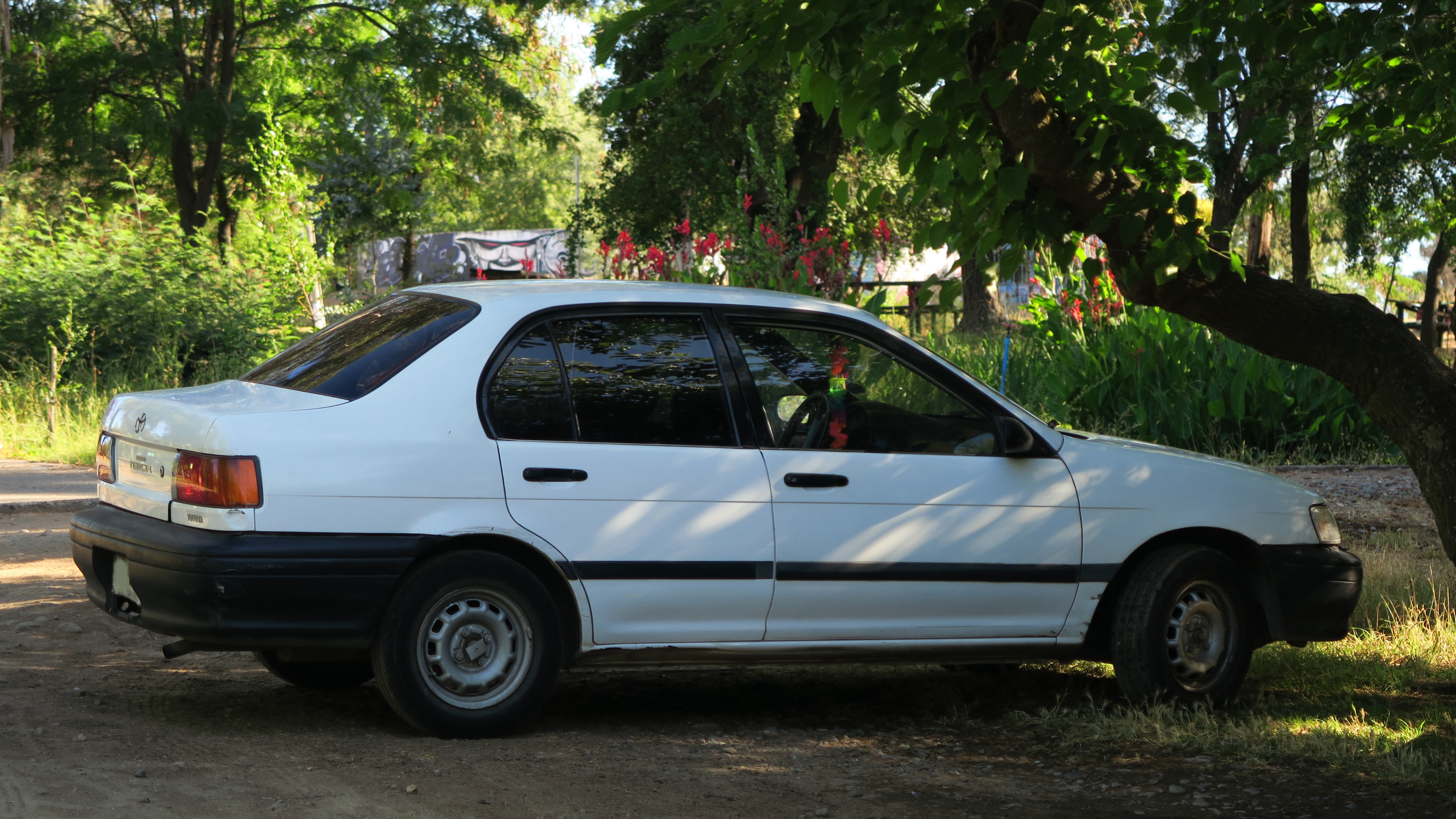
Pre-facelift model Tercel 1.3 DX sedan (EL40, Chile)

=== Export models ===
North America

North American models were the 2-door base, 2 and 4-door DX, and 4-door LE. The hatchback was no longer offered for this region. Colour-keyed bumpers, full wheel covers and folded rear seat were optional on the DX, standard on the LE. The LE has red trunk garnish similar to the Japanese model.

Facelift was given for the 1993 model year with a restyled grille and the addition of a standard driver's side airbag The driver-side now has 3-point seatbelt, but the passenger-side retained the non-motorized two-point passive passenger-side seatbelt with manuallap belt. ABS (anti-lock brakes) was optional. The Tercel was carried over to 1994 with no major changes aside from changing over to haloalkane, a non-CFC refrigerant, for the air conditioning system.

South America

In Chile, the Tercel was introduced in 1991 as a four-door sedan with a 1.3-litre, SOHC 12-valve 78 hp (57 kW), four-cylinder, carburetor engine, under the name "Corolla Tercel". The "DX" basic version came with tachometer and four spoke steering wheel. It gained moderate success, helped by the recognition of the Corolla name.

In September 1992, a Canadian-spec version was introduced to Chile to replace the previous one with a new 1.5-litre SOHC engine. Unlike the previous one, it was simply called "Tercel". It was brought along the Canadian-spec Corolla to meet the new emission standard since no Latin American version of either was yet available with a catalytic converter. Due to the higher trim level of the Canadian-spec versions, the Tercel was initially marketed as a successor of the Corolla E90, which had just been discontinued.

=== Gallery ===
Corsa

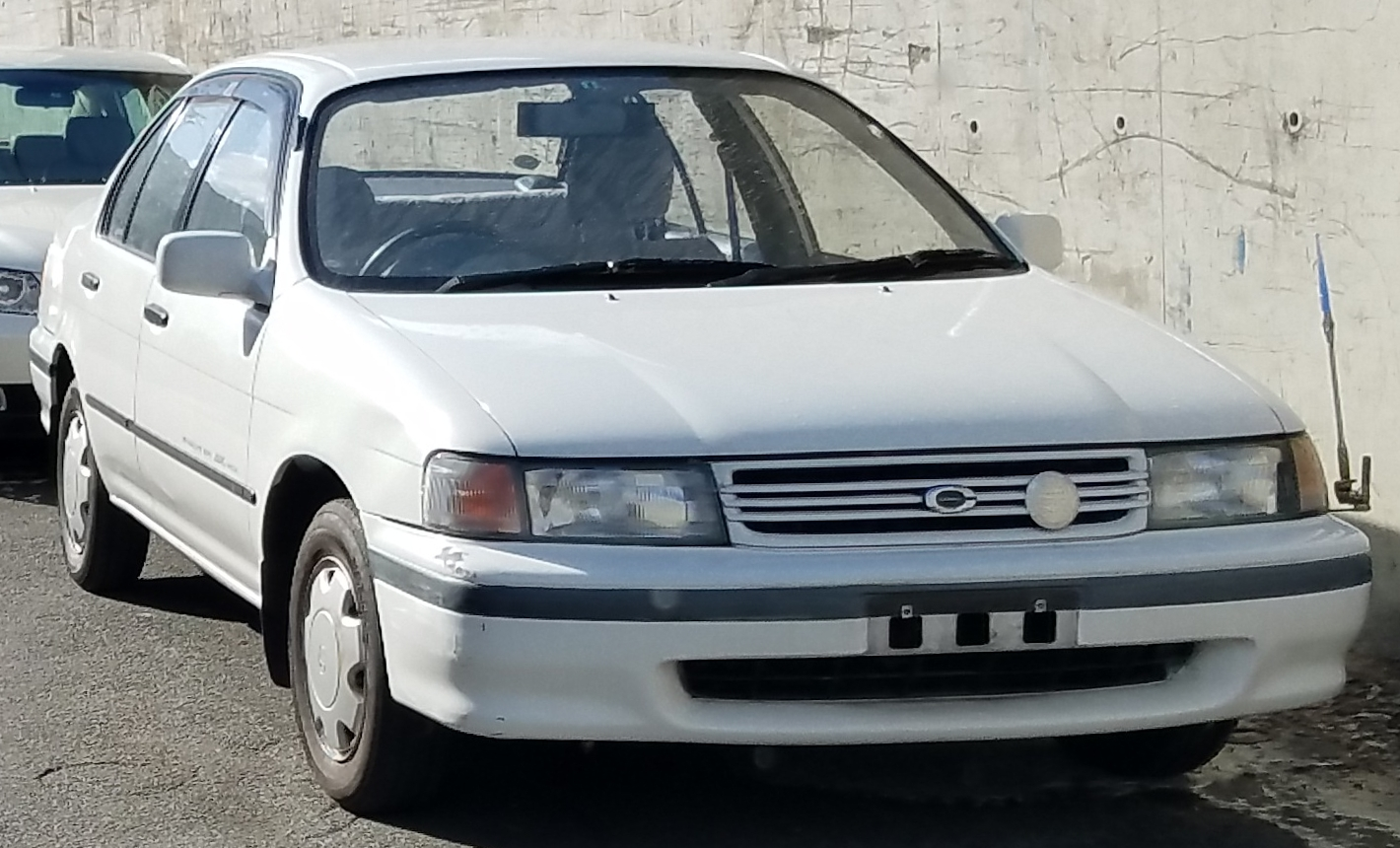
Pre-facelift Toyota Corsa 1.3 AX Special (EL41, Japan)

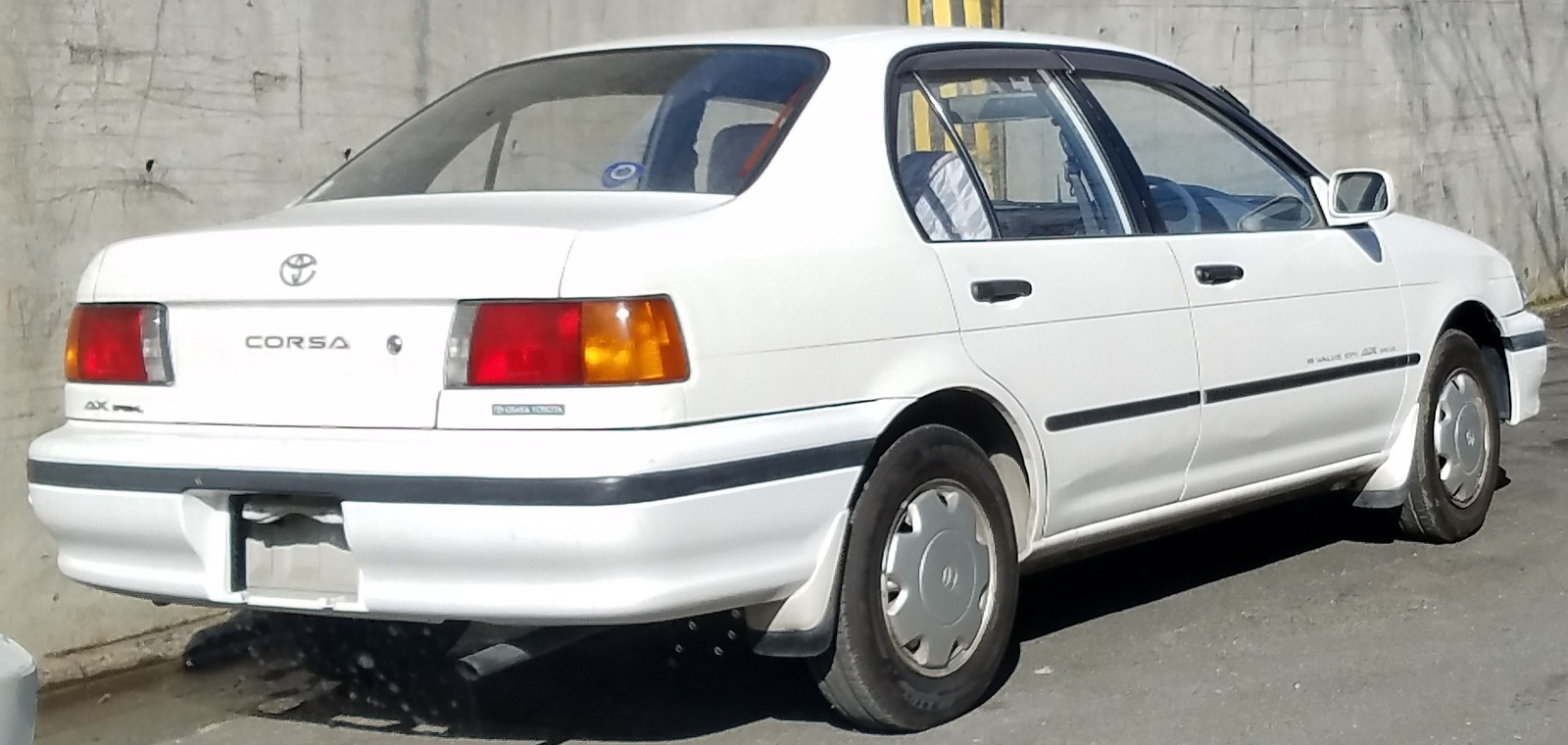
Pre-facelift Toyota Corsa 1.3 AX Special (EL41, Japan)

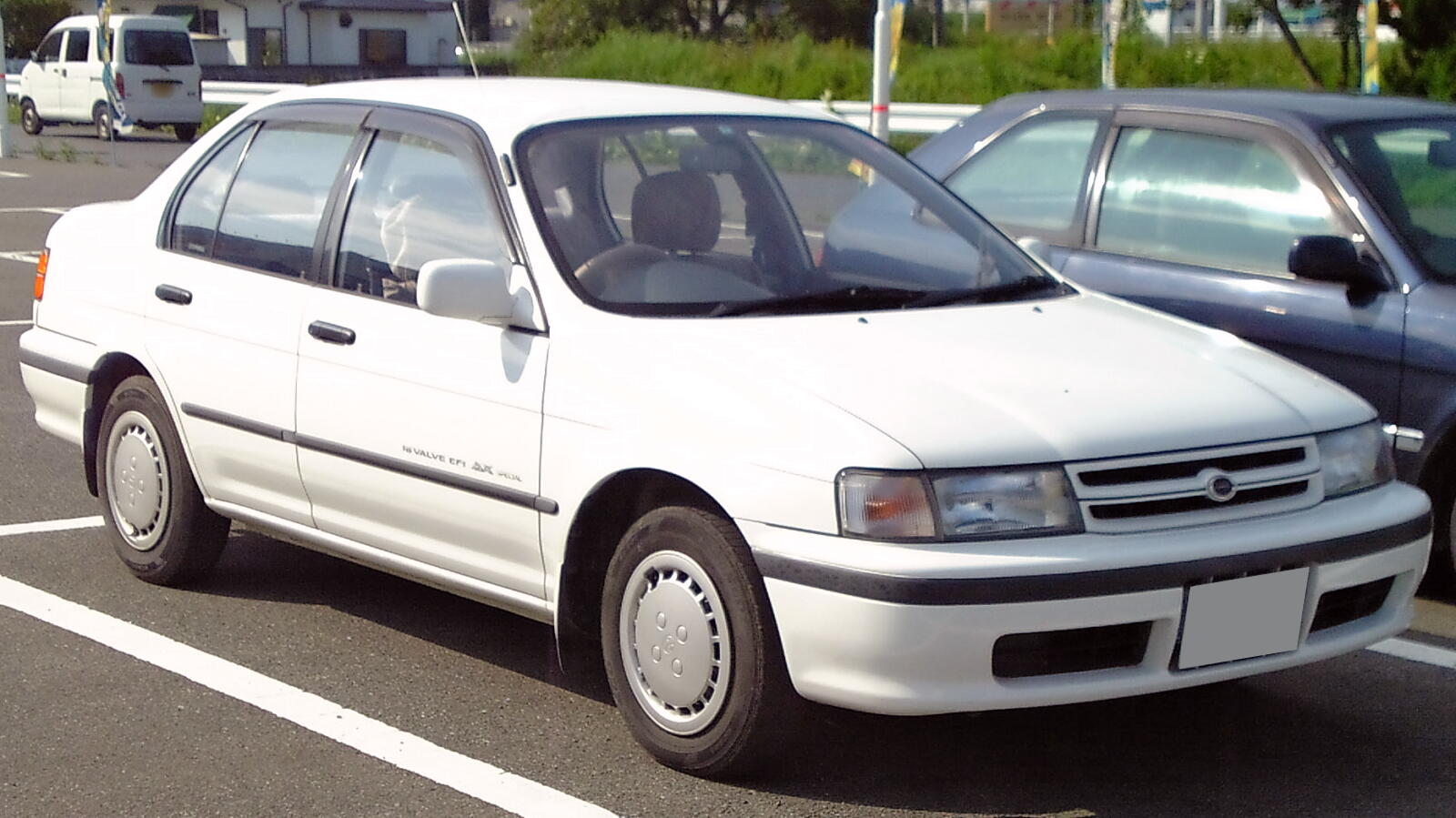
Facelift Toyota Corsa sedan (Japan)

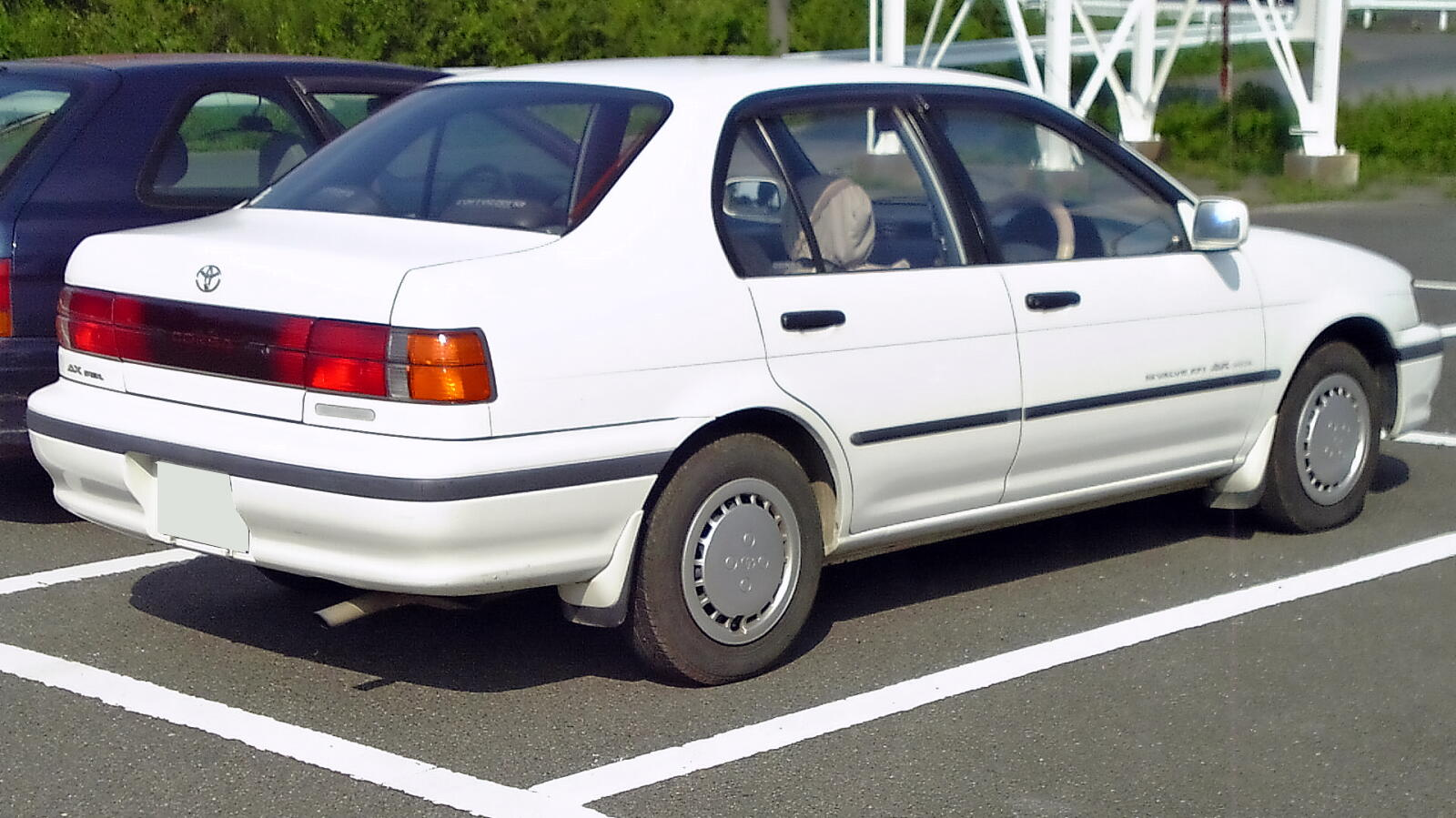
Facelift Toyota Corsa sedan (Japan)

Corolla II

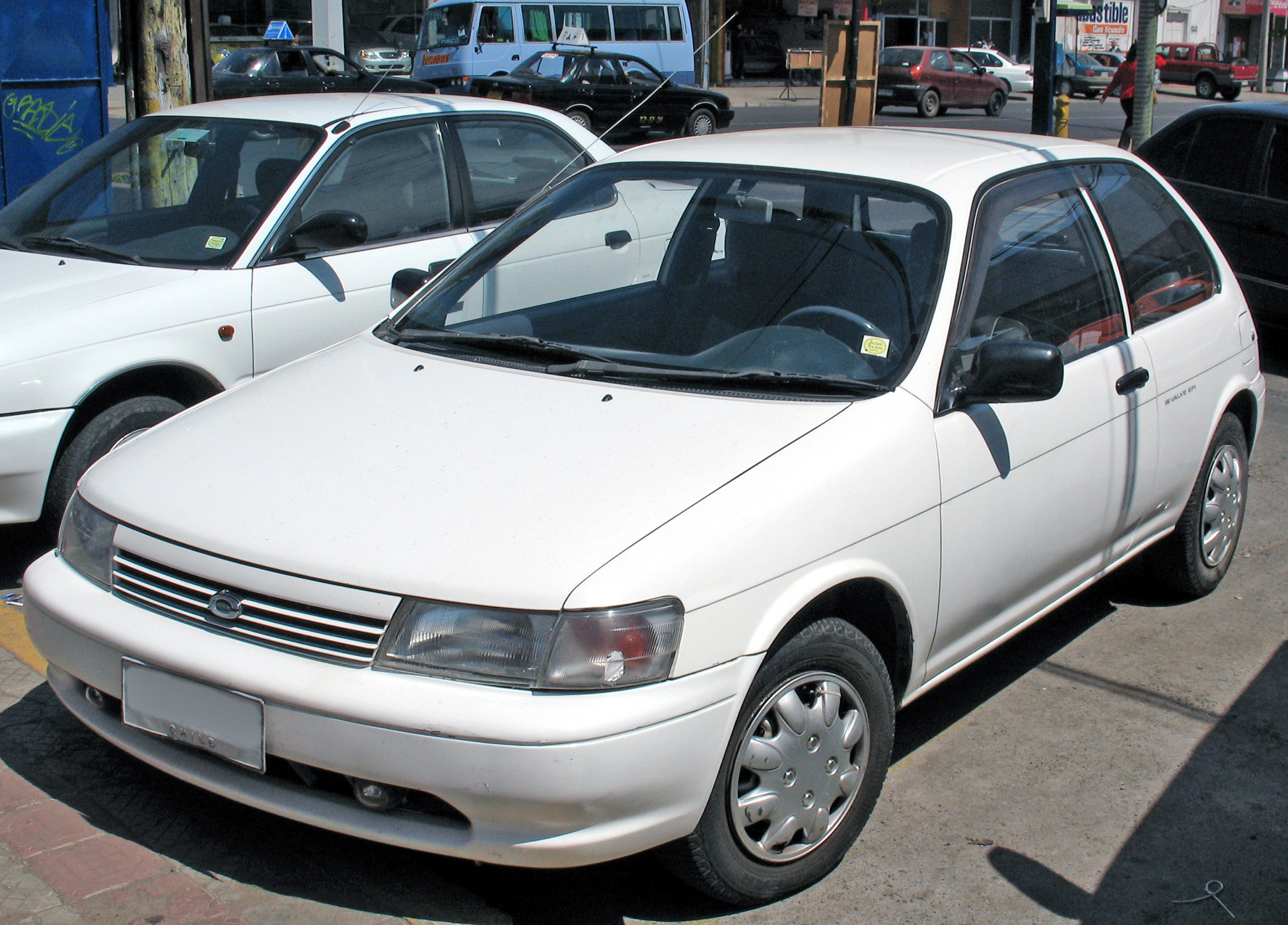
Pre-facelift Corolla II 1.3 TX hatchback (EL41)

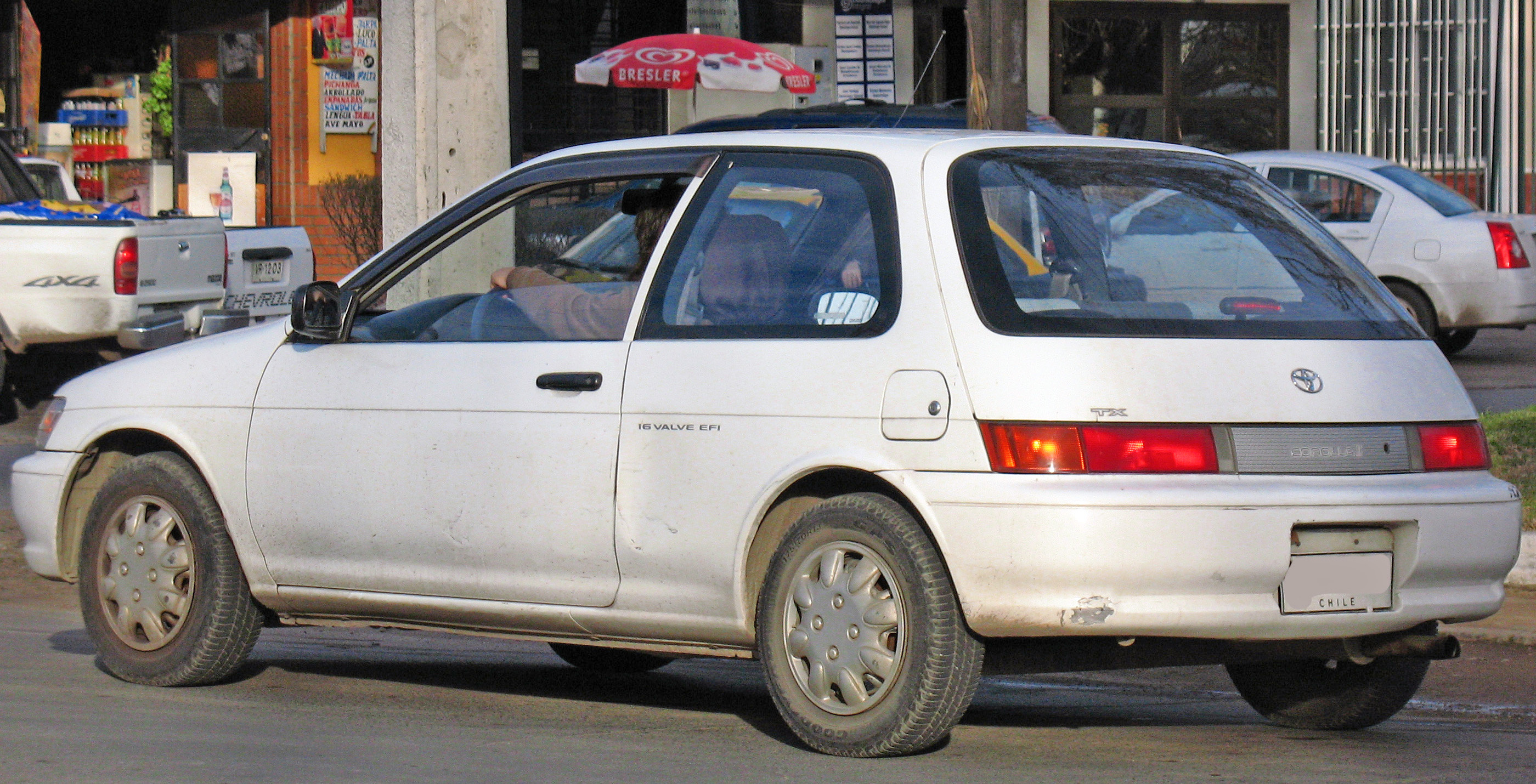
Pre-facelift Corolla II 1.3 TX hatchback (EL41)

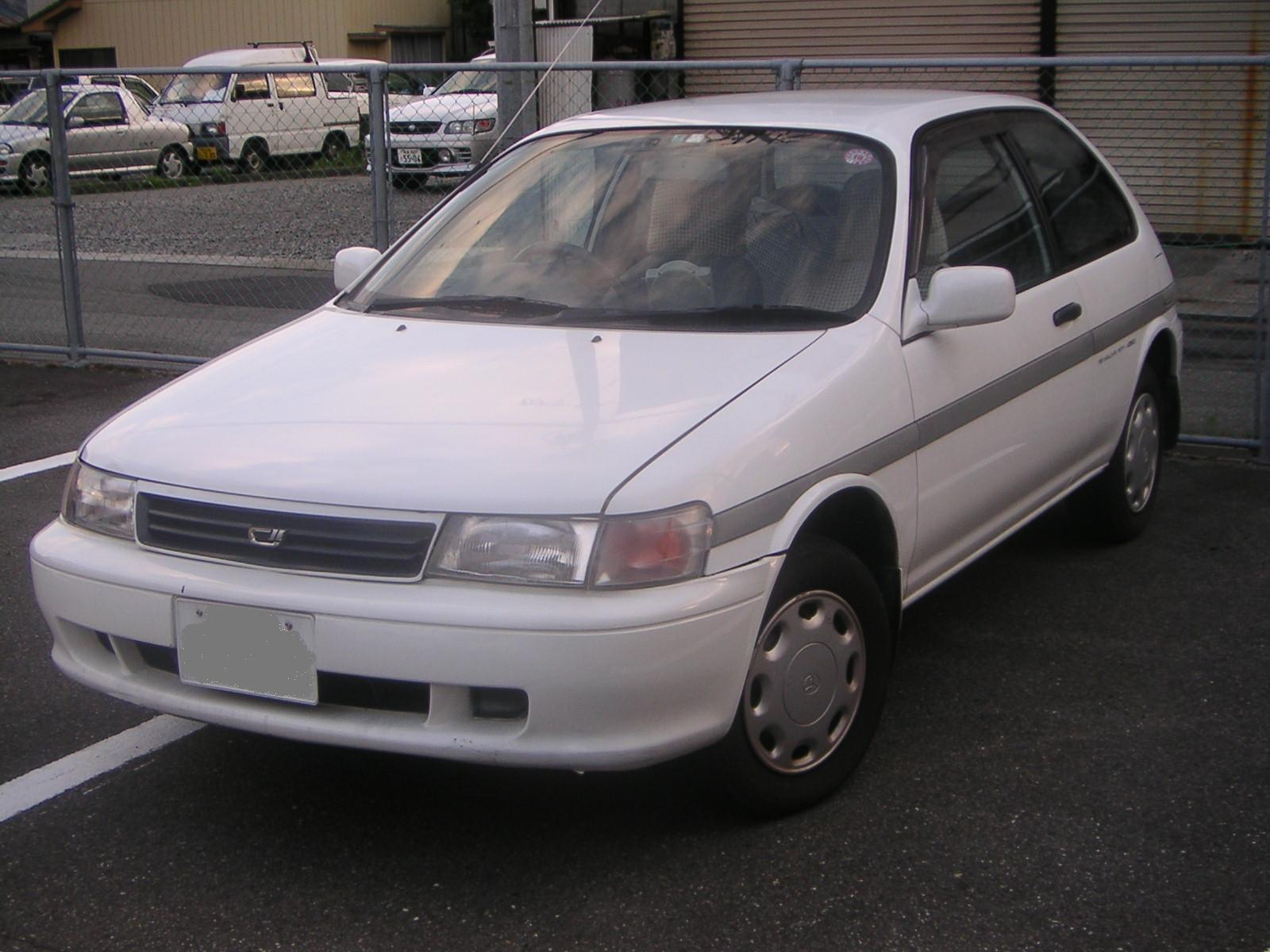
Facelift Corolla II hatchback 4WD (EL45, Japan)

== Fifth generation (L50; 1994) ==
Fifth generation (L50)
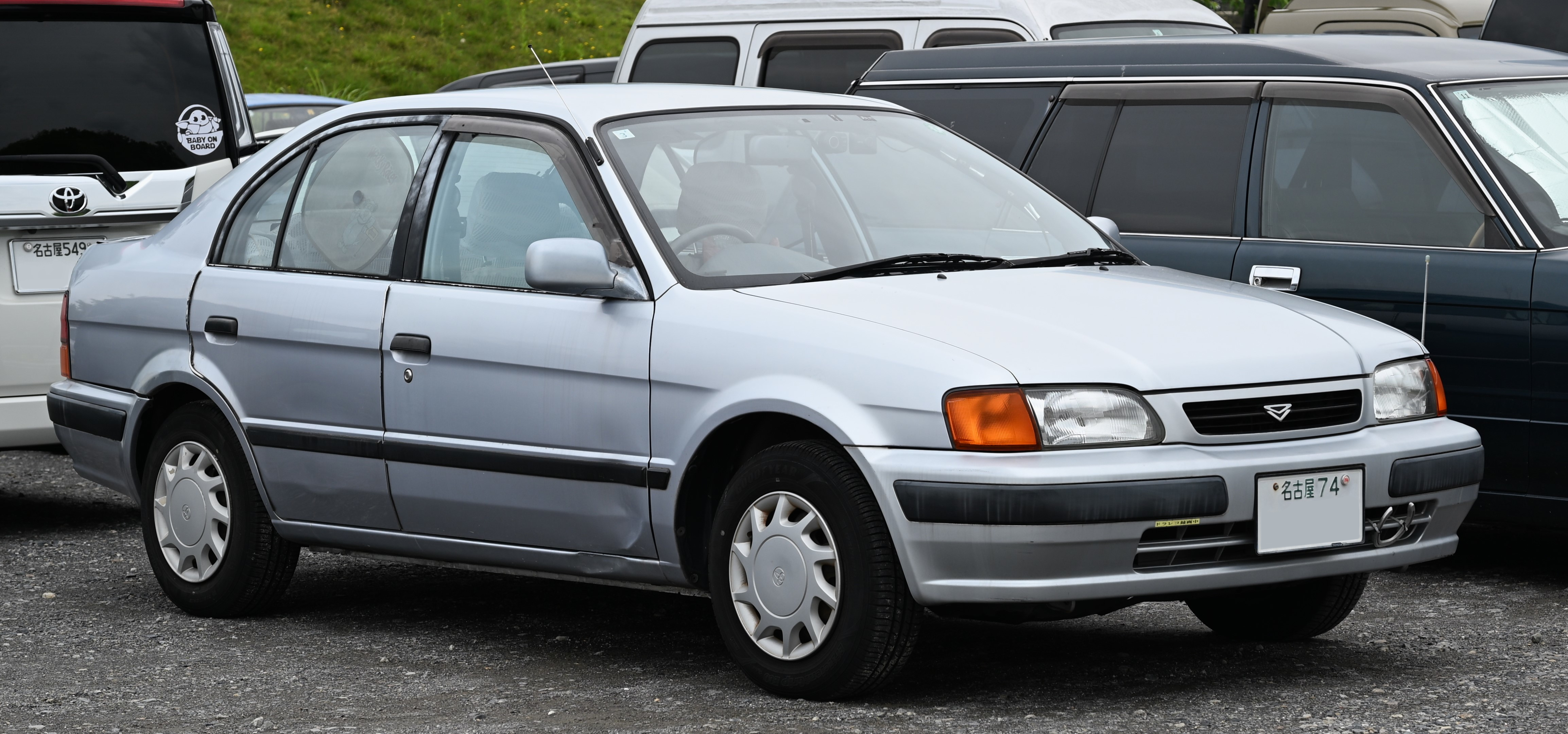
- 1994 Toyota Tercel (pre-facelift; Japan)

Overview
- Also called: Toyota Corsa (Japan); Toyota Corolla II (hatchback, Japan); Toyota Soluna (sedan, South-East Asia)
- Production: September 1994 – July 1999; August 1996 – April 2003 (Thailand)
- Assembly: Japan: Toyota, Aichi (Takaoka plant); Taiwan: Zhongli (until 2003); Thailand: Chachoengsao (TMT, Soluna); Indonesia: Karawang (TAM, Soluna)
- Designer: Yasuhisa Hamano (1992); Shinichi Hiranaka (1992)

Body and chassis
- Body style: 2/4-door sedan; 3-door hatchback
- Layout: Transverse front-engine, front-wheel-drive
- Related: Toyota Paseo; Toyota Starlet

Powertrain
- Engine: 1.3 L 2E I4 (Central and South America); 1.3 L 4E-FE I4; 1.5 L 5E-FE I4; 1.5 L 5A-FE I4 (Soluna); 1.5 L 1N-T I4 (turbo-diesel)
- Transmission: 4- or 5-speed manual; 3- or 4-speed automatic

Dimensions
- Wheelbase: 2,380 mm (93.7 in)
- Length: 3,915 mm (154.13 in) (hatchback); 4,120 mm (162.2 in) (1995–97; sedan); 4,133 mm (162.7 in) (1998–99; sedan); 4,175 mm (164.37 in) (Soluna)
- Width: 1,646 mm (64.8 in) (1998–99; sedan); 1,660 mm (65.35 in) (hatchback); 1,661 mm (65.4 in) (1995–97; sedan, Soluna)
- Height: 1,351 mm (53.2 in) (sedan); 1,370 mm (53.93 in) (hatchback); 1,380 mm (54.33 in) (Soluna)

Chronology
- Successor: Toyota Vios (Southeast Asia); Toyota Platz (Japan); Toyota Duet (Corolla II, Japan)

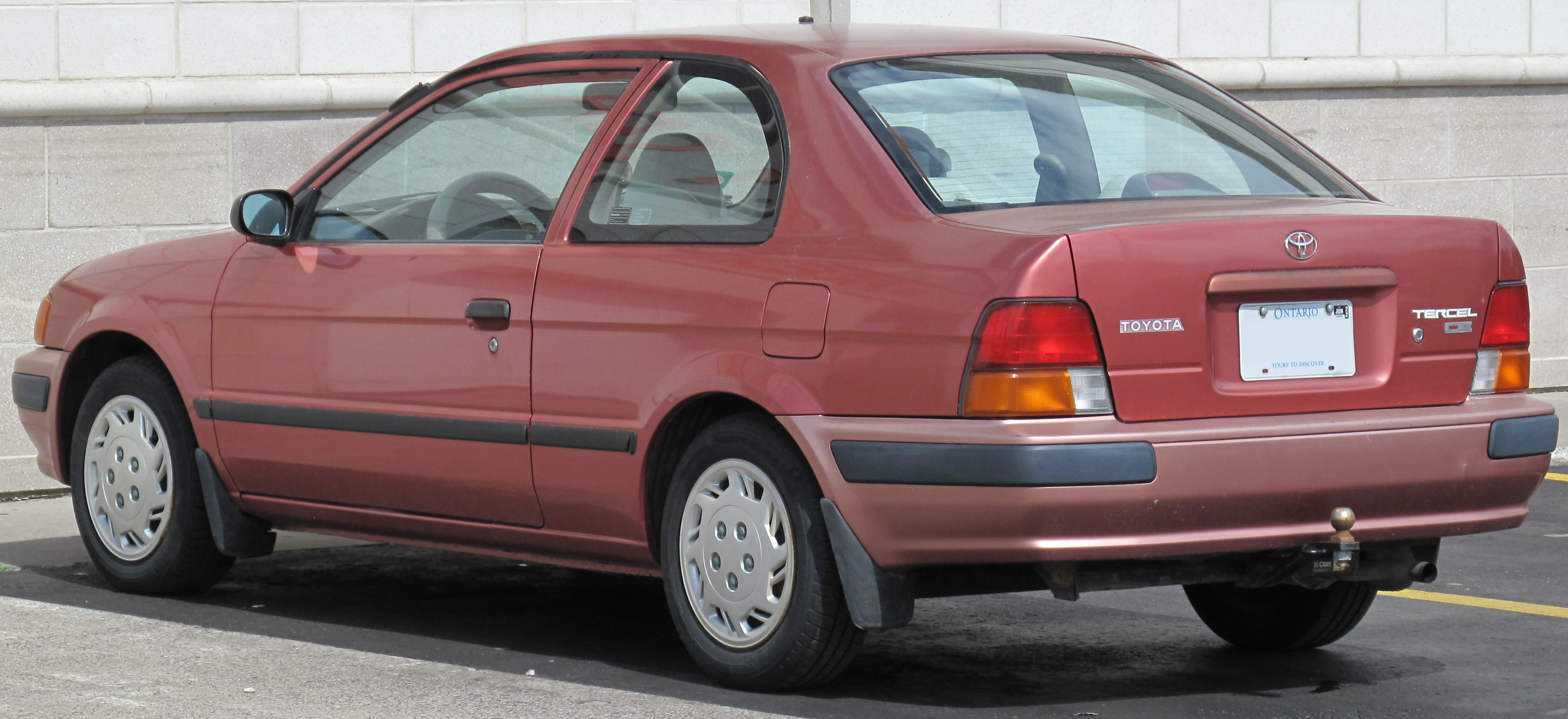
1997 Tercel CE 2-door sedan (EL53, Canada)

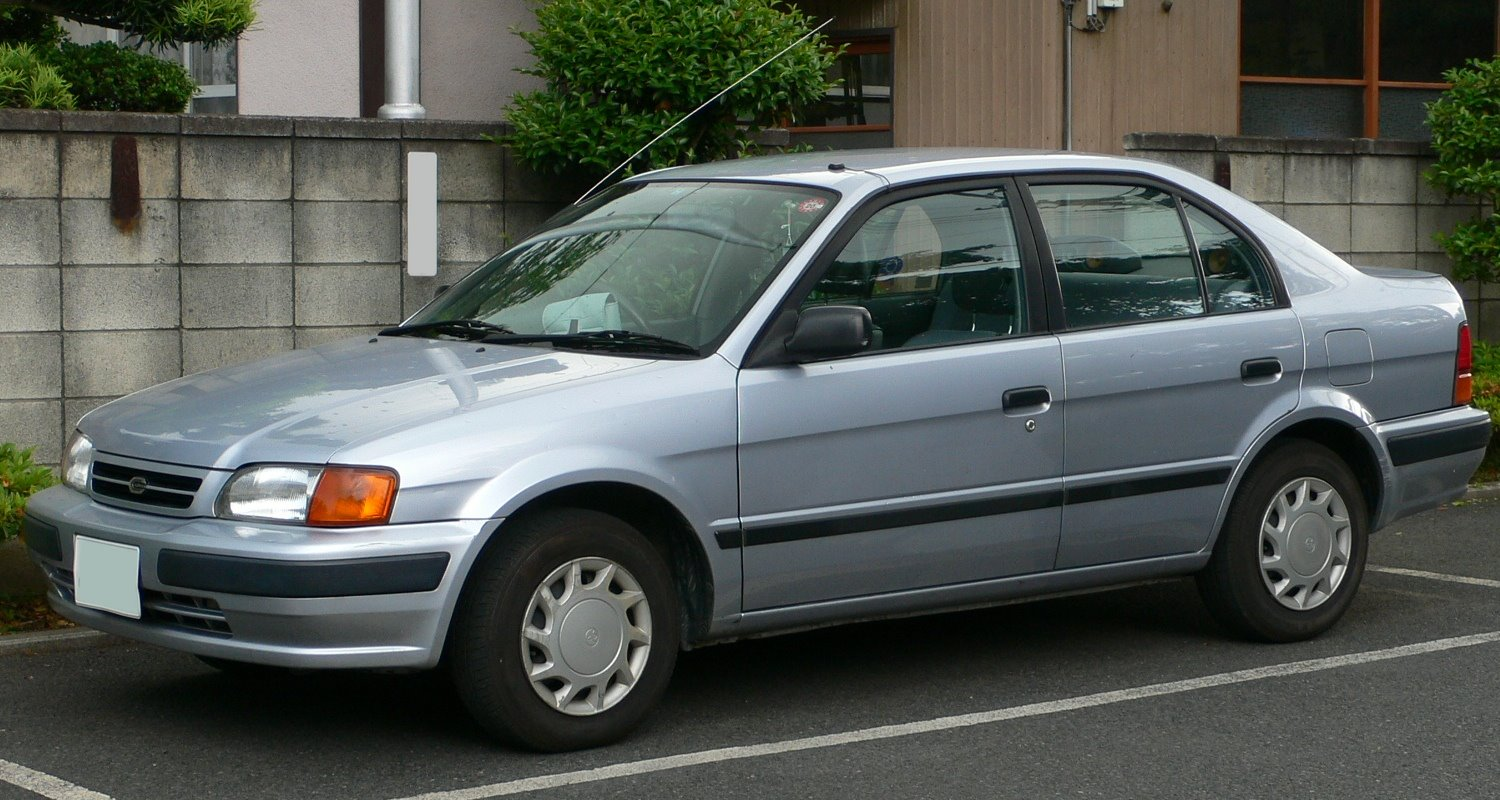
1994 Corsa 4-door sedan (Japan)

Designed between 1991 and 1992 by Shinichi Hiranaka and Yasuhisa Hamano, Toyota introduced an all-new Tercel in September 1994, for the 1995 model year. The new Tercel featured a redesigned exterior and new engine, offering a stiffer body with better handling and was one of only a handful of cars in the US to have OBDII in 1995. Reflecting the state of Japan's post-Bubble economy, the car was somewhat decontented in comparison to its overbuilt predecessor. The Tercel now offered standard driver's and passenger's side airbags in the United States, but only a driver's side bag for Canada. Three-point seatbelts for front and outboard rear passengers and adjustable shoulder-belt anchor points for front seat passengers were installed on four-door models. All models met federal standards for 1997 side-impact protection, and offered anti-lock brakes. Standard models came with only a four-speed manual or automatic transmission and grey bumpers, while DX models were offered with the addition of body-coloured bumpers and either a five-speed manual or four-speed automatic transmission.

Its all-new appearance appears to be influenced by the Japanese-market Toyota Camry V40 series, also introduced that year. Both vehicles were available together at Toyota Corolla Store Japanese dealerships. Design patents were filed at the Japan Patent Office on 12 October 1992, under patent number 1009387.

In Japan, the Tercel was again also offered with the Corsa and Corolla II nameplates, for sale through parallel marketing channels. There was also a three-door hatchback body version offered in addition to the four-door sedan. The two-door sedan was only ever marketed in North America. There was also a four-wheel-drive option available in Japan.

The interior design pushed the dash further away, but brought the switches closer. This same dashboard (left sided version) was shared with the Toyota Starlet and Toyota Paseo of the time. The all-new DOHC 1.5 L inline-four engine provides 93 hp (69 kW) and 100 lb⋅ft (140 N⋅m) of torque, offering a 13 percent power increase over the previous generation as well as a 15 percent increase in fuel economy. The new 5E-FE engine gets 45 mpg_{‑US} (5.2 L/100 km; 54 mpg_{‑imp}) on the highway with a five-speed manual transmission, making it the most fuel-efficient four-cylinder car of its time in the United States. As Toyota's entry-level car, the Tercel was also available with the smaller, 1.3-litre, 4E-FE and 2E petrol four-cylinder, and the Toyota 1N-T engine; a 1,453 cc inline-four turbocharged diesel engine which provided 67 PS (49 kW) at 4,200 rpm and 137 N⋅m (101 lb⋅ft) of torque at 2,600 rpm.

For 1997, all North American market Tercels were available only in the CE trim level and incorporated many of the standard and optional items from previous base and DX models. All Tercels came standard with a new 13-inch wheel and tire combination.

Inside, the Tercel's dashboard was revised with rotary ventilation controls. All Toyota models had revised seat fabric and door panels. The RedHawk and WhiteHawk editions were introduced in addition to the BlackHawk trim already offered, which came standard with air conditioning, 185/60R14 tires on custom wheels, a rear spoiler with integrated brake light, and hawk symbols to identify the special model.

=== Facelift ===
For 1998, the Tercel's styling was updated, highlighted by multi-reflector headlights, a revised grille and front fascia design and clear lens turn signal lights for the front and rear. The facelift occurred in December 1997 for the Japanese market, and covered all two deritative models (Corsa, and Corolla II).

The Tercel's rear styling was also enhanced with redesigned composite tail lights and updated bumper molding. The new molding extended across the entire length of the rear bumper.

Production of the Tercel for the American market ended in 1998 as the model was superseded by the Echo (also as the Platz in Japan). Production for Japan, Canada and some other countries continued through 1999. Taiwanese production continued until 2003.

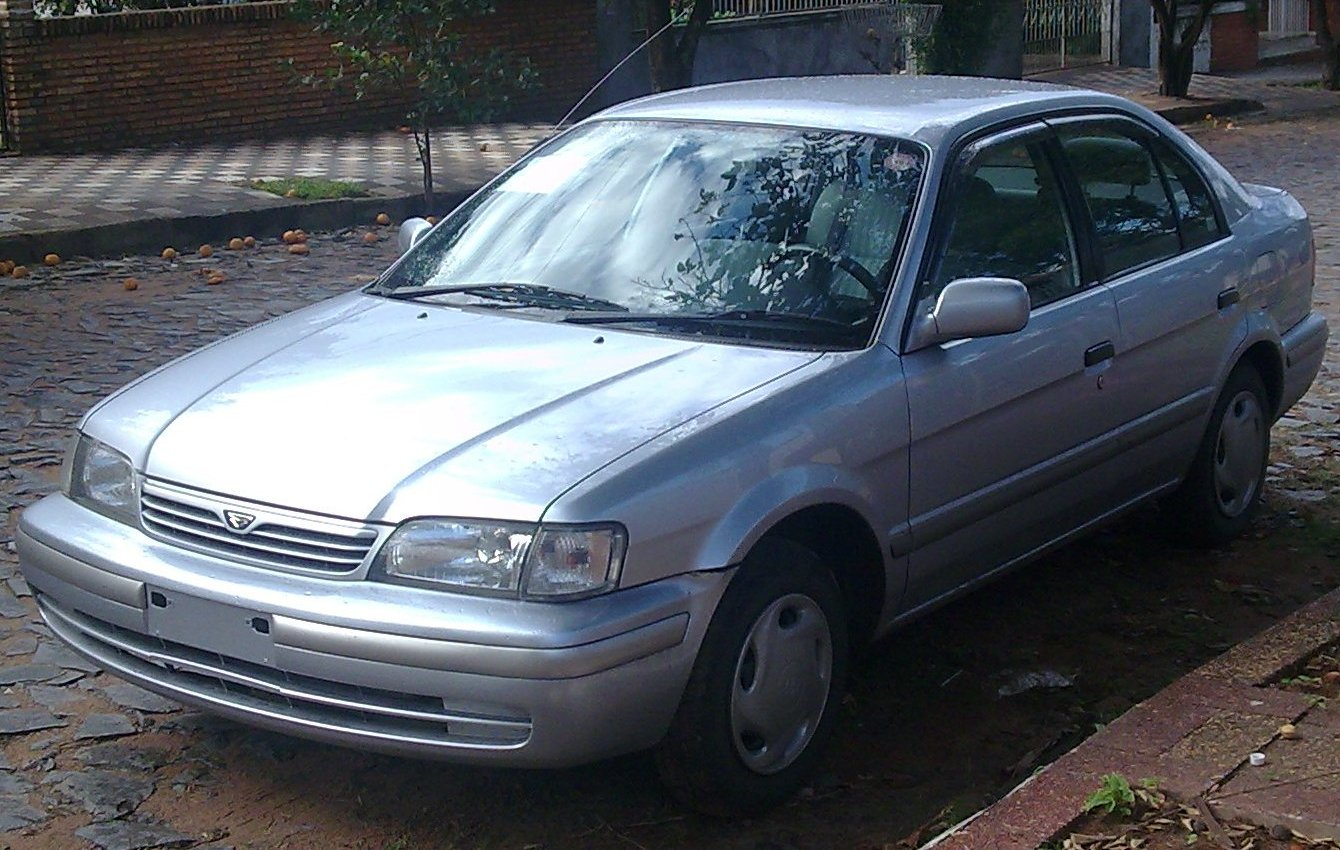
Facelift Toyota Tercel 4-door sedan (Japan)

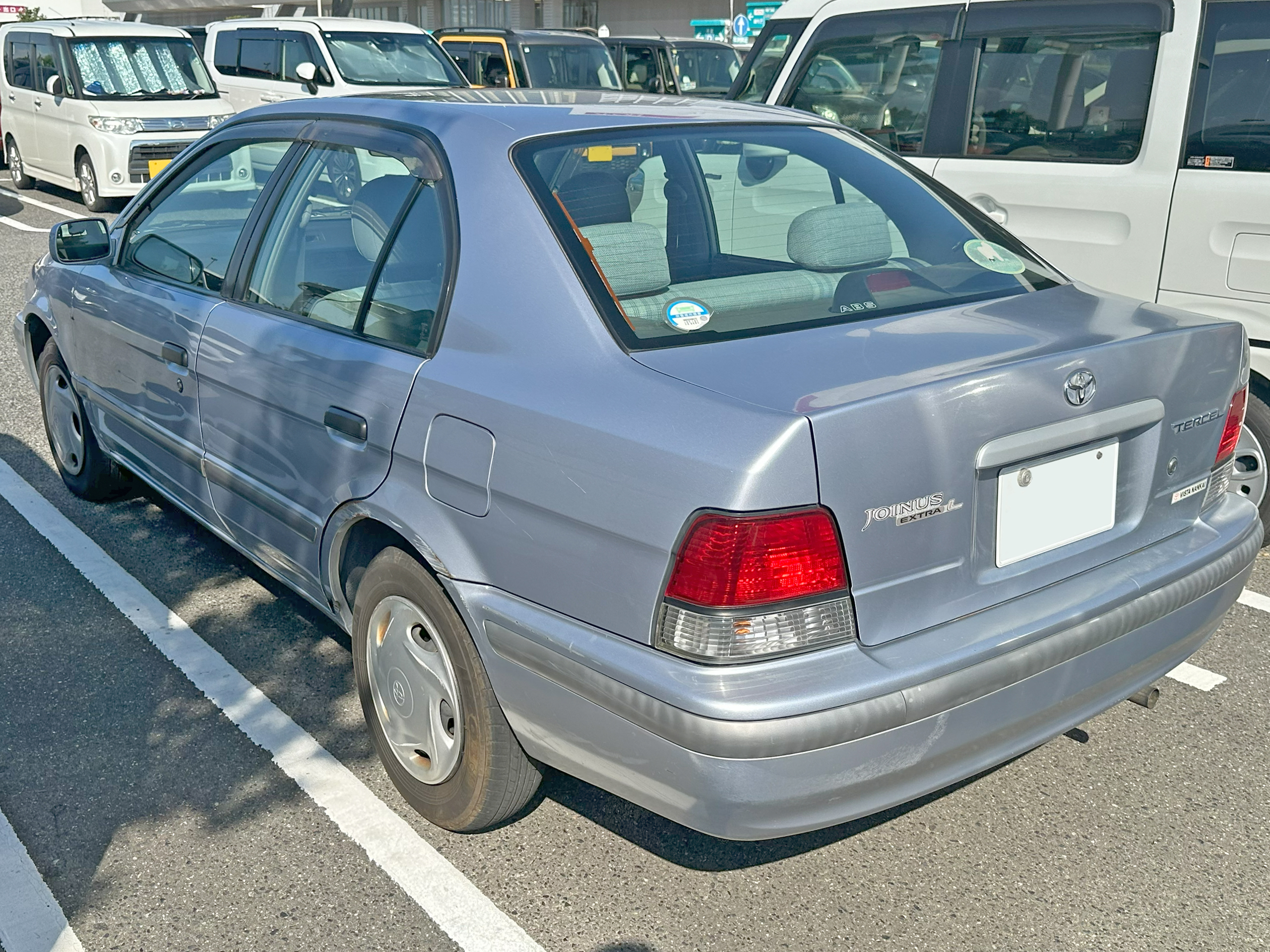
Facelift Tercel 1.3 Joinus Extra L 4-door sedan (EL51, Japan)

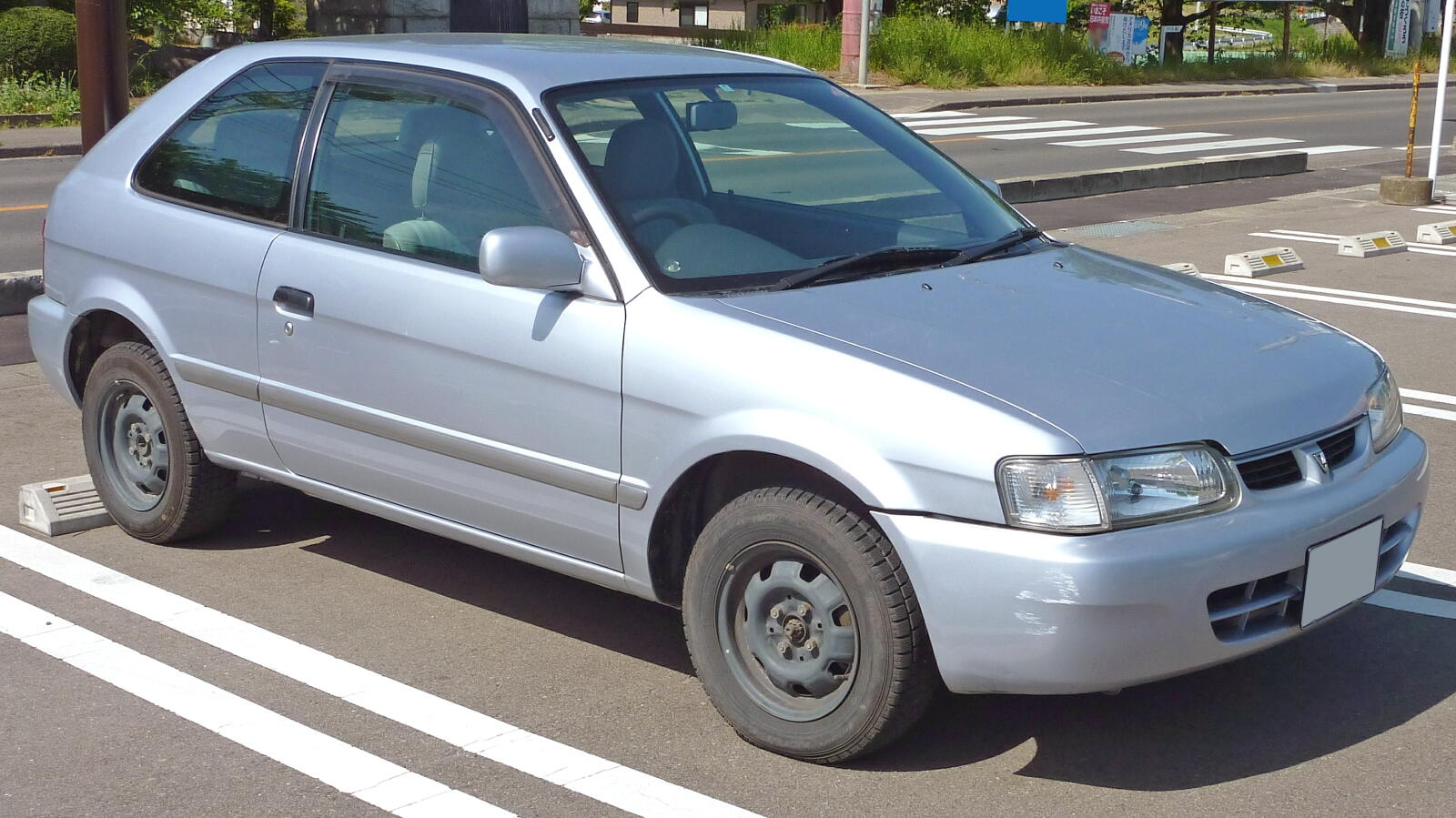
Facelift Corolla II 4WD hatchback (EL55, Japan)

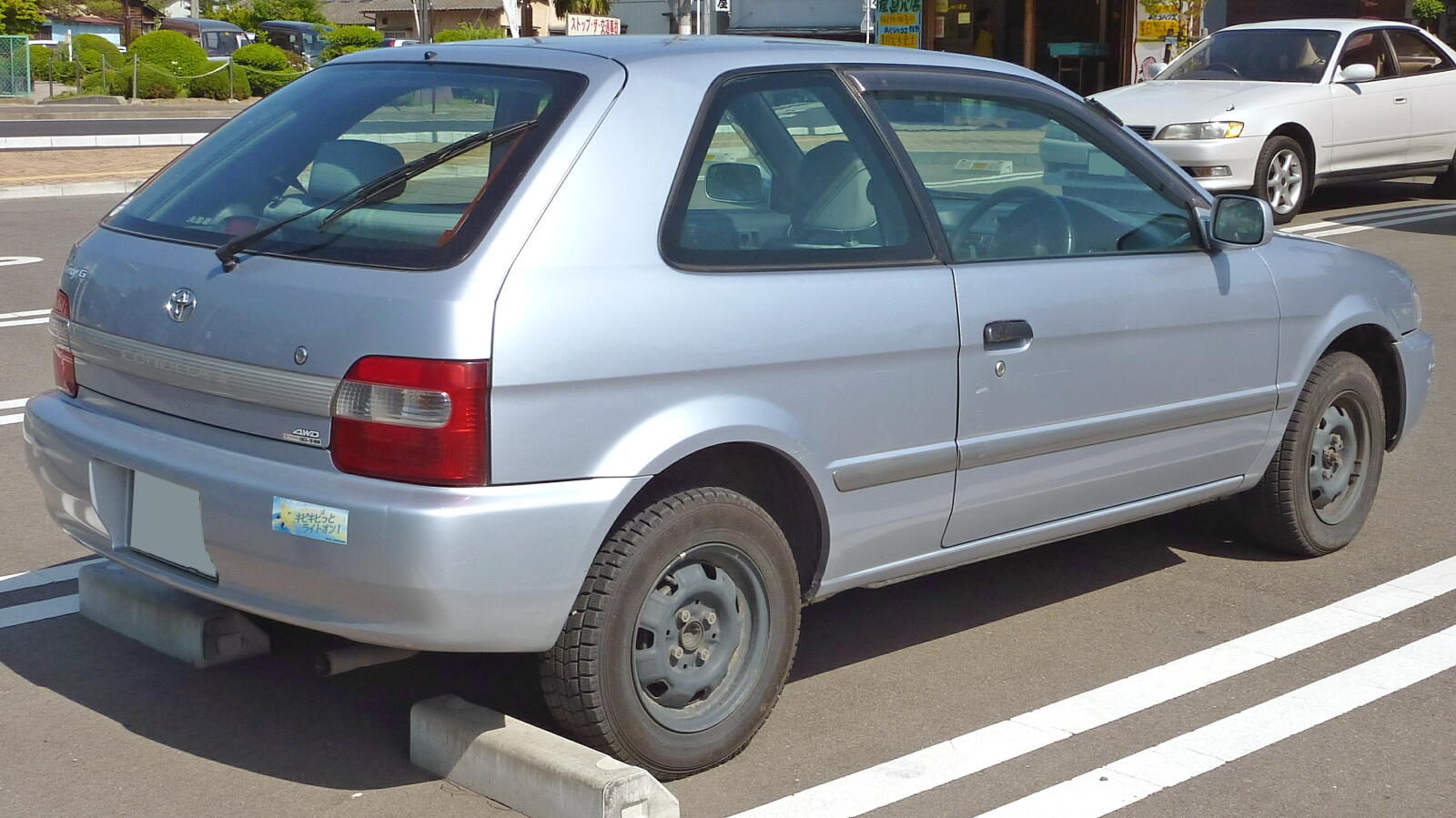
Facelift Corolla II 4WD hatchback (EL55, Japan)

=== Markets ===
==== Taiwan ====
The Tercel was also sold in Taiwan, where it was manufactured and assembled by Kuozui Motors.

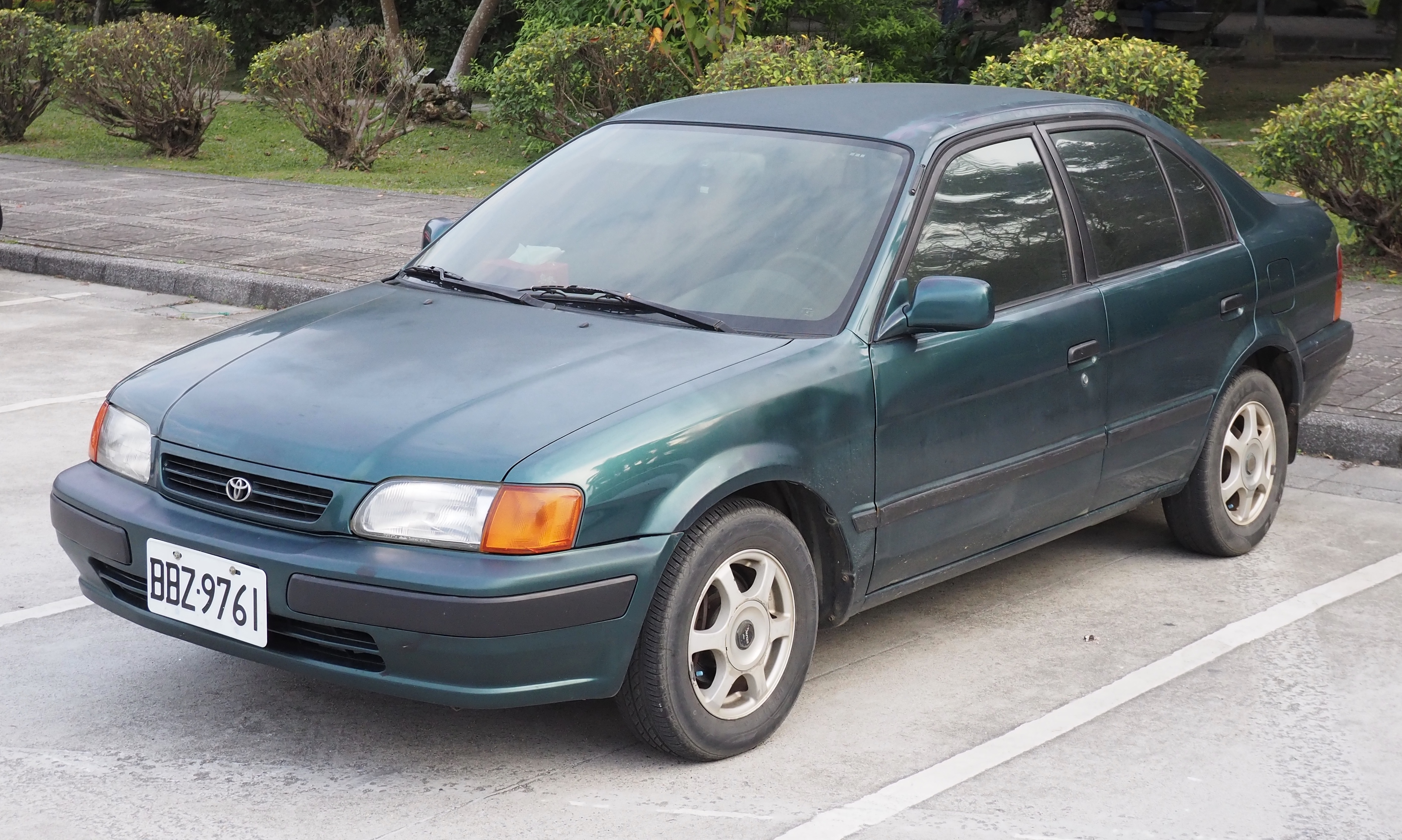
Toyota Tercel (AL50; pre-facelift, Taiwan)

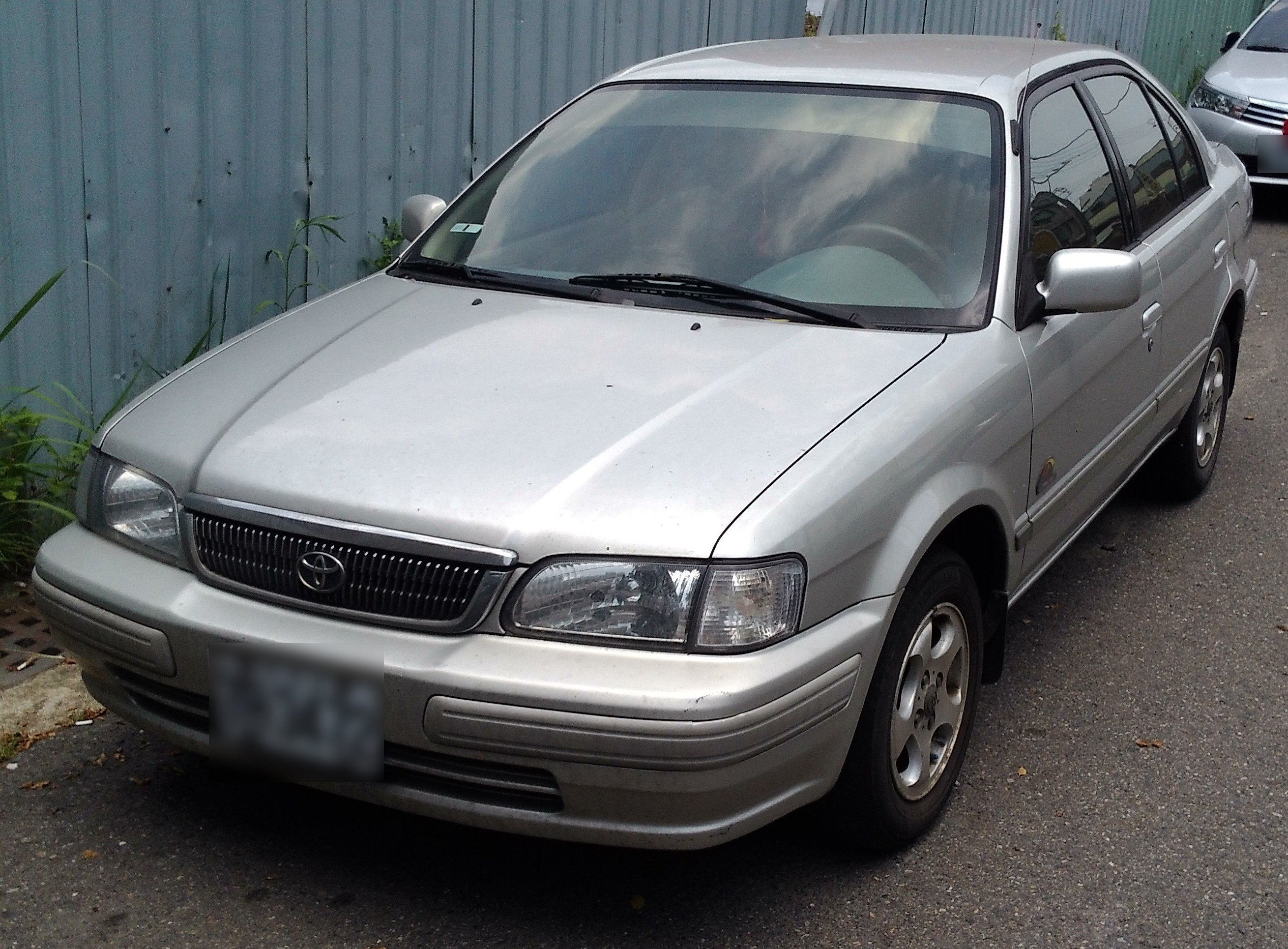
Toyota Tercel 1.5 CL (AL50; facelift, Taiwan)

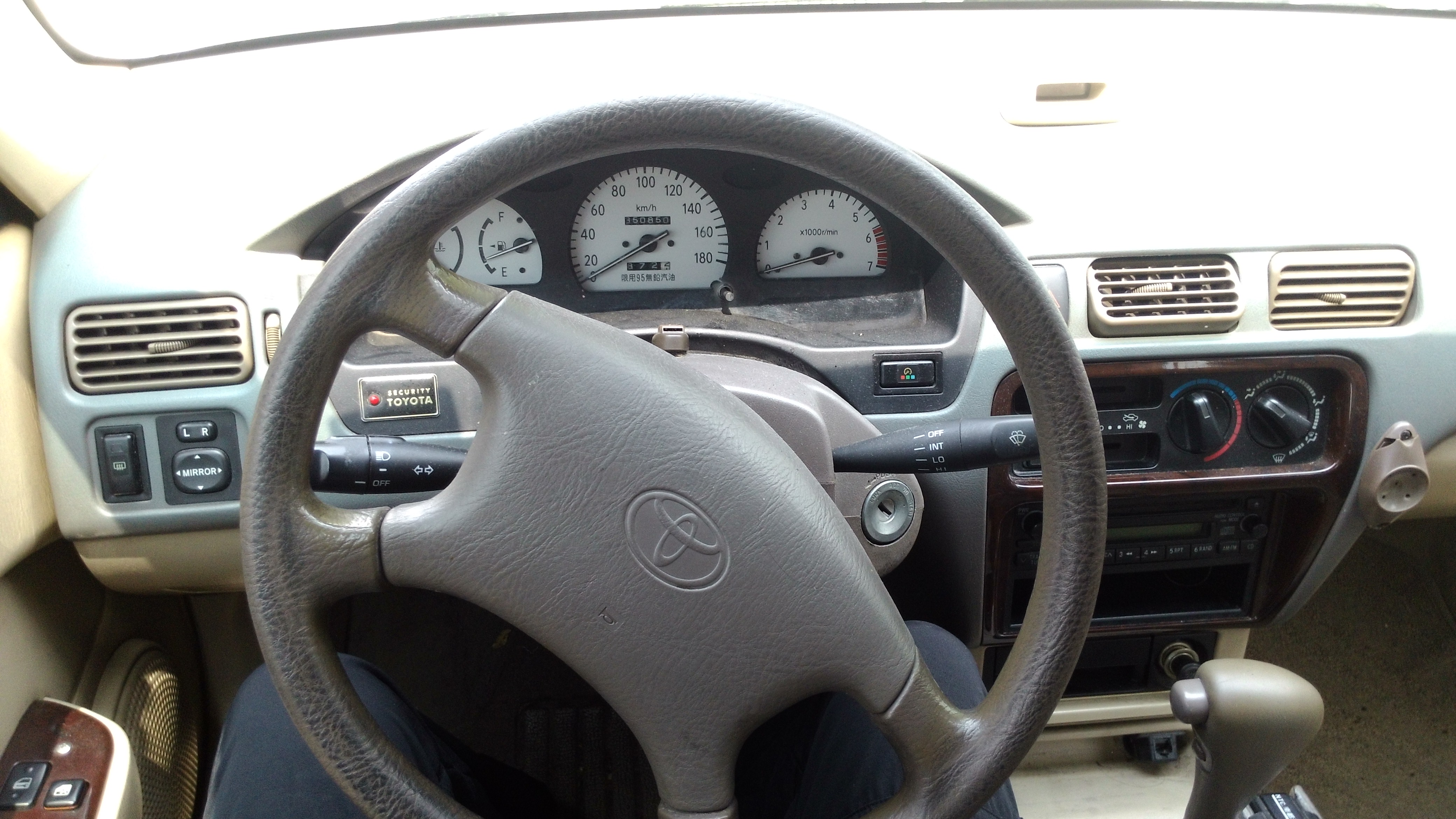
Interior

==== Chile ====
The fifth generation of Tercel was introduced in September 1995, presented in the FISA auto Show of that year as the "all-new Tercel twin cam", available in three different levels: basic XLI, the medium GLI, and the full equipment LEI. All Tercels featured a 5E-FE 1.5 16v twin cam (DOHC) engine, rated at 100 hp (70 kW) at 6,400 rpm and 95 lb⋅ft (129 N⋅m) of torque at 3,200 rpm.

=== Toyota Soluna ===
In Thailand and Indonesia, a version of the Tercel with different front and rear fascias was sold as the Toyota Soluna. The name "Soluna" is taken from Spanish words sol, meaning "sun" and luna, meaning "moon". The Soluna AL50 was powered by the 1.5-litre 5A-FE engine, and campaigned as the "Asian family car". Trim levels are XLi, SLi (Thailand only), and GLi.

Only the SEi (exclusive in Indonesia), XLi and GLi were sold in Thailand (from January 1997) and Indonesia (from 20 April 2000) where the XLi was common for taxis.

A facelifted Soluna appeared in Thailand in late 1999 and arrived in Indonesia in May 2001. Based on the GLi, the Soluna S-Limited with body kits was offered for a short time.

Production was ceased in 2003 with the Vios replacing it as its direct successor.

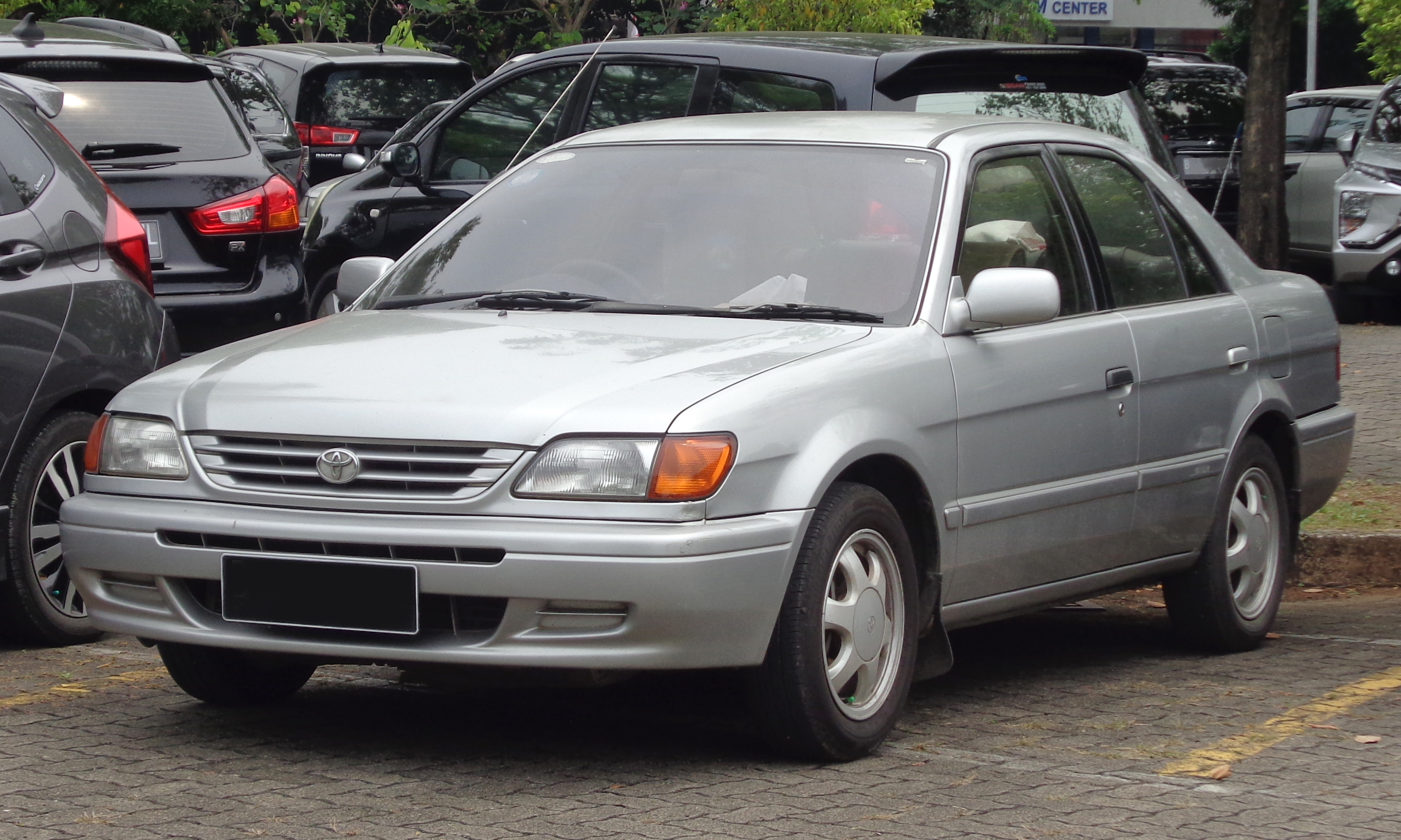
2001 Toyota Soluna 1.5 GLi (AL50; pre-facelift, Indonesia)

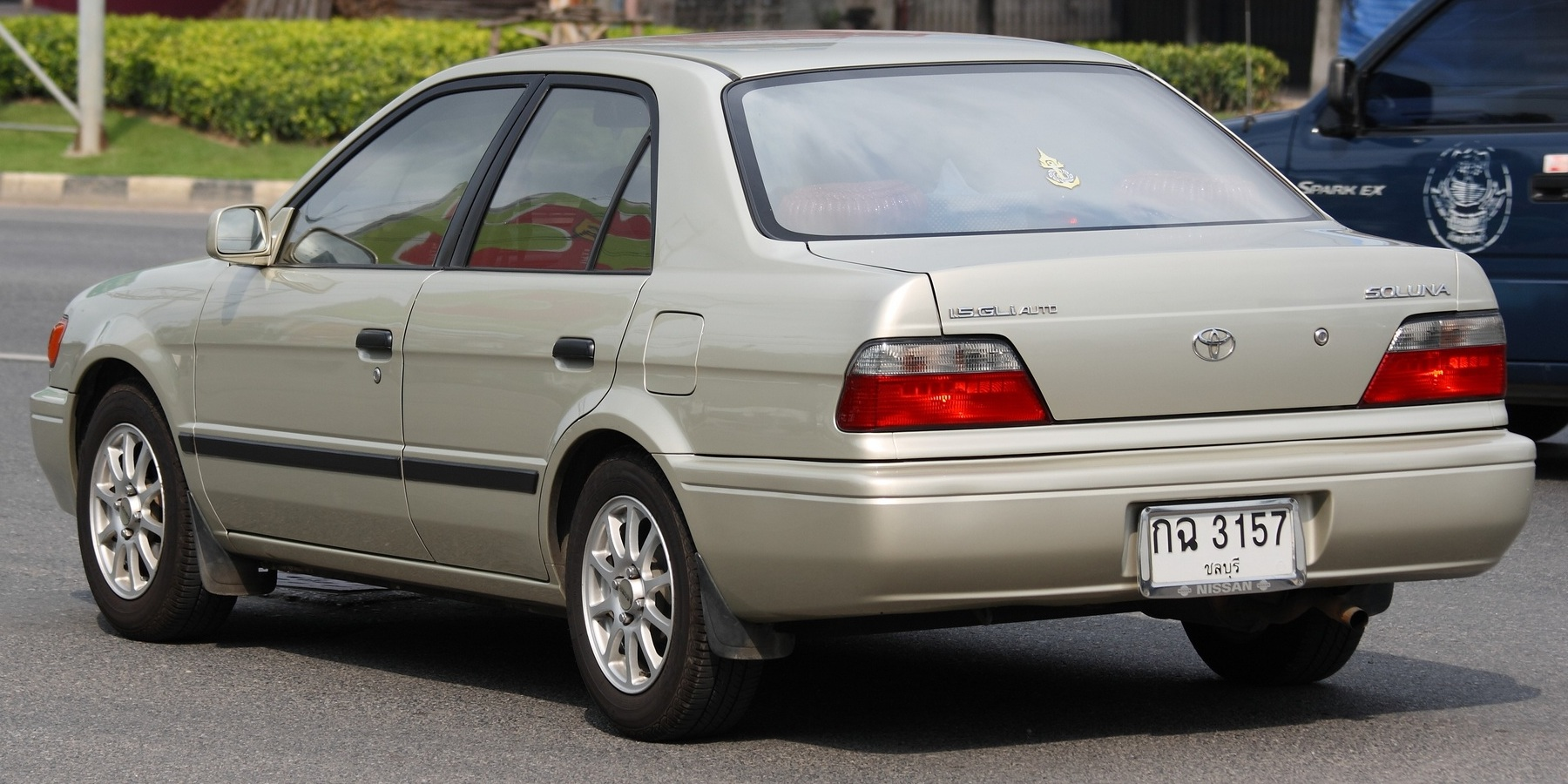
Toyota Soluna 1.5 GLi Auto (AL50; pre-facelift, Thailand)

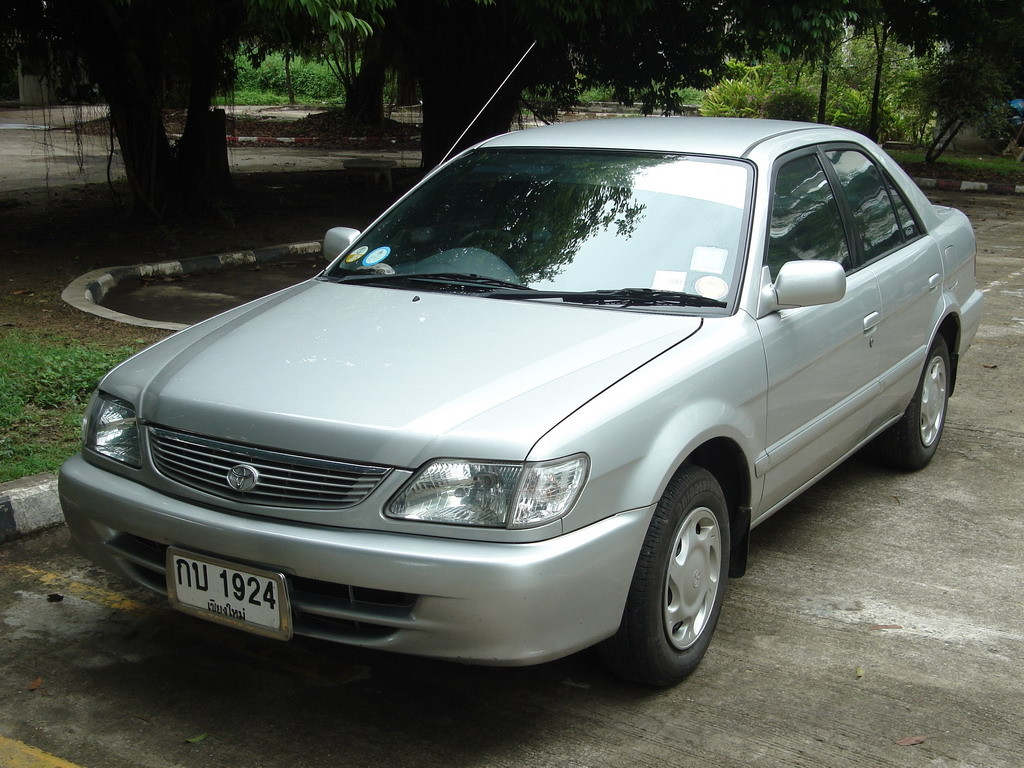
Toyota Soluna 1.5 GLi (AL50; facelift, Thailand)

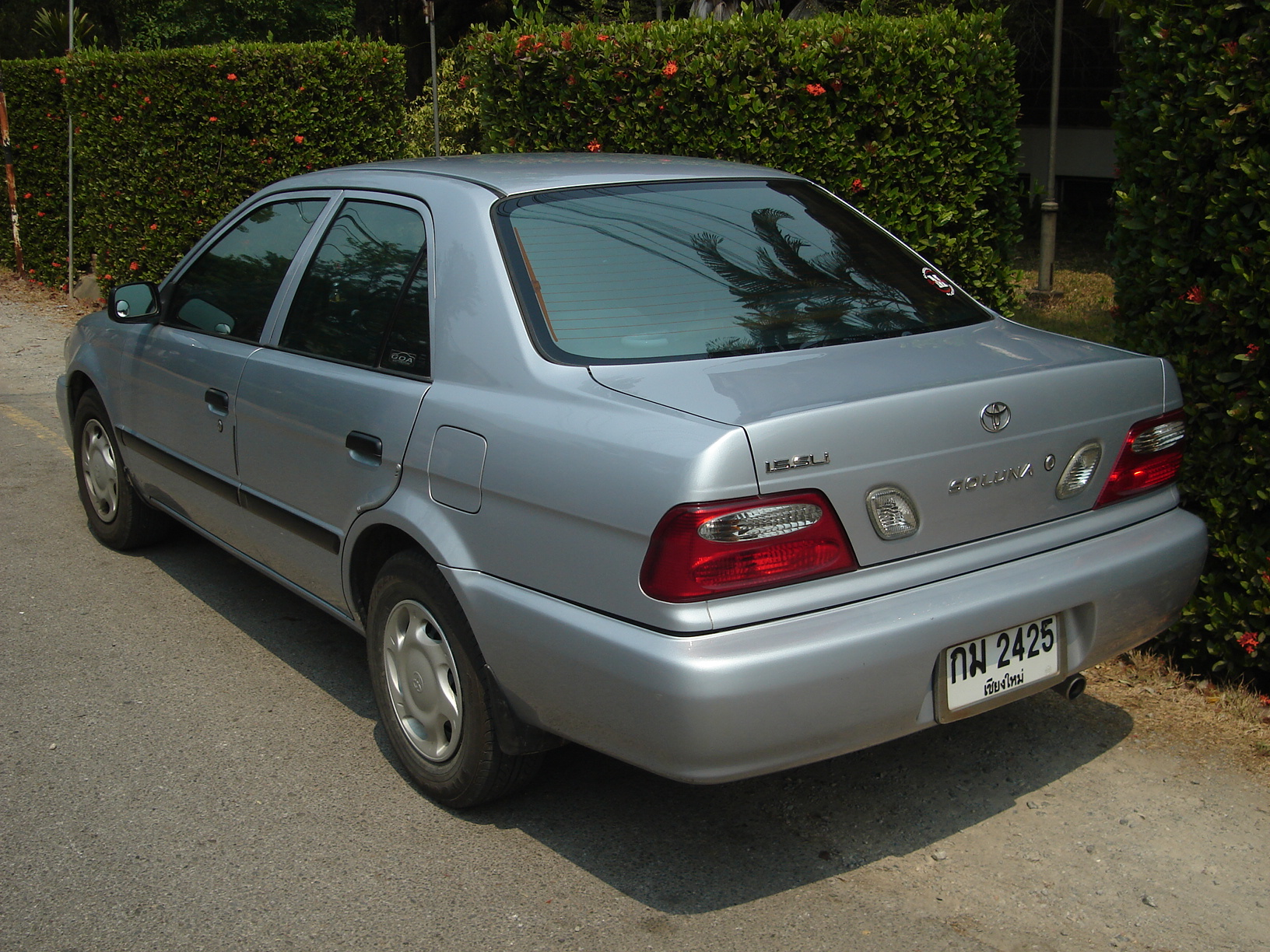
Toyota Soluna 1.5 SLi (AL50; facelift, Thailand)

=== Dimension growth ===
The Tercel remained smaller than the Corolla throughout its production, though by the end of its production the Tercel had become almost the same size as the North American-market 1975–1978 Corollas that were current at the time the first generation Tercel was introduced.

Dimension	1995–1999 Tercel	1975–1978 Corolla
Length	4,120 mm (162.2 in)	4,120 mm (162.2 in)
Width	1,661 mm (65.4 in)	1,585 mm (62.4 in)
Height	1,349 mm (53.1 in)	1,384 mm (54.5 in)
Wheelbase	2,380 mm (93.7 in)	2,370 mm (93.3 in)
Curb weight	909 kg (2,005 lb)	1,002 kg (2,210 lb)
