= Toyota Starlet =

Subcompact car produced by Toyota (1973-1999)

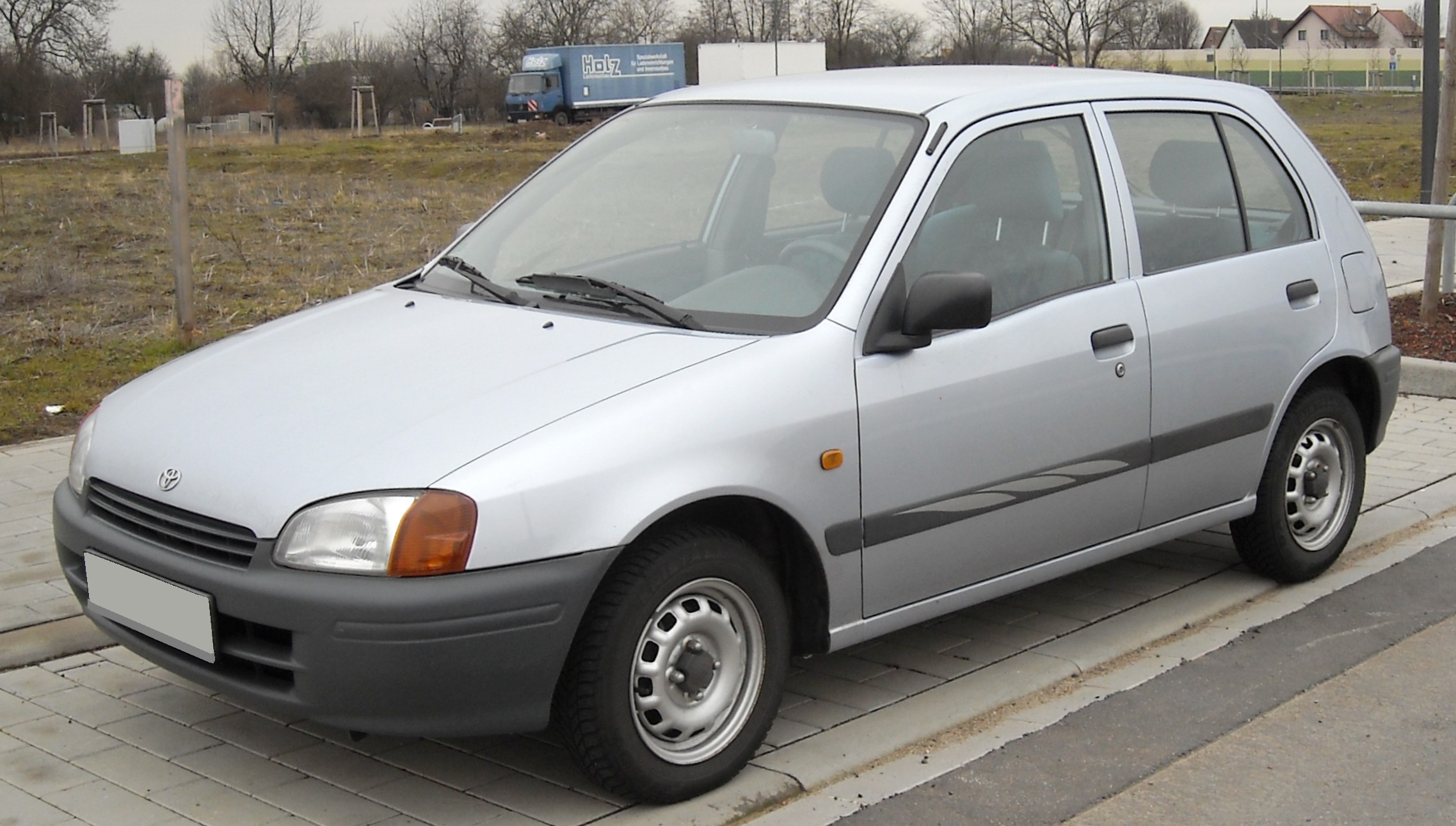
- Toyota Starlet 1.3 XLi 5-door (EP91, Europe)

Overview
- Manufacturer: Toyota
- Production: April 1973 – July 1999

Body and chassis
- Class: Subcompact car
- Layout: Front-engine, rear-wheel-drive (1973–1984); Front-engine, front-wheel-drive (1984–1999)

Chronology
- Predecessor: Toyota Publica
- Successor: Toyota Vitz/Echo/Yaris

The Toyota Starlet (Japanese: トヨタ・スターレット, Hepburn: Toyota Sutāretto) is a subcompact car manufactured by Toyota from 1973 until 1999, replacing the Publica, but retaining the Publica's "P" code and generation numbering. The first generation Starlet was sold as the Publica Starlet in some markets. In Japan, it was exclusive to Toyota Auto Store dealers.

It was the first subcompact car from a Japanese automaker to offer a high-performance variant. These were available in three generations: the 1986–1989 Turbo S (EP71), the 1990–1995 GT Turbo (EP82), and the 1996–1999 Glanza V (EP91). Another variant was the Toyota Sera, a sport compact made in the early 1990s and officially sold only in Japan; the Sera had a unique two-door coupé body and butterfly doors but shared the Starlet's chassis and mechanicals.

The second generation Starlet was briefly exported to North America, from 1981 to 1984.

In 1999, the Starlet was replaced by the Vitz—sold as the Echo or Yaris in international markets—and the bB mini MPV, which was also sold as the Scion xB in Canada and the United States. However, Toyota effectively vacated the European city car market until the Aygo was launched in 2005.

The "Starlet" nameplate was revived in 2020 for a rebadged Suzuki Baleno hatchback, sold exclusively in some African countries (and in India under the "Glanza" name).

== First generation (P40/P50; 1973) ==
First generation
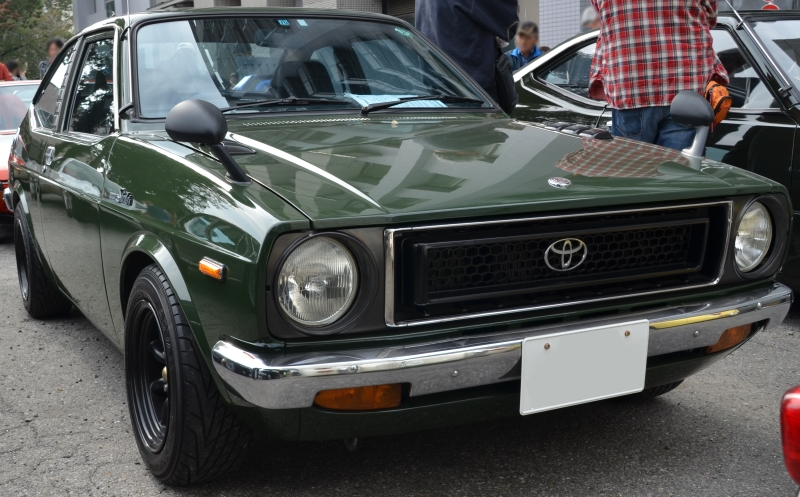
- Toyota Publica Starlet 1200 SR Coupé (KP47, Japan)

Overview
- Model code: P40; P50
- Also called: Daihatsu Consorte
- Production: April 1973–1978
- Assembly: Japan

Body and chassis
- Body style: 2-door coupé; 4-door sedan
- Layout: Front-engine, rear-wheel-drive
- Related: Toyota Publica

Powertrain
- Engine: 993 cc 2K I4; 1,166 cc 3K/3K-B/3K-BR/3K-U I4
- Transmission: 4-speed manual K40; 5-speed manual K50; 2-speed automatic A20 "Toyoglide"

Dimensions
- Wheelbase: 2,265 mm (89.2 in)
- Length: 3,790 mm (149.2 in)
- Width: 1,530 mm (60.2 in)
- Height: 1,310–1,325 mm (51.6–52.2 in)
- Curb weight: 720–785 kg (1,587–1,731 lb)

Chronology
- Predecessor: Toyota Publica (pre-facelift)

Initially launched in April 1973 as the higher-grade and bigger model of the Publica P30, the Starlet was offered with 1,000 and 1,200 cc engines. The coupé's wedgy design was developed from sketches made by Giorgetto Giugiaro. Model codes are KP40/KP45 for the sedan and coupé versions with the 1-litre engine and KP42/KP47 for the larger engined versions. Generally the car looked like a shortened Corolla. The body style was originally available only as a two-door coupé and was often referred to as a "Baby Celica." The four-door sedan arrived in October 1973. Grades offered were Standard, Deluxe, Hi-Deluxe, ST, and SR. The top models were also offered with a five-speed manual transmission. The single-carb 1.0-litre 2K engine develops 58 PS (43 kW) at 6,000 rpm while the 1.2 offers 68 PS (50 kW) at the same engine speed. The twin-carb 3K-BR engine with 9.0:1 compression ratio and 74 PS (54 kW) at 6,600 rpm used regular petrol, while a version with 10.0:1 compression (3K-B) running on premium petrol was offered in a single version of the top SR model. This engine has 77 PS (57 kW) at 6,000 rpm.

The Starlet coupé and four-door were never sold in Europe and were generally not seen in most export markets, Toyota instead choosing to focus on the lower-cost Publica (1000) two-door sedan and station wagon.

In February 1976, the Starlet underwent some changes, mainly to meet Japan's new emissions requirements. The 3K engine was replaced by the cleaner 1.2-litre 3K-U type, while the 1-litre option and the twin-carb 1.2 options were discontinued (in Japan, at least). With the update, the chassis number was changed to KP51 for both body styles. The new engine featured Toyota's TTC-C emissions control system with a catalytic converter and power accordingly dropped to 64 PS (47 kW) at 5,800 rpm. In September of the same year, the two-speed Toyoglide automatic gearbox became an option. The Starlet underwent an additional minor revision in January 1977; the ST version received intermittent wipers at this time. The first generation Starlet was discontinued in January 1978.

The Toyota Starlet coupé was also a fixture in Japan's hotly contested TS/GTS-A (Special Touring) racing class for cars up to 1300 cc. In August 1972, the JAF made a rule change which allowed manuafacturers to change the valvetrain design of an engine, with a minimum annual production of 50 engines. Toyota and Yamaha immediately developed a bored out, 16-valve DOHC version called the 3K-R engine. Thus equipped, the Starlet dominated the class for a period.

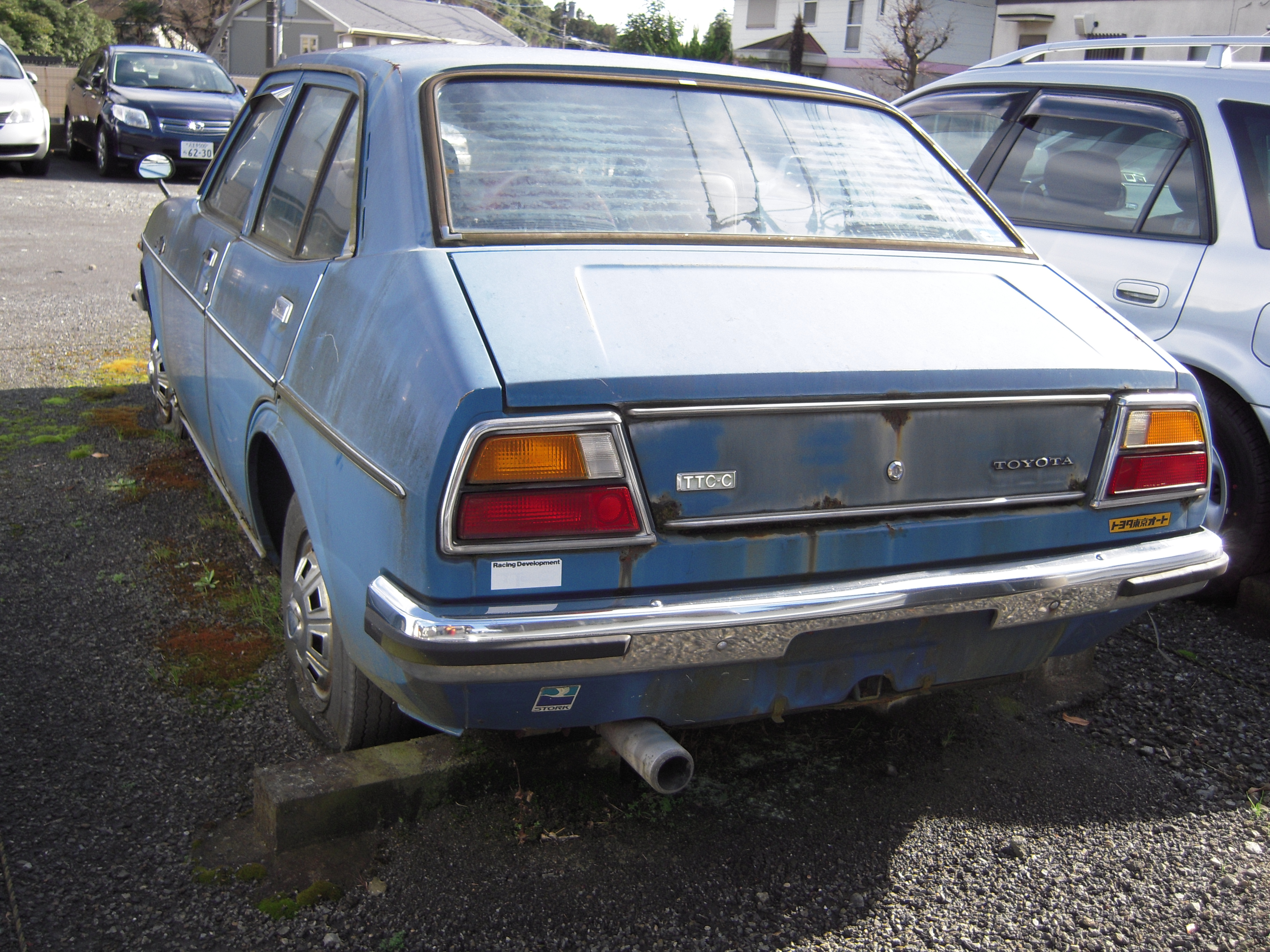
The rear view of a Toyota Publica Starlet Sedan

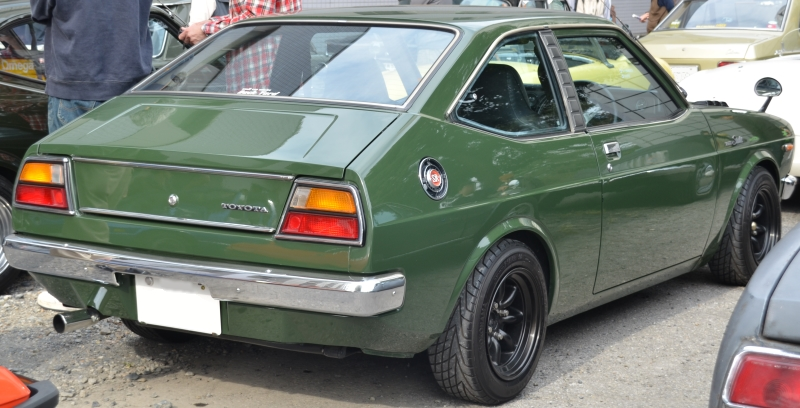
The rear view of a Toyota Publica Starlet 1200 SR Coupé (KP47, Japan)

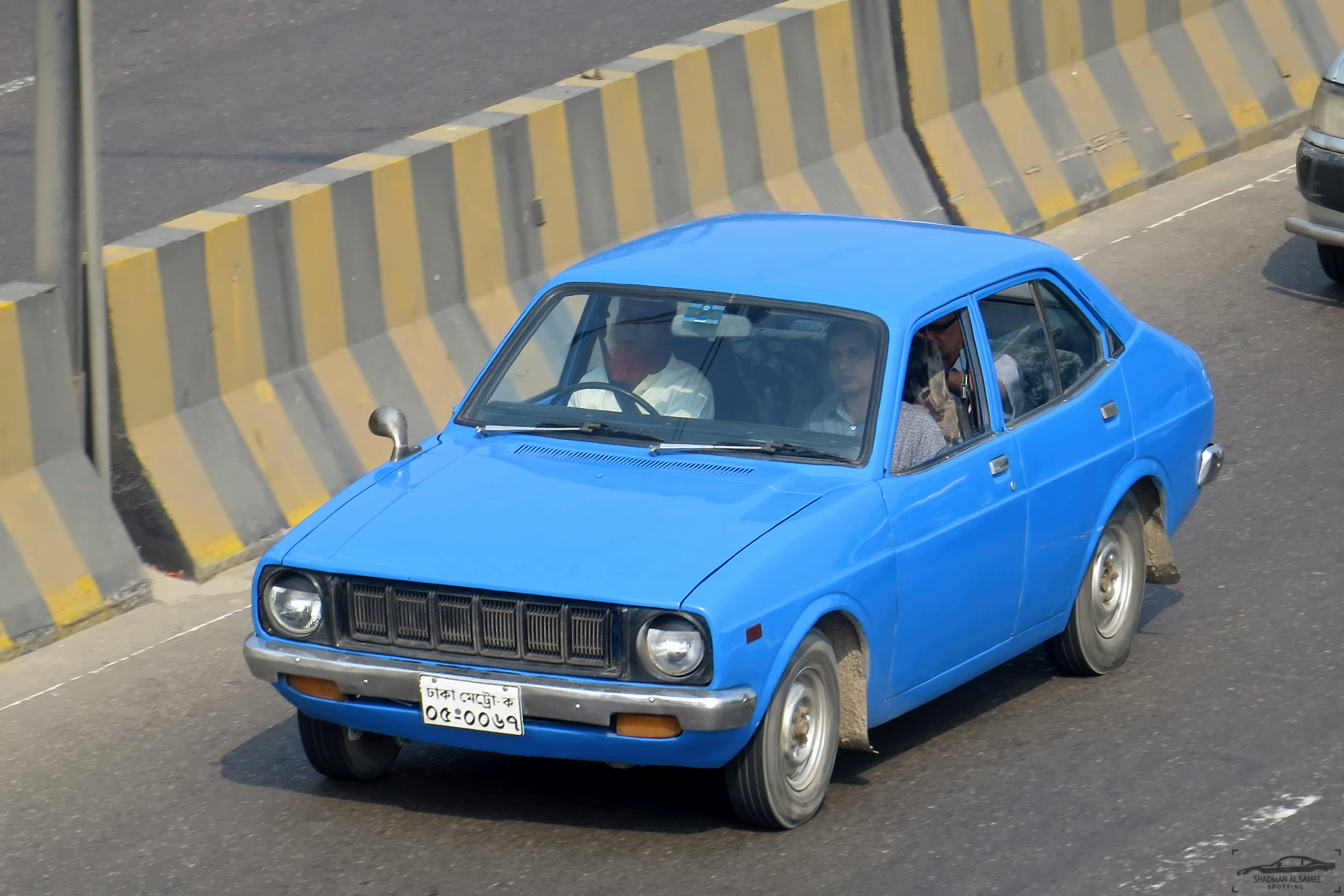
Toyota Publica Starlet Sedan

== Second generation (P60; 1978) ==
Second generation
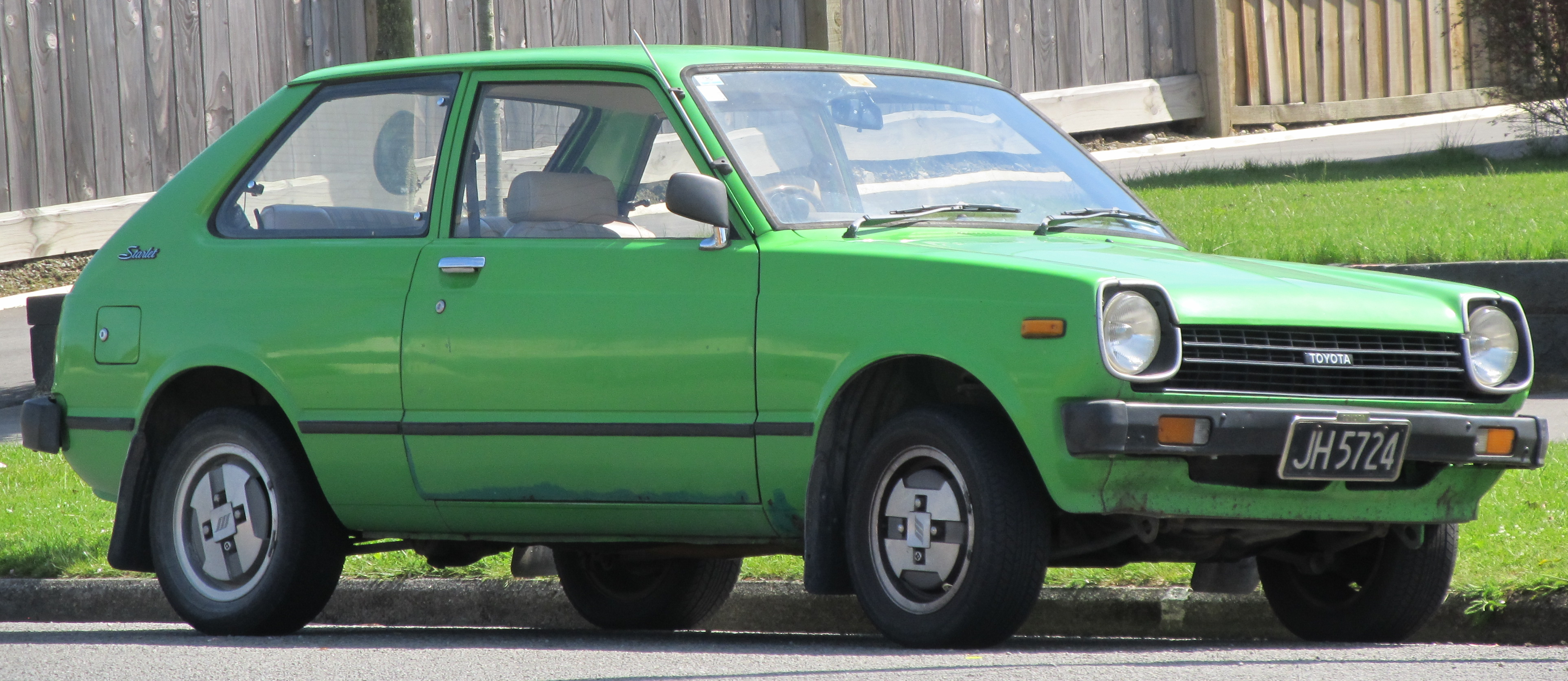
- Pre-facelift Toyota Starlet 3-door hatchback (KP60, New Zealand)

Overview
- Model code: P60
- Production: February 1978–October 1984
- Assembly: Japan

Body and chassis
- Body style: 3/5-door hatchback; 3/5-door station wagon/van
- Layout: Front-engine, rear-wheel-drive
- Related: Toyota Tercel

Powertrain
- Engine: 993 cc 2K I4 (KP60); 1166 cc 3K I4 (KP62); 1290 cc 4K/4K-E I4 (KP61)
- Transmission: K40 (4-speed manual); K50/K51 (5-speed manual); A40 3-speed automatic (second facelift)

Dimensions
- Wheelbase: 2,300 mm (90.6 in) (hatchback); 2,325 mm (91.5 in) (wagon)
- Length: 3,680–3,745 mm (144.9–147.4 in); 3,850 mm (151.6 in) (Van)
- Width: 1,525–1,535 mm (60.0–60.4 in)
- Height: 1,370–1,395 mm (53.9–54.9 in)
- Curb weight: 695–750 kg (1,532–1,653 lb)

The 60 series, introduced in February 1978, was better known than its predecessor due to being the first Starlet extensively sold outside Japan. It was particularly well received in Europe, including the United Kingdom, at which time superminis were soaring in popularity. It was offered with a 993 (KP60 2K), 1,166 (KP62, 3K) or 1,290 cc (KP61, 4K) engine. Three- and five-door hatchbacks were offered in export markets, although a longer five-door wagon variant (also known as the "Van" in the Japanese market) was sold in Japan and certain Asian and European markets. The Van arrived in October 1978, at the same time that the 1.2-litre KP62 became available in most export markets. The KP62 was first seen in Sweden in July 1978, where it was equipped with the de-smogged 3K-C engine to meet that country's particular emissions requirements. In Japan, all Starlets except the Van were only available with the larger 1.3-litre engine; the Van model retained the smaller, 1.2-litre, 3K-HJ type.

The 60 series Starlet was the first Toyota passenger car to utilize rack-and-pinion steering. Suspension on 60 series Starlets is in the form of MacPherson front struts accompanied by four link rear suspension with coil springs for hatchback models and leaf spring suspension on van models.

Trim levels were Standard, De Luxe (also known as DX in some markets), GL, XL, S, Si, Sprint, SE and Lisse. Si models have a fuel injected 4K-E engine. Sprint models included the upgraded Toyota Sports Handling Suspension, a tachometer, five-speed (K50) transmission, 1,290cc (4K) engine and a sportier interior compared to other models. The external trimming on Sprint models is also clipped into place, as opposed to being glued on as in other models. Sprint models include the same alloy wheels as featured on early AE86 Corollas as well. Japanese market models did not generally have self-retracting rear seatbelts. Japanese and New Zealand market models have 203 mm front brake rotors, as opposed to many other markets receiving Starlets with 228 mm front brake rotors.

Vehicles fitted with a 2K engine received a smaller differential (X code, 5.6 in, 142 mm) than vehicles fitted with a 4K engine (U code, 6 in, 152 mm). Differential ratios depend on the trim model and market for each car, with 3.909:1 being common for vehicles with a 2K engine, 4.3:1 for European van models, 3.727:1 for Japanese van models, 3.417:1 for vehicles fitted with an automatic transmission, and 3.583:1 for general applications with a 4K engine. Other ratios also existed for various Japanese market models.

In 1980, the Starlet was facelifted to include square headlights. A second facelift followed in 1983 to incorporate a slant nose front end and a new lower hatch opening.

The 3-door KP61 was the only Starlet ever sold in the US, where it was available from the 1981 through the 1984 model years. The 1981–1982 models came with standard five-speed manual transmissions and tachometers. It is an equivalent to other markets' S model. The 1983–1984 models featured electronic fuel injection (EFI) with the 4K engine, but with a four-speed manual transmission and equipment similar to other markets' XLi model.

Common rust locations on a 60 series Starlet are under the rear hatch seal, around the front window wiper mount, behind the front wings, and the bottom of the doors.

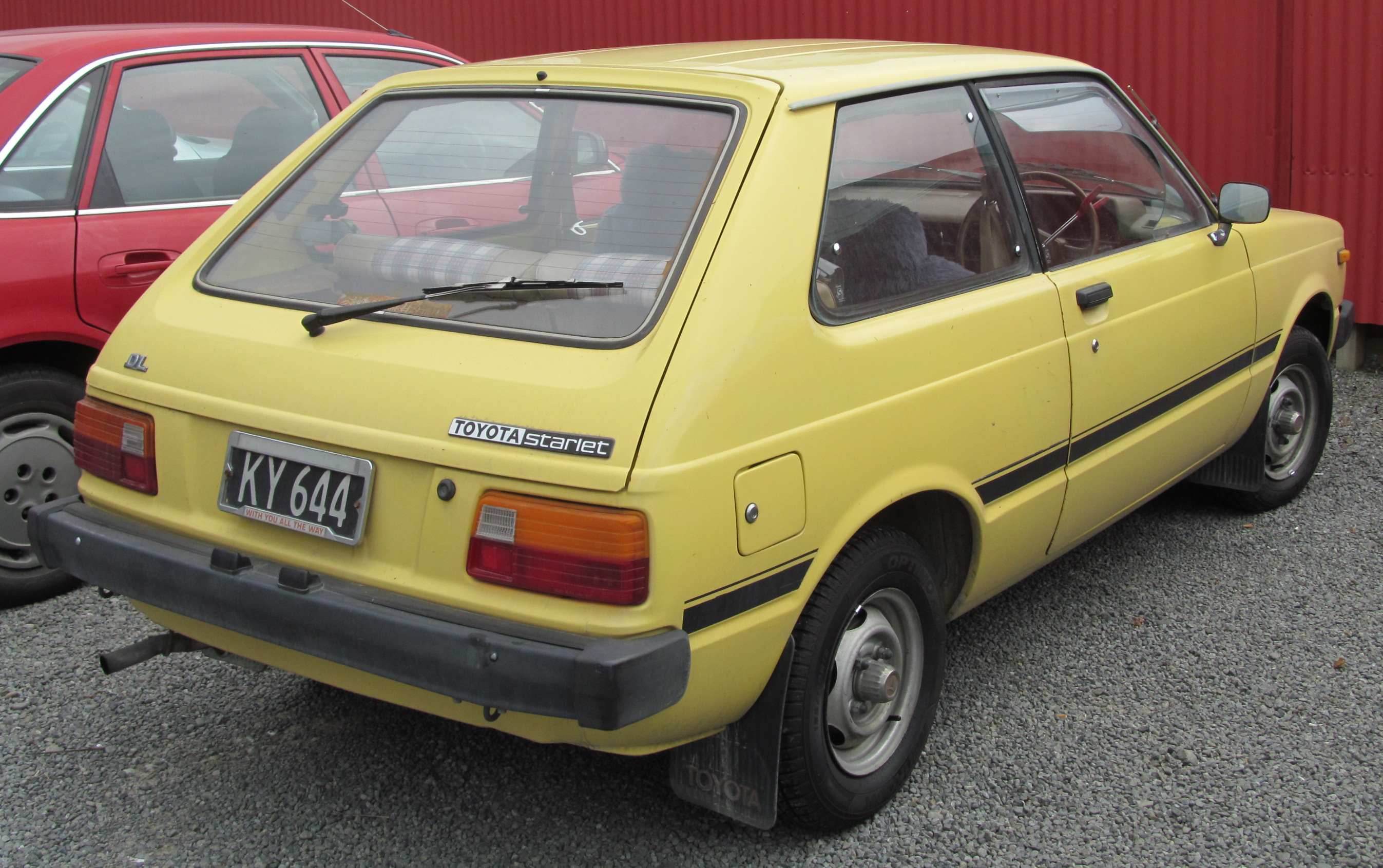
Pre-facelift Toyota Starlet DL 3-door hatchback (New Zealand)

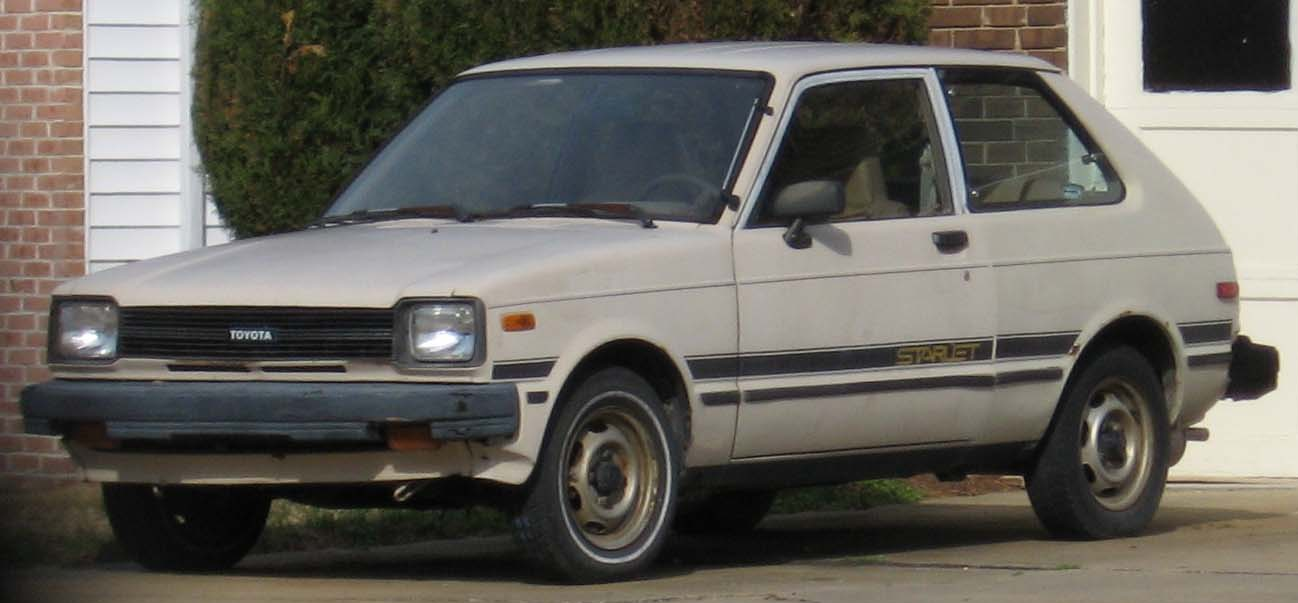
1980–1982 USDM Toyota Starlet 3-door hatchback (KP61, US)

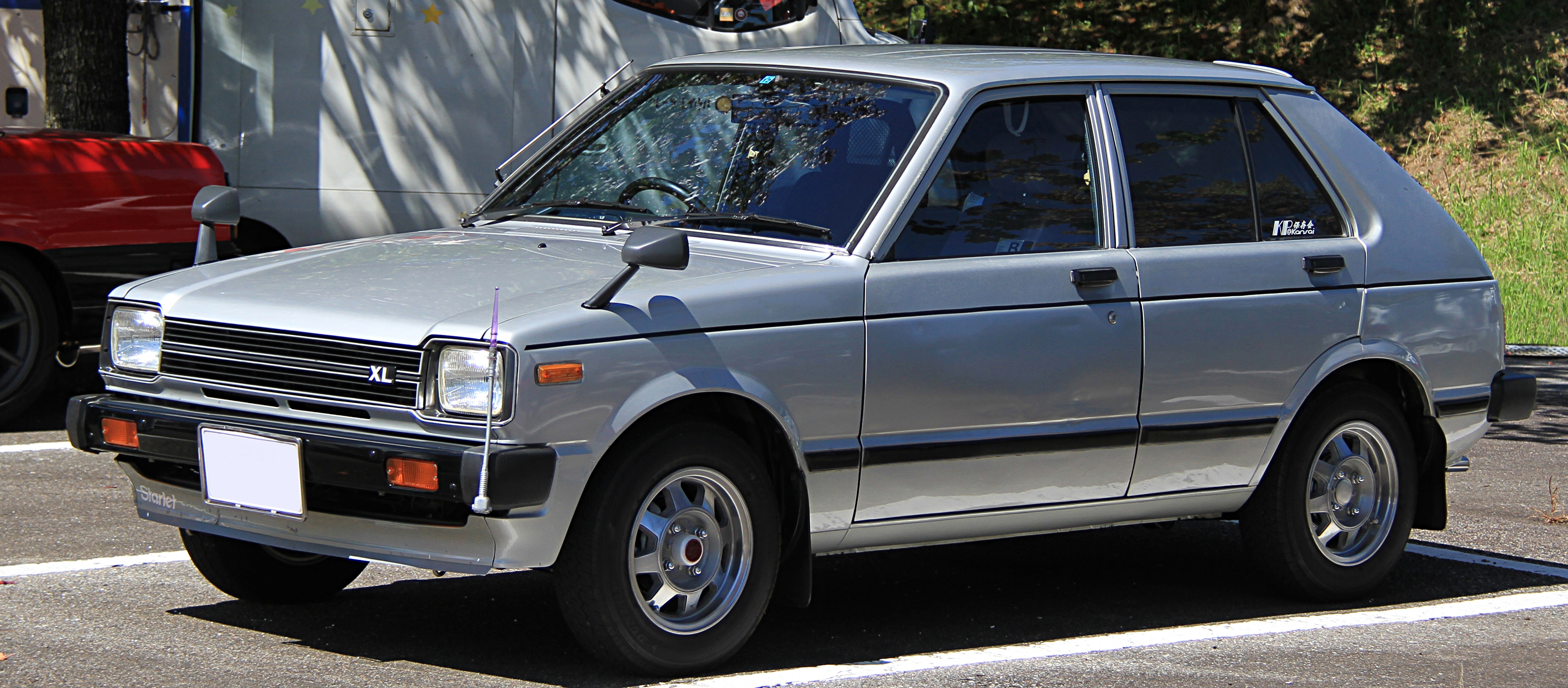
1980–1982 JDM Toyota Starlet XL 5-door hatchback (KP61, Japan)

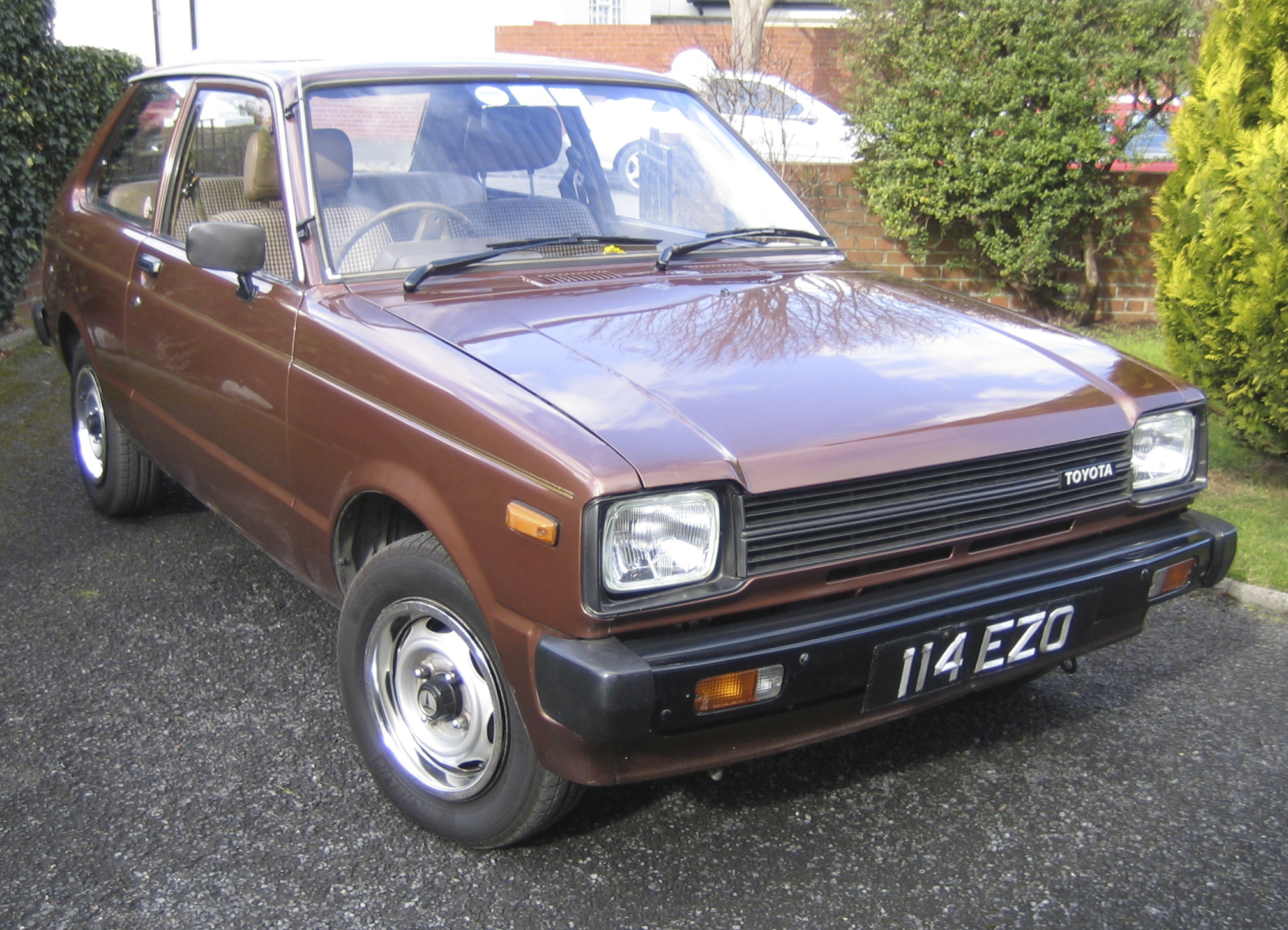
1980–1982 Toyota Starlet 3-door hatchback (KP60, Ireland)

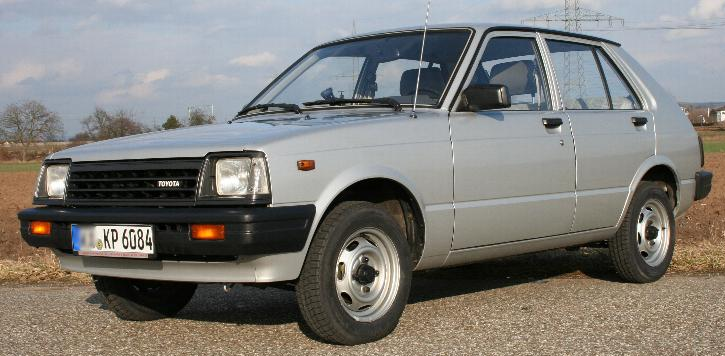
1983–1984 Toyota Starlet 5-door hatchback (KP60, Germany)

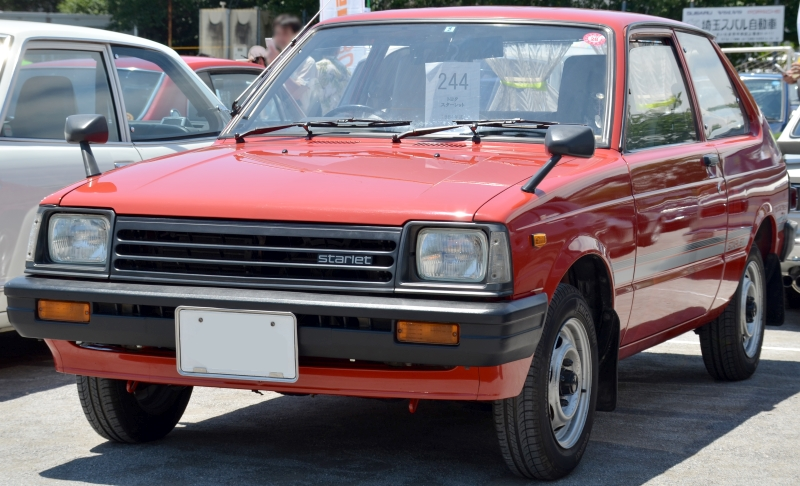
1983–1984 JDM Toyota Starlet 3-door hatchback (KP61, Japan)

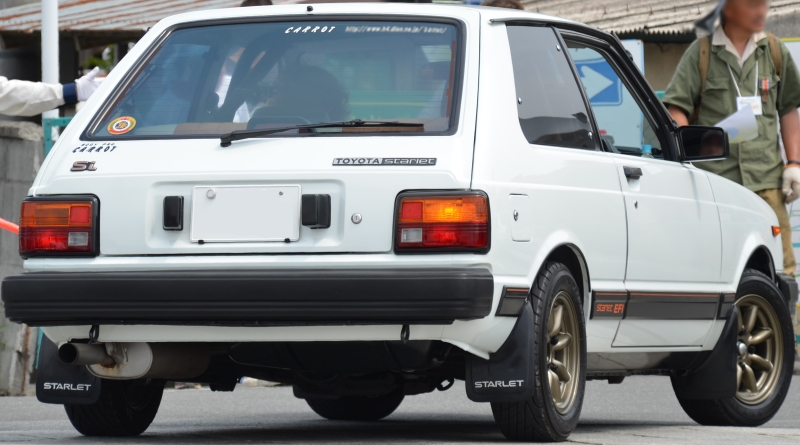
1983–1984 Toyota Starlet Si 3-door hatchback (KP61, Japan)

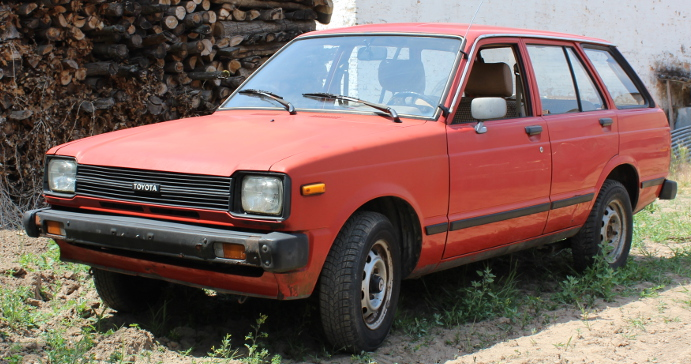
Starlet Kombi / station wagon (Germany)

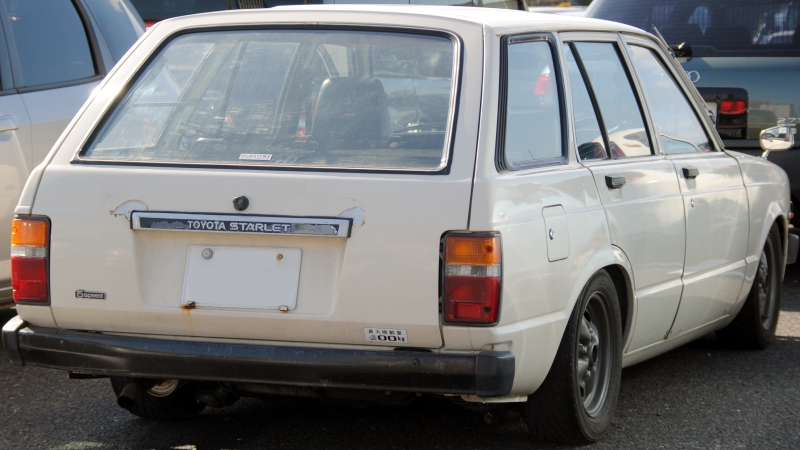
Starlet Van (Japan)

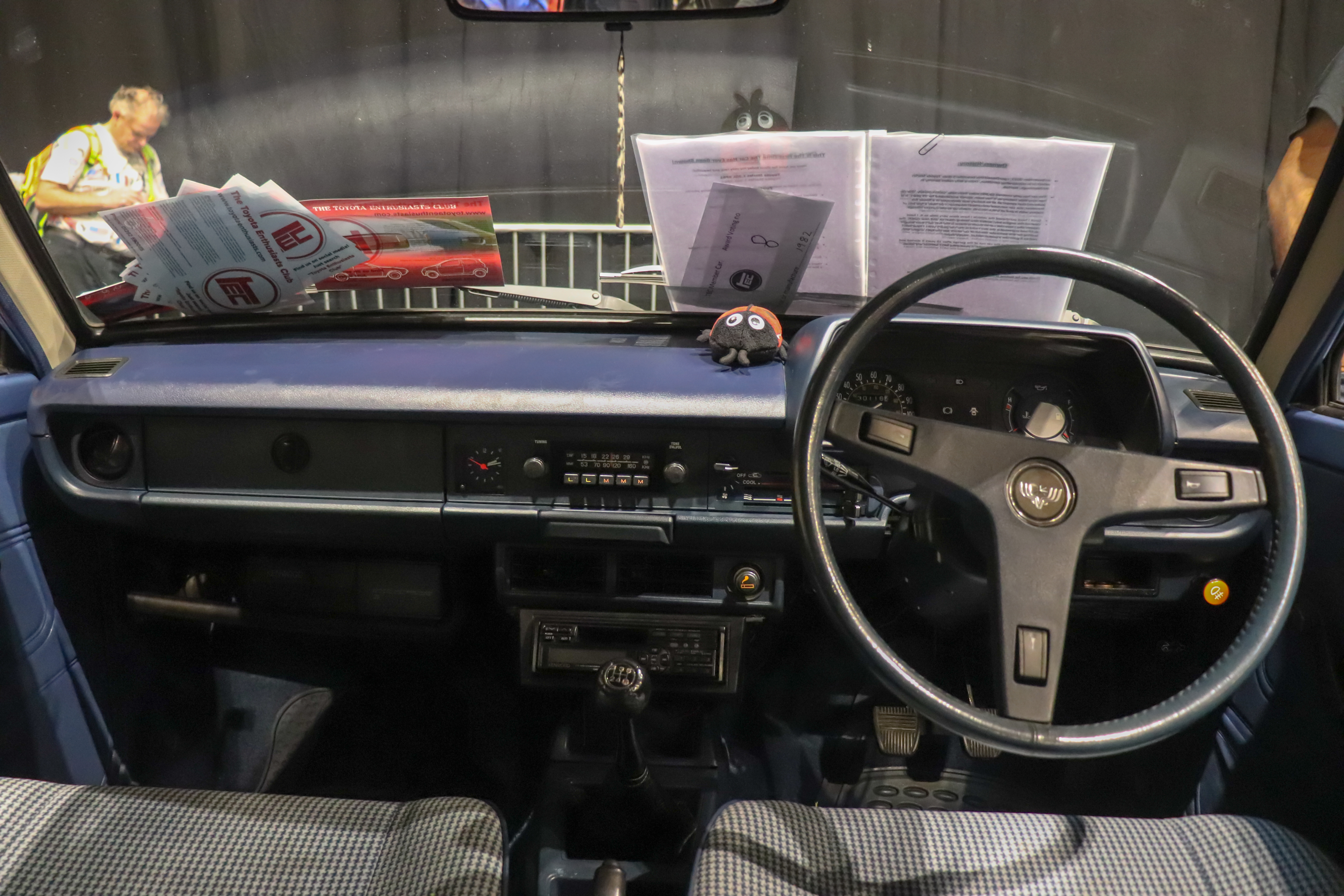
Interior (UK)

== Third generation (P70; 1984) ==
Third generation
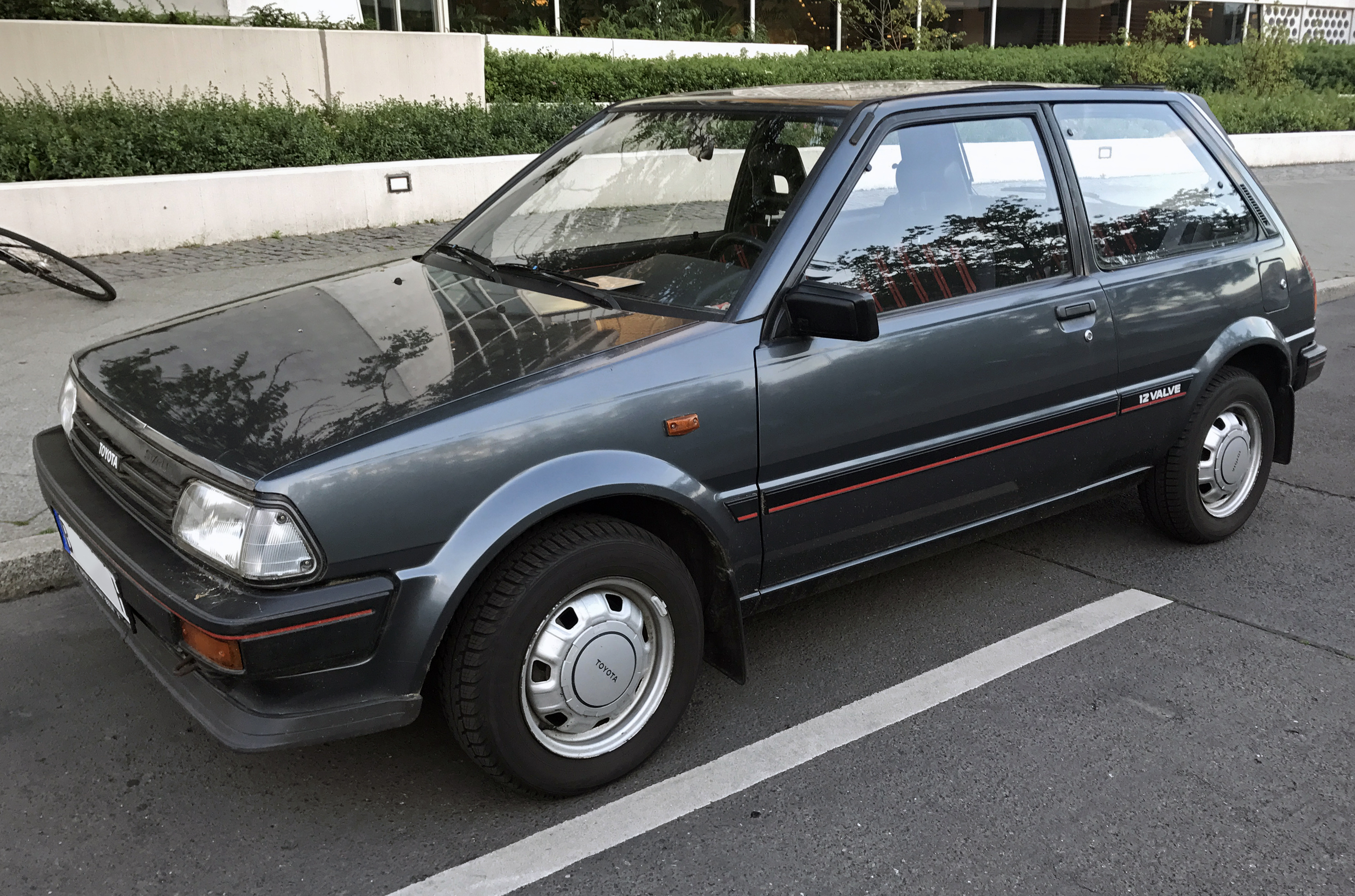
- Pre-facelift Toyota Starlet 1.3 S 3-door (EP71, Germany)

Overview
- Model code: P70
- Production: October 1984 – December 1989
- Assembly: Japan: Aichi (Toyota Industries); Indonesia: Jakarta (Multi Astra)

Body and chassis
- Body style: 3/5-door hatchback; 3-door van
- Layout: Front-engine, front-wheel-drive
- Related: Toyota Tercel/Corsa/Corolla II (EL30)

Powertrain
- Engine: Petrol: 999 cc 1E-L I4 (EP70); 1295 cc 2E-ELU/L/LC/LJ/LU I4 (EP71/76V); 1295 cc 2E-TELU turbo I4 (EP71); Diesel: 1453 cc 1N I4 (NP70/76V)
- Transmission: 4-speed C140 manual; 5-speed C150 manual; 3-speed A131L automatic; 4-speed A140L automatic

Dimensions
- Wheelbase: 2,300 mm (90.6 in)
- Length: 3,700 mm (145.7 in)
- Width: 1,590 mm (62.6 in)
- Height: 1,380 mm (54.3 in)
- Curb weight: 700–750 kg (1,543–1,653 lb)

Chronology
- Successor: Toyota Sprinter (E90) (Van)

The P70 series of October 1984 saw the Starlet switch to front-wheel drive, which was now the normal format for cars of this size. Three-door and five-door hatchbacks were offered, and a three-door van for commercial use was also available in many markets. The 12 valve 1E and 2E engines replaced the old K-series engines. The smaller displacement motor was available for export only. The extensive Japanese line up consisted of Standard, CD-L, DX, DX-A, Soleil, Soleil-L, XL, XL-Lissé, SE, Si, Si Limited, Ri, Turbo R, and Turbo S. The cheaper models were powered by the carburetted 2E-LU engine. Power for the Si, Si Limited came from the fuel-injected 2E-ELU engine.

The sporting turbocharged models were introduced in January 1986. The engine fitted to this model was the 2E-TELU; these models were also fitted with Toyota's active suspension technology called TEMS. The Ri and Turbo R were the light-weight models designed for motorsports.

For the export markets the Starlet 70 series were offered as 1.0 Standard, 1.0 DX, 1.0 XL, 1.0 XL Lisse, 1.3 DX, 1.3 XL, 1.3 S, and 1.3 SE. The export version Si Limited was basically an XL or 1.3 S with front and rear spoilers, sporty red and black interior, multi-point fuel injection and special exterior colours: two-tone black/silver, or white.

The first Starlet assembled outside Japan was the 1985 1.0 XL built in Indonesia. A year later, the 1.3-litre model joined the production line there. The Indonesian-built Starlets were only available as 5-door with carburetor, 4-speed manual transmission for the 1.0-litre, or 5-speed manual gearbox for the 1.3-litre. The smaller engine cars were offered as XL, Lissé and Si Limited, while trim levels for the bigger engine models were SE and Si Limited.

Facelift for the Japanese models was given in 1987 with new nose, tail lights, bigger bumpers, and revised interior. Indonesian-built Starlet received these minor changes in 1988, while the European and general market models retained the older appearance.

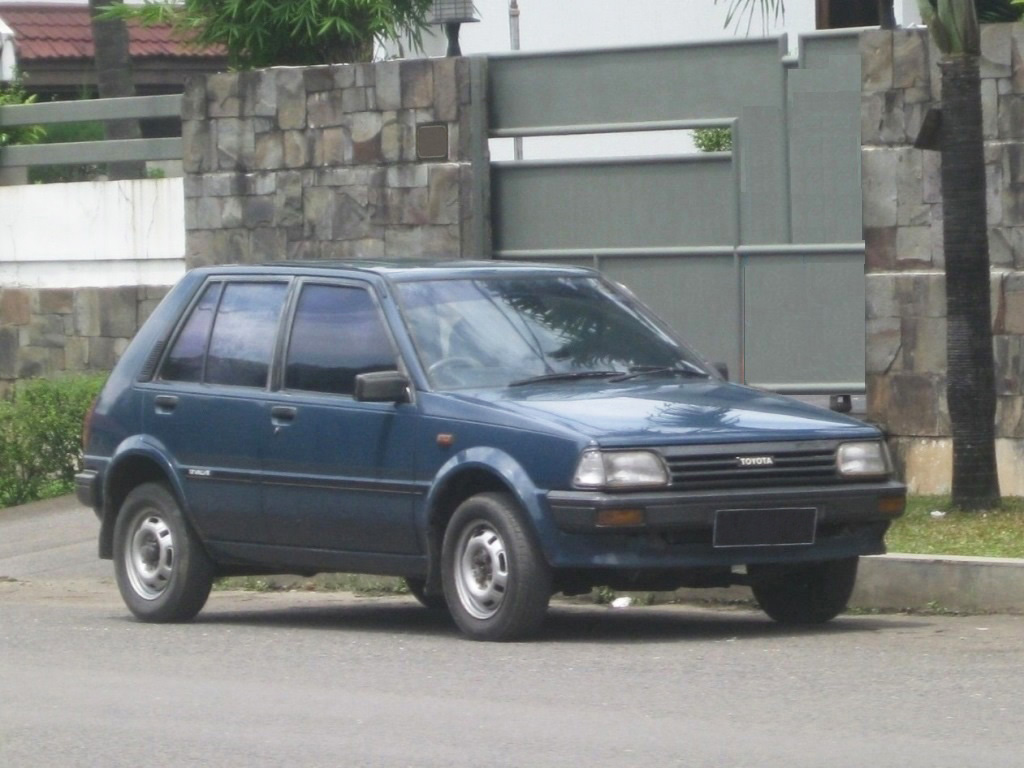
Pre-facelift Toyota Starlet 1.0 XL 5-door (EP70, Indonesia)

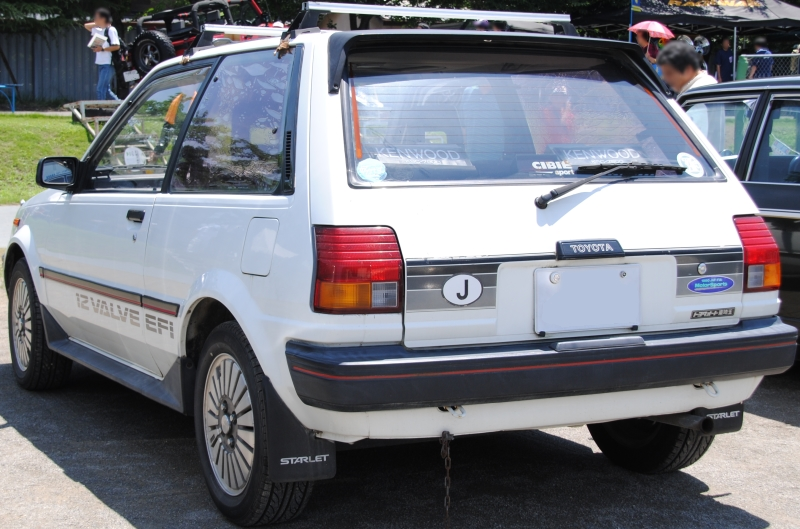
Pre-facelift Toyota Starlet 1.3 Si 3-door (EP71, Japan)

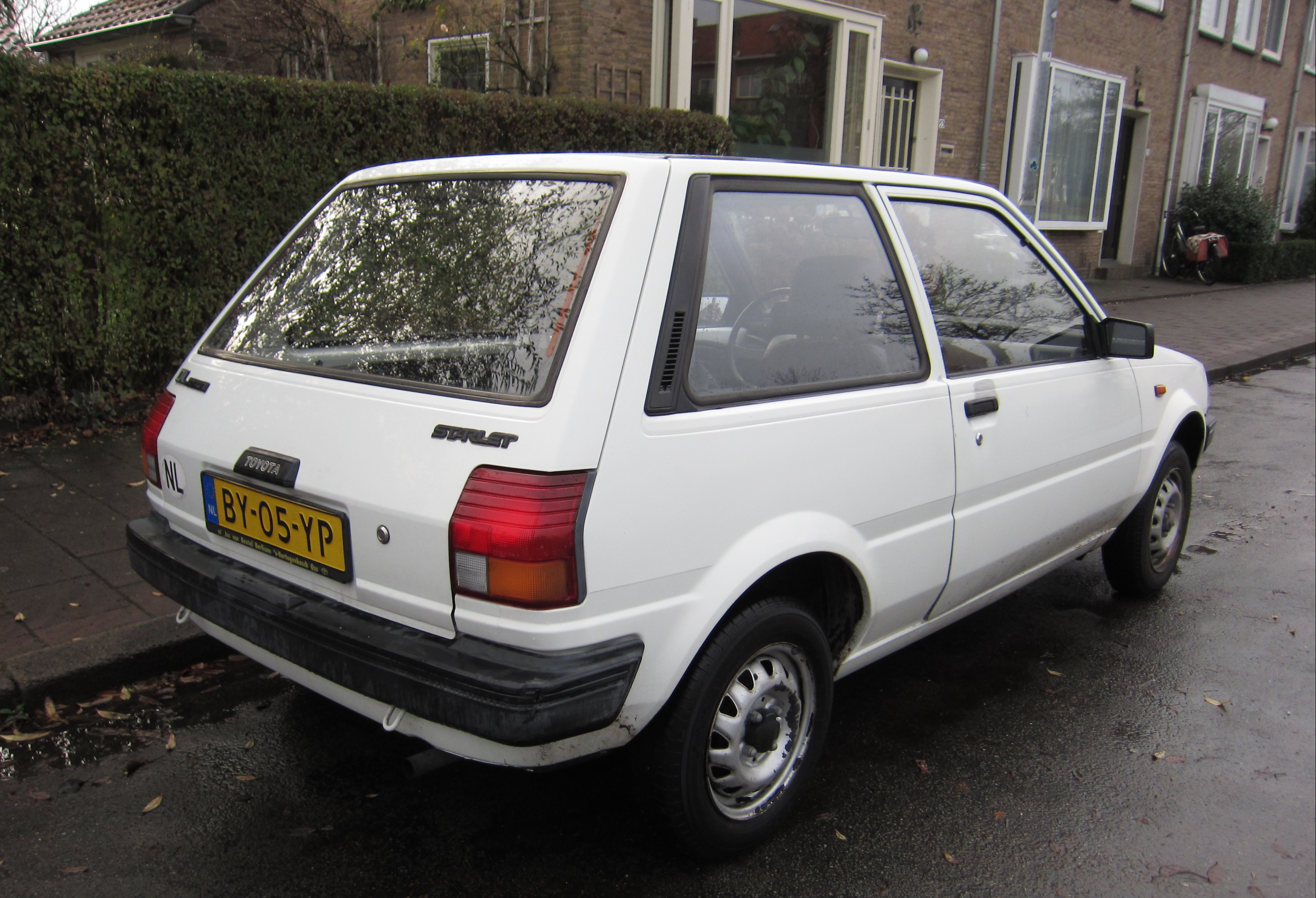
1987 Toyota Starlet 1.0 DL Van (EP70, The Netherlands)

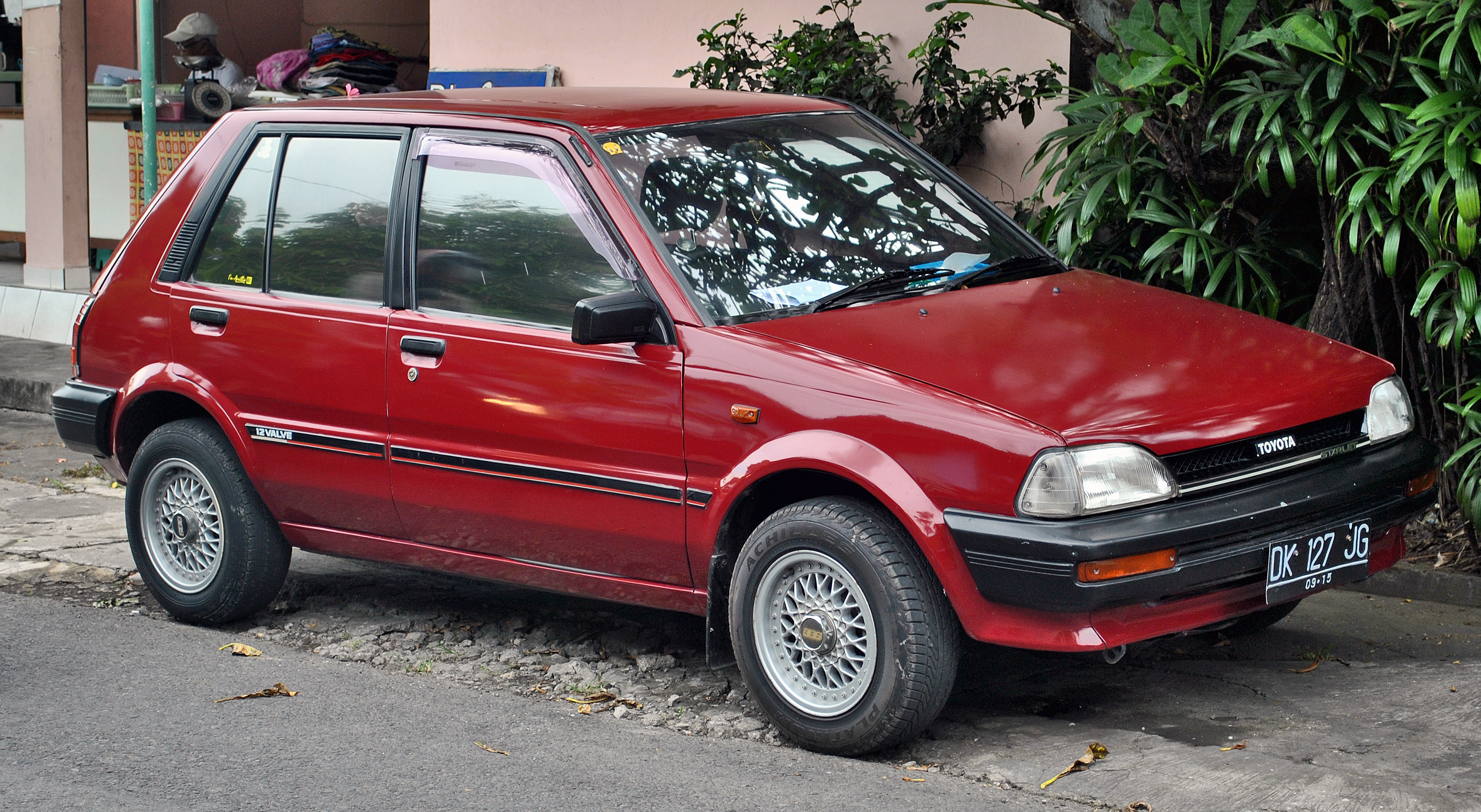
Facelift Toyota Starlet 1.3 SE 5-door (EP71, Indonesia)

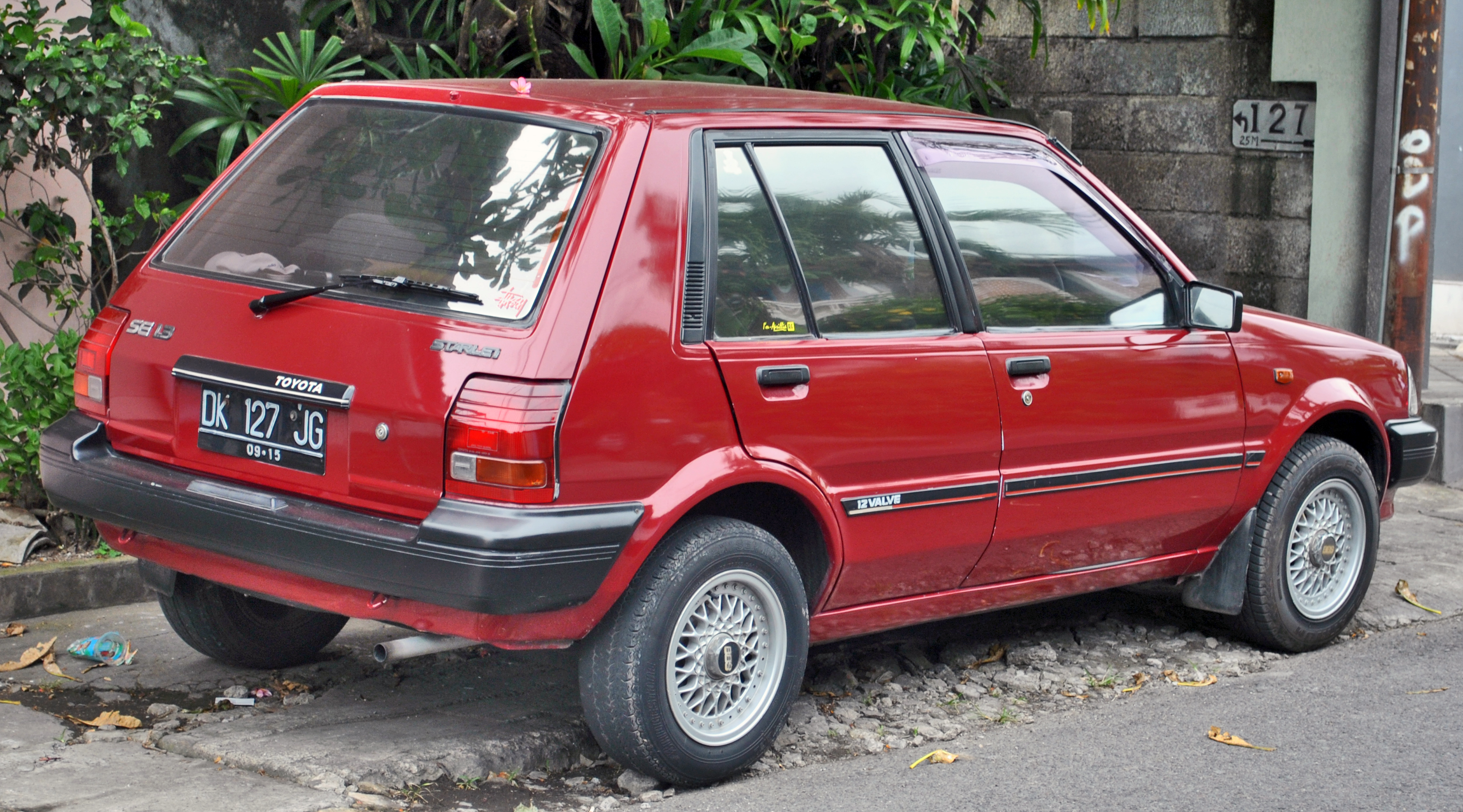
Facelift Toyota Starlet 1.3 SE 5-door (EP71, Indonesia)

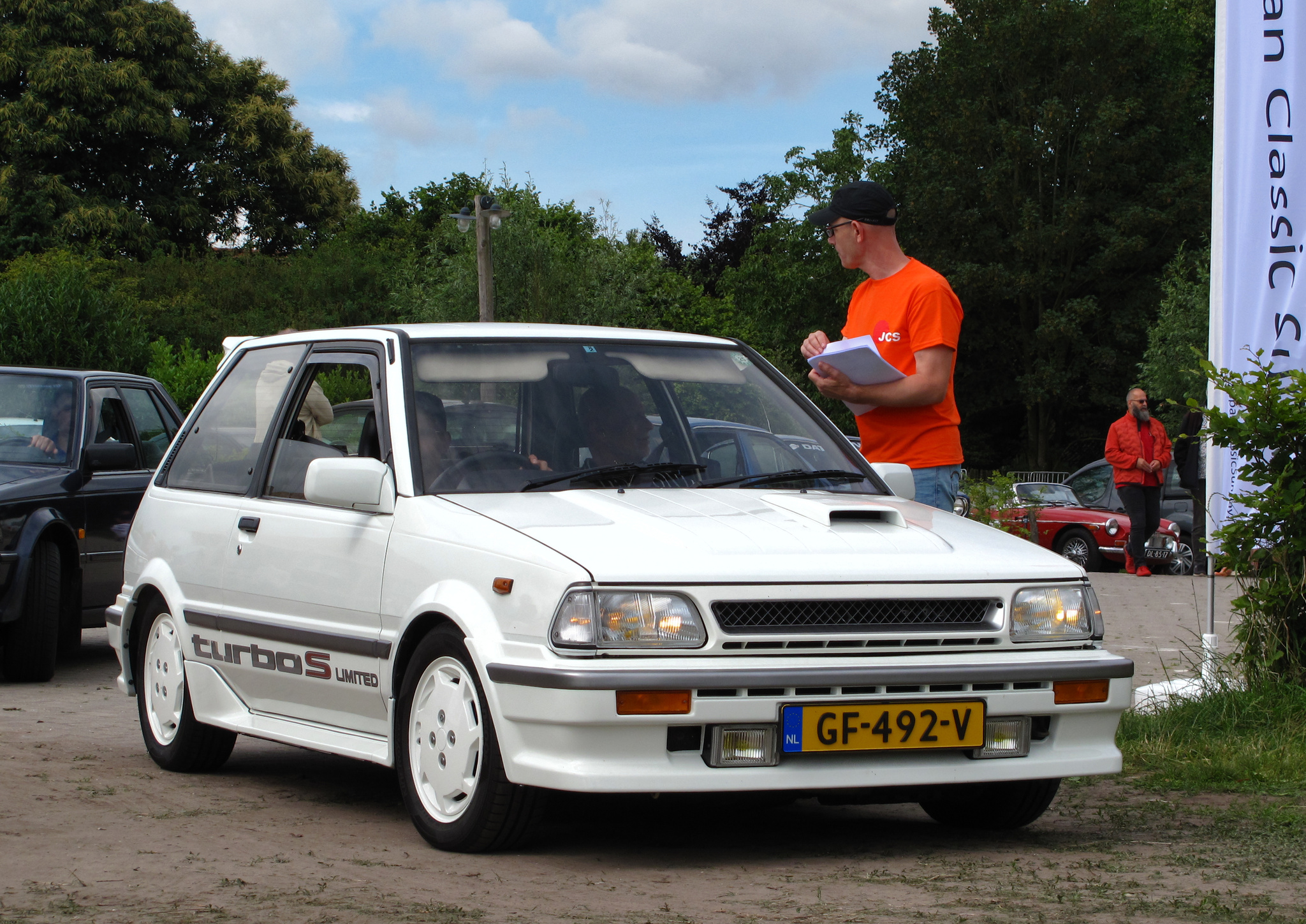
Pre-facelift Toyota Starlet 1.3 Turbo S Limited 3-door (EP71, Japanese market imported to Netherlands)

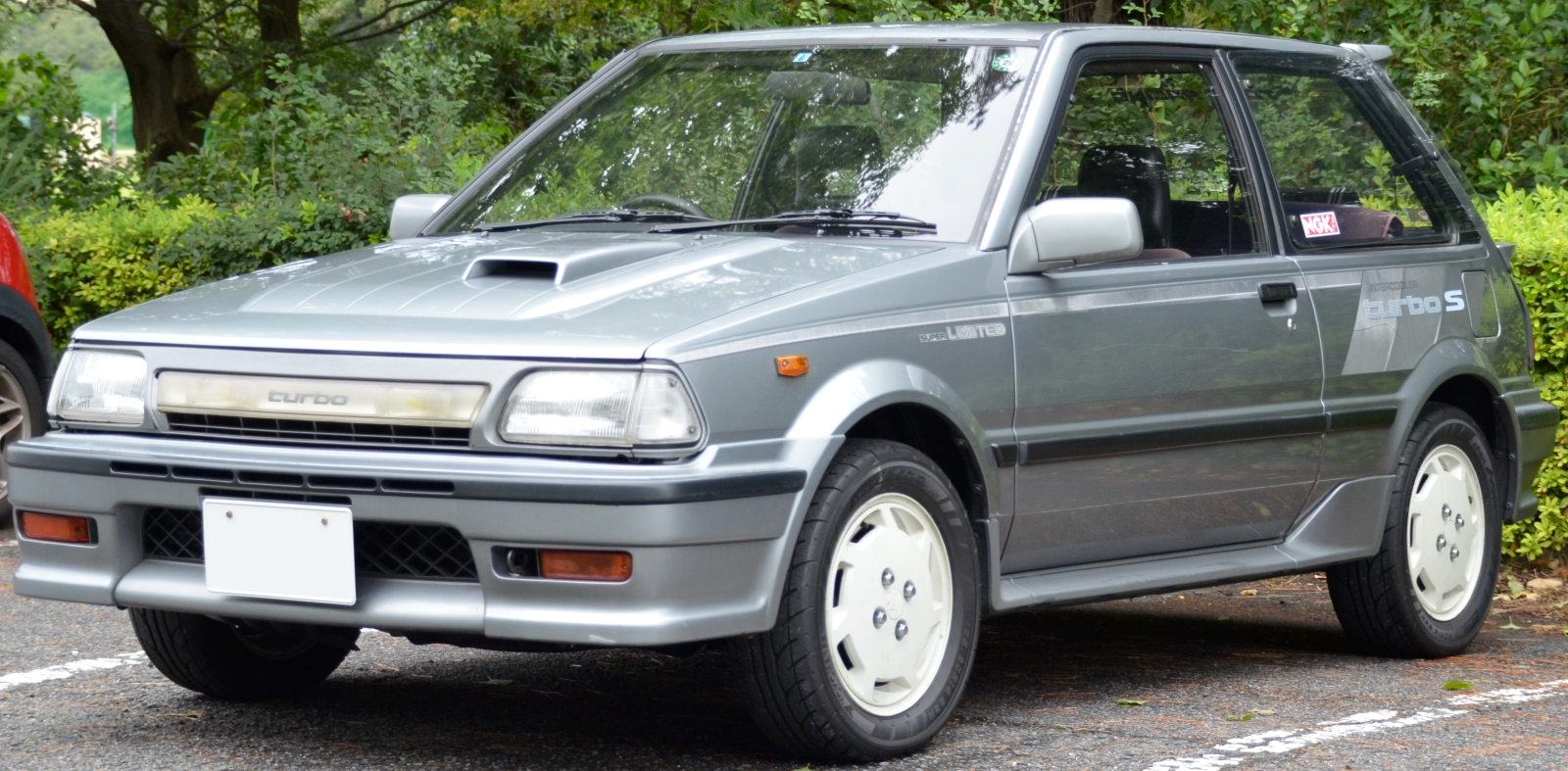
Facelift Toyota Starlet 1.3 Turbo S Limited 3-door (EP71, Japan)

== Fourth generation (P80; 1989) ==
Fourth generation
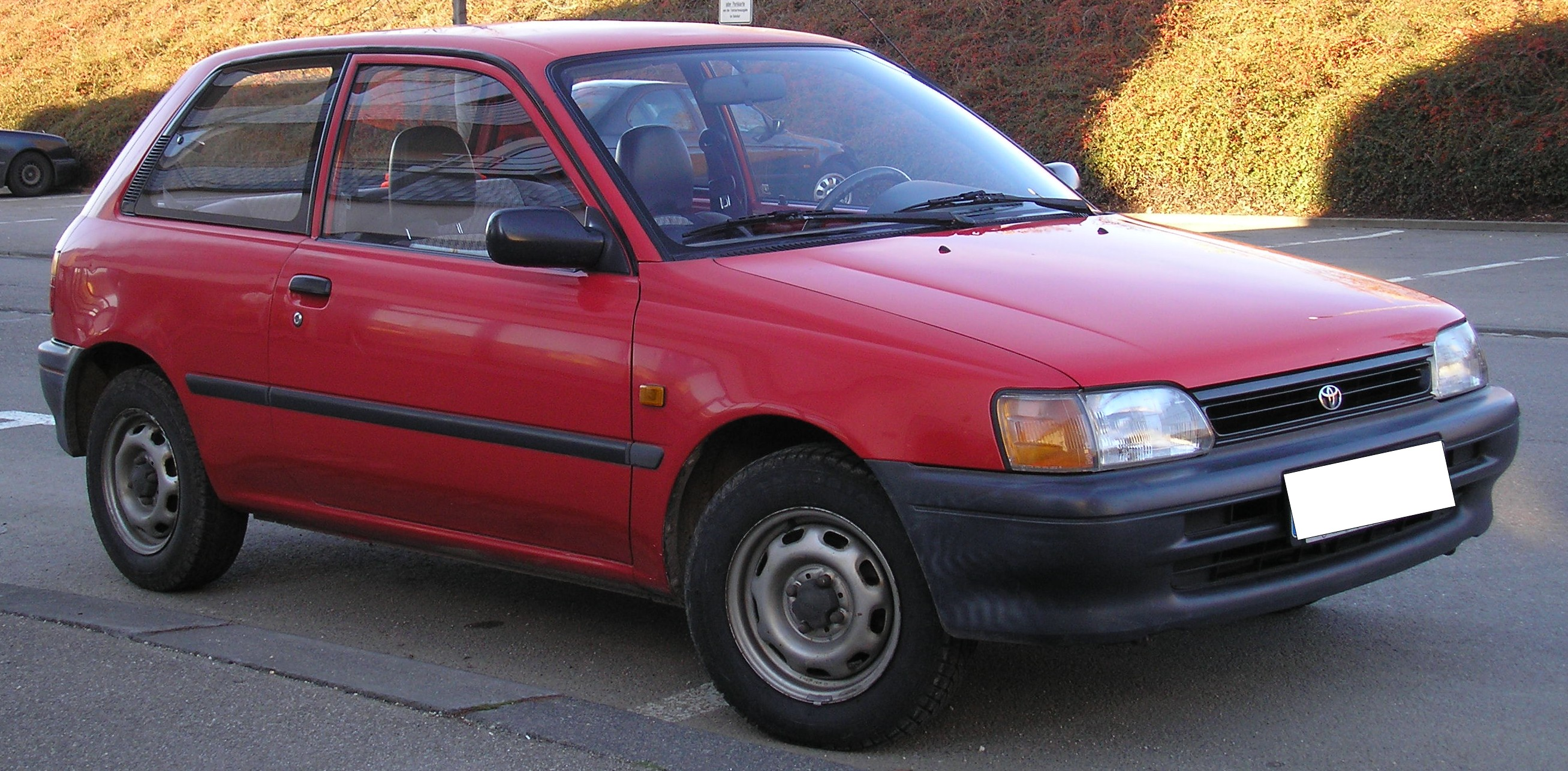
- Pre-facelift Toyota Starlet 1.3 XLi 3-door (EP81, Europe)

Overview
- Model code: P80
- Production: December 1989 – December 1995 (Japan); 1990 – March 1998 (Indonesia)
- Assembly: Japan: Obu, Aichi (Toyota Industries); Indonesia: Jakarta (Multi Astra); Venezuela: Cumana (Toyota de Venezuela)

Body and chassis
- Body style: 3/5-door hatchback
- Layout: Front-engine, front-wheel-drive / four-wheel-drive
- Related: Toyota Sera; Toyota Tercel/Corsa/Corolla II; Toyota Paseo/Cynos

Powertrain
- Engine: 999 cc 1E I4 (EP80); 1295 cc 2E/2E-E I4 (EP81); 1331 cc 4E-F/4E-FE I4 (EP82/85); 1331 cc 4E-FTE turbo I4 (EP82); 1453 cc 1N diesel I4 (NP80)
- Transmission: 4/5-speed manual; 3/4-speed automatic

Dimensions
- Wheelbase: 2,300 mm (90.6 in)
- Length: 3,720–3,740 mm (146.5–147.2 in); 3,800–3,805 mm (149.6–149.8 in) (Gi/GT)
- Width: 1,600 mm (63.0 in); 1,620 mm (63.8 in) (Gi/GT)
- Height: 1,380–1,430 mm (54.3–56.3 in)
- Curb weight: 710–940 kg (1,565.3–2,072.3 lb)

Chronology
- Successor: Toyota Soluna (Indonesia)

The Starlet 80 series was introduced to the Japanese market in December 1989. It featured a more rounded body style and interior. Japanese models received new twin cam engines: 4E-F, 4E-FE and turbocharged 4E-FTE. Export models retained the 1E and 2E engines, and the special version 4E-FE (only for UK and Hong Kong facelift models). The 1N 1.5-litre diesel engine was also available. The Starlet for Japan and Indonesia have a rear center garnish and therefore the license plate is mounted on the bumper. The 80 Series Starlets exported to other destinations have their number plates mounted on the hatch centre panel.

In Japan, the 80 Series Starlet was again offered in a wide range of variants: Soleil, the best selling Soleil L, S, X, X Limited, Si, Canvas Top, the sports model Gi and GT Turbo. The sports model have different bumpers, headlights, and tail lights from the regular models. Sports bucket front seats and a rear spoiler are also standard on the Gi and GT. The GT has a two-mode (low and high) turbo. The Japanese only full-time 4WD models (EP85) were launched in August 1990, and initially offered in Soleil L and X Limited grades.

New Zealand initially received the 3 door 1.0 XL, 1.3 XL and 1.3 S with manual transmission. In March 1993, the automatic only 5 door 1.3 XL was added into the line up. The 2E-engined versions were carburetted and produce 53 kW (72 PS).

The locally assembled Starlet for Indonesia was offered as 1.0 XL, 1.3 SE and 1.3 SE Limited with only 5-speed manual transmission. Only the 1.0 XL was sold in Singapore. All the Starlets officially sold in the Southeast Asian countries were the 5-door models.

The Starlet made its European debut at the 1990 Geneva Motor Show. The 1.3 XLi was the version sold in most European countries. The sporty 1.3 Si was offered in Switzerland. It came with standard sports front seats, three-spoke steering wheel, sunroof, and rear spoiler.

The UK model was the 1.0 GL, only offered as a three-door hatchback, replaced by the 1.3 GLi three-door from 1993 onwards. For 1994, the UK models were 1.3 XLi three-door and 1.3 GLi five-door. All GLi models have a sunroof.

They were some special editions of 80-series sold in Europe such as 1.3 Jeans in the UK and Germany, 1.3 Dance in Switzerland, and 1.3 Westwood in Belgium, all of these are based on the 1.3 XLi. There was also a van model for certain markets where the tax structure suited such a model, without rear seating and often with blanked out windows in the rear. While van versions of earlier Starlets had always been available in Japan, changes in the tax system meant that the fourth generation Starlet was only sold as a passenger car in the home market.

A minor facelift occurred in January 1992, with all Japanese models gaining fuel injection and the discontinuation of the X variant. A new front bumper and revised interior were installed, and the addition of a safety beam inside the doors were added for all models. The S, X Limited, Gi, and GT also gained a new rear center garnish. For the 4WD models, the X Limited was only available as 5-door, the sporty S 4WD replaced the old 3-door X Limited. In Indonesia the new Starlet SE-G replaced the SE Limited. The SE-G has upmarket interior similar to the Japanese X Limited, and shares the redesigned tail-lights and boot garnish with the Gi and GT. For the Hong Kong market, the Japanese model Soleil L 5-door hatchback replaced the old 1.3 XL. The Starlet Canvas Top with folding canvas roof was offered in Hong Kong and certain European countries.

The second minor update was in May 1994 with new front end and tail lights. The full-wide rear garnish was removed. The hatch now has a smooth panel with small garnishes. The Gi and GT featured twin round headlights and mesh grille, also known as "quad" headlights. These minor changes were only extended to Japan, Hong Kong, Indonesia and New Zealand. For the Hong Kong market, the 5-door Soleil L continued, but the Canvas Top Si was removed. The Starlet 1.3 SE and 1.3 SE-G continued in Indonesia, but the 1.0 XL was discontinued. In New Zealand, the sporty 1.3 S was replaced by the new 1.3 GS.

Production in Japan ended in December 1995, but continued in Indonesia until March 1998. The last 80-series in Indonesia was marketed as the "Fantastic Starlet" and nicknamed "turbo look", with sporty bumpers, grille, and bonnet from the Japanese Gi. At the beginning, the Fantastic Starlet was offered in the mid-level SE and top-of-the line SE-G, but later the cheaper model was discontinued.

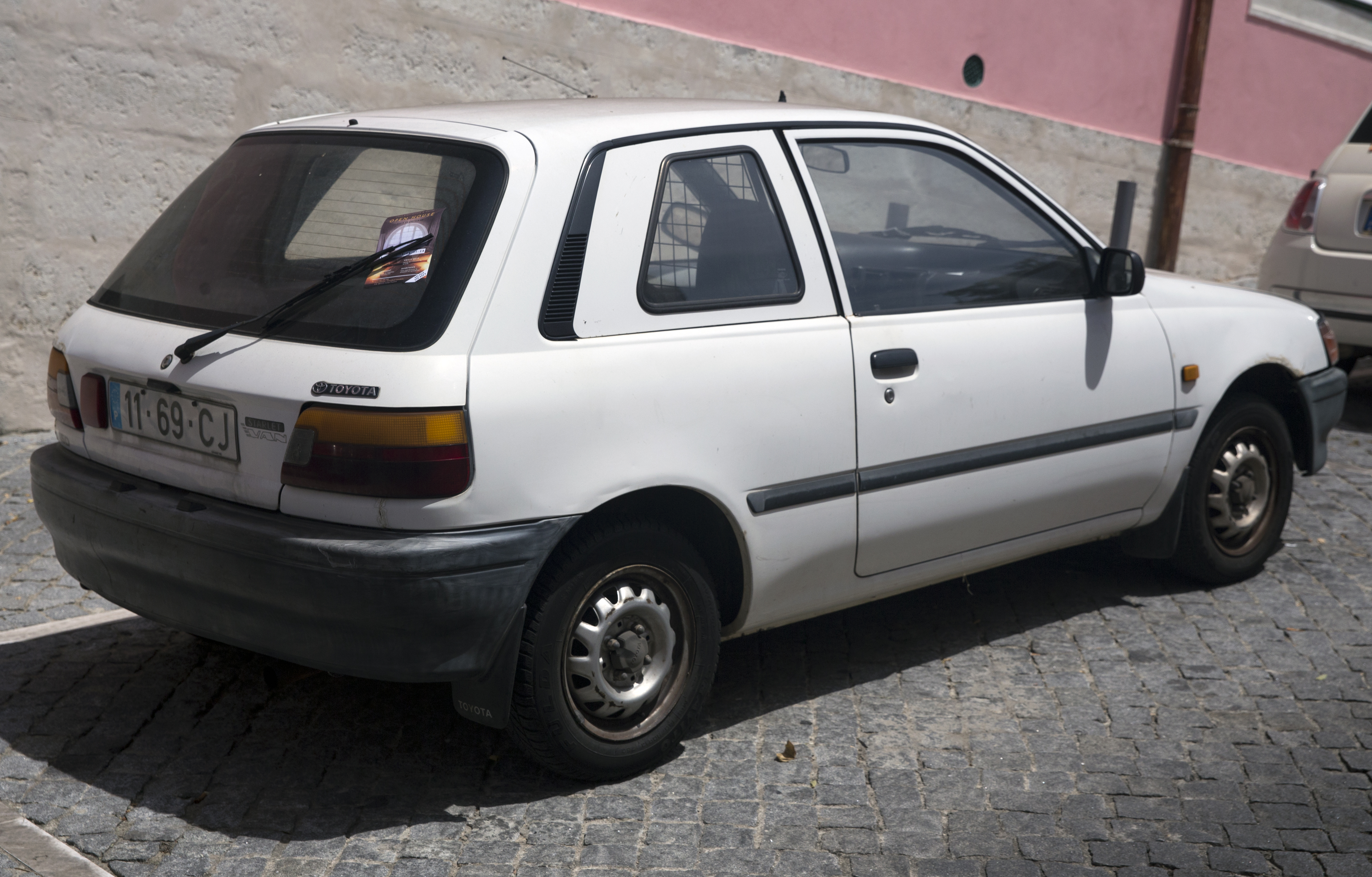
Pre-facelift Toyota Starlet 1.5 D Van (NP80, Portugal)

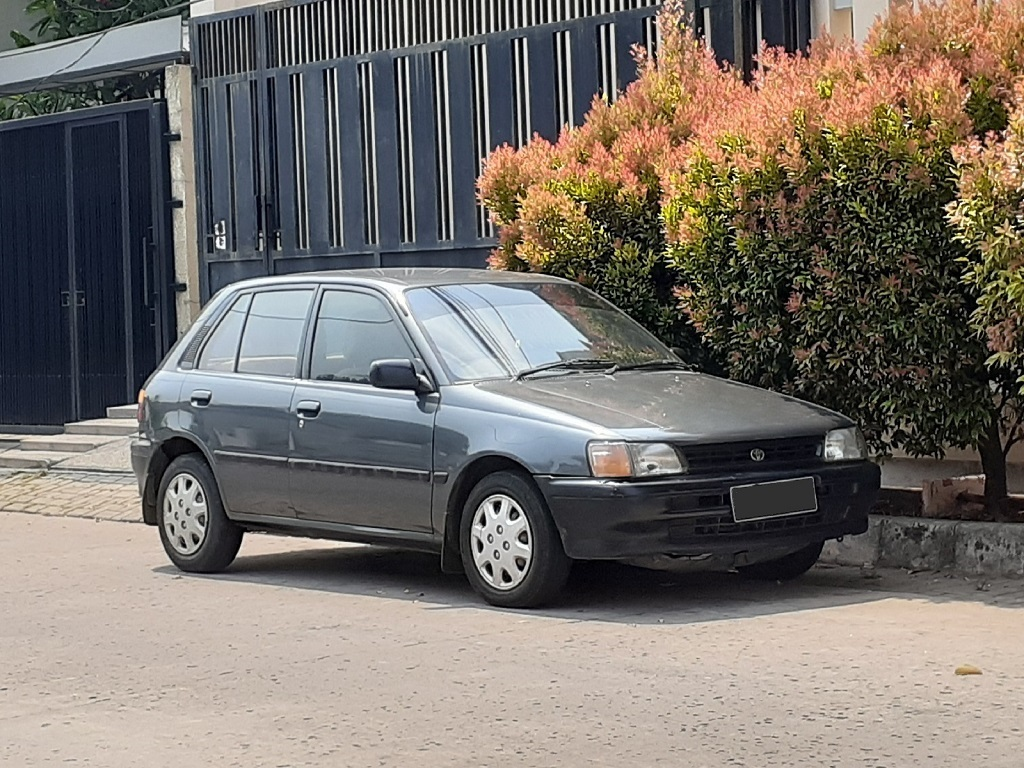
Pre-facelift Starlet 1.3 SE 5-door (EP81, Indonesia)

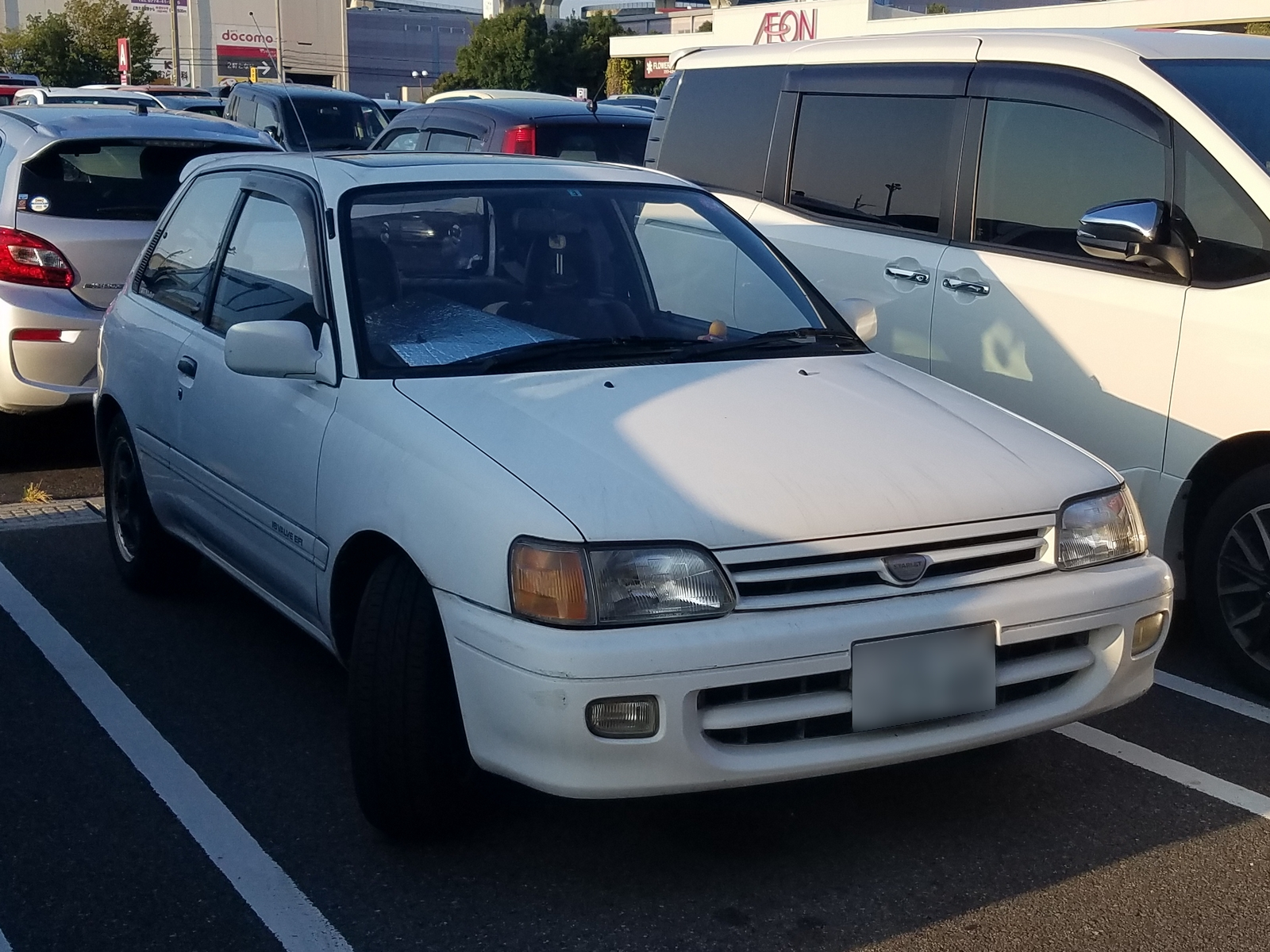
The first facelift Starlet 1.3 S 3-door (EP82, Japan)

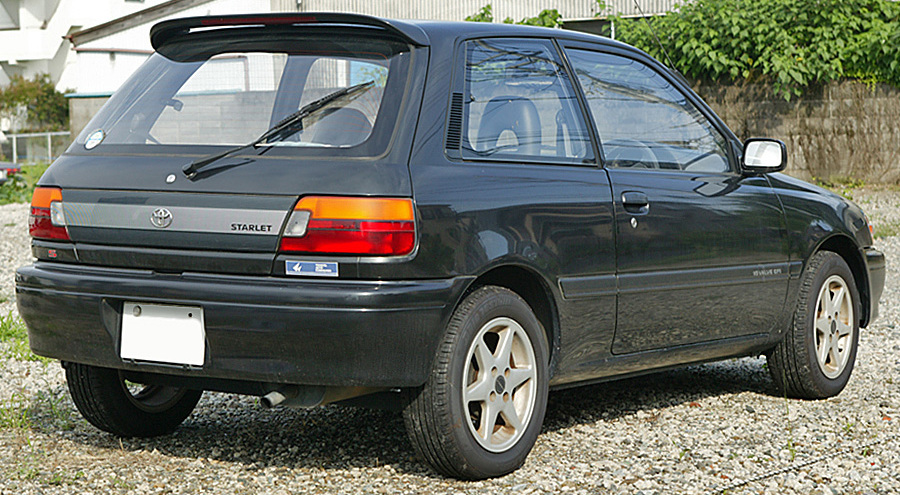
The first facelift Starlet 1.3 S 3-door (EP82, Japan)

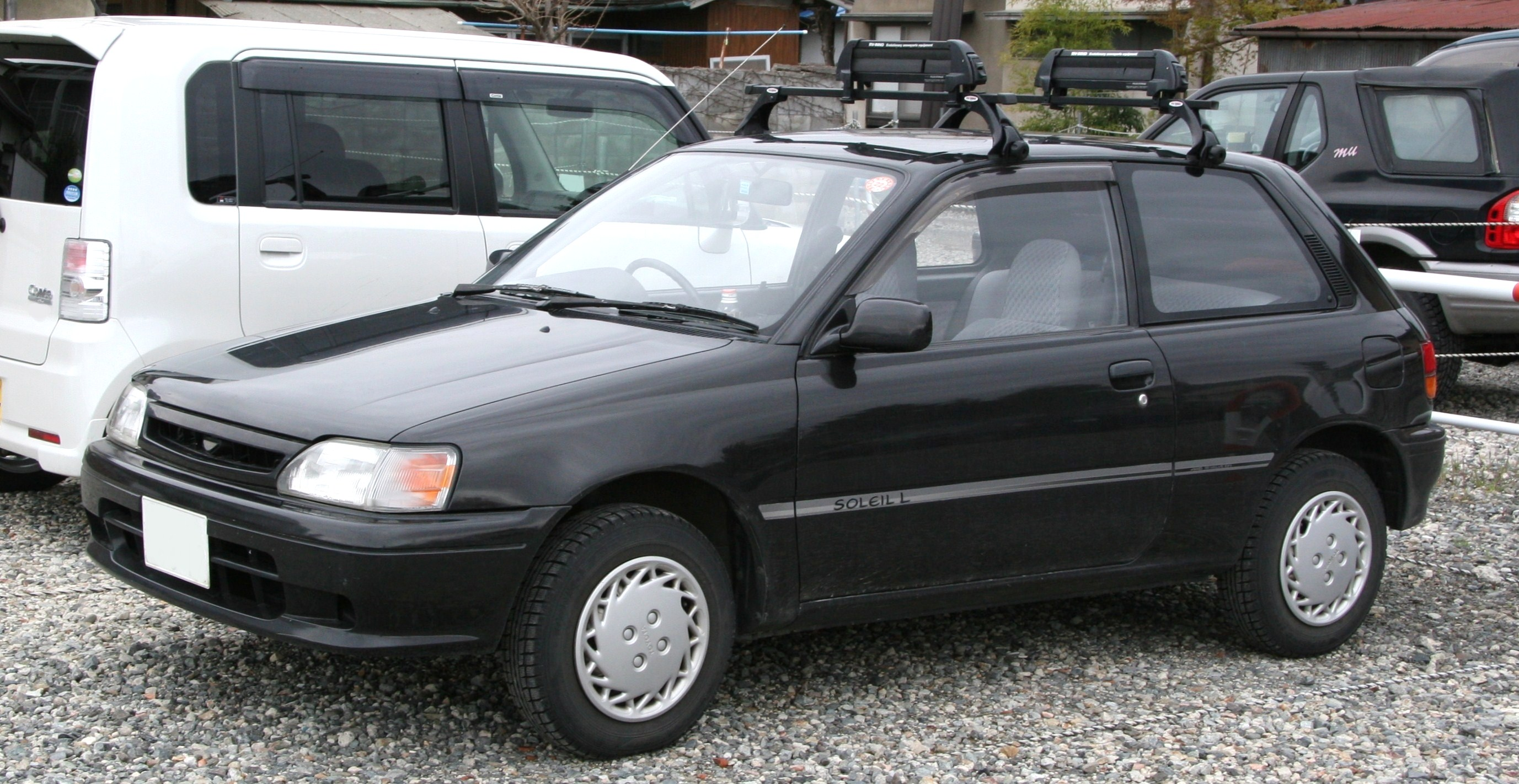
The second facelift model Starlet Soleil L 3-door (EP82, Japan)

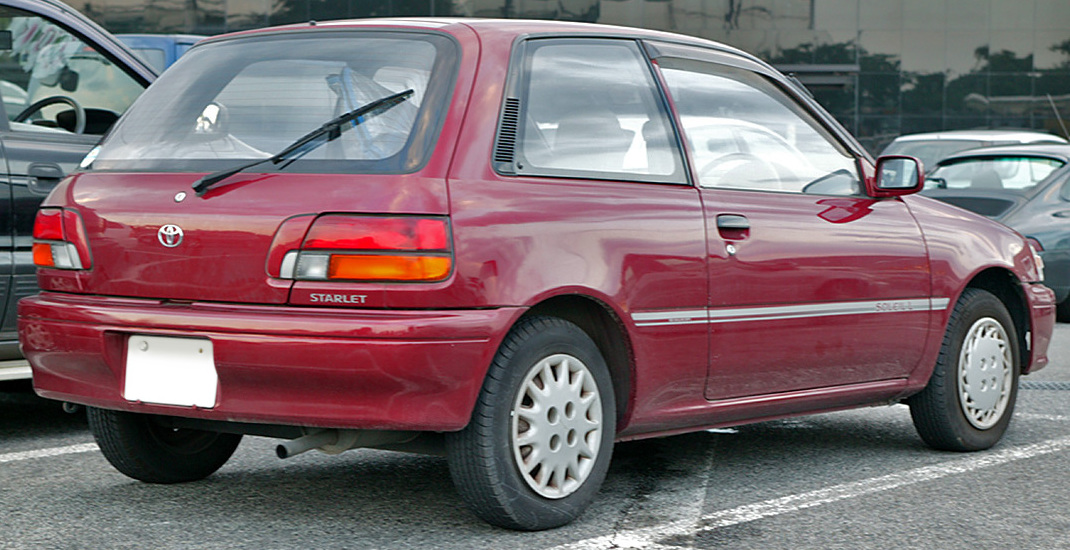
The second facelift model Starlet 1.3 Soleil L 3-door (EP82, Japan)

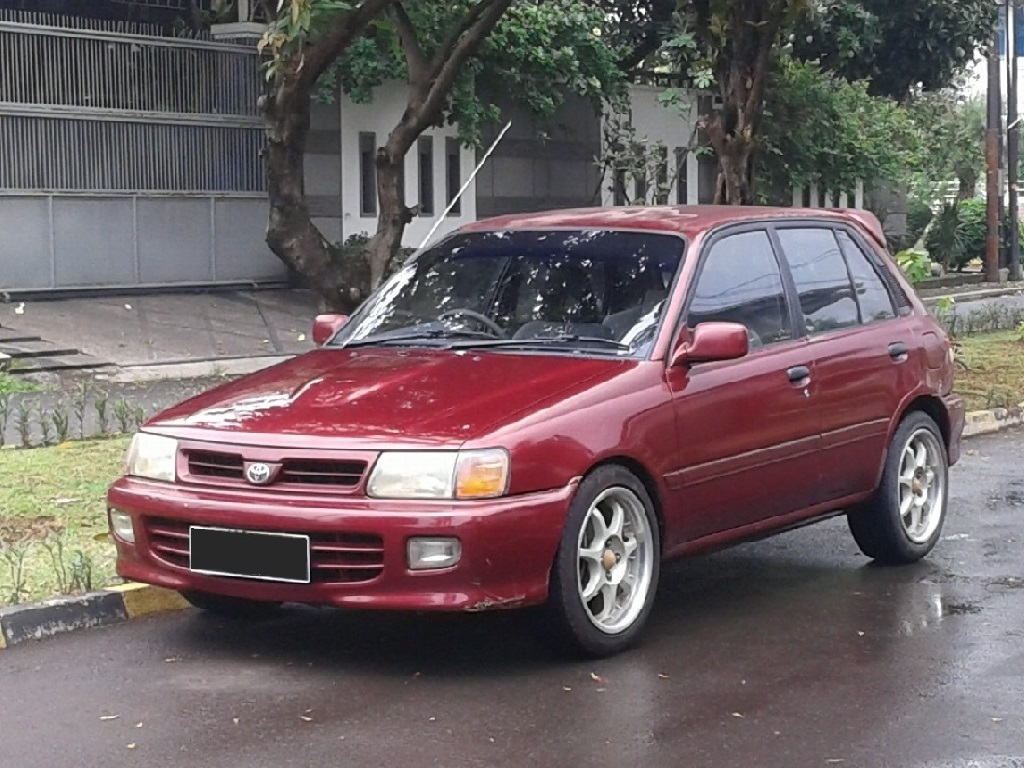
The third facelift 1996 "Fantastic Starlet" 1.3 SE-G 5-door (EP81), exclusively for Indonesian market only with facelifted JDM "Gi" bumpers and bonnet.

=== GT Turbo ===
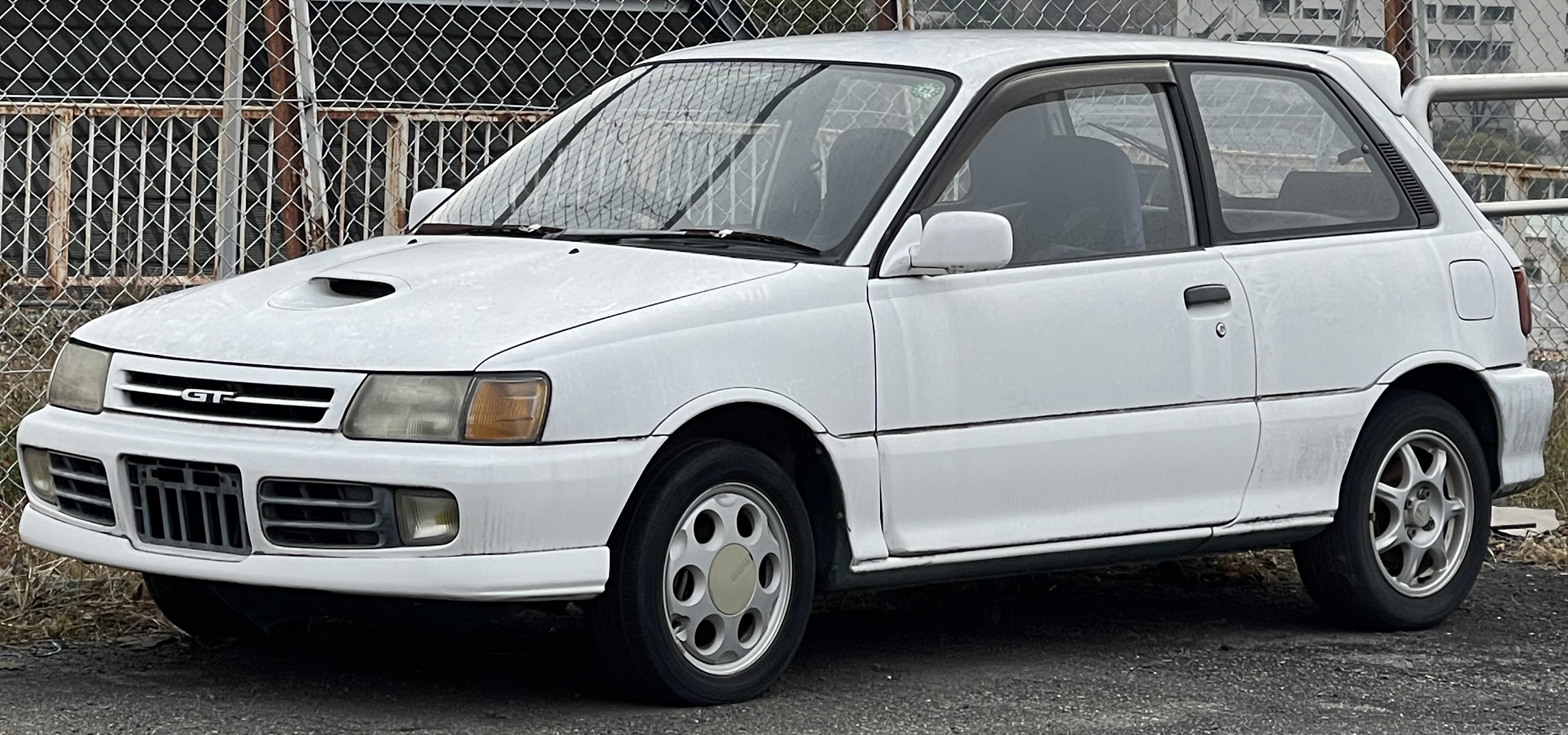
Pre-facelift Starlet GT Turbo (Japan)

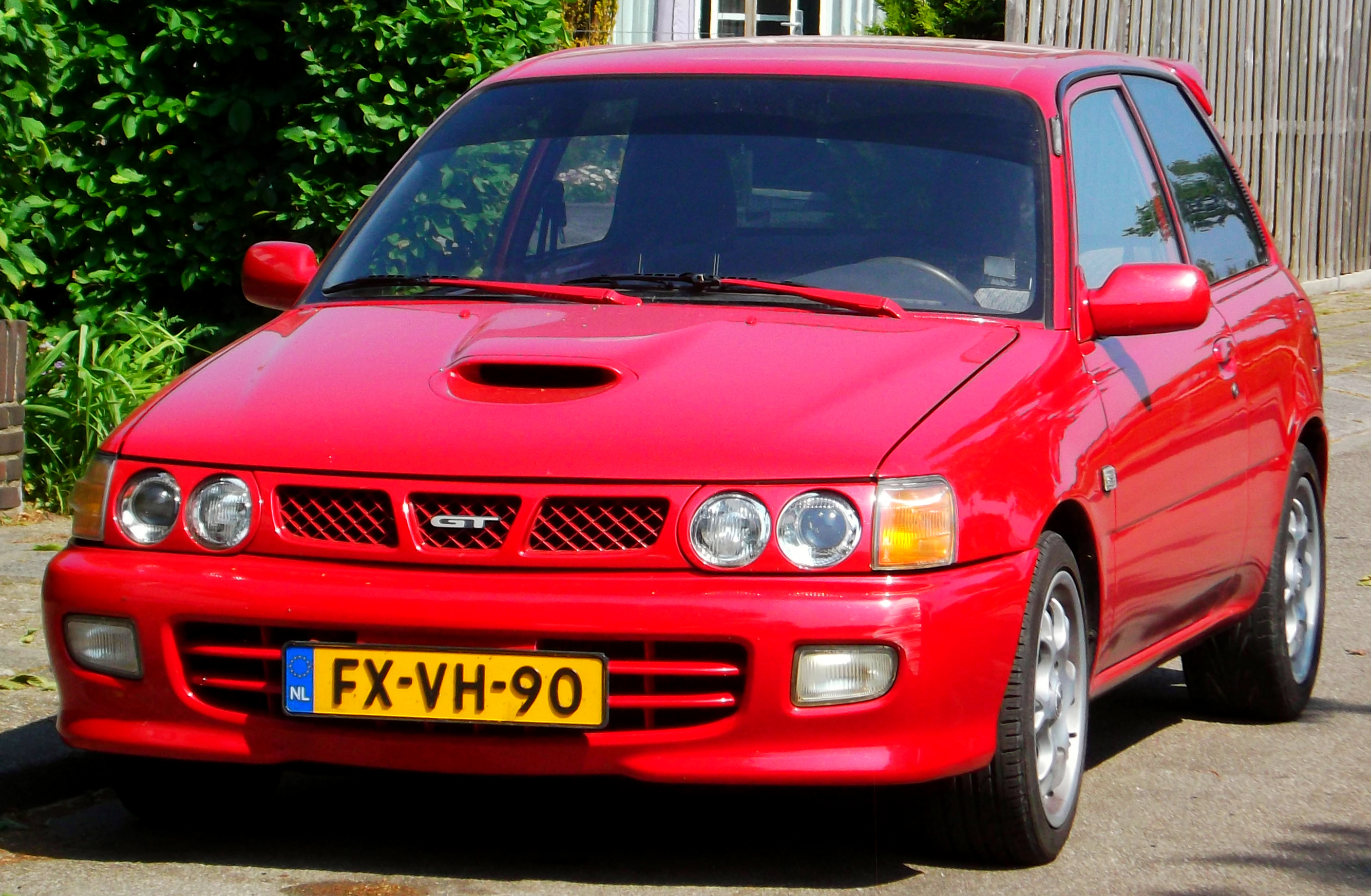
European-spec Starlet converted into second facelift GT Turbo (The Netherlands)

The Starlet GT Turbo is a high-performance model of the fourth-generation Starlet, first introduced in 1990 as a successor to the 70 series Starlet 1.3 Turbo R. The EP82 GT Turbo was powered by a turbocharged version of a Toyota's E Engine, the 4E-FTE with a CT9 turbocharger. This engine produced 135 PS (99 kW) at 6,400 rpm. The car weighed in at 890 kilograms (1,962 lb), providing a greater than 100 kilowatt per tonne power-to-weight ratio. Adding to its handling abilities, Toyota's active suspension technology continued from the previous generation, called TEMS.

As with other Japanese market Starlets, the GT Turbo received minor changes in January 1992 which included new front bumpers and rear combination lamps with full-length red center garnish. The optional 14-inch alloy wheels were also restyled.

The second minor change was given in May 1994, this time with four round quad headlights combined with the mesh grille. The tail-lights remained the same, but the full-length center garnish was replaced by the small ones on each side.

Production of the car ended in December 1995, but the popularity of the car is still maintained by a cult of drivers, mainly as a used import. The Starlet GT Turbo and the normally aspirated 1.3 Gi were replaced by the Starlet Glanza series, the Glanza V and Glanza S respectively.

Two limited edition versions of the GT Turbo were produced, the GT Limited and the GT Advance. Both feature small changes such as different steering wheels and gear shifter knobs, a rear strut bar, ABS (on later versions only) and were distinguishable by their two-tone paint scheme. These models also featured an optional limited-slip differential (LSD) which was available with the C153 transaxle.

== Fifth generation (P90; 1996) ==
Fifth generation
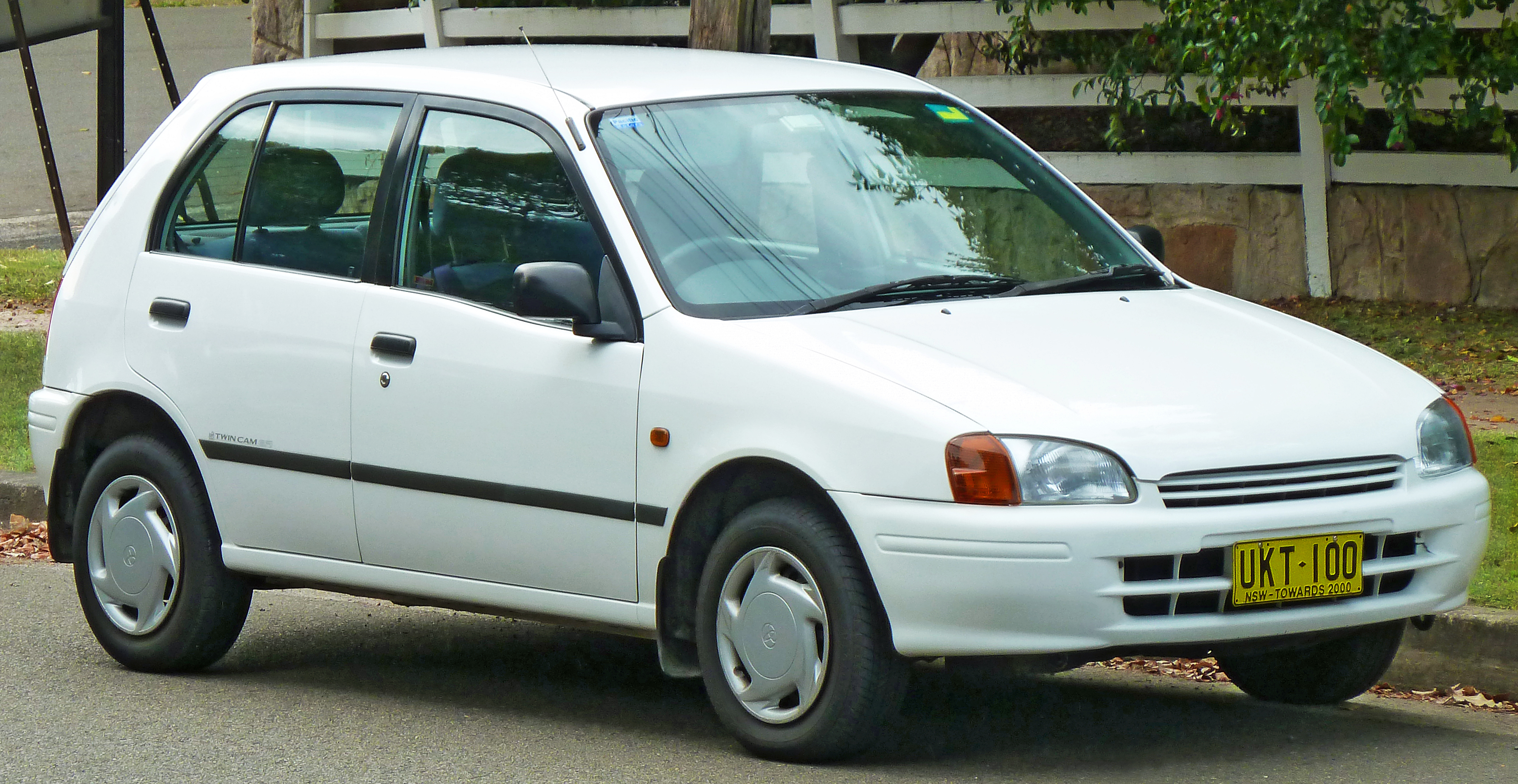
- 1996–1997 Toyota Starlet Style 5-door (EP91, Australia)

Overview
- Model code: P90
- Production: January 1996 – July 1999
- Assembly: Japan: Obu, Aichi (Toyota Industries)

Body and chassis
- Body style: 3/5-door hatchback
- Layout: Front-engine, front-wheel-drive / four-wheel-drive
- Related: Toyota Tercel; Toyota Paseo

Powertrain
- Engine: 1295 cc 2E I4; 1331 cc 4E-FE I4; 1331 cc 4E-FTE turbo I4; 1453 cc 1N diesel I4
- Transmission: 4/5-speed manual; 3/4-speed automatic

Dimensions
- Wheelbase: 2,300 mm (90.6 in)
- Length: 3,750–3,790 mm (147.6–149.2 in)
- Width: 1,625 mm (64.0 in)
- Height: 1,400–1,415 mm (55.1–55.7 in)

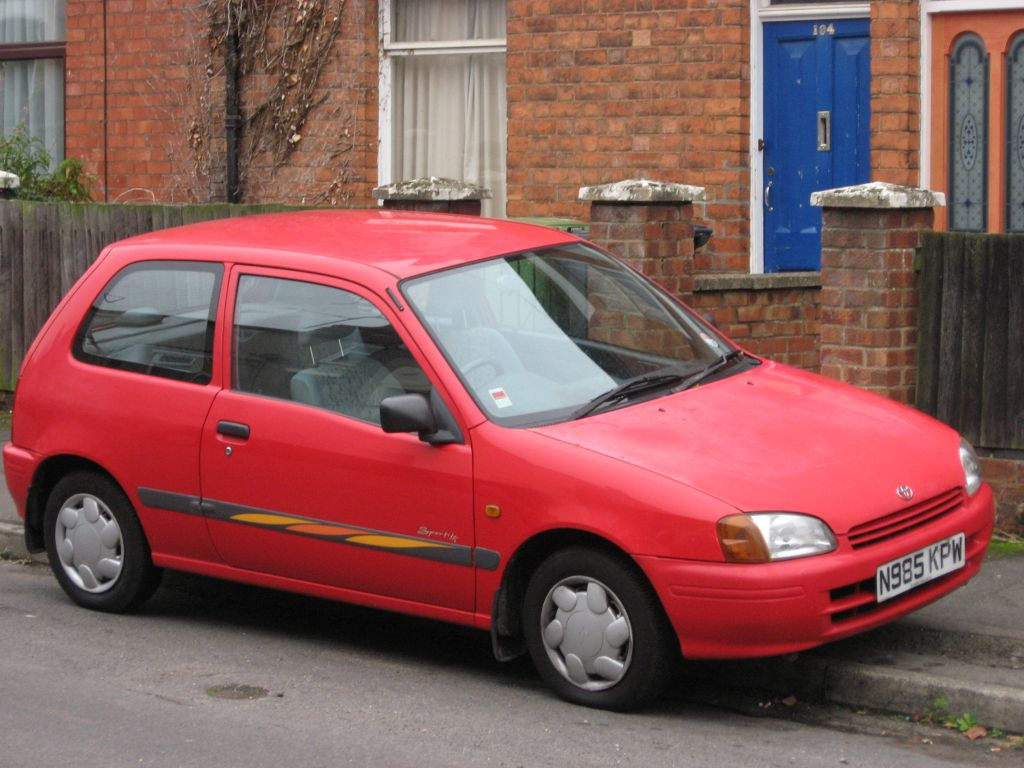
Toyota Starlet 1.3 Sportif 3-door (EP81, UK)

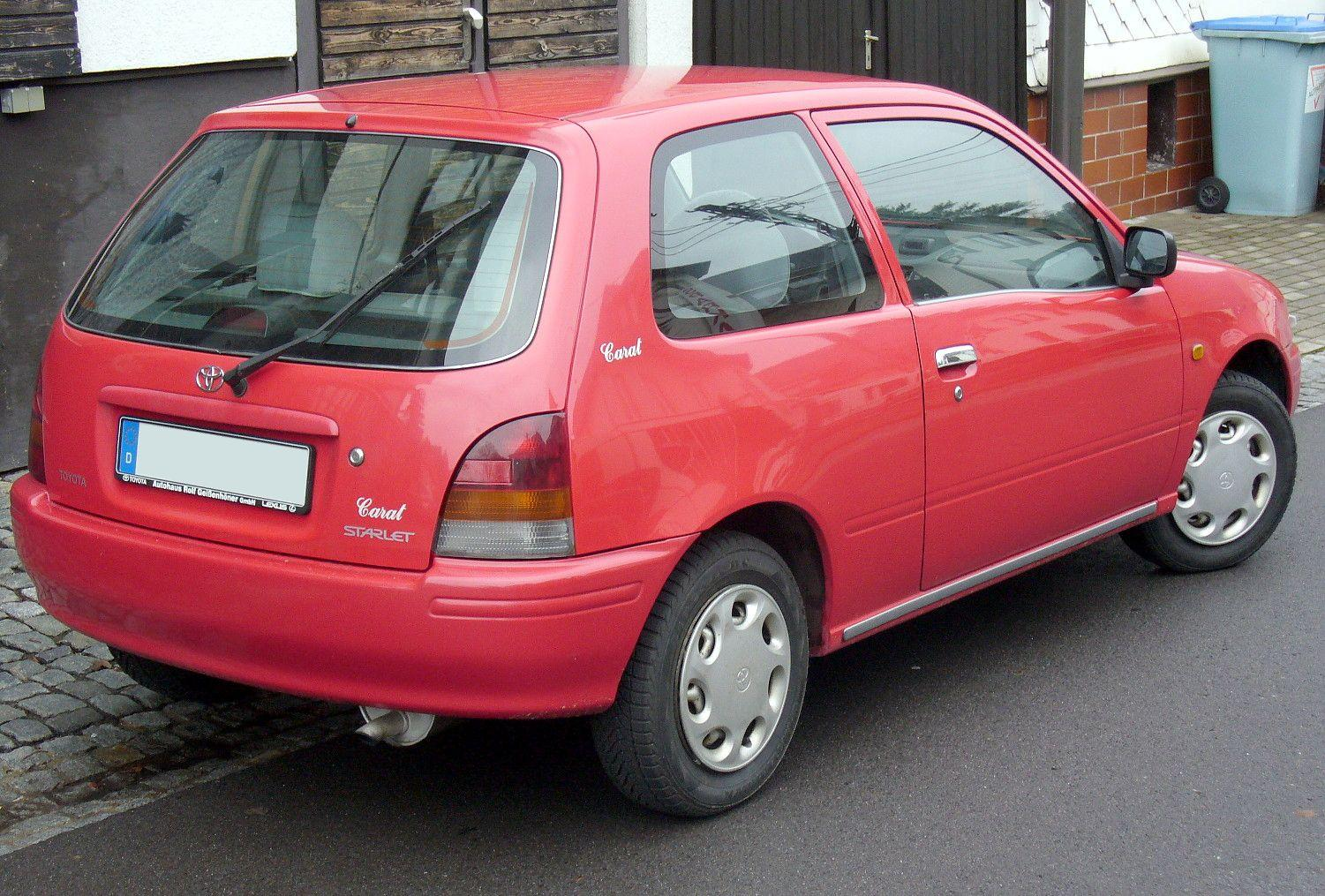
Toyota Starlet 1.3 Carat 3-door (EP91, Germany)

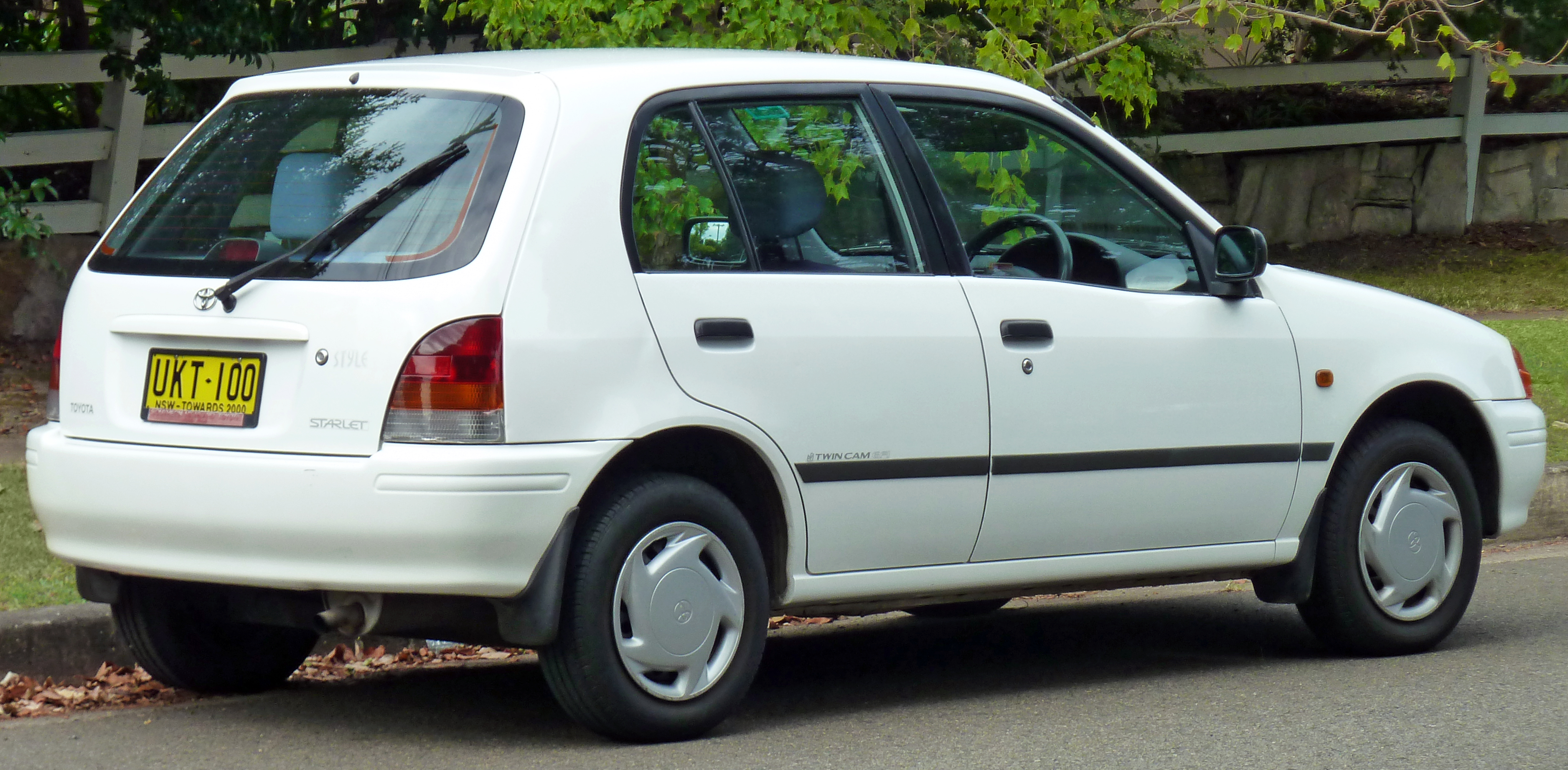
1996–1997 Toyota Starlet Style 5-door (EP91, Australia)

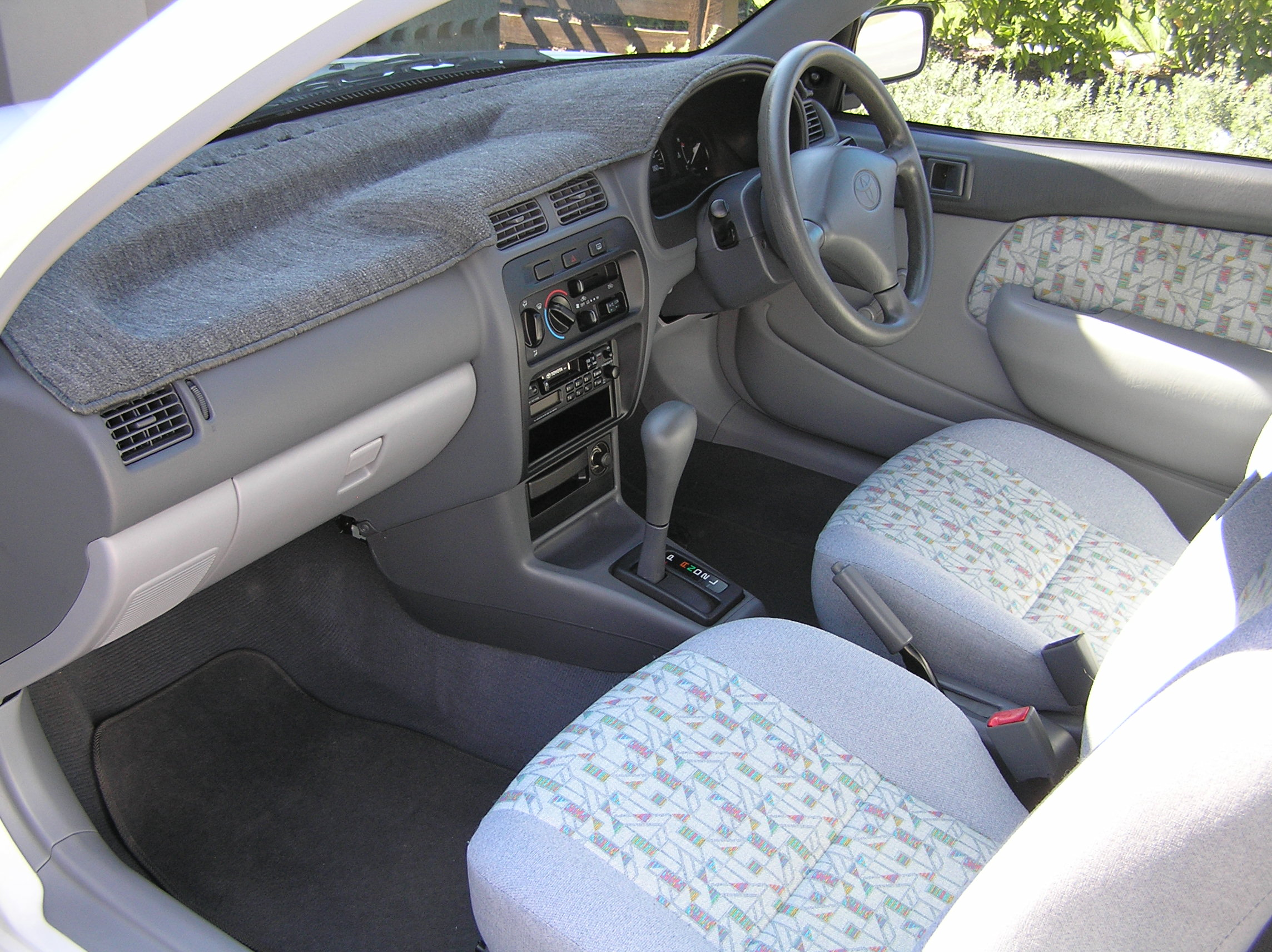
Interior

The Starlet 90 series, introduced in 1996, retained the same three- or five-door hatchback ideas. The unique design is a sloped-down belt line on the front doors. The Japanese versions were divided into three models: Reflet (normal), Glanza (sports) and Carat (more luxurious). The Reflet (Base, f, and x), the Carat, and the Glanza S were powered by the 4E-FE engine. The Base model was also offered with the 1N Diesel engine. Based on the five-door Reflet, the Starlet Remix came with a rugged SUV style. It has body cladding, roof rails, and a spare tyre mounted on the back.

The 90-series Starlet shared its platform with the Paseo including suspension, engine, and many other components. The RHD Starlet received its own dashboard design with slightly higher center AC outlets, while the LHD version shares its dashboard with Tercel and Paseo.

The Starlet EP91 came to Europe in the second quarter of 1996. Although basically, all European models were 1.3 XLi with a 75 PS (55 kW) version of the 4E-FE engine, they were marketed under different model grades across Europe. Initially, the UK models were the base 1.3 Sportif and the upmarket 1.3 CD (with standard CD-player and sunroof). In 1998, the UK lineup was revised with base 1.3 S, sporty 1.3 SR (with lowered suspension, spoiler, and sport exhaust), and loaded 1.3 GLS. The French models were Base, GL, and GLS. In Switzerland, the upgraded model similar to GLS is called 1.3 Crystal, while in Norway is called SLi. All of high-grade models have driver's side SRS airbag, tachometer, front power windows, rear headrests, and coloured bumpers. ABS and Sunroof were optional. In Belgium, available trim levels were XS and XT, with the XT featuring a center console, power steering, full wheel covers, and body-coloured bumpers as standard over the XS. The XT model also had more available optional extras, such as a power sunroof, ABS, and "Comfort Pack" (power-operated front windows, central locking, immobilizer, tachometer, and 3 additional outboard grab handles).

The only generation sold new in Australia, the EP91 Starlet was available from March 1996 to December 1999, originally under three trim levels, the base three-door Life, sporty three-door Group X and luxury five-door Style. In 1997, a five-door version of the Life was introduced. During 1998, the Group X and Style models were dropped, and the Life gained a driver's airbag as standard equipment. When first sold in Australia, the Starlet suffered from higher pricing in its category, but sold well later on after Toyota entered a small-car price cut war, competing against the Hyundai Excel and Ford Festiva.

Minor changes with new front bumpers, grille, tail lights and revised interior fabric were new for 1998 Japanese market models. Production of the Starlet ended in July 1999, just after the launch of the Yaris.

This model was not offered for the Indonesian market; the previous EP81 Starlet was instead succeeded by the Soluna sedan in 2000. At the time, Toyota's hatchback segment in Indonesia went into hiatus until 2006, when the second-generation Yaris was introduced and marketed as a spiritual successor of the Starlet.

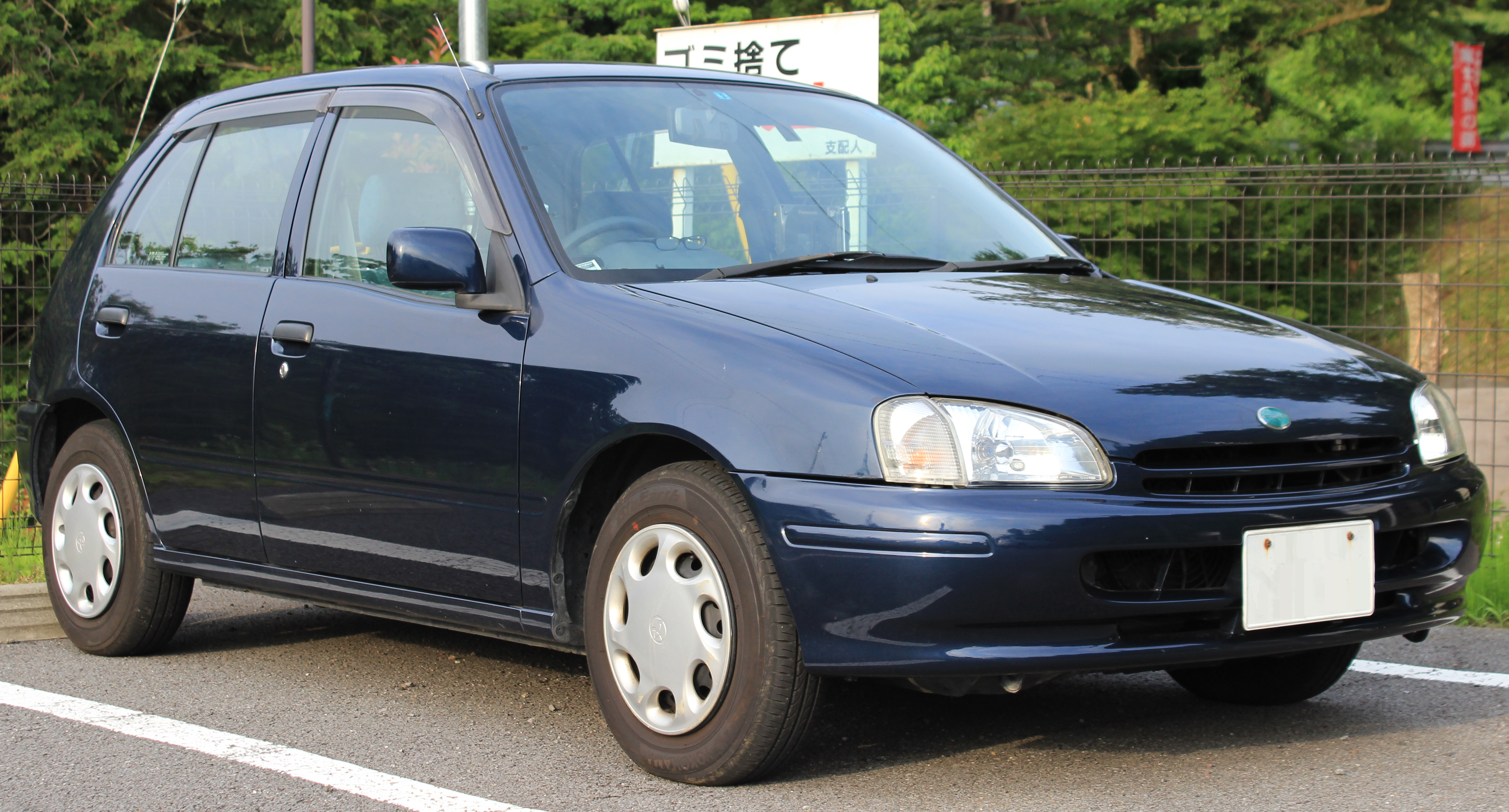
Starlet 1.3 Reflet f Limited (EP91; facelift, Japan)

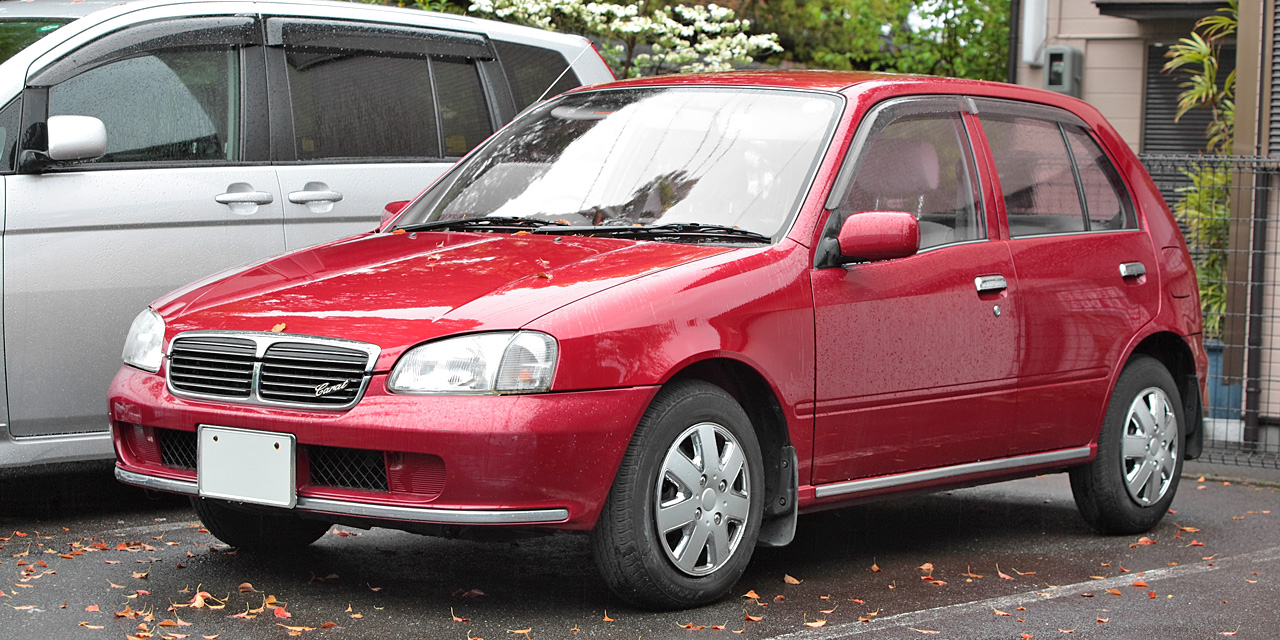
Starlet 1.3 Carat 5 door (EP91, Japan)

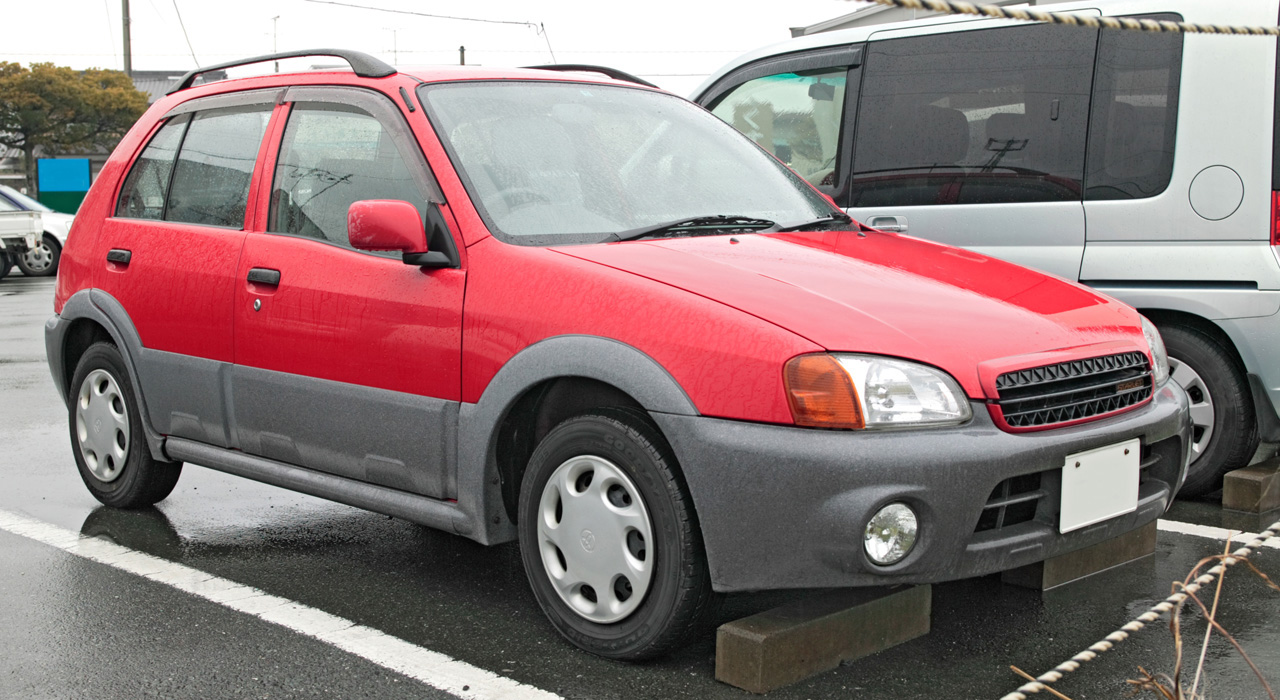
Starlet 1.3 Remix (EP91, Japan)

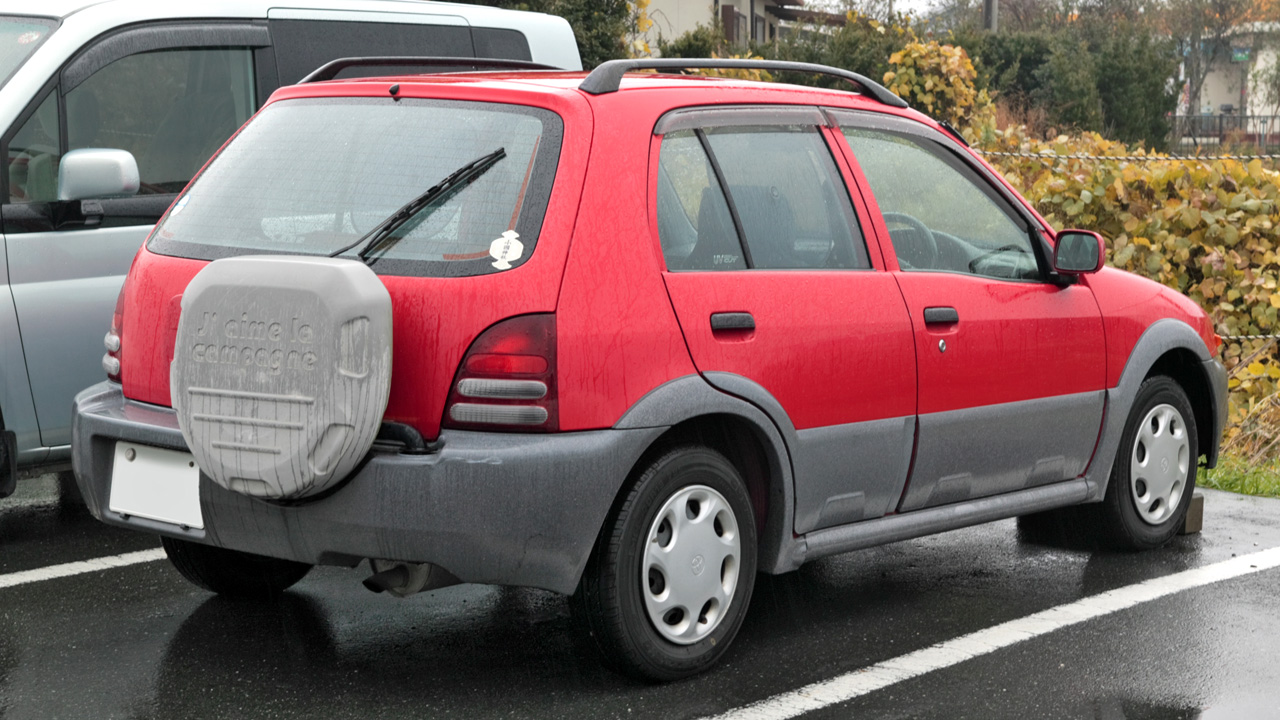
Starlet 1.3 Remix (EP91, Japan)

=== Glanza ===
The Starlet Glanza is the sports version of the P90 generation Starlet, and is the successor to the 80 series naturally aspirated Starlet 1.3 Gi and Starlet GT Turbo. The Glanza S was powered by the naturally aspirated 1331 cc 4E-FE and the Glanza V was powered by the turbocharged 1331 cc 4E-FTE. The 4E-FE used in the Glanza S generated 85 PS (63 kW; 84 hp). The turbocharged 4E-FTE used in the Glanza V generated 135 PS (99 kW; 133 hp) at 6400 rpm. Viscous coupling Limited-Slip Differential (LSD) and rear triangle performance rod or strut bar were factory options for the Glanza V.

In December 1996, the Glanza S Limited was released. It has standard body kits same as Glanza V Turbo except the scooped-bonnet and the engine did not have a Turbo. A lightweight version of the Glanza V was also available without air conditioner and electric windows to keep the car as light as possible, being intended for competitive usage.

While the Glanza S and Glanza V were only officially available on the Japanese market, many used private imports have made their way to the UK, New Zealand, and many other right-hand drive markets.

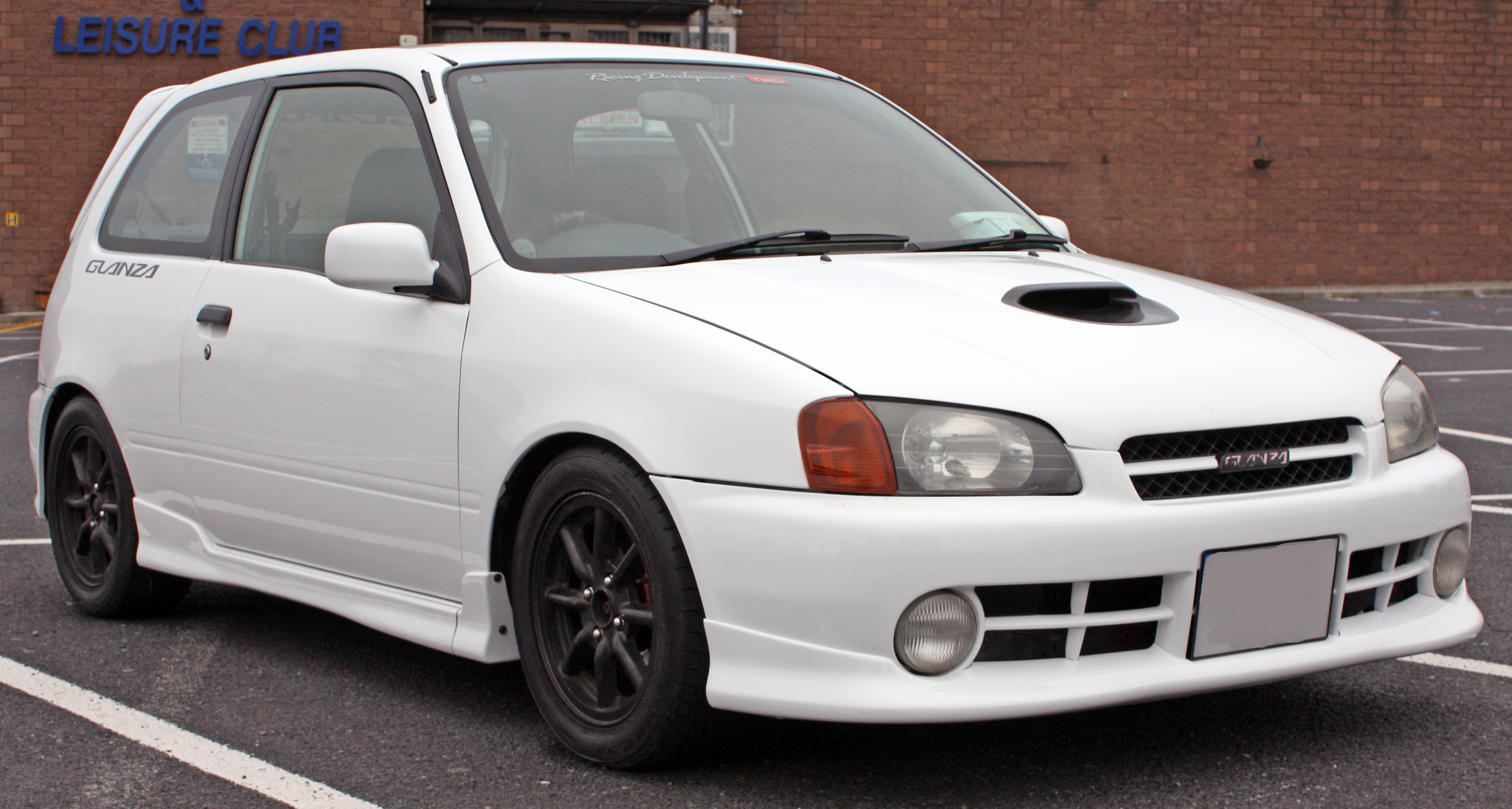
Toyota Starlet 1.3 Glanza V Turbo (EP91, Japan)

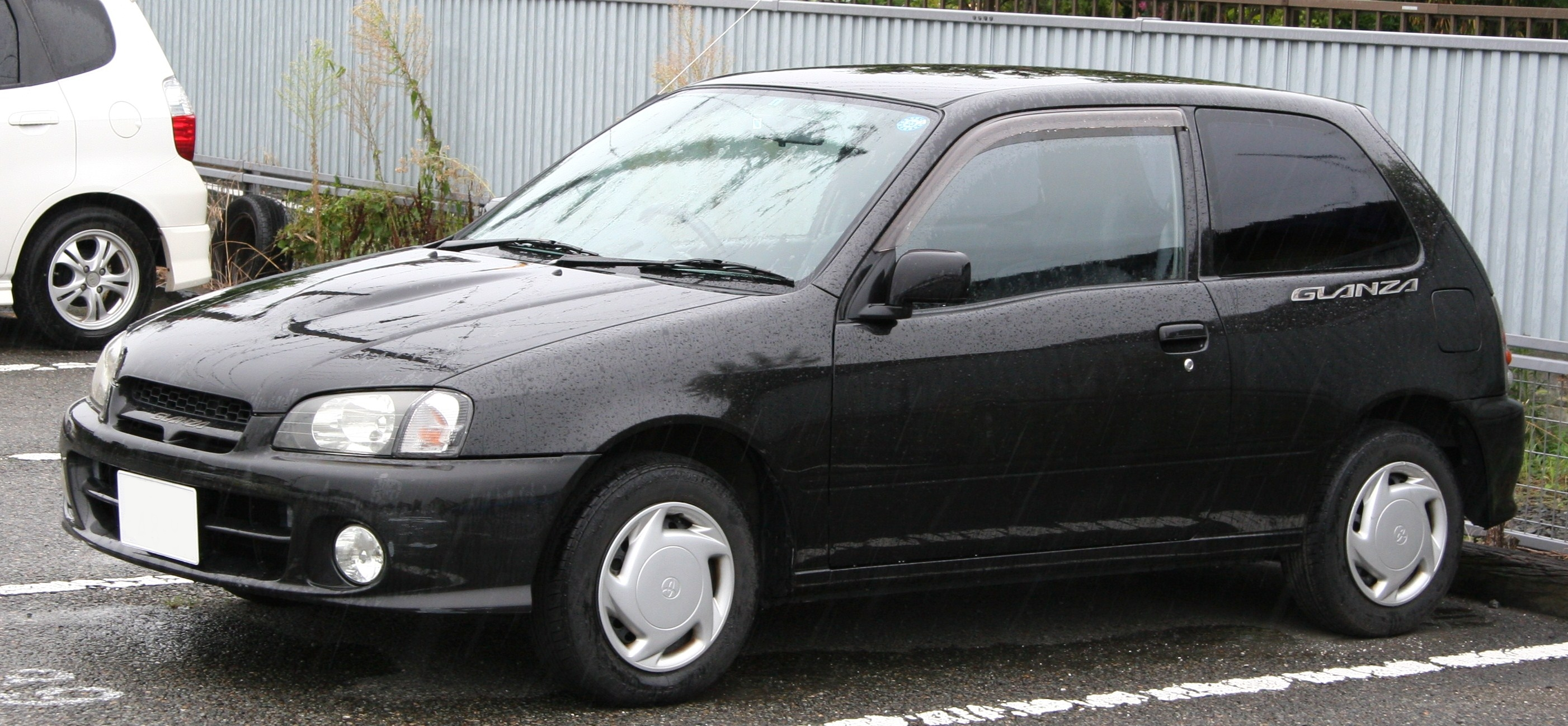
Toyota Starlet 1.3 Glanza S (EP91; facelift, Japan)

== Suzuki Baleno-based models ==
The "Glanza" nameplate was revived in June 2019 for the rebadged Indian market Suzuki Baleno hatchback. The vehicle was released through a partnership with Indian automobile manufacturer Maruti Suzuki. The Glanza is also sold in Africa since September 2020 under the revived Starlet nameplate.

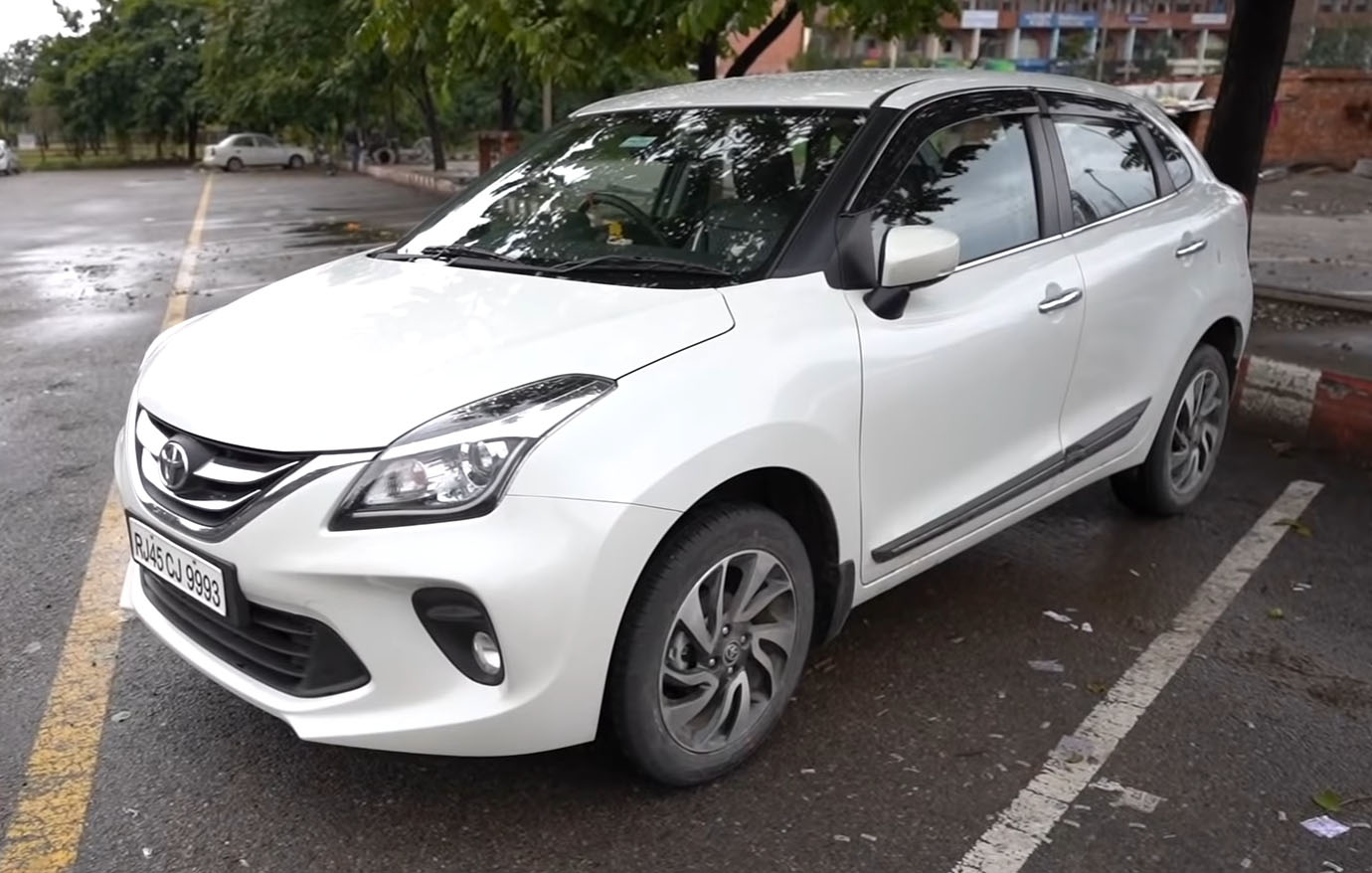
2019–2022 Toyota Glanza

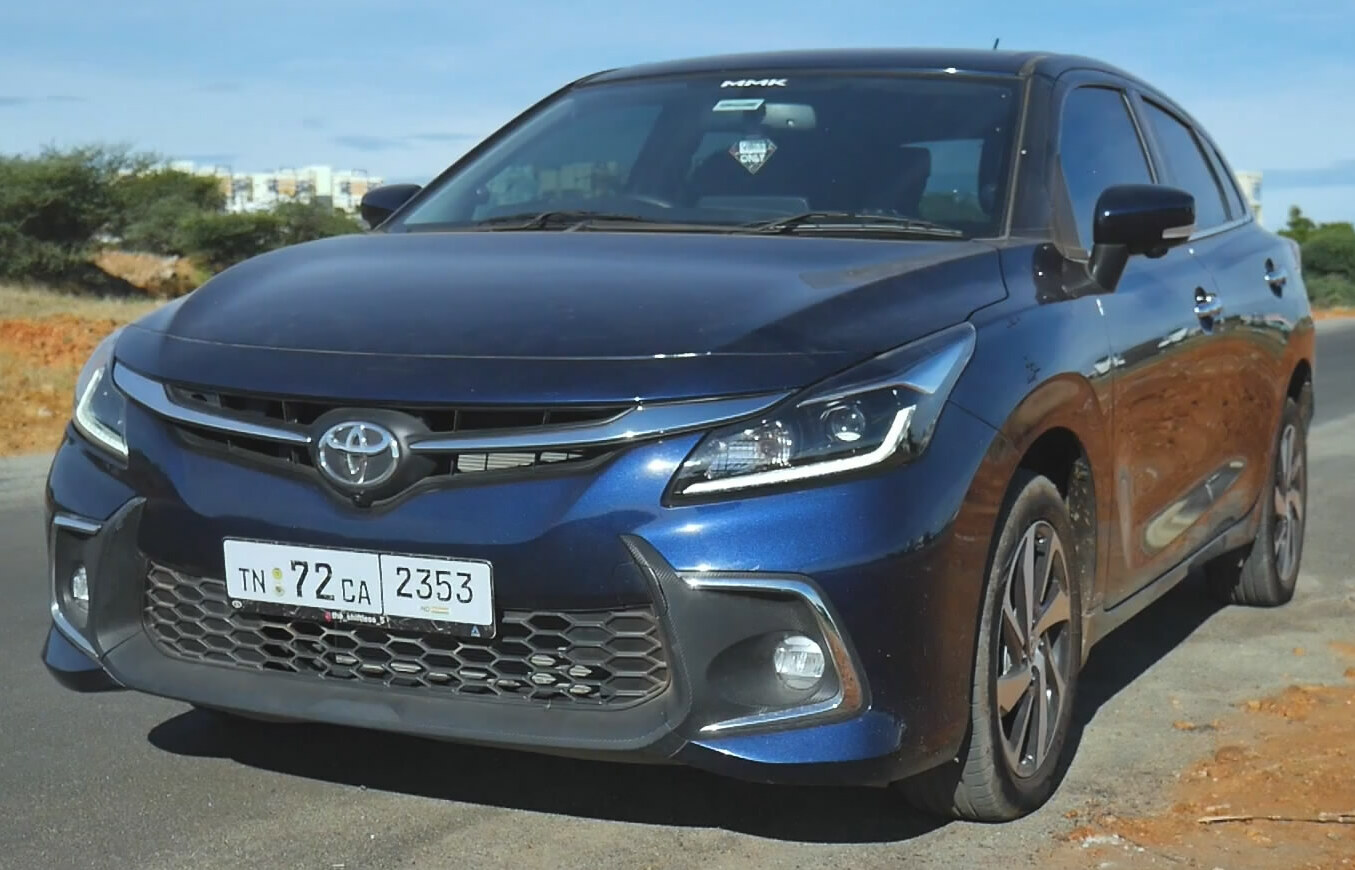
2022–present Glanza

== Motorsports ==
The Starlet EP81 participated in the WRC Acropolis Rally in Greece, and won the A5 class in the 1994 event. The EP71, EP82, and EP91 Starlet also competed in the Starlet One Make Race in Japan. The EP81 participated in the Indonesian Touring Car Championship, and rallies in the Caribbean.

Preceded by Publica	Toyota Starlet; 1973–1999	Succeeded by Vitz
