= Sera =

Sera may refer to:

== People ==
- Sera (singer) (born 1994), Dutch singer
- Sera Cahoone (born 1975), American singer and musician
- Ryu Sera (born 1987), South Korean singer

== Places ==
- Sera, Hiroshima, a town in Japan
- Sera District, Hiroshima
- Sera Monastery, Lhasa, Tibet

== Media ==
- Será (album), a 2008 album by Presuntos Implicados
- Sera, 1995 album by Valery Meladze
- Sera (Robotech character), a fictional character from the television series Robotech
- "Será", a 1979 song by José José from the album Si Me Dejas Ahora
- "Será", a 1985 song by Legião Urbana from the album Legião Urbana
- "Será", a 1990 song by Franco de Vita from the album Extranjero
- "Será", a 1991 song by Ricardo Montaner
- Sera, a character in the 1995 drama Leaving Las Vegas, played by Elisabeth Shue
- "Será", a 2004 song by Lu from the album Lu
- "Será", a 2006 song by Sin Bandera from the album Pasado
- Sera, the fictional planet upon which the video game series Gears of War is set
- Sera, a protagonist from the Shin Megami Tensei: Digital Devil Saga series
- Sera (Dragon Age), a character in the 2014 video game Dragon Age: Inquisition
- Sera, a character from Doubutsu Sentai Zyuohger, a Japanese television series

== Acronyms ==
- Sierra Northern Railway, which has the reporting mark SERA
- Single European Railway Area, an area inside the European Union where the European Train Control System is in use
- Suburban Electric Railway Association, based at the Electric Railway Museum, Warwickshire, England
- Socialist Environment and Resources Association, an independent campaign group affiliated with the United Kingdom Labour Party
- Southern Education and Research Alliance (South Africa)
- Standardised European Rules of the Air is a European Regulation on flying and air traffic control
- Strengthening Emergency Response Abilities (SERA) Project or simply Strengthening Emergency Response Abilities Project (Ethiopia)

== Other uses ==
- Sera language, an Austronesian language of Papua New Guinea
- Sera (company), a German-based manufacturer of fish foods and other aquarium accessories
- Toyota Sera, a small 2+2 coupe built solely for the Japanese market

== See also ==
- Sara (disambiguation)
- Sarah
- Serra (disambiguation)
- Serum (disambiguation)
- Que sera (disambiguation)
