= Sero =

Sero may refer to:

== Places ==
- Sero, Ethiopia, a village in Tigray Region, Ethiopia
- Sero, Iran, a city in West Azerbaijan Province, Iran
- Sero, Mali, a town in Sero Diamanou, Mali
- Sero Blanco, a town on the island of Aruba
- Sero Diamanou, a commune in Mali
- Santa Cruz de la Seros, a village in the province of Huesca, Spain

== People ==
- Aghinetti (also called Guccio del Sero), Italian painter of the 14th century
- Sero Khanzadyan, Armenian writer
- Nicolás Mezquida Sero (b. 1992), Uruguayan football player

== Other uses ==
- Sero Hiki no Goshu (or Gauche the Cellist), Japanese anime
- Şero, a celebrity cat and mascot of the Turkish Republican People's Party
- The Sero, the TV from Samsung

== As an acronym (SERO) ==
- SERO (Separating Employee Retention Offer), a Sprint PCS rate plan option for separating Sprint employees and Advantage Club subscribers
- Sports Car Endurance Race Operation, part of endurance racing
- Southeastern Regional Office, part of the National Park Service in the United States

== See also ==
- Seròs a municipality Catalonia, Spain
- Serro (disambiguation)
- Serra (disambiguation)
- Serow, a type of hoofed mammal
- Cero (disambiguation)
