= Serra =

Serra (Latin for "saw") may refer to:

== People and fictional characters ==
- Serra (surname), a list of people and fictional characters
- Serra (given name), a list of people and fictional characters
- Serra (footballer), Portuguese footballer José Carvalho Gonçalves (born 1961)

== Cities, towns, municipalities ==
=== Brazil ===
- Serra, Espírito Santo, a city in the Greater Vitória area
- Serra Azul, in São Paulo
- Serra do Navio, in Amapá
- Serra do Navio, in Amapá
- Serra Negra, in São Paulo
- Serra Talhada, in Pernambuco

=== Italy ===
- La Serra, San Miniato, in Tuscany
- Serra (Rocca Santa Maria), in Abruzzo
- Serra d'Aiello, in Calabria
- Serra de' Conti, in Marche
- Serra Pedace, in Calabria
- Serra Riccò, in Liguria
- Serra San Bruno, in Calabria
- Serra San Quirico, in Marche
- Serra Sant'Abbondio, in Marche

=== Portugal ===
- Serra (Tomar), in Santarém
- Serra de Água, in the Madeira Islands
- Serra do Bouro, in Caldas da Rainha

=== San Marino ===
- La Serra, in Acquaviva

=== Spain ===
- Serra, Cape Verde
- Serra, Valencia
- Serra de Daró, in Catalonia
- Serra de Portaceli, in the Valencian Community
- La Serra d'en Galceran, in the Valencian Community

=== United States ===
- Serra, an early name of Capistrano Beach, Dana Point, California

== Other uses ==
- Serra (dance), a Pontic Greek dance
- Serra (titular see), of the Roman Catholic Church, in Tunisia
- Serra High School (disambiguation)
- Serra Hills, a mountain range in Sandaun Province, Papua New Guinea

== See also ==
- Serra Grande (disambiguation)
- Sera (disambiguation)
- Sierra (disambiguation)
- Cerro (disambiguation)
- Serro (disambiguation)
- Sara (disambiguation)
