= Butterfly doors =

Type of car door

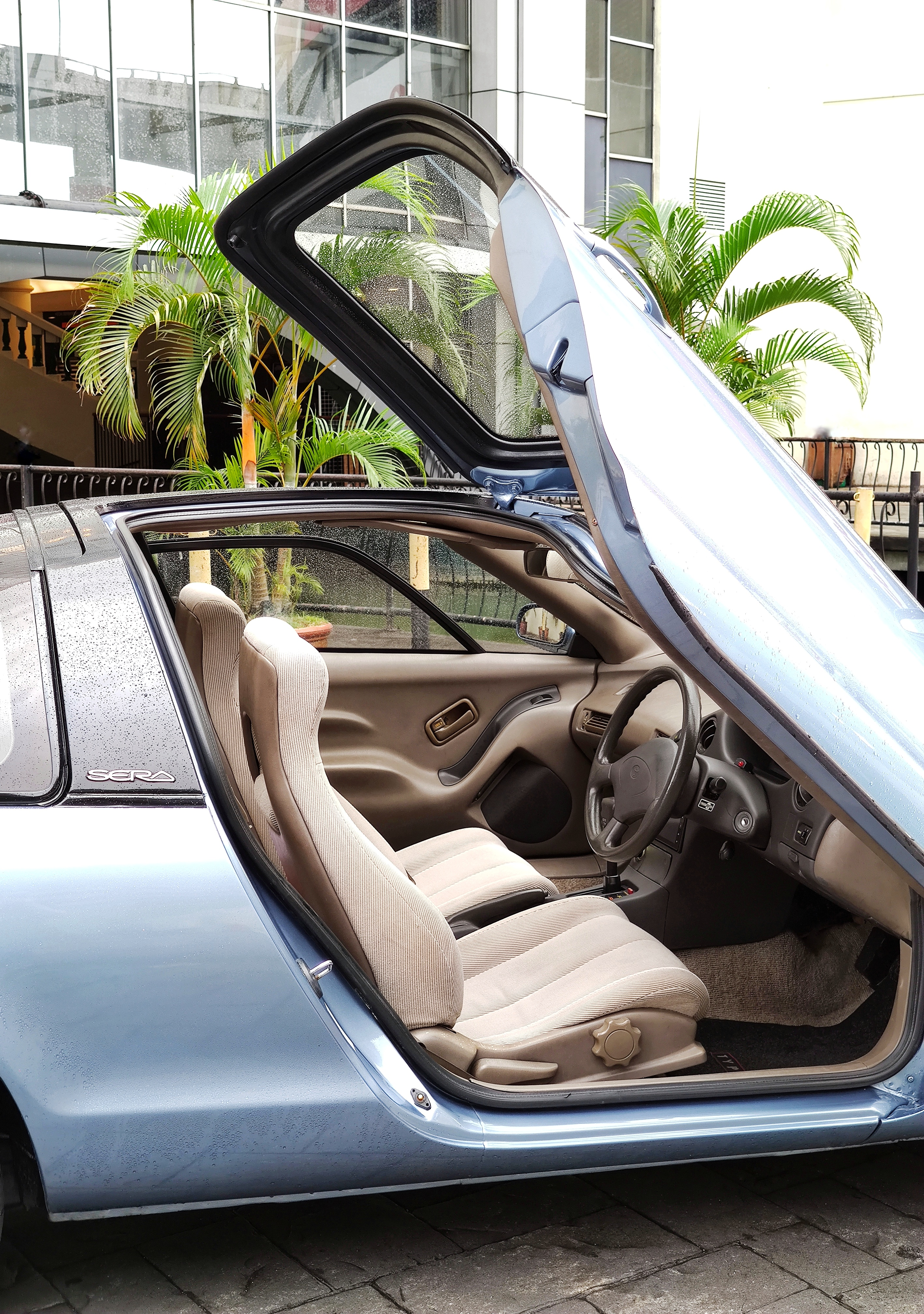
Side view of butterfly door on a Toyota Sera

Butterfly doors are a type of car door sometimes seen on high-performance cars. They are slightly different from scissor doors. While scissor doors move straight up via hinge points at the bottom of a car's A-pillar, butterfly doors move up and out via hinges along the A-pillar. This makes for easier entry and exit, at the expense of requiring more side clearance than needed for scissor doors.

== History ==
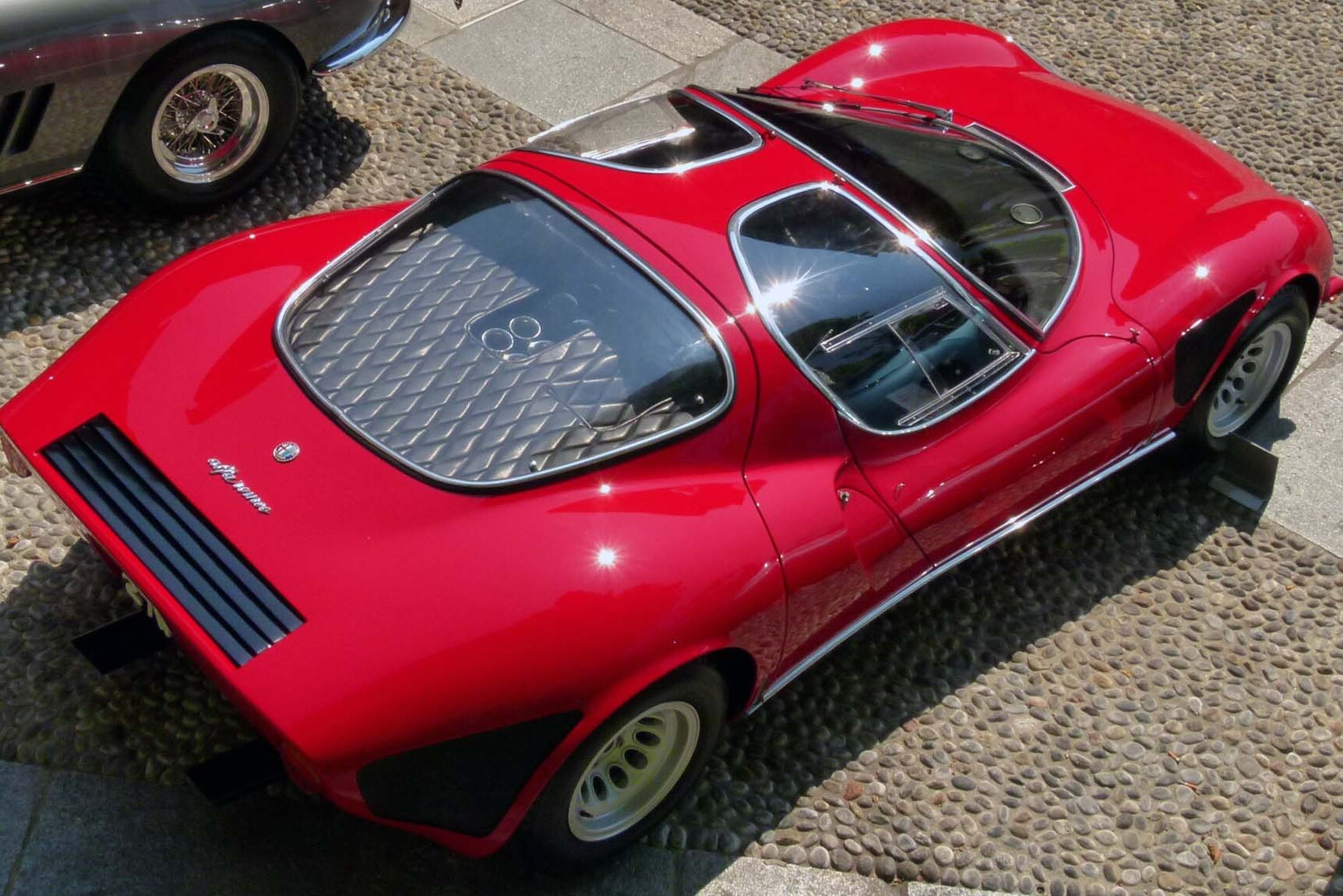
The Alfa Romeo 33 Stradale was the first production car with butterfly doors.

In 1966, the Porsche 910 Targa racecar debuted with a butterfly door design, although it was not called that at the time. Each door was hinged at both the A pillar and front fender, swinging forwards to open, and replacing the gull-wing doors found on the preceding 906. The Alfa Romeo 33 Stradale, introduced in 1967, is considered the first example of butterfly doors on a road-going production car.

These doors were commonly used in Group C and IMSA GTP prototypes, as they preserved the aerodynamic shape of the canopy while allowing the driver to enter and exit the car more quickly than conventional and gullwing doors.

The Toyota Sera, made between 1990 and 1995, was a limited-release car designed exclusively for the Japanese market and the first mass-produced vehicle with butterfly doors. The Mercedes-Benz SLR McLaren is one of the few open-top cars to use butterfly wing doors. This is made possible by having hinge points along the side of the A-pillar instead of at the top.

Butterfly doors have been used by a number of sports cars, racecars, concept cars and prototypes, such as the McLaren F1, Toyota GT-One, Saleen S7, Ferrari Enzo (and its track day version, the FXX), Bentley Speed 8, Peugeot 908 HDi FAP, McLaren Senna, Maserati MC20, and Bugatti Tourbillon.

The McLaren 12C has a unique system wherein the butterfly doors do not use a top hinge. This allows the car and its convertible version to use frameless windows.

Examples

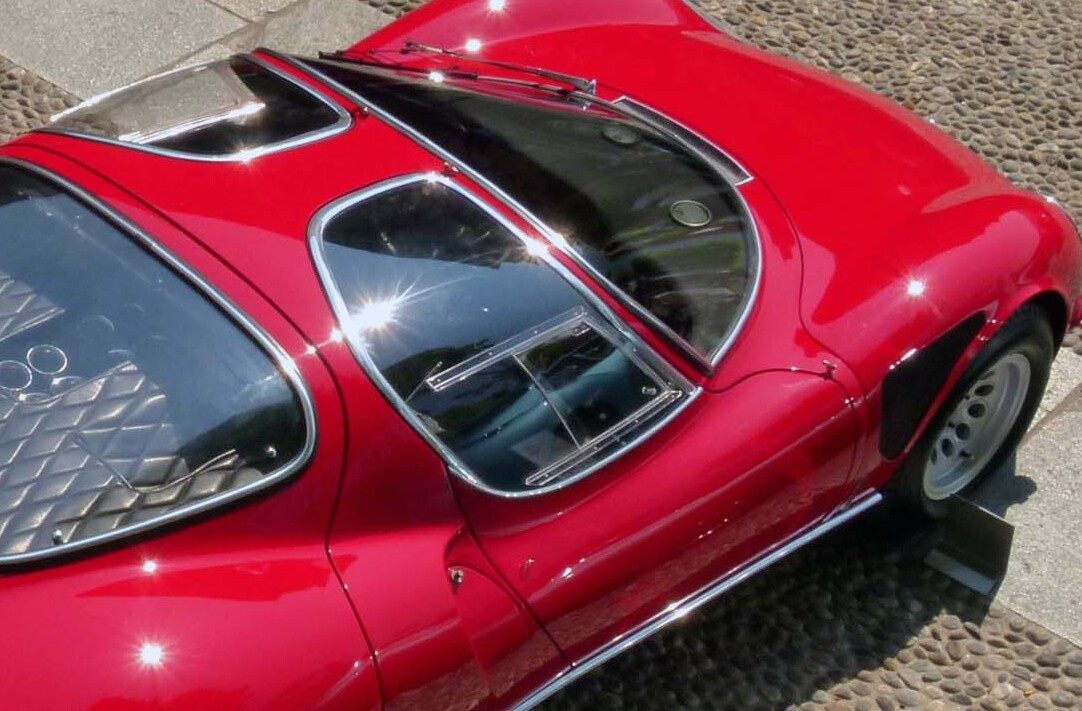
1969 Alfa Romeo 33 Stradale: close-up with integrated side / canopy door-window glass

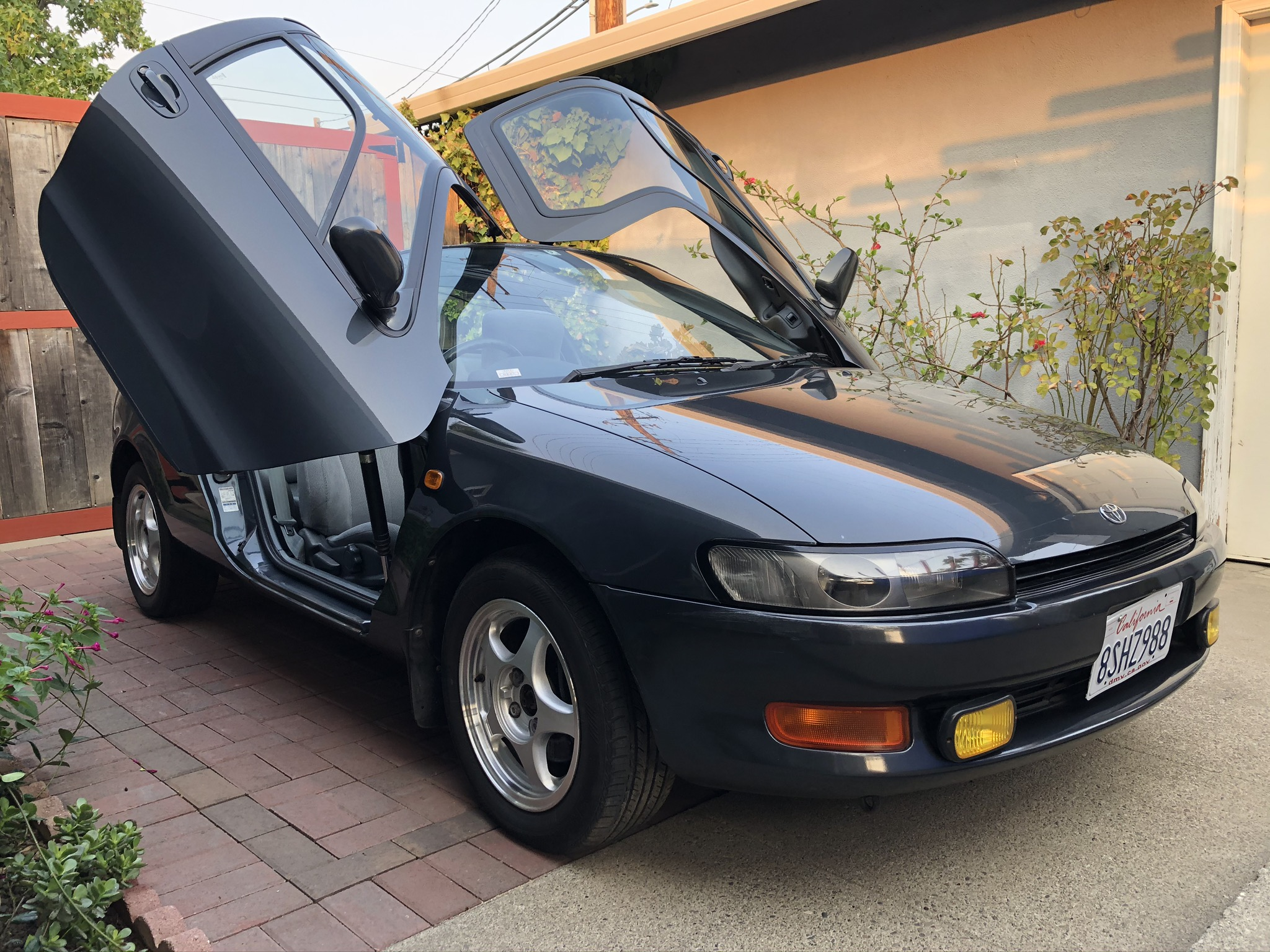
Toyota Sera

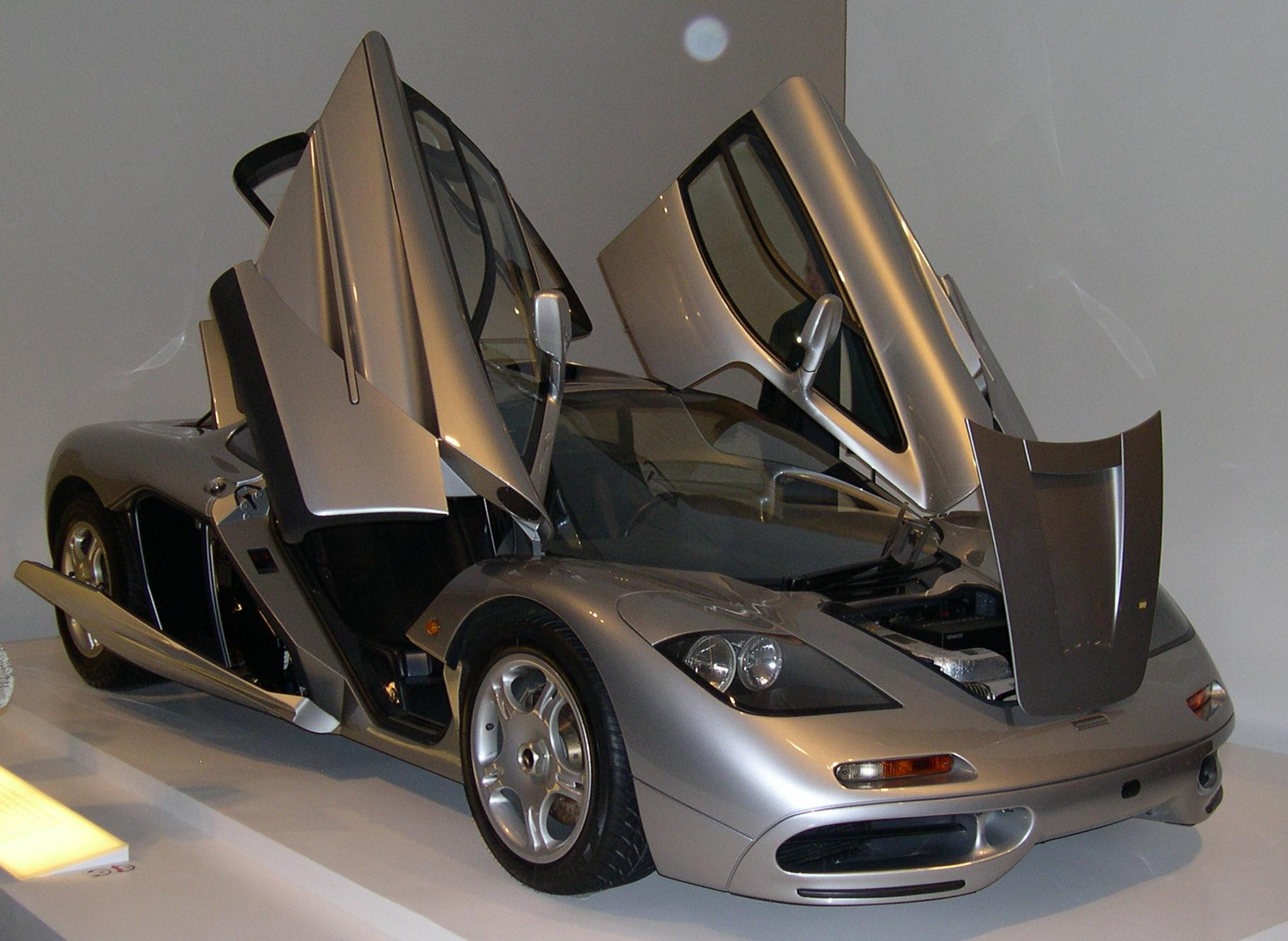
1996 McLaren F1

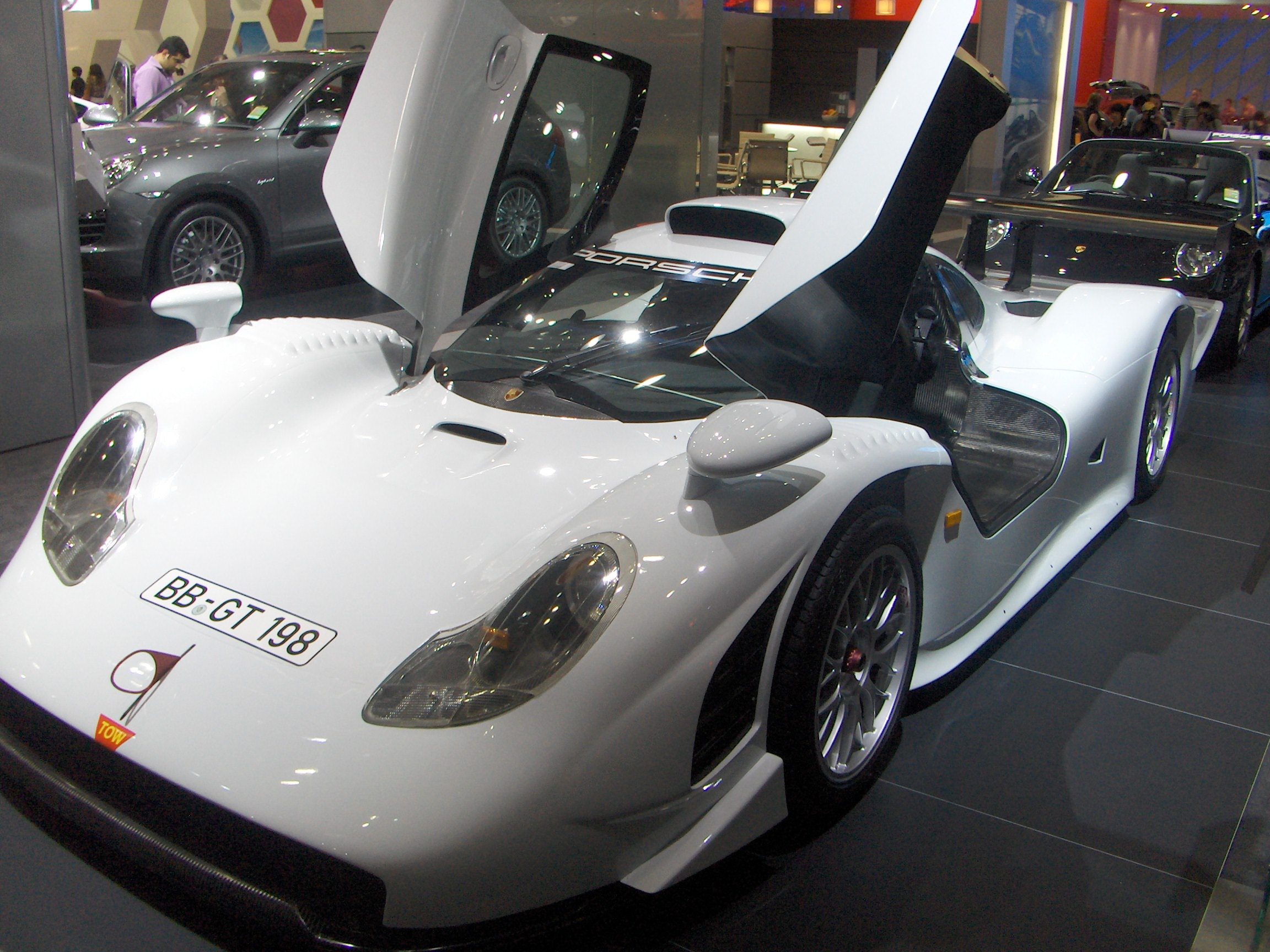
Porsche 911 GT1 Straßenversion

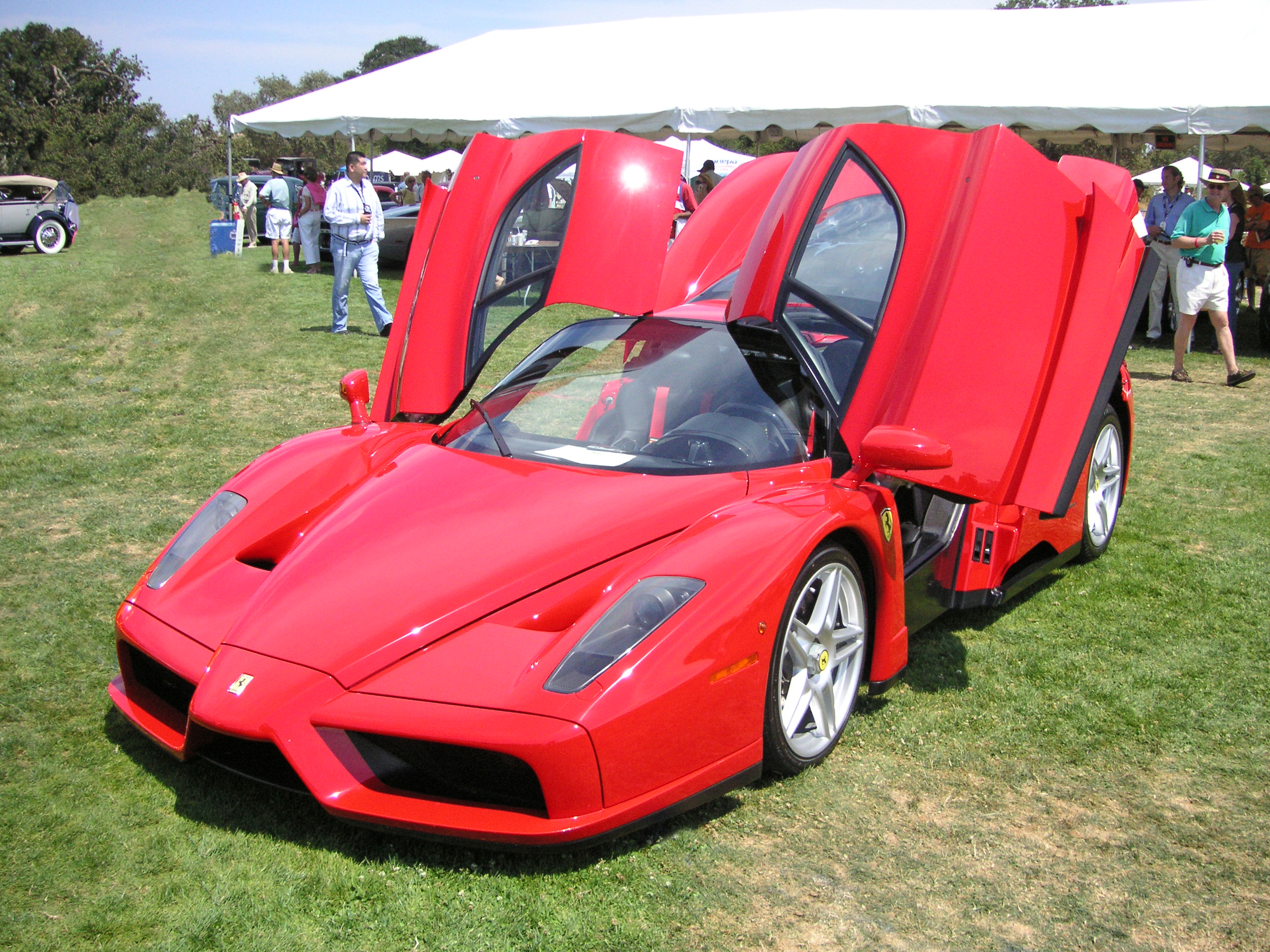
Ferrari Enzo

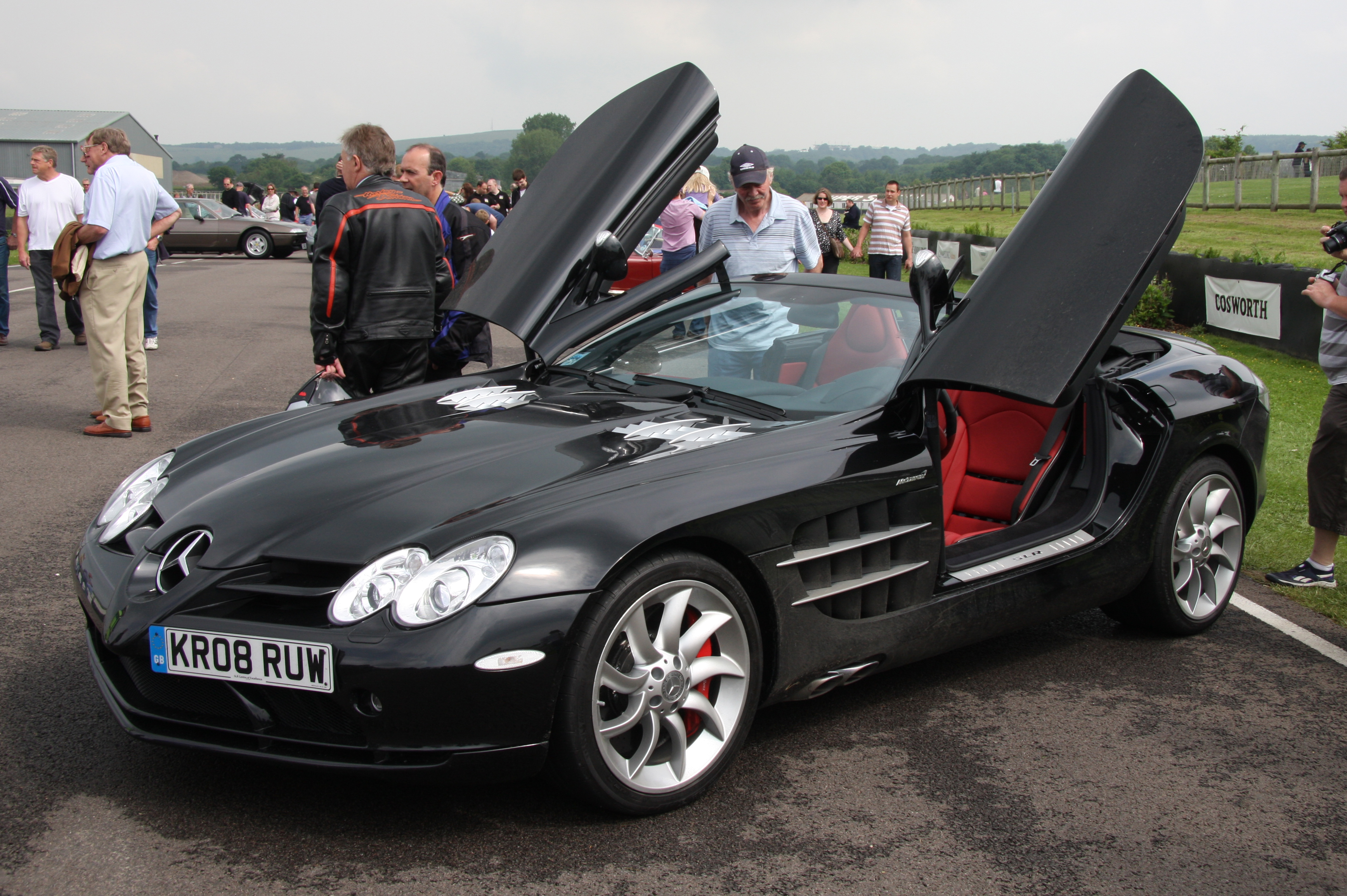
Mercedes-Benz SLR McLaren Roadster

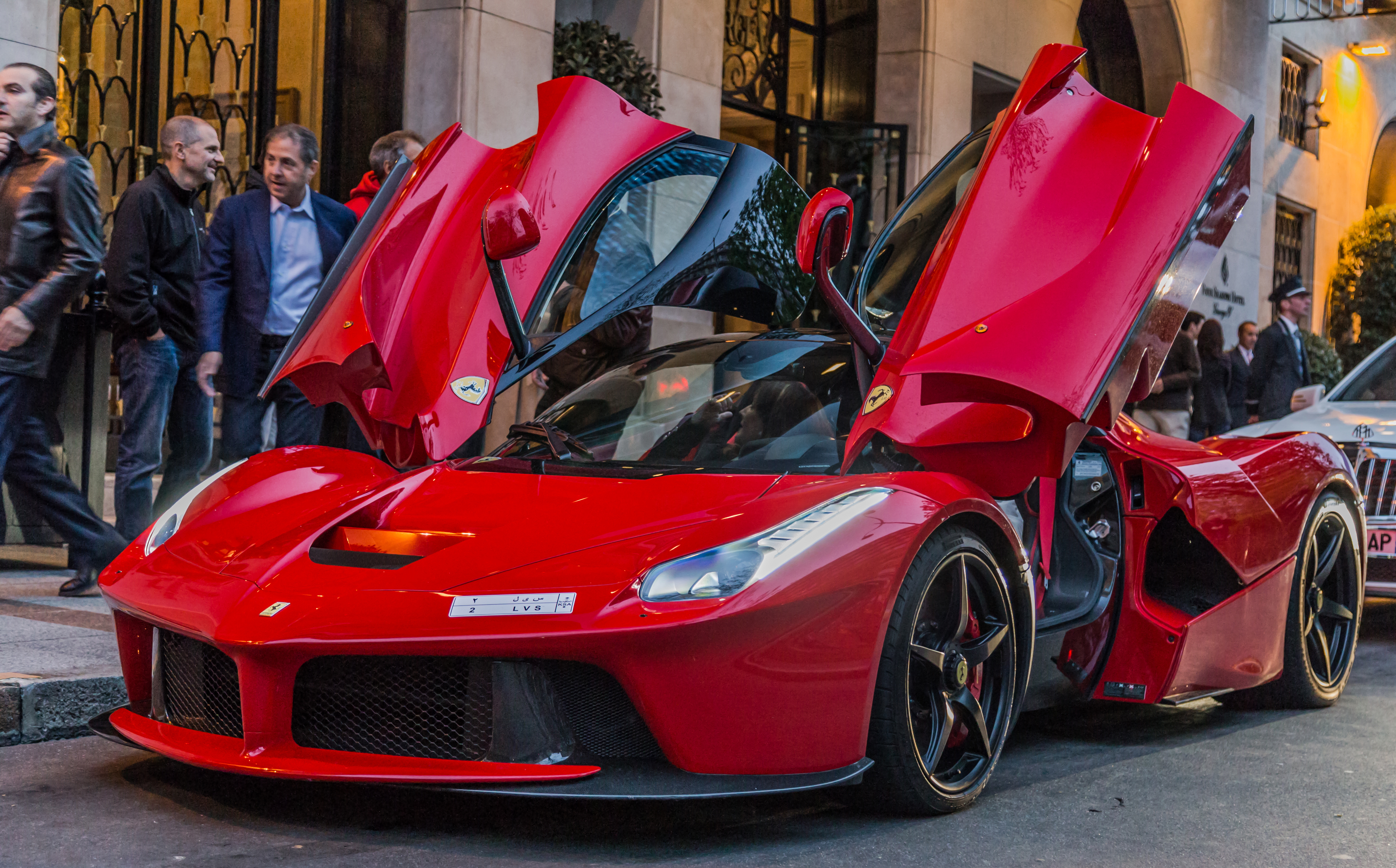
LaFerrari

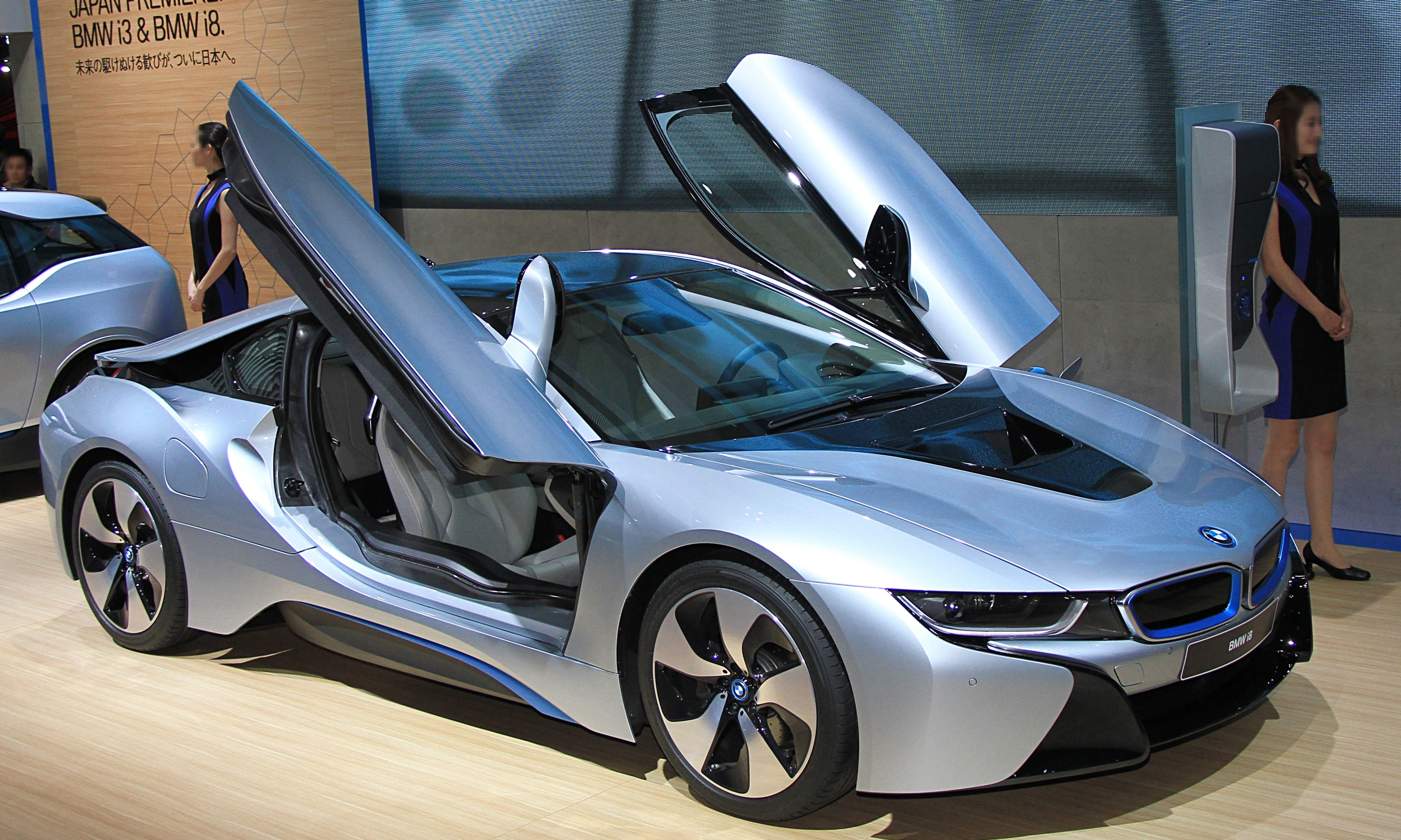
BMW i8

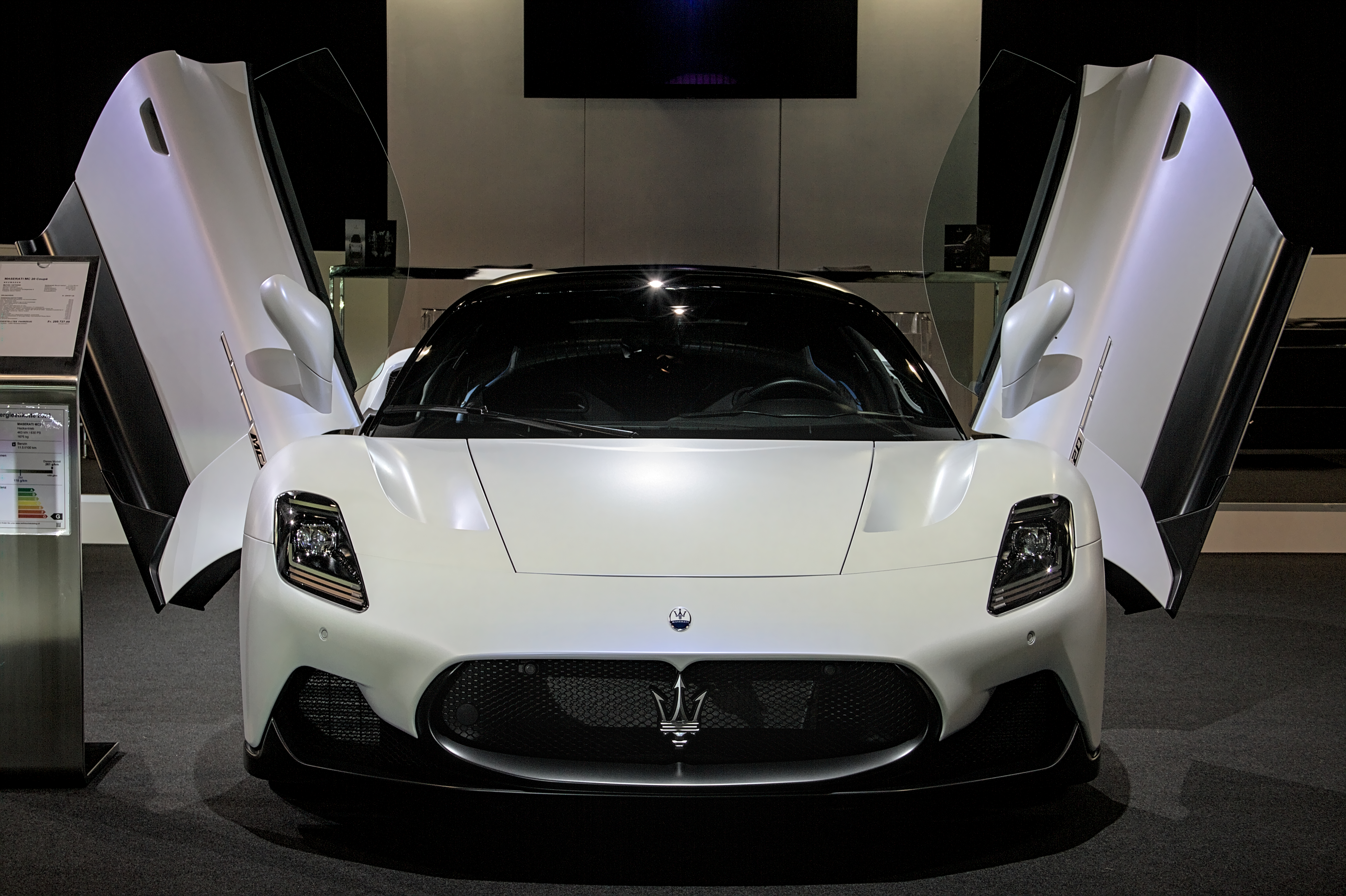
Frameless butterfly doors on a Maserati MC20

== See also ==
- Gull-wing door
- List of cars with non-standard door designs
- Scissor doors
- Sliding doors
- Suicide door
- Swan doors
- Vehicle canopy
