= Toyota Paseo =

Sports-styled subcompact car

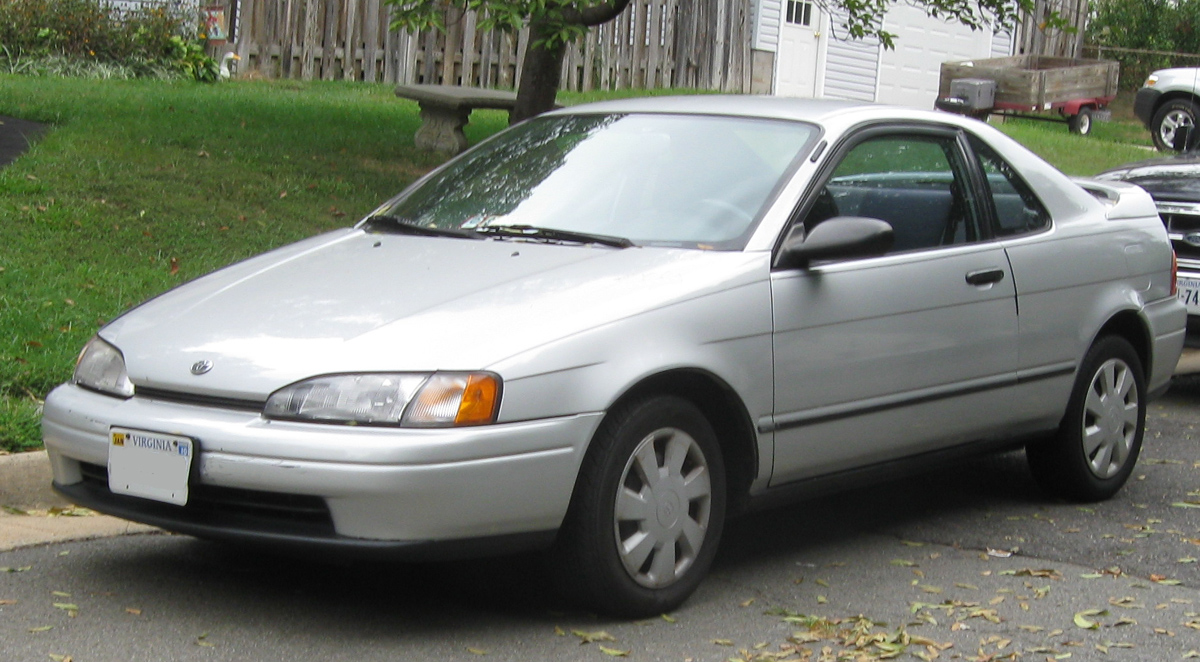
- 1992–1995 Toyota Paseo (EL44, US)

Overview
- Manufacturer: Toyota
- Also called: Toyota Cynos
- Production: January 1991 – July 1999
- Model years: 1992–1997 (US)
- Assembly: Japan: Toyota City, Aichi (Takaoka plant)

Body and chassis
- Class: Subcompact car
- Layout: Front-engine, front-wheel-drive

Chronology
- Predecessor: Toyota Tercel 2-door (L30)
- Successor: Toyota Echo coupé (XP10)

The Toyota Paseo (known as the Toyota Cynos (Japanese: トヨタ・サイノス, Toyota Sainosu) in Japan and other regions) is a sports-styled subcompact car sold from 1991 until 1999 by Toyota and was directly based on the Tercel. It was available as a coupé and in later models as a convertible. Toyota stopped selling the car in the United States in 1997, however the car continued to be sold in Canada, Europe and Japan until 1999. The Paseo, like the Tercel, shares a platform with the Starlet. Several parts are interchangeable between the three.

The name "Paseo" is Spanish for "a walk" or "a stroll", while the name "Cynos" is a coined word taken from "cynosure", meaning "the target of attention". In Japan it was exclusive to Toyopet Store locations.

== First generation (L40; 1991) ==
First generation (L40)
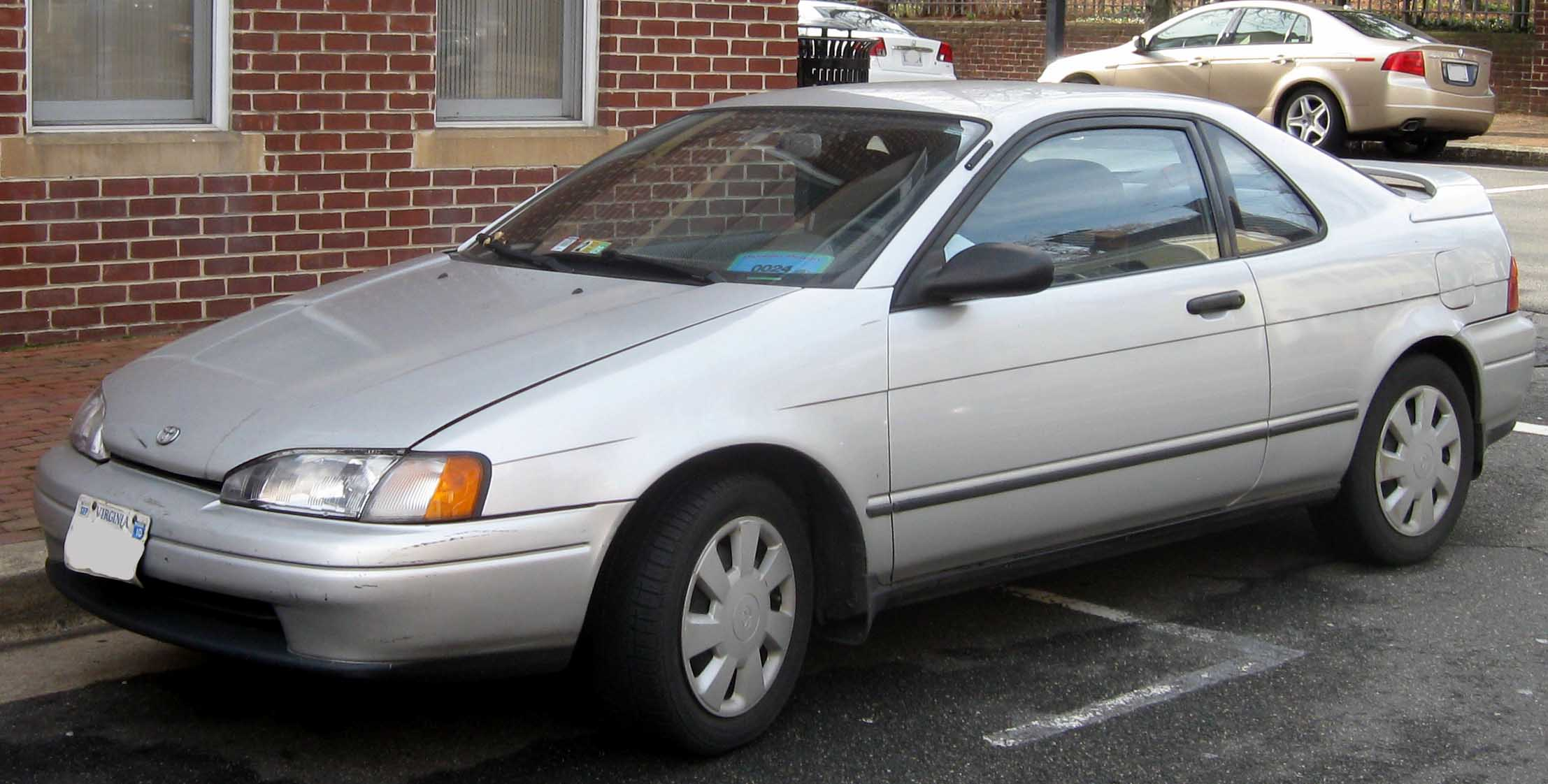
- 1992–1995 Toyota Paseo (EL44, US)

Overview
- Also called: Toyota Cynos
- Production: January 1991 – August 1995
- Model years: 1992–1995 (US)

Body and chassis
- Body style: 2-door coupé
- Related: Toyota Tercel (L40); Toyota Starlet (P80); Toyota Sera (EXY10)

Powertrain
- Engine: 1.5 L 5E-FE I4 (gasoline); 1.5 L 5E-FHE I4 (gasoline, Japan only)
- Power output: 69–77 kW (94–105 PS; 93–103 hp) (5E-FE); 85 kW (115 PS; 113 hp) (5E-FHE)
- Transmission: 5-speed manual; 4-speed automatic

Dimensions
- Wheelbase: 2,380 mm (93.7 in)
- Length: 4,145 mm (163.2 in)
- Width: 1,645 mm (64.8 in)
- Height: 1,295 mm (51.0 in)
- Curb weight: 870–950 kg (1,918–2,094 lb)

The first-generation Paseo was made from 1991 until 1995. Based on the L40 series Tercel, it is powered by a 1.5-liter 5E-FE inline-four engine. In most markets, the Paseo's engine was rated at 74.5 kW (100 hp; 101 PS) at 6,400 rpm and 123 N⋅m (91 lb⋅ft) of torque at 3,200 rpm. In 1993, in California and other states with California level emissions standards, it was rated at 69 kW (93 hp; 94 PS) and 136 N⋅m (100 lb⋅ft) of torque. It was offered with either a 5-speed manual or a 4-speed automatic transmission.

In Japan, the Cynos was available in α (Alpha) and β (Beta) trim levels. The α trim is powered by a 5E-FE engine producing 77 kW (105 PS; 104 hp), while the β trim is powered by a 5E-FHE engine producing 85 kW (115 PS; 113 hp). In β trim, four-wheel disc brakes and TEMS electronically controlled suspension can be selected as options.

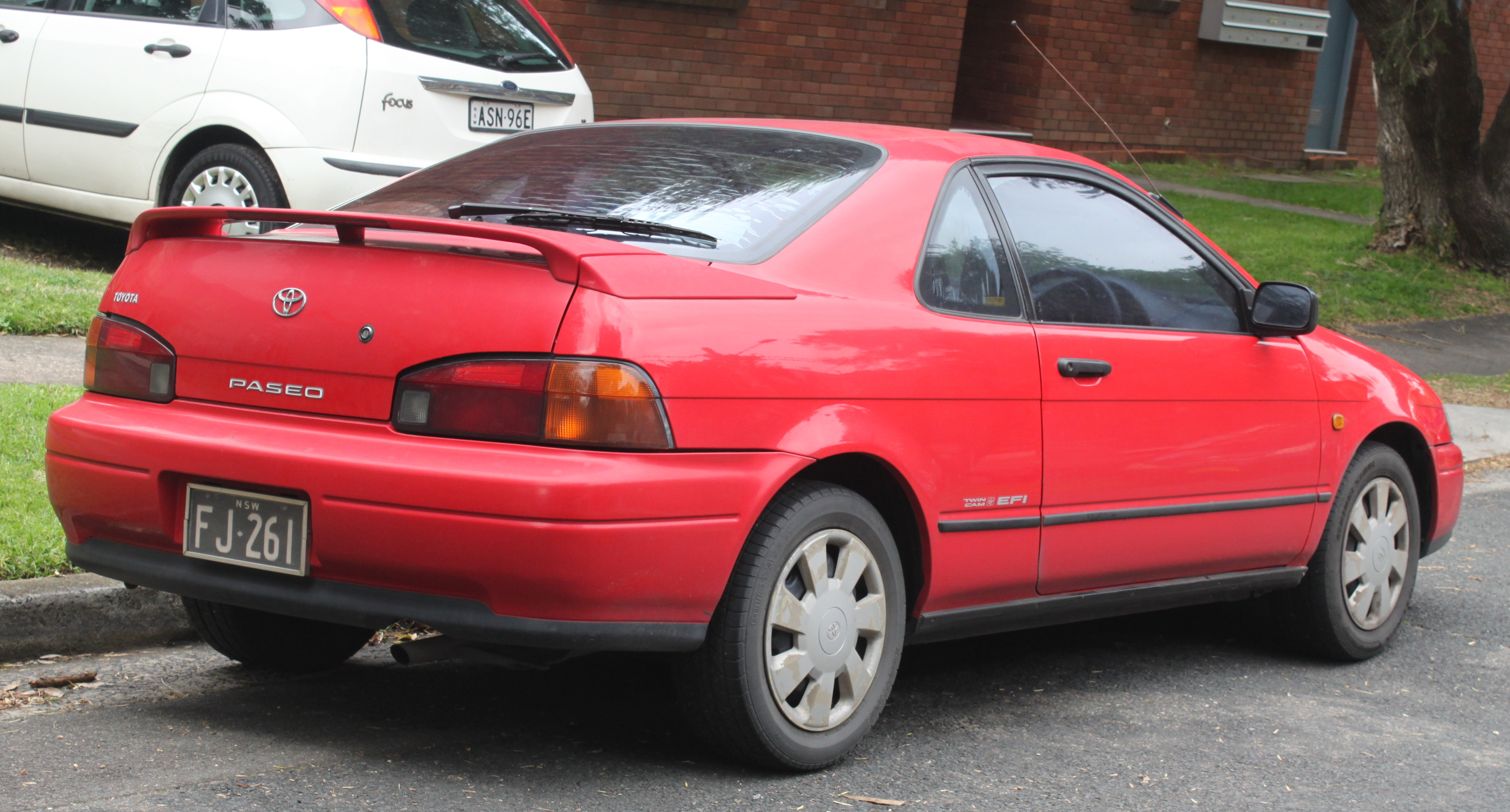
1992 Toyota Paseo (EL44, Australia)

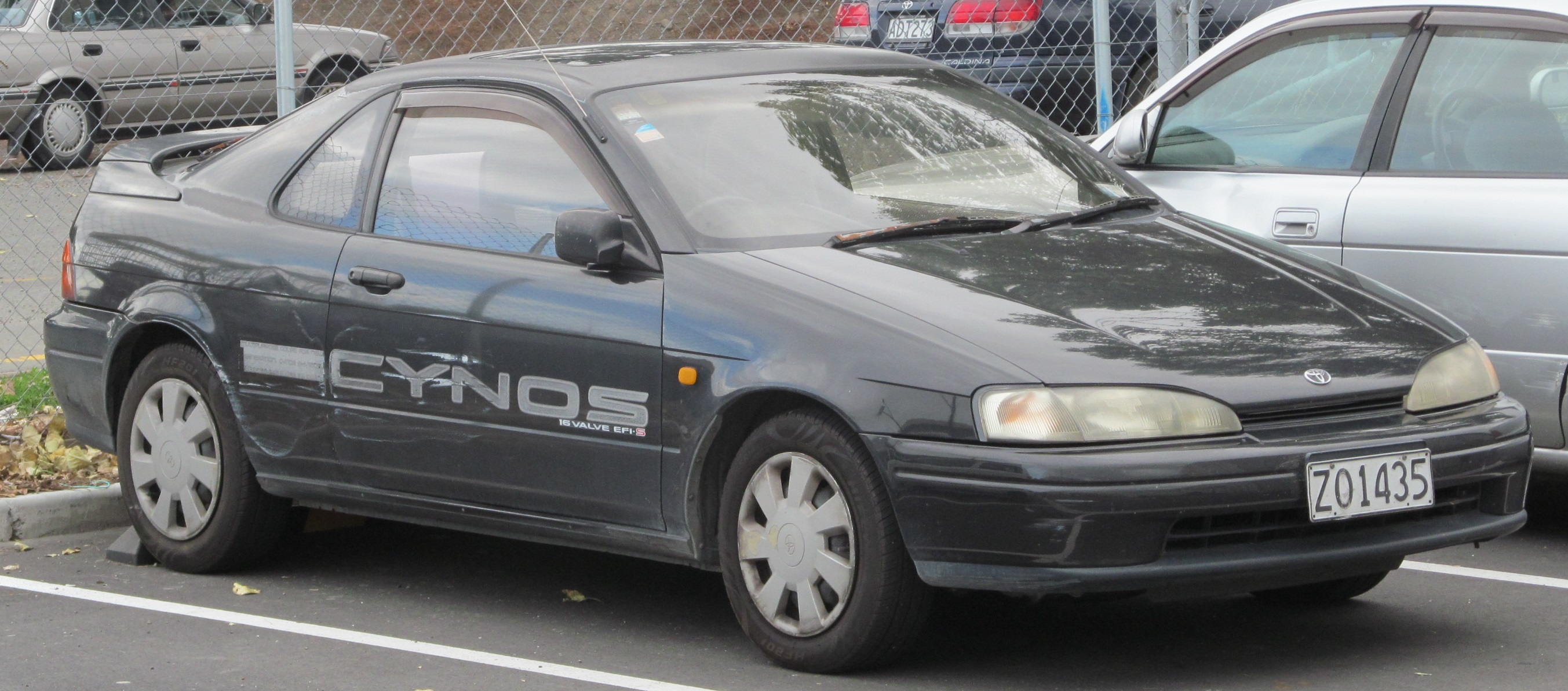
1992 Toyota Cynos (EL44, Japan)

== Second generation (L50; 1995) ==
Second generation (L50)
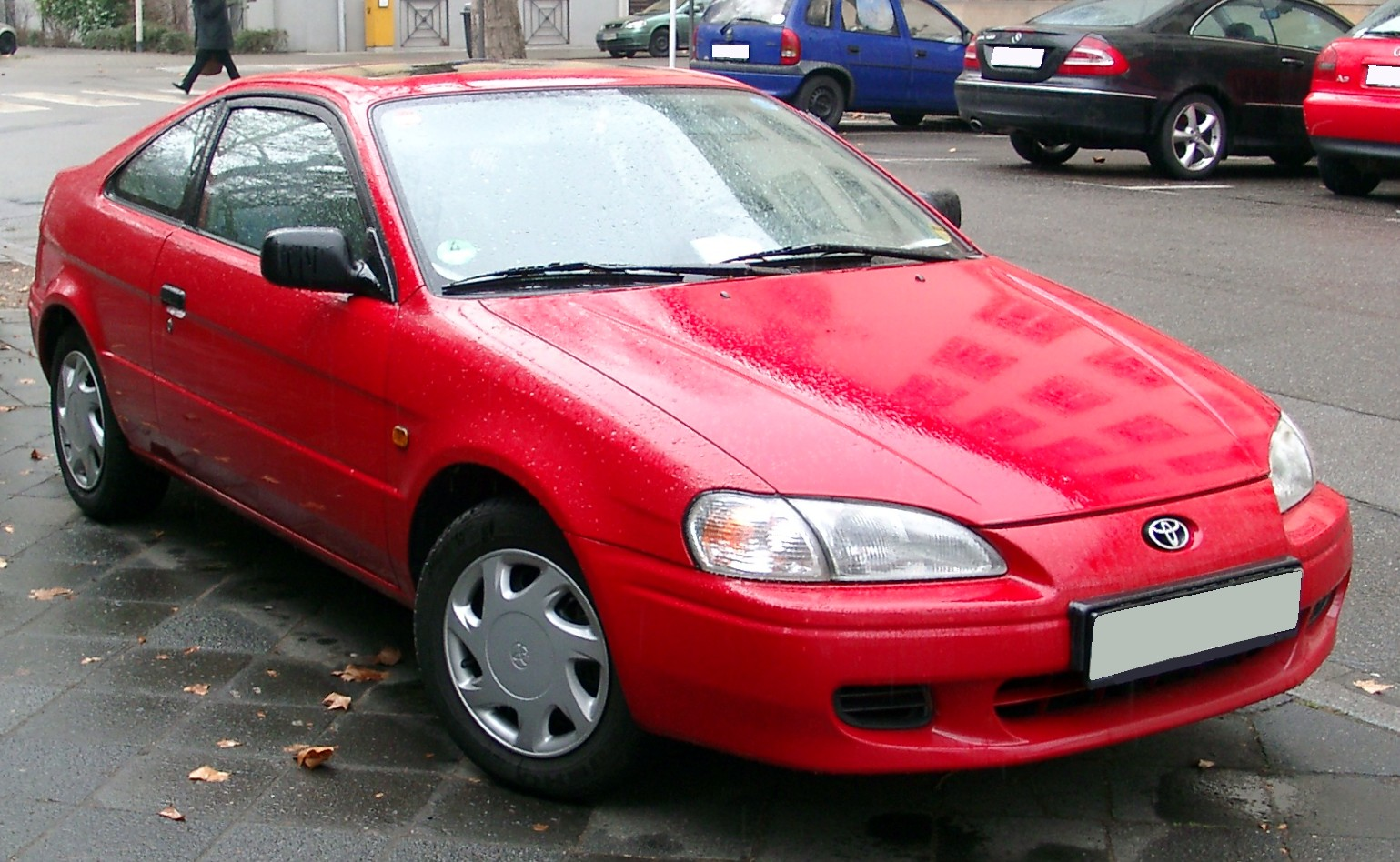
- Toyota Paseo (EL54)

Overview
- Also called: Toyota Cynos
- Production: September 1995 – July 1999
- Model years: 1996–1997 (US)

Body and chassis
- Body style: 2-door coupé; 2-door convertible
- Related: Toyota Tercel (L50); Toyota Starlet (P90)

Powertrain
- Engine: 1.3 L 4E-FE I4 (gasoline, Japan only); 1.5 L 5E-FE I4 (gasoline); 1.5 L 5E-FHE I4 (gasoline, Japan only)
- Power output: 63–65 kW (85–88 PS; 84–87 hp) (4E-FE); 66–69 kW (90–94 PS; 89–93 hp) (5E-FE); 81 kW (110 PS; 108 hp) (5E-FHE)
- Transmission: 4/5-speed manual; 3/4-speed automatic

Dimensions
- Wheelbase: 2,380 mm (93.7 in)
- Length: 4,155 mm (163.6 in)
- Width: 1,660 mm (65.4 in)
- Height: 1,295 mm (51.0 in)
- Curb weight: 910–1,000 kg (2,006–2,205 lb)

The second-generation Paseo was introduced in Japan in 1995, and for the 1996 model year in North America. Apart from some modernizing in the engine electronics, the only noticeable change was in the body sheet metal. A convertible model was built by ASC and shown at the October 1995 Tokyo Motor Show and was released for sale in August 1996.

To reduce emissions levels, the second-generation Paseo's 5E-FE engine performance was reduced to the same specifications as the California Air Resources Board models, delivering 69 kW (93 hp; 94 PS) and 136 N⋅m (100 lb⋅ft) of torque. The Paseo was discontinued in the US in late 1996 early in the 1997 model year due to slow sales.

The second-generation Paseo was sold in the United Kingdom from 1996 to 1998, but was withdrawn due to slow sales. The UK market Paseo was offered in three trim levels: the base ST, the Si; adding 14-inch alloy wheels, a Sony CD player, color-coded boot spoiler with third brake light and an anti-lock braking system, and the Galliano, adding a color-coded chin spoiler, mud guards and yellow paintwork with aquamarine decals on the bodysides, as well as wider 15-inch alloy wheels with low-profile 195/50 tires. The convertible model was not offered. All UK models came with the 5E-FE engine producing 66 kW (89 hp; 90 PS). The top speed, as claimed by Toyota, was 180 km/h (112 mph).

The Japanese market version was again named "Cynos". Three trim levels were available: α, α Juno Package and β. All came with color-coded wing mirrors and a rear windscreen wiper. The models differed in their dashboards, interior upholstery, steering wheels and engines. Both α models came with a 88 PS (65 kW), 1.3 L 4E-FE engine with a 4-speed manual transmission or a 3-speed automatic transmission. The β trim came with a 5E-FHE engine, producing 110 PS (81 kW), fitted either to a 5-speed manual transmission or a 4-speed automatic. In September 1996, the smaller engine was revised to improve drivability and low-end power; power decreased marginally to 85 PS (63 kW). From October 1996, the ASC-built convertible version was also offered in Japan, with both the 1.3- and 1.5-liter engines (the 1.5 only in conjunction with the automatic transmission). Along with a very minor facelift in December 1997, the 1.3's manual transmission was upgraded to a five-speed unit.

Production of both the Paseo and Cynos were discontinued in July 1999 (sales in Japan continued until December).

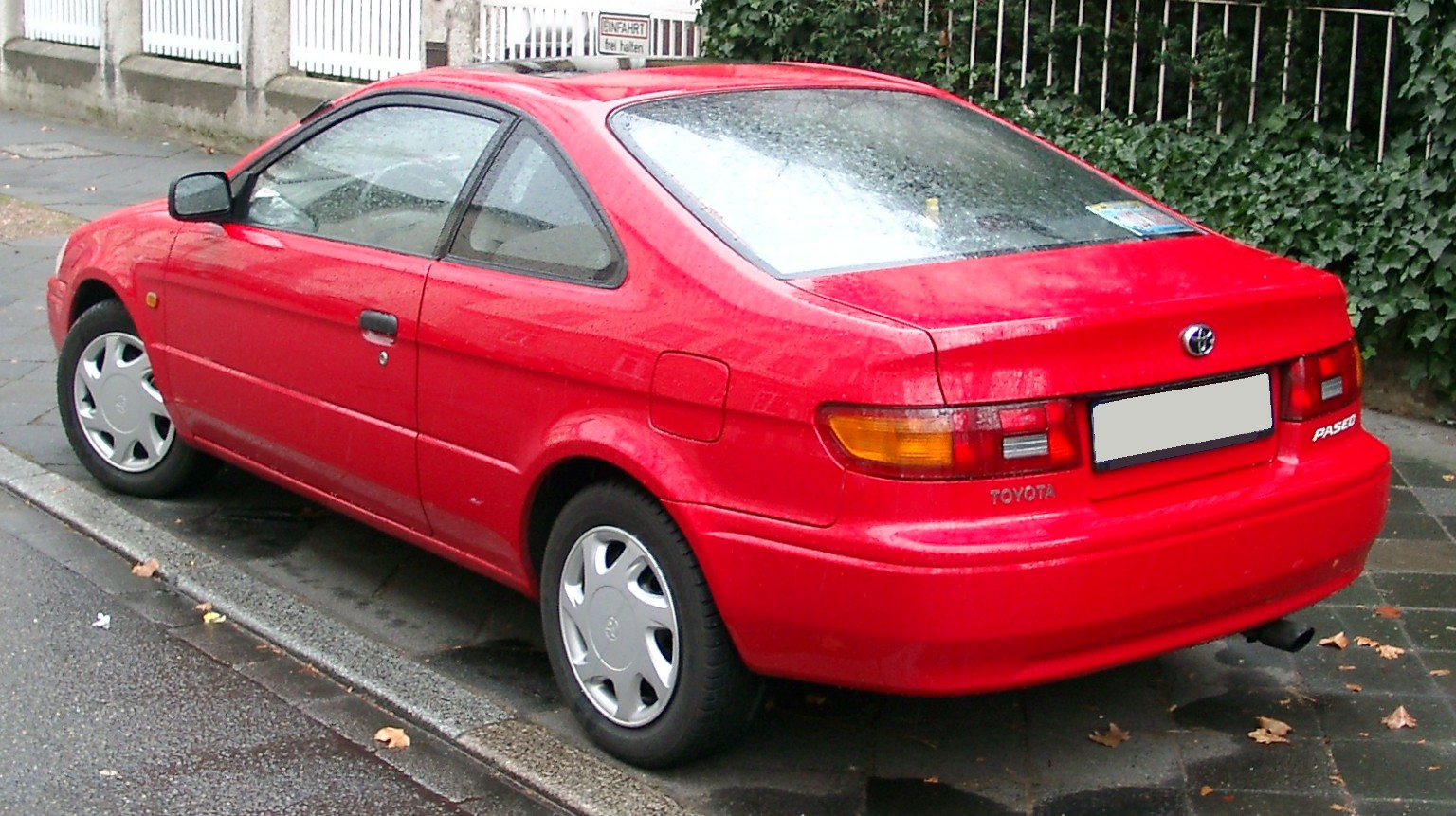
Rear view

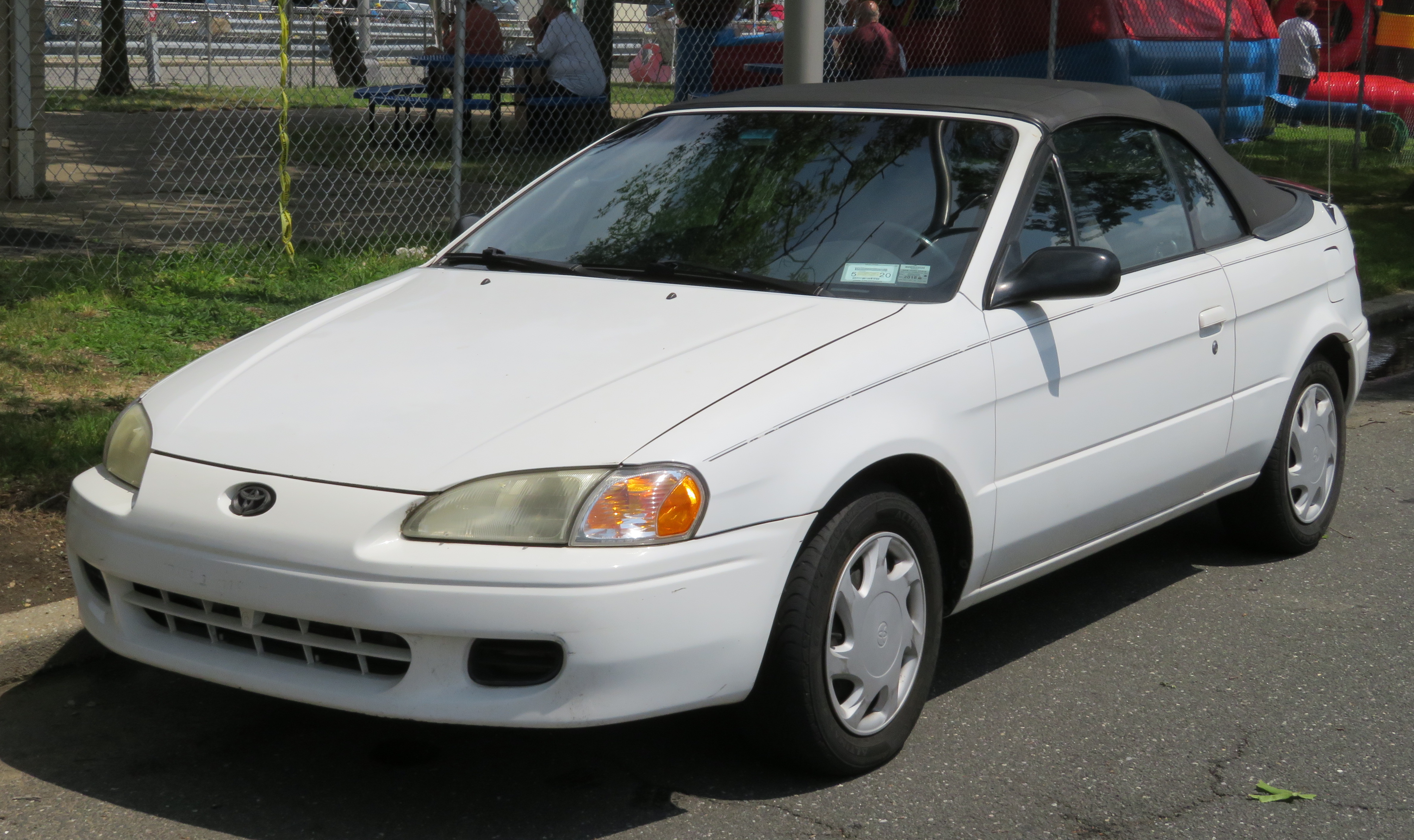
1997 Toyota Paseo convertible (EL54, US)

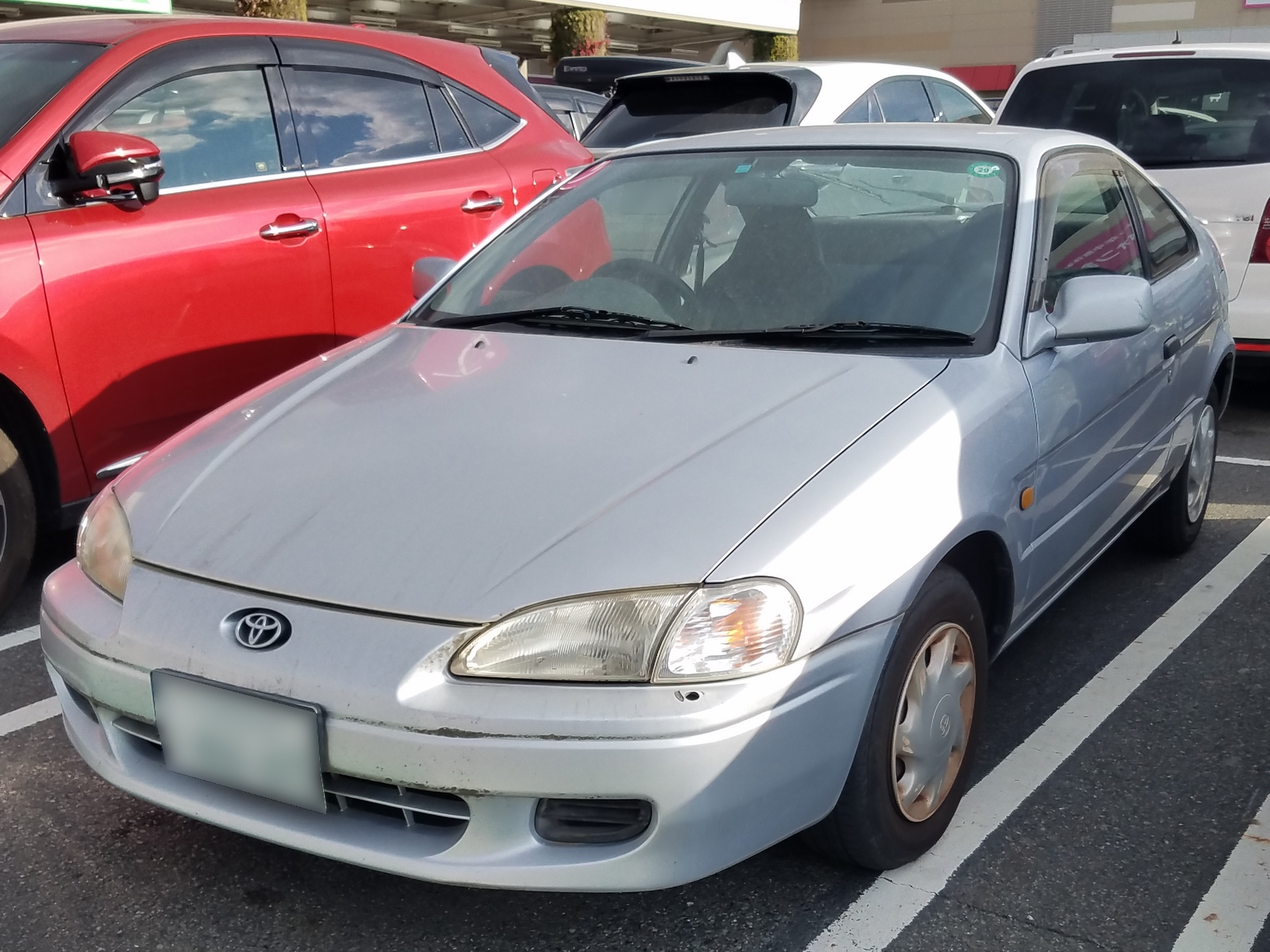
Toyota Cynos 1.3 α Juno Package (EL52, Japan)
