= Toyota E engine =

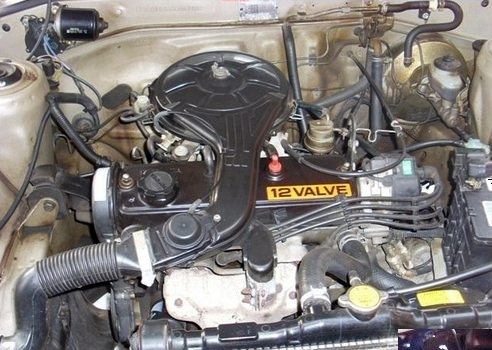
- 2E engine

Overview
- Manufacturer: Toyota
- Production: 1985–1999

Layout
- Configuration: Straight-four
- Cylinder block material: Cast iron
- Cylinder head material: Aluminium
- Valvetrain: SOHC 3 valves x cyl. DOHC 4 valves x cyl.

Combustion
- Turbocharger: In some versions
- Fuel system: Carbureted, Fuel injected
- Fuel type: Gasoline
- Cooling system: Water-cooled

Output
- Power output: 55–133 hp (41–99 kW)
- Torque output: 72–127 lb⋅ft (98–172 N⋅m)

Chronology
- Predecessor: Toyota K engine (up to 1.3 L models)
- Successor: Toyota SZ engine (for 1.0 L and 1.3 L models); Toyota NZ engine (for 1.3 L and 1.5 L models)

The Toyota E engine series are a family of straight-four multi-valve piston engines produced by Toyota Motor Corporation from 1985 to 1999. Like many other Toyota engines of the era, the E engine series features a cast iron block along with an aluminium cylinder head, and uses timing belts rather than chains. The members of the E engine family range from 1.0 L to 1.5 L. The E family supplanted the K engines in most applications. A large number of parts in the E engine series are interchangeable between each other.

The E engine series was one of the first engines made by Toyota that were designed with fuel economy, practicality and everyday use in mind (rather than performance). They are designed to provide power and torque in the low-to-mid RPM range, as well as improving fuel efficiency. These engines are lightweight compared to earlier Toyota engines due to its hollow crankshaft, thinned casting of the cylinder block, and several other reductions in auxiliaries as well as in the engine itself. Carbureted versions include a newly-designed, variable-venturi carburetor. All of these changes improved fuel economy and emissions.

The SOHC variants of the E engine series use three valves per cylinder for a total of 12 valves, which contrasts with other straight-four SOHC engines which typically have two valves per cylinder for a total of eight valves. DOHC variants of the E engine series have four valves per cylinder for a total of 16 valves, and used narrow-valve angles instead of the wide-valve angles used in some performance-oriented DOHC engines. The DOHC engines also used Toyota's High-Mecha Twin Cam system (also known as the "slave-cam system") which involves a single timing belt driving the two scissor geared camshafts together, with the timing belt driving the exhaust camshaft and the exhaust camshaft driving the inlet camshaft via scissor gears. This is in stark contrast to other Toyota engines, which sometimes have both camshafts being driven by the timing belts or chains.

== 1E ==
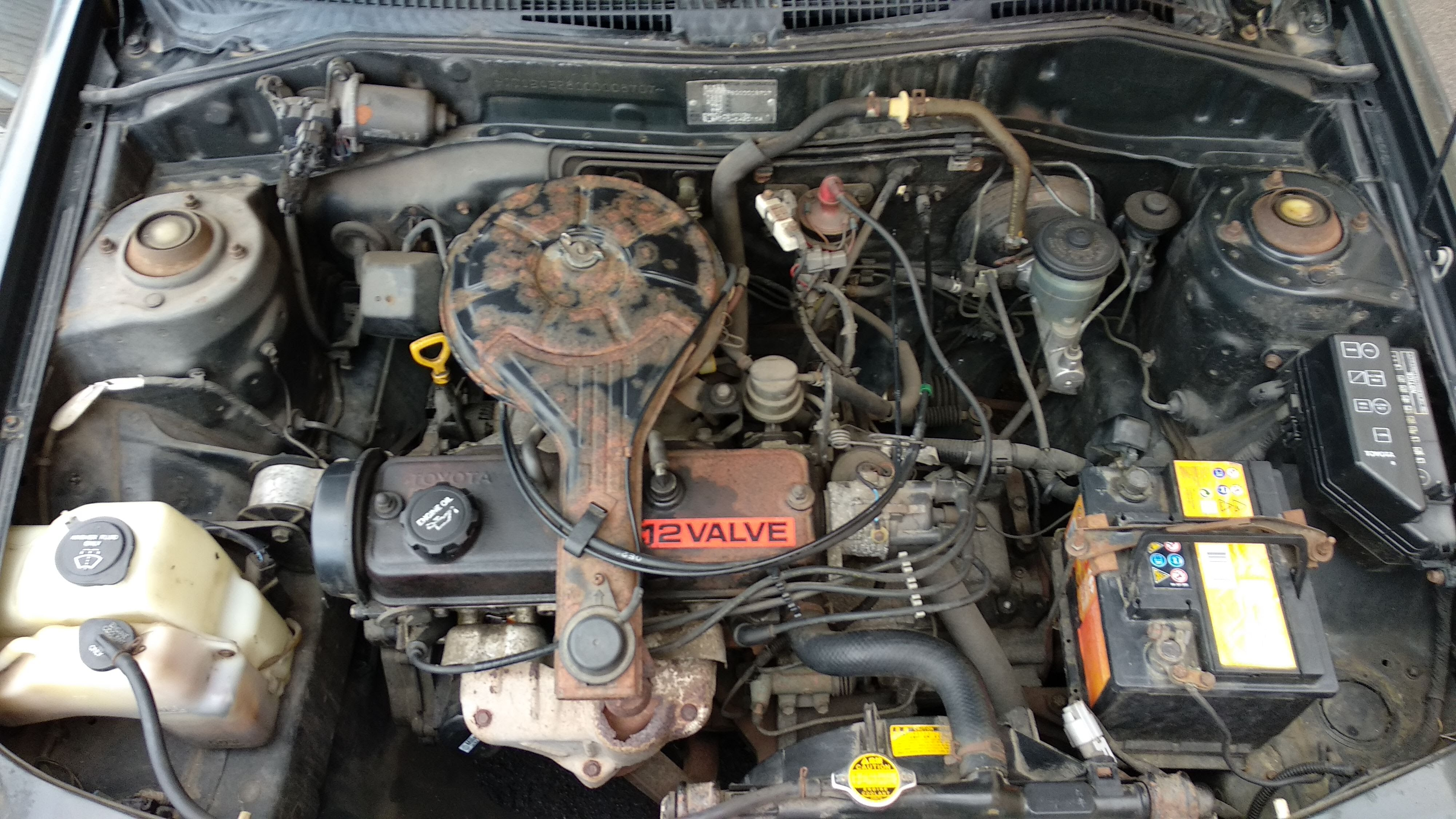
Toyota 1E engine

The 1E is a 1.0 L (999 cc) SOHC version with three valves per cylinder. Output ranges to about 55 hp (41 kW) at 6,000 rpm, while torque is 102 N⋅m (75 lb⋅ft) at 3,500 rpm. It appeared in 1985, and was discontinued after 1994. Bore and stroke is 70.5 mm × 64 mm (2.78 in × 2.52 in). Compression ratio is 9.0:1. The 1E engines came in both carbureted and fuel-injected versions, which includes the 1E-FE, a fuel-injected DOHC version of the 1E with four valves per cylinder.

Specs

- Bore x stroke: 70.5 mm × 64 mm (2.78 in × 2.52 in)
- Displacement: 1.0 L (999 cc)
- Valve clearance: Intake: 0.2 mm (0.01 in); Exhaust: 0.2 mm (0.01 in)
- Ignition timing (with vacuum advancer off): 10 degrees BTDC
- Oil capacity: 3.2 L (3.4 US qt)

Gearbox

- 4-speed manual gearbox: C140
- Automatic transmission: A131

Applications

- Toyota Starlet EP70, EP80

== 2E ==
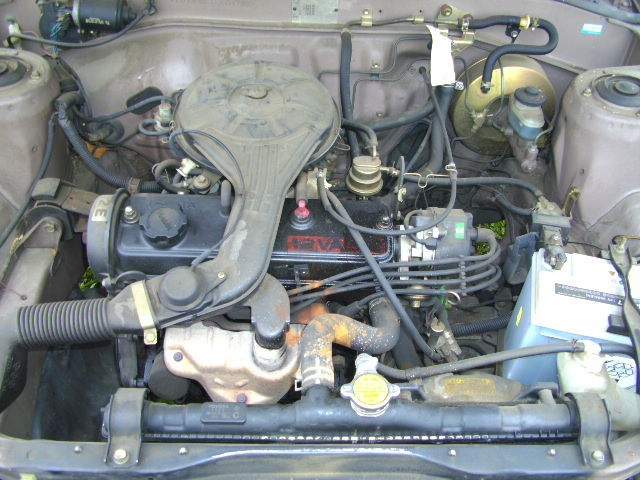
Toyota 2E engine

The 2E is a 1.3 L (1,295 cc) SOHC version with three valves per cylinder. Output ranges from 65 to 88 hp (48 to 66 kW; 66 to 89 PS) at 6,000 rpm with 72 lb⋅ft (98 N⋅m) of torque at 3600 rpm to 77 lb⋅ft (104 N⋅m) of torque at 5200 rpm. It appeared in 1985, and was discontinued after 1998. The 2E engines appeared in both carbureted and fuel-injected (called 2E-E) versions. The 2E-TE, appearing in 1986, is a turbocharged engine producing 100 PS (74 kW; 99 hp). A later version, the 2E-TELU produces 110 PS (81 kW; 108 hp).

Specs

- Bore x stroke: 73 mm × 77.4 mm (2.87 in × 3.05 in)
- Displacement: 1.3 L (1,295 cc)
- Compression ratio: 9.5:1
- Ignition timing (with vacuum advancer off): 10 degrees BTDC
- Ignition timing (as per Haynes Databook): 5 degrees BTDC at 800 rpm

Gearbox

- 4-speed and 5-speed manual gearbox: C40, C150, C152 (turbo model)
- Automatic transmission: A132

Applications

- Toyota Corolla/Toyota Sprinter EE80, EE90, EE96V, EE97G, EE100, EE110
- Toyota Starlet EP71, EP81, EP90
- Toyota Starlet EP76V Van (2E-LJ) - 73 PS (54 kW; 72 hp) at 6,000 rpm, 10.3 kg⋅m (101 N⋅m; 75 lb⋅ft) at 4,000 rpm
- Toyota Corsa
- Toyota Conquest (South Africa)
- Toyota Tazz (South Africa)
- Toyota Tercel (Caribbean/South America/Middle East)

== 3E ==
The 3E is a 1.5 L (1,456 cc) SOHC version with three valves per cylinder. Output ranges from 79 to 88 PS (58 to 65 kW; 78 to 87 hp) at 6,000 rpm with 87 lb⋅ft (118 N⋅m) of torque at 4,000 rpm to 89 lb⋅ft (121 N⋅m) of torque at 4,800 rpm. It appeared in 1986, and was discontinued after 1994. The 3E engines appeared in both carbureted (3E) and fuel-injected (3E-E) applications. The 3E-TE, appearing in 1986, is a turbocharged engine producing 115 PS (85 kW; 113 hp) at 5,600 rpm with 17.5 kg⋅m (172 N⋅m; 127 lb⋅ft) of torque at 3,200 rpm.

These engines are considered to be slightly less reliable than other Toyota engines, despite being one of the easiest engines to service. The most common problems of these engines are premature valve stem seal (nitrile rubber) failure, carbon buildup on the intake valves, and collapse of the oil control ring on the piston. This can lead to symptoms such as rough idling, stalling, and fouled spark plugs, and therefore needs to be differentially diagnosed. Fortunately, the valve stem seals, at least, can be replaced with silicone or Viton-based seals, which lasts much longer.

Specs

- Bore x stroke 73 mm × 87 mm (2.87 in × 3.43 in)
- 9.3:1 compression ratio (8.0:1 3E-TE)

Applications

- Toyota Corolla/Sprinter EE98V (van)
- Toyota Corolla/Sprinter EE107V/EE108G (van/wagon)
- Toyota Corona ET176V (van)
- Toyota Tercel/Corolla II/Corsa EL31

== 4E ==
The 4E is a 1.3 L (1,331 cc) DOHC version with four valves per cylinder. Bore and stroke is 74 mm × 77.4 mm (2.91 in × 3.05 in). Output ranges from 74 hp (55 kW; 75 PS) at 6,400 rpm to 99 hp (74 kW; 100 PS) at 6,600 rpm with 81 lb⋅ft (110 N⋅m) of torque at 3,600 rpm to 86 lb⋅ft (117 N⋅m) of torque at 4,000 rpm. It appeared in 1989, and was discontinued after 1998. The 4E engines appeared in both carbureted (4E-F) and fuel-injected (4E-FE) applications.

Applications

- Toyota Starlet EP82, EP85, EP91, EP95
- Toyota Tercel
- Toyota Corolla
- Toyota Paseo
- Toyota Cynos

=== First generation 4E-FE ===
The first generation of the 4E-FE was produced from 1989 until 1996. The engine found in the Starlet GI, Soleil and Corolla models produces 88 bhp (66 kW; 89 PS) at 6,600 rpm and 86 lb⋅ft (117 N⋅m) at 5,200 rpm. It is directly related to the 4E-FTE, sharing many parts including the throttle body and fuel injectors.

Specs

- Bore x stroke 74 mm × 77.4 mm (2.91 in × 3.05 in)
- 9.6:1 compression ratio

=== Second generation 4E-FE ===
The second generation of the 4E-FE was introduced in 1996 producing less peak power: 75 PS (55 kW; 74 hp) at 5,500 rpm, but with a slight increase in peak torque 87 lb⋅ft (118 N⋅m) at 4,400 rpm. The second generation of the 4E-FE is essentially the same engine as the first but the intake and exhaust manifolds were changed along with a slight alteration of the ECU meant to reduce exhaust emissions. It was discontinued in 1997.

Specs

- Bore x stroke 74.3 mm × 77.4 mm (2.93 in × 3.05 in)
- 9.6:1 compression ratio

=== Third generation 4E-FE ===
In 1997 the intake manifold was changed again along with the ECU and the result was 85 PS (63 kW; 84 hp) for the Corolla and 82 PS (60 kW; 81 hp) for the Starlet. It was discontinued in 1999.

=== 4E-FTE ===
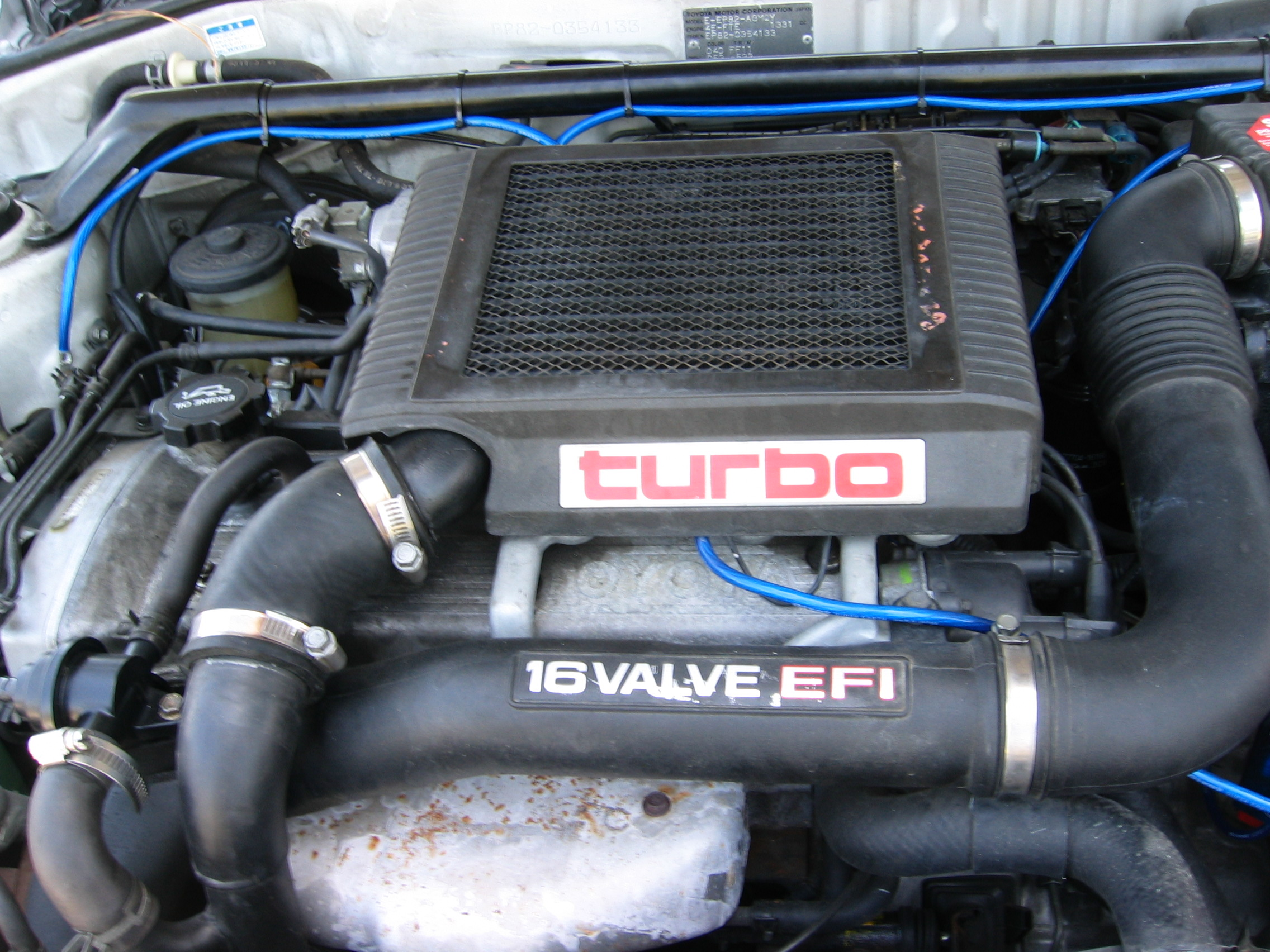
Toyota 4E-FTE engine

The first generation of the 4E-FE became the basis for the 4E-FTE in 1989, which is a turbocharged engine producing 135 PS (99 kW; 133 hp) at 6,400 rpm with 116 lb⋅ft (157 N⋅m) of torque at 4,800 rpm. The 4E-FTE is the most powerful of the E series engines ever produced. It was produced exclusively for the Toyota Starlet GT Turbo and its successor, the Toyota Glanza V, however it also was a very popular conversion engine by enthusiasts for many small Toyota cars such as the Corolla, Tercel, Paseo and Sera which it fit into with standard Toyota parts. It shares the same throttle body and slightly larger fuel injectors with the first generation 4E-FE. The 4E-FTE differs internally from the 4E-FE with its stronger connecting rods, lower compression pistons (reduced from 9.6:1 to 8.5:1) and stronger crankshaft. The cylinder head is identical with the valve train featuring higher lift on the inlet camshaft, and stronger valve springs to the 4E-FE. The 4E-FTE also features a harmonic damper instead of a normal crankshaft pulley. The turbocharger fitted to the 4E-FTE was Toyota's own CT9 model, which features an internal waste gate and has two modes: low 0.4 bar (5.8 psi) and high 0.65 bar (9.4 psi) boost. The low boost mode is electronically controlled by a solenoid valve and the ECU and the high boost is controlled by an actuator connected to the turbocharger. The 4E-FTE also has a top-mounted, air-cooled intercooler. The 4E-FTE is mated to the Toyota C52 transmission (for the EP82 Starlet GT) and the C56 transmission (for the EP91 Glanza V).

Specs

- Bore x stroke 74 mm × 77.4 mm (2.91 in × 3.05 in)
- 8.5:1 compression ratio

== 5E ==
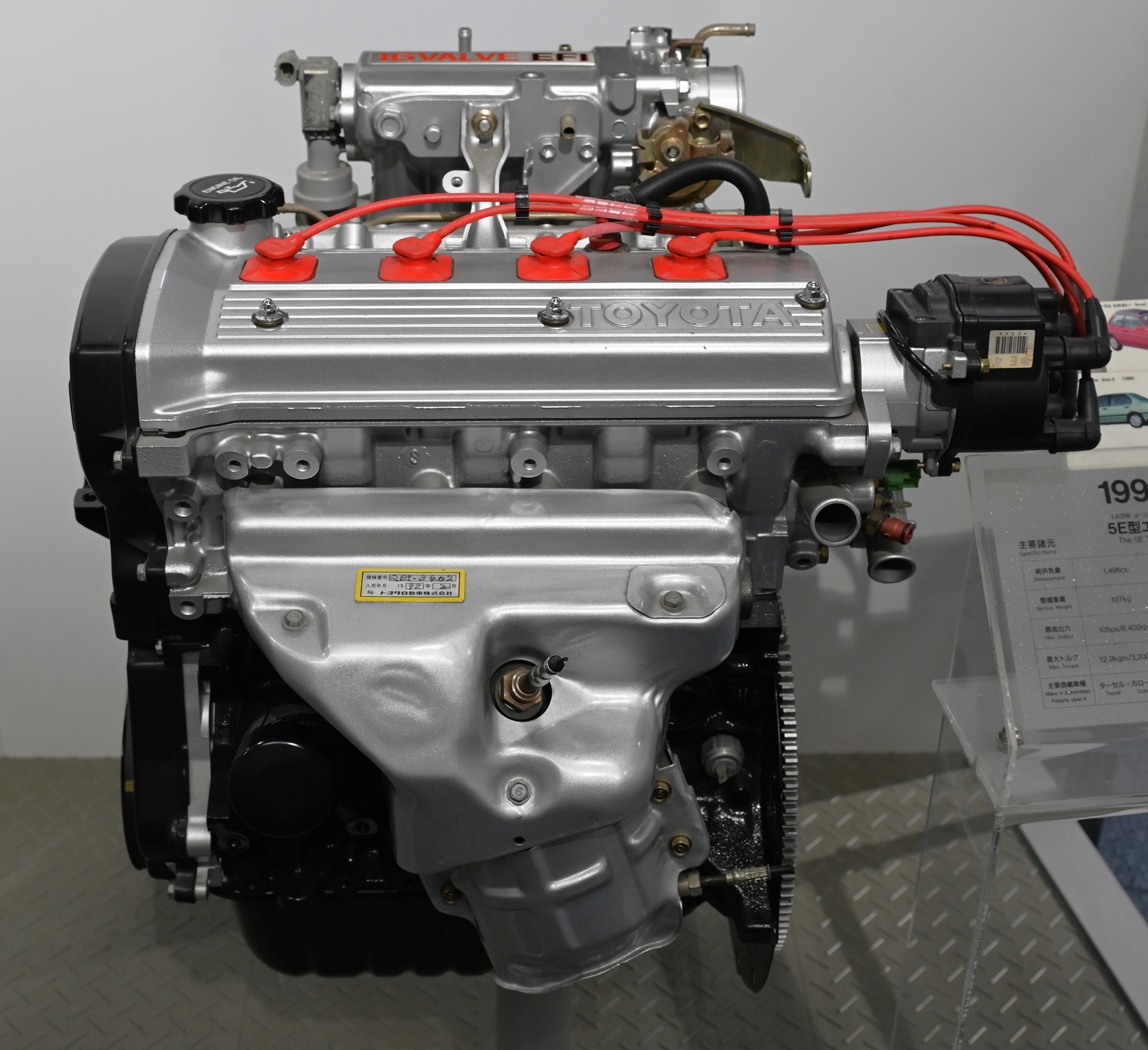
Toyota 5E-FE engine

The 5E is a 1.5 L (1,497 cc) DOHC version with four valves per cylinder. Output ranges from 94 PS (69 kW; 93 hp) at 5,400 rpm to 110 PS (81 kW; 108 hp) at 6,400 rpm with 91 lb⋅ft (123 N⋅m) of torque at 3,200 rpm to 100 lb⋅ft (136 N⋅m) of torque at 4,000 rpm. It was introduced in 1990 and discontinued in 1998. All 5E engines are fuel-injected. It uses a cast crankshaft which interestingly enough has 3E markings (instead of the intended 5E ones). In 1995 Toyota changed the ignition system to a distributor-less (DIS), coil-on-plug design, switched from OBD-I to OBD-II and began using flat-topped pistons. This ignition design uses two coils. Each coil mounts on top of a spark plug, but also has a cable run to another cylinder's spark plug. This is known as a "wasted spark design". It is electrically similar to engines that have a coil pack. The spark plug fires in both directions (center-to-side, and side-to-center). Double platinum plugs are used with this engine to prevent premature side electrode wear. A much thinner 0.26 mm (0.01 in) head gasket is used to increase compression after the piston domes were removed, and dual electrode spark plugs were installed on California emission models. In 1996 the connecting rods changed to the same thinner ones similar to those used in the second generation 4E-FE. In 1997 a return-less fuel system was added.

Specs

- Bore x stroke 74 mm × 87 mm (2.91 in × 3.43 in)
- 9.4:1 compression ratio

Applications

- Toyota Paseo
- Toyota Sera
- Toyota Tercel
- Toyota Raum
- Toyota Caldina
- Toyota Coaster (Series Hybrid)
- Toyota Corolla
- Toyota Corolla II
- Toyota Corsa
- Toyota Cynos
- Toyota Vios

=== 5E-FHE ===
The 5E-FHE uses the harmonic damper from the 4E-FTE and has slightly more aggressive higher lift cams (approximately 8.2mm inlet side, and 7.7mm exhaust side), high compression pistons (although they have a lower dome than 4E-FE pistons), cast 4-2-1 exhaust headers, and stronger internals (including the thicker connecting rods as found in the first generation 5E-FE which are factory forged, and a stronger factory forged crankshaft which has 5E markings instead of 3E markings). Maximum power for the 5E-FHE was increased to 110 PS (81 kW; 108 hp), while maximum engine speed was increased to 7,200 rpm in the first generation and 7,900 rpm for the second generation.

Some versions of the 5E-FHE (but not for the Sera) are fitted with an ACIS intake manifold which is claimed to increase power to 130 PS (96 kW; 128 hp).

== See also ==
- List of Toyota engines
