= Serra (given name) =

Serra is a Turkish feminine given name. People with the name include:

== People ==
- Serra Çağan (born 1997), Turkish footballer
- Serra Kaleli, Turkish diplomat
- Serra Pirinç (born 1997), Turkish actress
- Serra Uzun (born 2002), Turkish wheelchair basketball player
- Serra Yılmaz (born 1954), Turkish actress

== Fictional characters ==
- Serra Paylin, a character in the porn film Who's Nailin' Paylin?
- Col Serra, main character in Star Wars Battlefront: Renegade Squadron

== See also ==
- Serra (disambiguation)
