= Northern Command attacks (Ethiopia) =

Beginning of the Tigray War

- Part of the Tigray War
Date	3–4 November 2020 (Note: Some reports stated that the war began on 4 November; however, the earliest instances of fighting are recorded as taking place during the very late hours of 3 November, EAT (UTC+03:00).)
Location	Northern Command HQ in Mekelle, Tigray Region, Ethiopia
Result	Inconclusive: Beginning of the Tigray War; Ethiopian federal government mobilizes troops against the TPLF

Belligerents
Ethiopia Eritrea (claimed by TPLF)	Tigray People's Liberation Front

Commanders and leaders
(Ethiopia) Abiy Ahmed	Debretsion Gebremichael

Casualties and losses
32 killed, 9 wounded (claimed by ENDF sergeant) "Hundreds" killed (claimed by Abiy Ahmed) Thousands captured	100 killed (claimed by ENDF sergeant)

On 3–4 November 2020, forces loyal to the Tigray People's Liberation Front (TPLF) launched attacks on the Ethiopian National Defense Force (ENDF) Northern Command headquarters in Mekelle and bases in Adigrat, Agula, Dansha, and Sero in the Tigray Region, marking the beginning of the Tigray War. The Ethiopian federal government stated that these attacks justified the ENDF's military action against the TPLF, which, at the time the attacks occurred, held control over the Tigray Region. The TPLF described the action as "a pre-emptive strike."

== Background ==
The attacks took place in the context of major political changes in Ethiopia during 2018–2020, in which the Tigray People's Liberation Front (TPLF) lost control of federal Ethiopian institutions, while retaining power in the Tigray Region and resisting federal control. On 29 October 2020, the TPLF rejected the federal government's appointment of new leadership for the ENDF's Northern Command. On 2 November 2020, Debretsion Gebremichael, head of the TPLF and Tigray Region, stated in a press conference that the ENDF planned to attack the Tigray Region.

=== 3 November dinner party mass arrest ===
Mohammed Tessema of the ENDF stated in early December 2020 that 1000 senior commanders had been taken prisoner by TPLF forces on the evening of 3 November (or 4 November, according to Daily Nation) after being "invited to a dinner party" by the TPLF. In its 9 December 2020 statement, the ENDF said that it had freed the 1000 commanders, who had been held at Adet.

On 13 December, the ENDF issued arrest warrants for Major General Tsadkan Gebretensae, Colonel Berhe WoldeMichael and Commissioner Yehdego Seyoum, stating that Berhe and Yehdego were responsible for the dinner-party detention of the senior commanders.

== Attacks on bases ==
=== Adigrat ===
BBC News interviewed an ENDF sergeant, Bulcha, about the attack on an ENDF base near Adigrat. The base was surrounded by hundreds of TPLF special forces and militias, including Tigrayan soldiers from the camp who had defected to the TPLF, after 23:30 EAT 3 November. Bulcha together with other soldiers requested a colonel to unlock a storeroom with the soldiers' weapons. The colonel refused. Bulcha suspected that the colonel, an ethnic Tigrayan, refused on behalf of the TPLF. The soldiers eventually obtained their weapons, by which time TPLF forces had started shooting.

A shooting battle started at 01:00 EAT 4 November, at a distance of 50 metres between the two sides. Bulcha claimed that there were 32 ENDF fatalities and 100 TPLF fatalities. The battle ended when ENDF commanders ordered their soldiers to return their weapons to the storeroom. Priests and town elders negotiated a surrender, which took place at 16:00, with the ENDF soldiers rendering their arms to the TPLF.

The ENDF soldiers were taken to a TPLF base at Abiy Addi, 150 kilometres to the south-west, where they were held for two weeks and provided with tea, bread and not much water. Bulcha and his colleagues' personal valuables were confiscated. After negotiating the burning of their uniforms to avoid them being re-used by the TPLF, the ENDF soldiers were transported in trucks, each carrying 500 soldiers, to the border between Tigray Region and Amhara Region at the Tekezé River, which they crossed by boat. The soldiers walked 16 hours to Soqota where they were lodged at a police compound and the wounded hospitalised.

An ENDF soldier at a different ENDF base near Adigrat, also interviewed by BBC News, was on guard duty from 22:00 to 24:00 EAT 3 November. He heard gunshots after finishing his guard duty. TPLF special forces and militias entered the camp, ordering the ENDF soldiers to surrender. The ENDF soldiers surrendered after being ordered to by their senior officers, Tigrayans. The ENDF soldiers were transported to Idaga Hamus on 6 November, kept there for a week, and taken to Abiy Addi, where they were kept for three weeks in small rooms with "very crammed conditions". The witness was allowed to leave and transported with others to the Amhara Region border at Tekezé River on trucks, after which they crossed the river and go to Soqota. He described the truck journey as "very difficult", during which some of the soldiers fell off the trucks and broke their legs.

The BBC News witnesses stated that senior commanders, radio operators, women soldiers and soldiers with heavy weapons skills were not allowed to leave the Abiy Addi detention site.

=== Agula ===
The ENDF base at Agula was surrounded and called for rescue at 23:30 EAT 3 November.

=== Dansha ===
Just before midnight on the evening of 3 November, ENDF member Hussen Besheir at an ENDF camp for the Northern Command Fifth Battalion near Dansha was on guard when ten Tigrayan special forces personnel requested to meet the camp's commander. Hussen refused, an argument started, and guns were fired.

Rifle and grenade battles in the Dansha attack lasted for most of the night. The attackers included former ENDF forces who had defected to the TPLF.

Agence France-Presse (AFP) journalists visiting Dansha after the event described the military barracks as "bullet-scarred", a few shops boarded up, and most of the town as "unscathed".

=== Mekelle ===
The Northern Command headquarters in the Tigrayan capital city Mekelle was attacked on 4 November. Most of the staff there were administrative and the headquarters were easily captured.

In the early hours of the morning, gunfire was reported around the Mekelle airport, after federal government commandos reportedly arrived with the apparent goal of securing military assets and, possibly removing and apprehending the TPLF leadership.

=== Sero ===
ENDF soldiers Takele Ambaye and Molla Kassa stated that the Sero base near the Eritrean border was attacked at 05:00 EAT on 4 November. According to the two soldiers' report, the ENDF forces shot at the attackers, initially succeeding in defending their base. The base was sieged by TPLF forces. ENDF soldiers rationed their food supplies, which lasted for eight days. On the tenth day of the siege, a six-hour battle took place, with the TPLF using tanks, anti-aircraft guns and mortars. The ENDF soldiers surrendered.

== Extrajudicial executions ==
In a statement made late in December 2020, Ethiopian prime minister Abiy Ahmed stated that extrajudicial executions had occurred during the attacks. He stated that the "TPLF identified and separated hundreds of unarmed Ethiopian soldiers of non-Tigrayan origin, tied their hands and feet together, massacred them in cold blood, and left their bodies lying in open air." Abiy suggested that the TPLF forces had "record[ed] themselves singing and dancing on the bodies of their victims."

== TPLF statements ==
Early on, the TPLF gave conflicting statements about the nature of the attacks. The TPLF described the November attacks as a pre-emptive strike since it expected to be attacked by the ENDF. They alleged that, in the months and days before the fighting erupted, Ethiopian armed forces had been mobilized towards Tigray, apparently also being deployed into nearby Eritrea in cooperation with that country's leadership. Some researchers at the Canadian Global Affairs Institute have stated that this claim "is not supported by interview data on the deployment patterns of the federal troops". Head of the Tigrayan government, Debretsion Gebremichael, stated to Reuters, "We didn't initiate any attack." He said that some soldiers "joined us by rejecting [the] federal treatment to Tigray." Wondimu Asamew of the TPLF stated, "There was no attack" and that the story of the attacks was a fictional pretext for attacking TPLF forces.

Sekoutoure Getachew (also Sekuture) of the TPLF described the attacks as "pre-emptive", an "internationally known practice" and an "imperative".

In an interview with Dimtsi Weyane broadcast on 29 May 2021, General Tsadkan Gebretensae, member of the TPLF central committee and former head of the military during the TPLF led government, confirmed the attack, stating "the only option of the Government of Tigray was to use its smaller force to take control over the North Command which was large in numbers and capacity in just a very short period of time". He rejected the claim that the TPLF was the first to initiate military preparations and threats, stating, "[This] war was started by our enemies who have been preparing for a long time. … Now they are attempting to present it as a retaliation for the 'attack' on the North Command; this is just a fairy tale."

In March 2022, TPLF spokesman Getachew Reda stated that the war had started when the TPLF "undertook a preemptive operation to disarm and neutralize the Northern Command."

== Reactions ==
United States Secretary of State Mike Pompeo and Assistant Secretary for African Affairs Tibor Nagy expressed "grave concern" about the attacks "by the Tigray People's Liberation Front, TPLF, on Ethiopian National Defense Force bases in the Tigray region".
