= Serro (disambiguation) =

Serro is a Brazilian municipality located in the state of Minas Gerais.

Serro may also refer to:

- Serro (musician), Kenyan singer, songwriter and performer of benga, afro-pop and jazz style
- Serro Ventoso, a civil parish in the municipality of Porto de Mós, Portugal

== See also ==
- Sero (disambiguation)
- Serra (disambiguation)
