= Serum =

Serum may refer to:

== Biology and pharmacology ==
- Serum (blood), plasma from which the clotting proteins have been removed
  - Antiserum, blood serum with specific antibodies for passive immunity
- Serous fluid, any clear bodily fluid

== Places ==
- Serum, India

== Other uses ==
- Gary Serum (born 1956), American baseball player
- Serum, a software synthesizer VST created by Steve Duda

== See also ==
- Sera (disambiguation)
