= Toyota Sera =

Toyota Sera (EXY10)
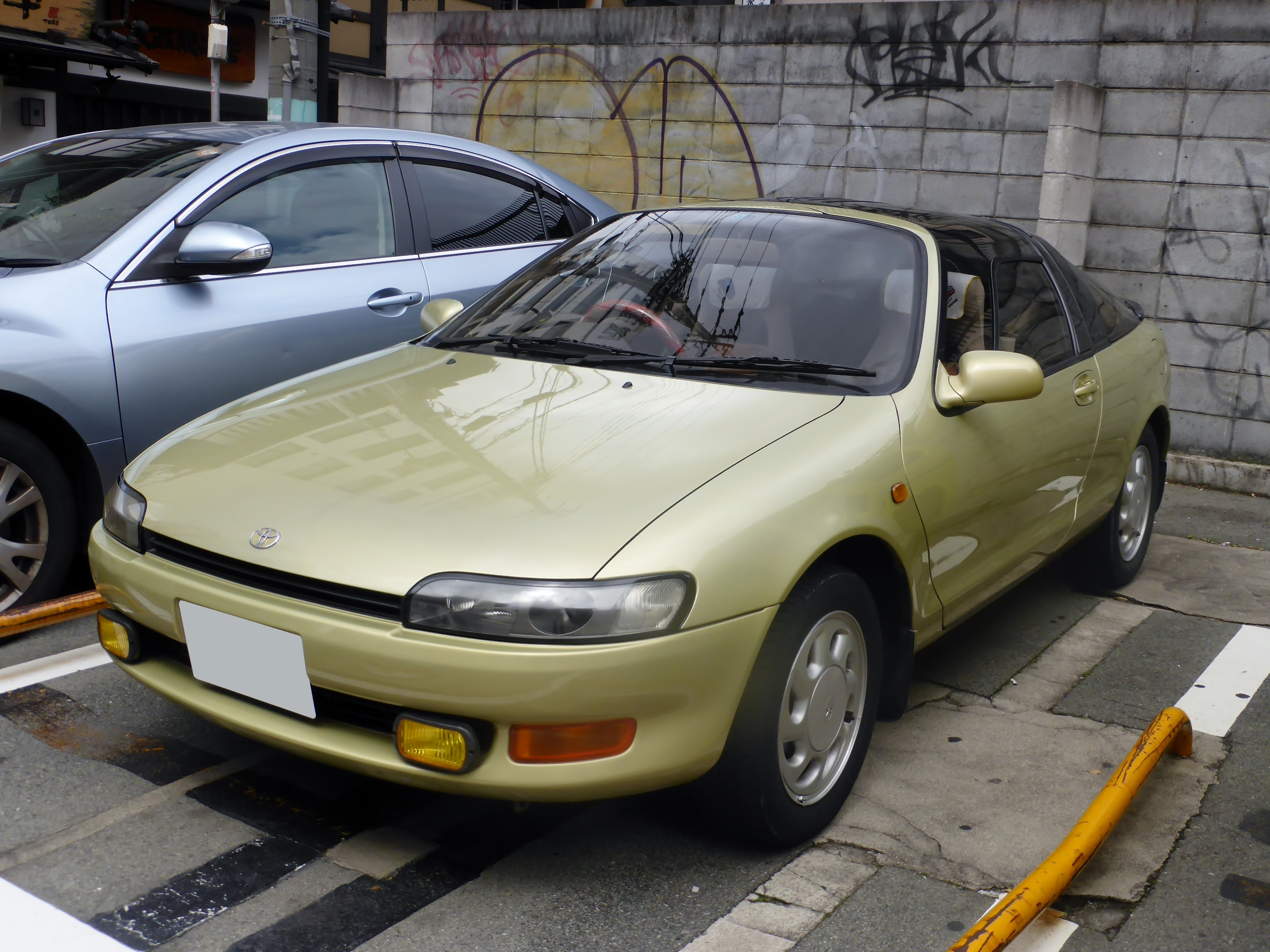

Overview
- Manufacturer: Toyota
- Production: February 1990 – December 1995
- Assembly: Japan: Sagamihara, Kanagawa (Central Motors)
- Designer: Stewart Reed

Body and chassis
- Class: Subcompact car
- Body style: 3-door liftback coupe
- Layout: Front-engine, front-wheel-drive
- Doors: Butterfly
- Related: Toyota Tercel; Toyota Paseo; Toyota Starlet

Powertrain
- Engine: 1.5L 5E-FHE I4
- Transmission: 4-speed automatic; 5-speed manual

Dimensions
- Wheelbase: 2,300 mm (90.6 in)
- Length: 3,860 mm (152.0 in)
- Width: 1,650 mm (65.0 in)
- Height: 1,265 mm (49.8 in)
- Curb weight: 930 kg (2,050 lb)

Chronology
- Predecessor: Toyota AXV-II Concept

The Toyota Sera (model designation EXY10) is a 3-door 2+2 liftback coupe manufactured and marketed by Toyota from 1990 to 1995. It was only officially sold in Japan.

The Sera debuted in 1988 as the Toyota AXV-II concept car in a near production-ready form, and is noted for its mostly glass roof canopy and its butterfly doors, which tilt up and forward when open. A year later, the production-version Sera was presented at the 1989 Tokyo Motor Show. A vertically positioned and electrically automated model was also shown to demonstrate the butterfly doors and rear hatch in action.

"Sera" is derived from the future tense of the French verb "être," which means "to be."

== Overview ==
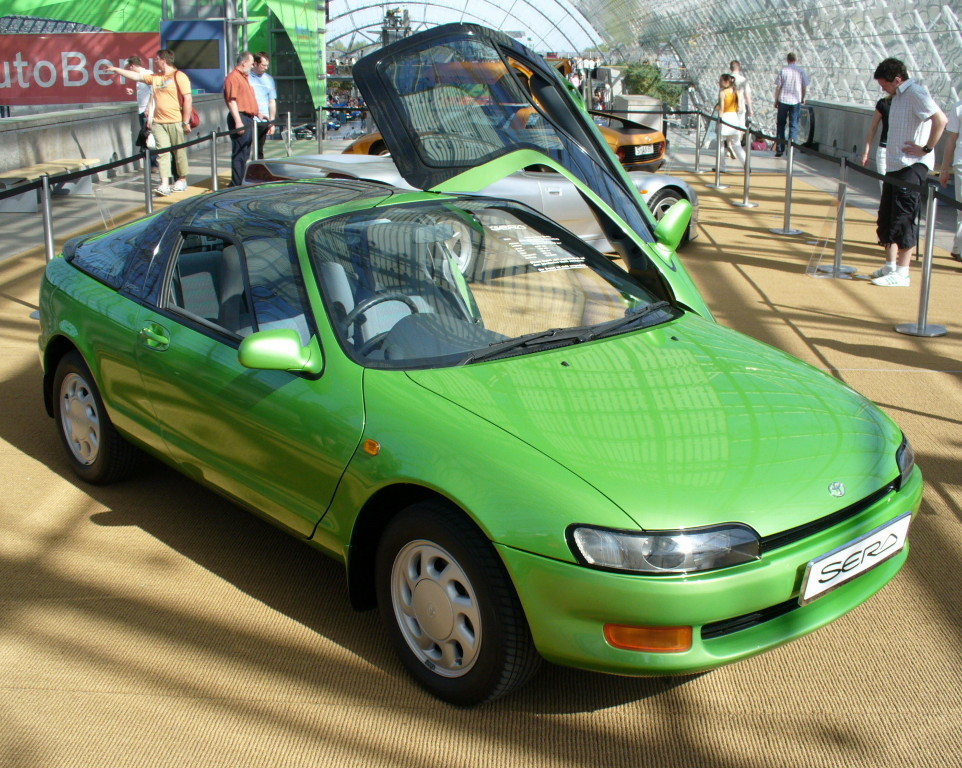
Toyota Sera with one of the butterfly doors open

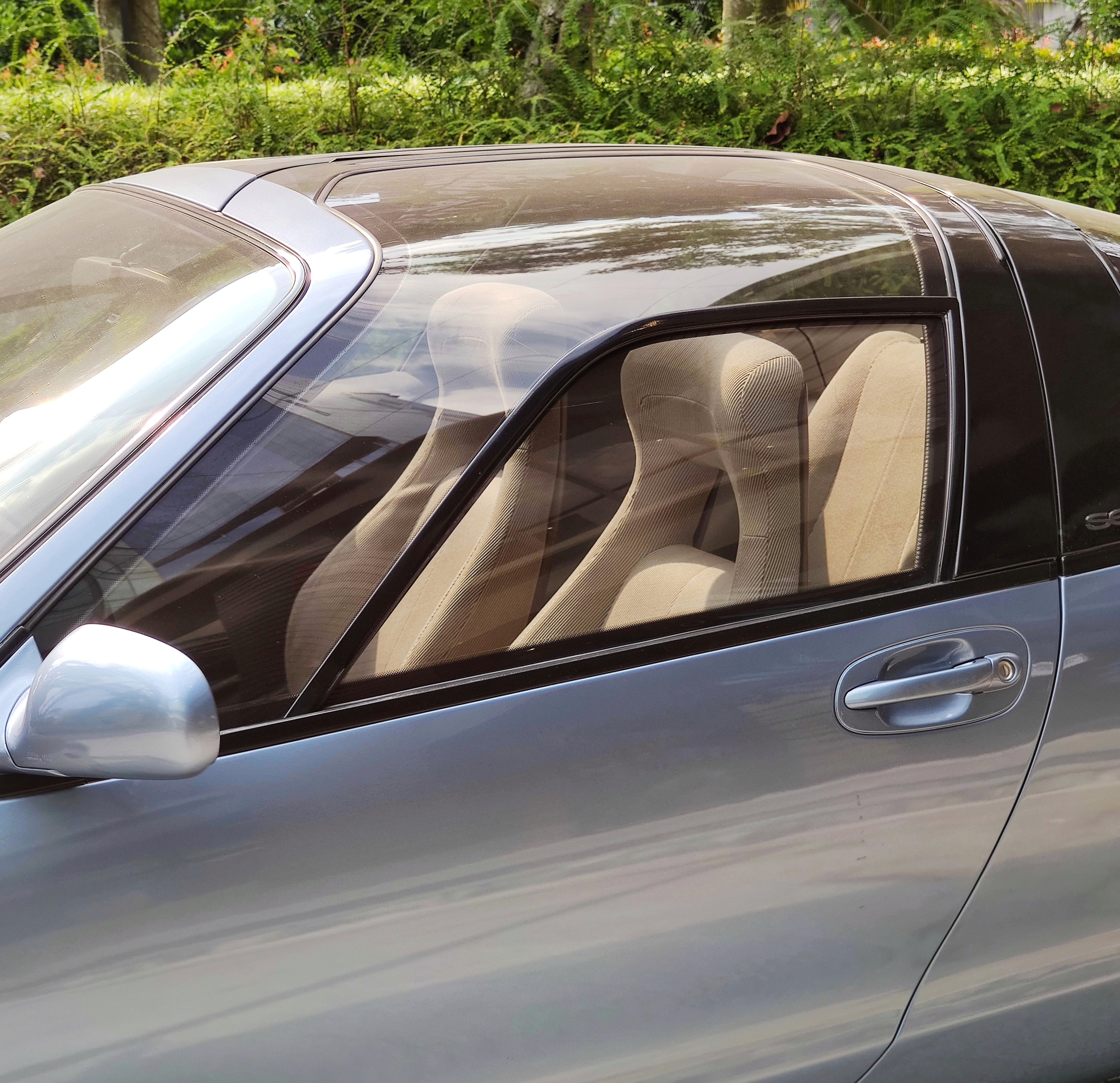
The distinctive glass roof "bubble" canopy provides a clear and wide opening view.

Released in a single engine configuration and body style, the Sera featured optional configurations for its transmission, brakes, cold climate and sound-system. Toyota marketed three trim versions, marketed as Phases, over its production and marketed the Sera exclusively in Japanese Toyota retail sales channels Toyota Auto Store — as an alternative to the Toyota MR2, which was exclusive to Toyota Vista Store.

A total of 15,941 were built between February 1990 and December 1995. 15,852 units were registered in Japan. Approx. 30 pre-production cars were used for development purposes.

== Mechanical ==
The Sera came with the 1.5 L (1496 cc) inline 4 5E-FHE unleaded petrol engine, the largest capacity version of Toyota's E series of engines included in the Paseo and the Starlet. It produced 78 kW (104 hp) and 132 N⋅m (97 lb⋅ft) of torque. This was installed in a front-mount, front wheel drive transverse configuration with electronic fuel injection. All versions came with power assisted rack and pinion steering and either the Toyota A242L 4-speed automatic or the Toyota C155 5-speed manual transmission. The brakes were vented discs at the front and drums at the rear, unless fitted with the optional Anti-Lock Braking system which had vented discs all round.

Mechanically the car is related to both the Paseo and the Starlet, sharing similar floorpans, suspension, steering and brakes.

== Design ==
=== Body ===
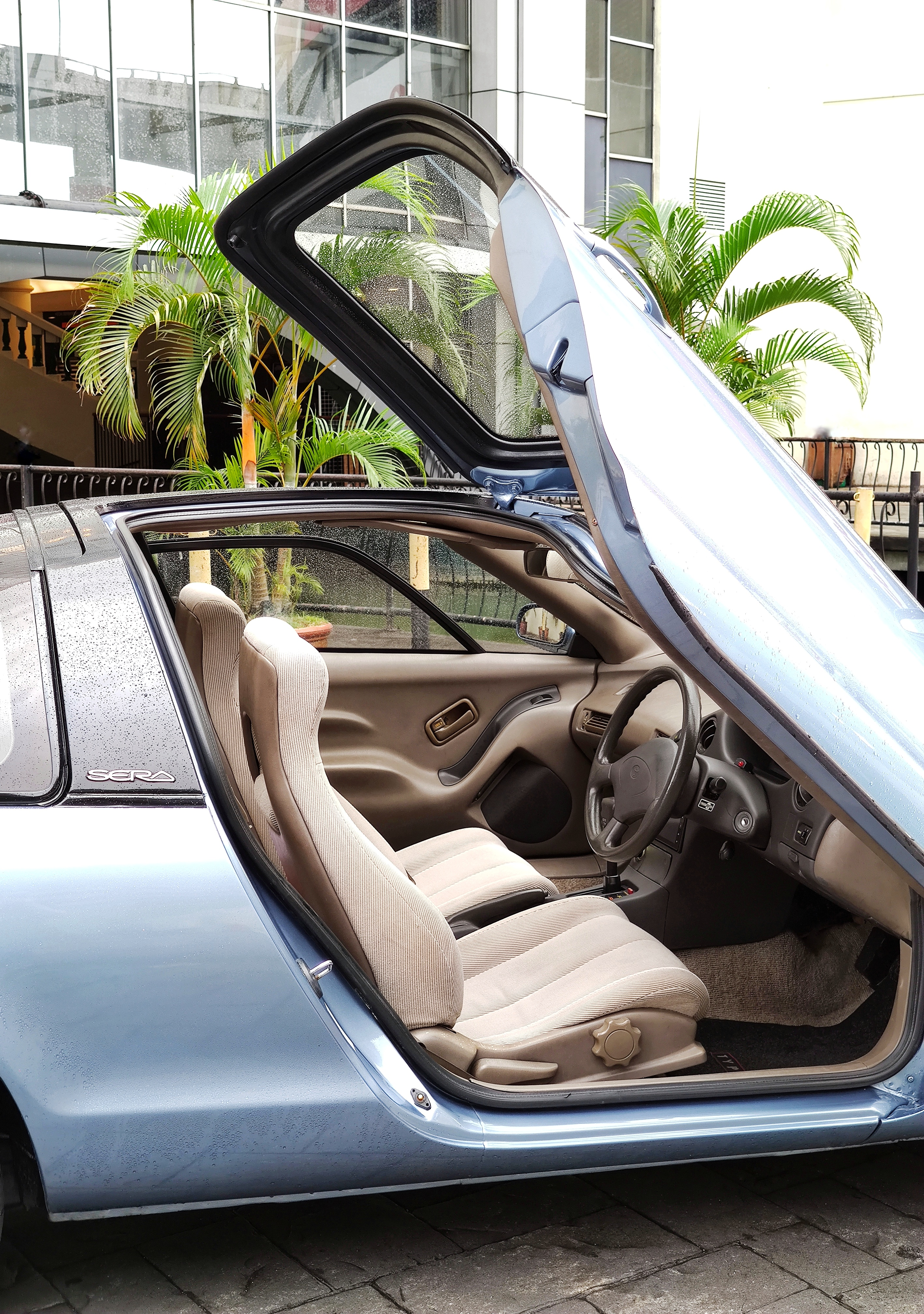
A closer side view on the butterfly door

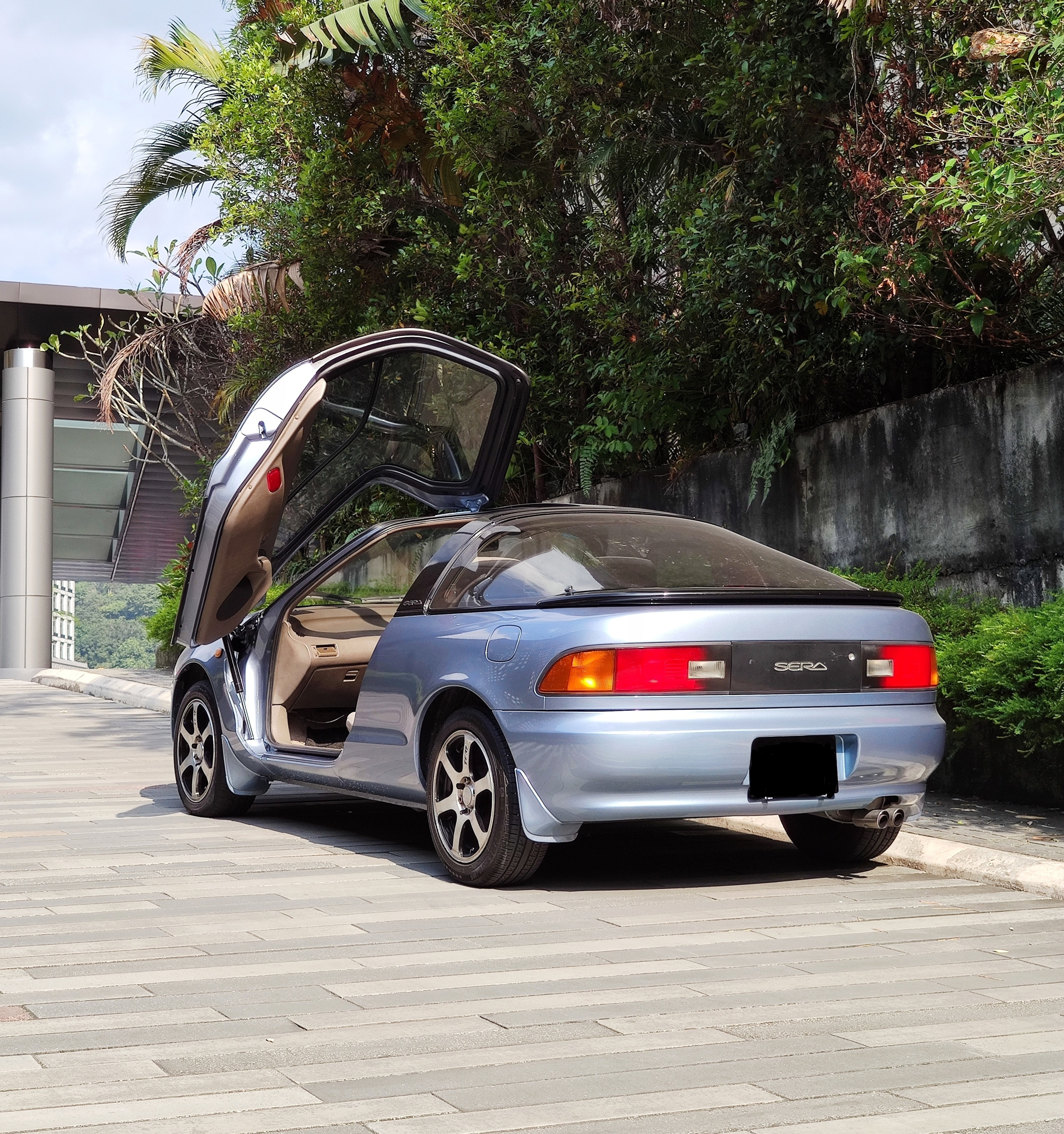
Rear view with one butterfly door opened up

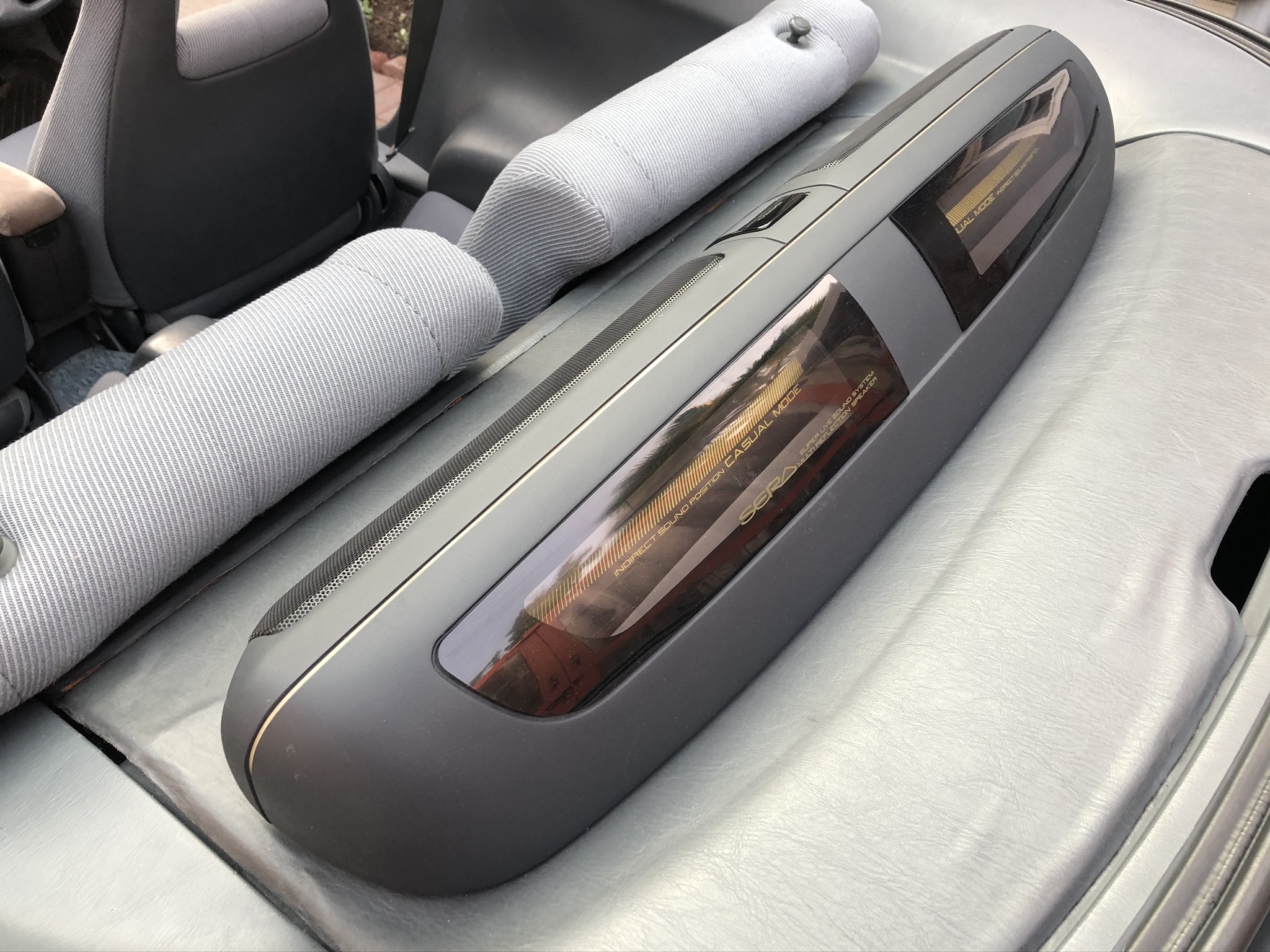
Sera with the optional Super-Live Sound System in "Casual Mode"

The Toyota Sera is a 3-door hatchback coupe of monocoque steel construction. The Sera's butterfly doors are hinged at the top centre of the windscreen, and bottom of the A pillar and open forward and up in a manner similar to the McLaren F1 and Saleen S7 - the McLaren F1 designer Gordon Murray cited the Sera as the inspiration of the F1's door arrangement.

Stewart Reed first presented the concept to Eiji Toyota in the early 1980s, having developed the model at Toyota's Calty Design Studio in Newport Beach. The Japanese design team carried it to another concept model with softer exterior curves, and ultimately a production model which was exhibited it at the Tokyo Motor Show.

The weight of each door is primarily supported by a thick gas strut and counterbalanced by a smaller secondary strut inside the door. Unlike conventional hinged side-opening doors, the butterfly doors can be opened fully in a fairly confined space, requiring only 43 cm (17 in) of lateral clearance. The Sera features windows that curve upward into the 'glass roof' section of the vehicle.

The rear hatch is constructed of a single piece of glass without a supporting steel frame. This, in combination with a steeply sloping front windscreen and glass upper-door/roof panels (a total of six separate glass pieces overall), give the Sera its distinctive canopy and provides expansive visibility, although the B-pillar is far more noticeable in the all glass canopy. To deal with its high solar load, air-conditioning and twin removable interior roof panels are standard.

=== Interior ===
Front bucket seats feature three point seatbelts and can tilt and slide forward to give access to the rear. The rear bench seat features a fixed central arm rest and either two or three point seatbelts.

In its normal interior configuration (with the back seats up and the parcel shelf in place) the rear cargo area does have a noticeably small opening (52 cm by 82 cm) and an elevated lip necessitating the lifting of luggage quite high before it can be placed inside. However the boot is relatively deep and spacious. In addition the rear seats fold down and both the parcel shelf and the rear divider panel (usually in place behind the back seats) can be completely removed, in essence turning the entire rear half of the car into a cargo area. As such the Toyota Sera has a large amount of available storage space for its size. The space-saving spare tire and changing kit are contained in a small compartment below the boot floor.

== Phases ==
Toyota produced the Sera in three distinct trim variants, with either manual or automatic transmission, standard or ABS brakes and regular stereo or Super-Live Sound System ("SLSS") forming the three major choices for buyers. There were also a large number of additional factory options available across the entire production run.

=== Phase I (March 1990 – May 1991) ===
The initial build and the majority of the Sera's total production (around 12,000 of the 15,852 or so cars produced) featured:

- 6 exterior colours (greenish yellow, medium blue, light turquoise (blue), wine red, dark grey and silver)
- beige/tan interior or greyish blue depending on exterior colour
- bayonet fuel filler cap
- hard-wearing ribbed and woven seat material

=== Phase II (May 1991 – June 1992) ===
Around 2,300 cars of this second trim were produced featuring:

- pastel pattern in the main sections of the seats with tan/greyish bolsters depending on interior colour
- screw-type fuel filler cap
- different seat materials

=== Phase III (June 1992 – December 1995) ===
1,550 of the final version of the Sera were manufactured, featuring:

- grey interior with seat fabrics that have a secondary colour to complement the exterior colour
- some engine component revisions
- side impact beams in the doors
- optional airbags (which may have been automatically accompanied by ABS)
- three-point rear seat belts (Some very early Phase 3 models had standard lap belts)
- stronger door struts to compensate for the side impact beams
- solid plastic spoiler with LED high-level brake light incorporated (the only external change to the Sera)
