= Strengthening Emergency Response Abilities Project =

USAID–Ethiopia disaster-preparedness pilot, 1997–2001

Strengthening Emergency Response Abilities (SERA) Project was a four-year disaster-risk-reduction programme carried out in Ethiopia between 1997 and 2001. It was managed by the federal Disaster Prevention and Preparedness Commission (DPPC, now the National Disaster Risk Management Commission) and funded by the United States Agency for International Development (USAID).

== Background ==
Following Ethiopia’s 1995 constitution and the move toward ethnic federalism, the DPPC sought to shift national disaster policy from reactive relief to proactive risk reduction. In June 1997 a federal workshop on food security proposed developing local-level vulnerability profiles; USAID subsequently committed US$3.7 million for a pilot initiative later named SERA.

== Implementation ==
The project began field operations in mid-1999, first in four woredas of the Amhara Region (Tach Gayint, Ebinat, Sekota and Ziquala). Activities included:

- compiling district-level vulnerability profiles for 35 chronically food-insecure woredas;
- delivering risk-assessment training to regional officials and DPPC staff;
- setting up data-sharing protocols between regional early-warning units.

Field teams used rapid rural appraisal, focus-group interviews and household surveys; the Central Statistical Agency assisted with sampling and data entry.

== Findings ==
USAID’s 2001 evaluation identified five structural drivers of chronic vulnerability: population pressure on land, limited natural resources, entrenched poverty, inadequate basic services and weak household coping capacity. The evaluation noted that SERA’s profiles were the first attempt to synthesise socio-economic, agro-ecological and nutrition data at woreda scale, providing local officials with a baseline for early-warning and development planning.

== Assessment and follow-on ==
A mid-term review judged the methodology informative but labour-intensive, recommending a streamlined set of indicators for future updates. Elements of the SERA approach were incorporated into the Emergency Preparedness Strengthening Program (EPSP) launched in 2003, which helped establish Ethiopia’s multi-hazard early-warning system.

== Legacy ==
SERA’s profiling template informed Ethiopia’s 2006 Disaster Risk Management policy framework and was later cited in regional disaster-risk-reduction inventories. The project’s emphasis on local participation has been referenced in African Union guidance on community-based DRR legislation.

== See also ==
- United States Agency for International Development
