= Serra Grande =

Serra Grande, Portuguese for "large mountain chain", may refer to:

- Serra Grande, Paraíba, a municipality in the state of Paraíba, Brazil
- Serra Grande, Valença, a district in the municipality of Valença, Bahia, Brazil
- Serra Grande Gold Mine
- Serra da Ibiapaba, an upland in northeastern Brazil, also known as Serra Grande
