= Sera (company) =

Aquarium product manufacturer

sera
- Type: Limited Liability Company/Family Owned
- Industry: Fishkeeping
- Founded: Germany (1970)
- Headquarters: Heinsberg, Germany
- Key people: Josef Ravnak, General manager, Anny Ravnak, Commercial management
- Products: Vipan; Aqutan; Costapur
- Number of employees: 200 (2023)
- Website: www.sera.de

Sera (stylized as sera) is a German company that produces and sells home aquaculture, aquarium products and food for pet fish. The company is based in Heinsberg (North Rhine-Westphalia), Germany.

== History ==
Sera was founded in 1970 by fish food salesman Josef Ravnak. The name came from the combination of Ravnak's first name Sepp (nickname for Josef), and his family name.

Shortly after its founding, the company began to specialize in lyophilization, a freeze-dry process that preserves food animals with the intended retention of their nutrients and vitamins.

In 1972, Sera Vipan flakes became the flagship product of the company, aiming towards broader aquarium hobby customers. In the 1970s, Sera expanded its product range to include water conditioners such as Sera Aqutan and Sera Morena, aquatic plant fertilizers like Sera Florena, and aquarium fish medications including Sera Costapur and Sera Baktopur. The company also developed water testing kits during this period.

By the late 1970s, Sera introduced garden pond care products as well as products for turtles and other reptiles.

During the 1980s, Sera added new lines of foods, vitamins, and technological products, among which the Sera Bio-Denitrator, a device designed to biologically reduce nitrate levels in aquariums.

Sera products are sold in more than 80 countries.

== Products ==
Sera's Nature brand of fish and reptile food products include insect meal-based products (Sera Insect and Pond Insect), natural colored staple foods (Vipan and Vipagran), Spirulina-enriched tablets (Spirulina Tabs and Plankton Tabs), green-matter rich algae crisps (Catfish chips), and treat mixes with freeze-dried organisms (GVG Mix).

== See also ==
- Fish food
