= Serra High School =

Serra High School may refer to:

- Junípero Serra High School (Gardena, California), United States
- Junípero Serra High School (San Mateo, California), United States
- Serra Catholic High School, in McKeesport, Pennsylvania, United States
- Serra Catholic School, in Rancho Santa Margarita, California, United States
- Canyon Hills High School (San Diego), formerly Junipero Serra High School, United States
- JSerra Catholic High School, in San Juan Capistrano, California, United States
