= Sero, Ethiopia =

- village
- Interactive map of Sero, Ethiopia
- Coordinates: 14.3214°N 39.2255°E
- Country: Ethiopia
- State: Tigray
- Zone: Misraqawi

Sero or Siero (Tigrinya: ሴሮ) is a village in Misraqawi Zone in Ethiopia near the Eritrean border.

== Regional transport ==
Sero is located on Ethiopian Highway 15 in between Adigrat and Adwa.

== History ==
The Ethiopian National Defense Force (ENDF) military base at Sero was one of the bases attacked during the 4 November Northern Command attacks that were considered by the federal Ethiopian government as the trigger for the 2020 Tigray conflict.
